= Art in Sheffield =

Sheffield, England, has a large population of amateur, working and professional visual artists and artworks.

== Notable artists ==
Artists linked with Sheffield from the 19th to 21st century include:

- John Ruskin (1819–1900) polymath, Victorian art critic, educator, social thinker and according to art critic Kenneth Clark the best 'watercolourist' of the second half of the 19th century. In 1871, Ruskin founded the charity the Guild of St George (charity reg no 231758), and with his own money purchased and established what became known as the St Georges Museum. The Museum opened in Walkley, a suburb of Sheffield, in 1875, housing the Guild's collection until 1890 when it was moved to Meersbrook Hall in Sheffield. In 2000, the Guild collection was sited at what is now known as the Ruskin Gallery at the Millennium Galleries, Surrey Street, Sheffield.
- J. M. W. Turner (1775–1851), JMWT painted in 1797 the watercolour 'View of Sheffield from Derbyshire Lane', which is commemorated by a plinth in the centre of Meersbrook Park about a 100 metres from Meersbrook Hall (now the registered office of the Guild of St George.)
- Henry Swann (1825–1889), an engraver and first curator of St Georges Museum in Walkley.
- Benjamin Creswick (1853–1946), knife maker and sculptor
- John Wharlton Bunney (1828–1882) who between 1878 and 1882 painted 'Façade of San Marco, Venice', now situated at the Ruskin Gallery at Millennium Galleries.
- Genevieve Pilley (1887–1958) calligrapher and illuminator, devoted 50 years to John Ruskin at Meersbrook Museum, including as acting curator 1931–1946 of the Guild of St George collection
- Stanley Royle RBA, RCA (1888–1961) lived for most of his life in and around Sheffield and was commissioned to paint four major views of Sheffield
- Phillipa Abrahams, artist, made a 'reconstruction' which is on display at Sheffield's Ruskin Gallery of 'Madonna and Child' painted in 1470 by Andrea del Verrochio, which was sold by the Guild in 1974 to the National Gallery of Scotland
- Edward Stanley Billin (1911–1994) the last President of Sheffield Society of Artists
- George H. Constantine (1878–1969) became Technical Director of the City Art Galleries in Sheffield
- Frank Constantine O.B.E. (1919–2014) son of George Constantine and for 18 years as director of Sheffield City Art restored, rebuilt and extended the city art collection, such that the Arts Council of England entrusted Sheffield with the 'first British Art Show' in 1979)
- Frank Saltfleet (1860–1937) was encouraged by John Ruskin to become a professional artist, he was elected President of the Sheffield Society of Artists in 1894–5, Vice President 1913–1922 and acting President 1923–33, exhibited with his wife Jean Saltfleet at the Cutler's Hall in 191
- Jean Saltfleet (1861–1941), wife of Frank Saltfleet, was the first Principal of the Sheffield College of Art
- Kenneth Steel (1906–1973)
- Margaret Shaw (1917–1983)
- T. W. Ward (1918–2000)
- William Samuel Taylor (1920–2010), taught at Sheffield College of Arts and Crafts which in 1969 became part of Sheffield Polytechnic. He was Dean of the Faculty of Art 1972–75 (the Polytechnic was renamed Hallam University in 1992
- Audrey Wallis (1919–1997) taught at Sheffield College of Art/Sheffield Polytechnic from 1948 to 1980
- Pablo Ruiz Picasso (1881–1973) visited Sheffield in 1950 for the World Peace Congress, leaving behind 3 dove of peace drawings one of which is now in Sheffield Museums collection
- Lucianne Lassalle, sculptor who exhibits at Cupola gallery and is the niece of Sylvette David (now known as Lydia Corbett), Picasso's model for series 'Girl with a pony tail' (1953/4) and sculpture in 1970
- George Fullard A.R.A (1923–1973) an award winner in the Junior Section of the first John Moores Liverpool biennial exhibition in 1957, 'a landmark in British Art' for his sculpture 'Running Woman' now sited in the grounds of Upper Chapel Norfolk Street, Sheffield. 'Walking Man' 1957 has since 2005 been sited at the front entrance of the Winter Gardens in Sheffield city centre)
- Jack Smith (1928–2011), in 1956 with 3 other 'kitchen sink' painters represented Britain at Venice Biennale, was first prize winner of the first John Moores Liverpool exhibition in 1957 for the painting 'Creation and Crucifixion'
- John Hoyland R.A.(1934–2011, born Sheffield), Endre Roeder (1933– was Education Services Curator with Sheffield City Galleries until 1974), Gordon Snee (1931–2013, several retrospective exhibitions held in Sheffield), Paul Schatzberger (1950–2021, gold award Art in the Gardens Sheffield in 2011)
- Rosalind Nashashibi (Sheffield Hallam graduate and Turner prize nominee 2017)
- Peter Doig ('There is no wealth but life/Peter Doig printmaker exhibition' at The Scottish Queen, 21–24 South Street, Park Hill, Sheffield September to October 2015)
- Manish Harijan (won 'Lifelong Learning award' in 2019 at Sheffield Hallam university)
- Leslie Cornthwaite (Judges Prize, i.e. best in exhibition for 'Pots and jugs' at 2014 'Art in the Gardens', held annually at Botanical Gardens, Sheffield)
- Bryn Hughes (winner of Sheffield Prize in 2004 & 2010 at Great Sheffield Art show & prize winner in 2004, 2005, 2011, 2014 and 2016 at Sheffield Arts in the Gardens), Joe Scarborough, Pete McKee, the Designers Republic, Thom Wilson
- Kid Acne, street artist and musician

=== Sculptors ===
- George Fullard A.R.A. (1923–1973)
- Trevor Faulkner (1929– FRSBS lectured at Sheffield Polytechnic, won prizes with Worshipful Company of Pewterers and Goldsmiths Company)
- Coralie Turpin (received a special commendation in 2022, the Keith Hayman Award for Public Art, work includes Vertical Superposition, a 6-metre-tall (20 ft) stainless steel-and-mosaic sculpture consisting of five vertical columns on St Thomas Street, and five entrance floor panels on the corner of Fitzwilliam St and Moore St Sheffield, commissioned by Fusion Students for the new five-block building, housing thousands of students)
- Mario Raggi ('Vulcan' 1897, bronze on top of Town Hall)
- George King, creator of the Covid Memorial sculpture in 2023 at Balms Green Gardens, Sheffield.

'The Man of Steel' if and when completed (initial planning permission was 2012 has now lapsed) will be a stainless steel landmark 38 metres tall overlooking Sheffield as gateway to the North. Its creator is Steve Mehdi who also designed the Heart of Steel presently sited at Meadowhall, raising funds for The British Heart Foundation, but which it was originally intended would eventually be inserted inside the Man of Steel.

=== Fine Arts graduates ===
Sheffield is home to two universities, one of which, Sheffield Hallam University, has a Fine Arts department. Formerly based at Psalter Lane, the department relocated to Sheffield City Centre in 2008.

Fine Arts graduates from Sheffield Hallam University include:

- Rosalind Nashshibi, Turner Prize nominee in 2017
- Jamie Crewe, Turner Prize nominee and one of its bursary winners in 2020
- Conor Rogers, 1st prize winner of Robert Walters Group sponsored UK Young Artist of the Year in 2019
- Lynn Hodnett, winner of British Airways Young Achievers in Art award resulting in a commission for a 8'x5' painting at Heathrow Airport
- Manish Harijan, winner of the Dianne Willcocks Lifelong Learning award on award of master's degree in 2019
- Dr Eleanor Gates-Stuart, Taiwan and Australia professorships in technology and art

== Galleries and studios ==
Amongst galleries, exhibition spaces and studios in Sheffield include,

- The Millennium Galleries (also containing the Ruskin Gallery), constructed in 2001,
- The Graves Art Gallery opened in 1934 (in the top floor of the Art Deco period building that houses Sheffield Central Library)
- The Site Gallery (a digital arts media gallery)
- The Art House, APG Works, Bank Street Works, B&B gallery, KIAC, 99 Mary Street
- S1 Artspace,
- Bloc Projects
- Sheffield Institute of Arts Gallery (part of Sheffield Hallam University).

The Site Gallery, along with studios such as Yorkshire ArtSpace and the participatory arts space Access Space, are located in the Cultural Industries Quarter of Sheffield. This area is also home to the Showroom Cinema, Sheffield, an arthouse cinema which occasionally showcases art.

Weston Park Museum incorporates the Sheffield City Museum and Mappin Art Gallery which first opened in 1887.

Cupola Contemporary Art Gallery (established in 1991) is located in Hillsborough opposite the Leppings Lane tramstop. Described by the Sheffield Metropolitan as the most respected contemporary gallery in the north, as well as sales and exhibitions of fine art and crafts, the gallery represents over 300 artists.

Sheffield Makers shop (as its names suggests 'home grown'), began as a Christmas pop up shop in 2015 and is now situated in a unit at the Winter Garden. Moonko is a shop in S1 supporting 'young budding artists' and local brands; similarly 'All Good Stuff' the gallery shop at Butcher Works sells a range of arts and crafts by local artists and Bird's Yard at 44 Chapel Walk indicated on their website in January 2023 that they opened 7 days a week stocking a collection of works by local artists.

Various initiatives/shows exist throughout the year to showcase the work of local Sheffield, Yorkshire and Derbyshire artists – amateur through to professional. Amongst these are "Open Up Sheffield" during May bank holidays, "Art in the Gardens" held in the summer Sheffield Botanical Gardens and is largest outdoor art show in north of England, and the Great Sheffield Art Show, previously held on the first weekend in July at the Octagon Centre in Sheffield, and since has been held later in the year at the Millennium Gallery.

Sheffield Museums Trust manages Sheffield City Council's museum collections and The Millennium gallery (approximately 800,000 visitors per annum in latter part of last decade), Graves gallery, Weston Park Museum, Kelham Island Museum, Abbeydale Industrial Hamlet and Shepherd Wheel Workshop: Sheffield Museums Trust are also custodians of the Guild of St George's Ruskin collection and the Ken Hawley Collection, together the foregoing collections comprises over a million items of local, regional, national and international significance. The Public Catalogue Foundation, (''the Foundation'') a charity registered numbers 1096185 and SCO 486011, was set up in 2002 to record the entire collection of oil paintings in public ownership in the UK via catalogues sponsored by Christies. The volume relating to the City of Sheffield at 2009 included over 2,400 paintings. In 2011 the Foundation in partnership with the BBC launched a 'Your Paintings' website. This partnership ended in 2016 and in its place Art UK (artuk.org) the operating name of the Foundation announced its purpose ''to complete a digital record of the UK's collection of oils, tempora, acrylic paintings and sculptures and to make it accessible to the public.'' A further stated aim of Art UK, is to record ''painted murals and Street Art across the UK''.

The Economic Development and Skills Policy Committee ('ECDSPC') of Sheffield City Council, in September 2022, adopted the Sheffield Culture Collective ('the Collective') strategy as an interim measure, and 'endorsed the priorities' in the strategy document, it repeated that commitment in January 2023 (for strategy document see www.sheffield-culture-collective.co.uk). The 'Collective' was formed in 2019, in response to recommendations of the Core Cities Cultural Enquiry 2019. The priorities 'endorsed' by ECDSPC above are four in number, namely the Tinsley Art Project, (originally comprising erection of four 100 feet chimney sculptures designed by Alex Chinnock, the sculptures to be seen from the M1 motorway due for completion in summer/autumn2024), Park Hill Art Space (a national flagship project and 'anchor institution of Park Hill's £100 million Urban Splash and Partners for Peoples regeneration programme, featuring art gallery, work space for artists and creative businesses, learning and community space, and heritage flats, ''surrounded by a 6-acre sculpture park''); Harmony Works (a £12 million Gateway Levelling Up funded project to transform the Grade II listed Victorian building Canada House (renamed Harmony) on Commercial Street Sheffield S1 into a music centre for young people now due to open in 2026)..and Graves Gallery (which vision of Sheffield City Council is for it to be hailed as 'the national gallery of the north') and Central Library. Sheffield City Council have recognised that the exterior of the 3 storey 'art deco' building erected in 1934, at 67–69 Surrey Street, Sheffield S1 1XZ, (housing both Graves gallery and Central Library )is in need of investment and was described as 'crumbling' by Sheffield Visual Arts Group at a meeting of the ECDSPC, on 18 January 2023.(''crumbling'' The Chair of The Economic Development and Skills Policy Committee (ECDSPC) of the Sheffield City Council replied that his Committee would be working 'with partners to progress the future redevelopment of Graves gallery and the Central Library [...] delay in the development of plans for the building was due to COVID-19 pressures, a change in the economic environment and budget pressures... the Accommodation Review is supporting 'a condition' review and an assessment of the necessary investment'(see ECDSP minutes for 18 January 2023 item 5). Alongside this, 'The Culture Collective, Museums Sheffield and Sheffield City Council are progressing the options work on the future vision for the building. Resources had been made available to undertake this 'visioning' and 'feasibility work' on the potential opportunity of the Graves gallery'(minuted as 5.3 of Minutes Wednesday 18 January 3.00 pm (item 5).

A 2022/3 planning application for the transformation of Castle Street, Sheffield includes new public art [...] Sheffield City Council as an added attraction expressed a desire to expose part of the castle and the River Sheaf.

The Pounds Park project is a new city centre play area at the heart of the city the programme of work and construction carried out by Henry Boot Limited which company also funded the play areas and public art content of the project. Pounds Park (named after a former chief fire officer) opened on 3 April 2023, ahead of schedule, on the site of the former fire station.

In February 2023 the Sheffield City Council adopted 'the Heritage Strategy for Sheffield 2021–2031', submitted to the council by Joined Up Heritage Sheffield (charity registered no. 1180945 formed in 2018). The strategy developed by the community rather than a local authority records a wide and varied range of heritage assets and then sets out to harness and enhance these in a 10-year action plan.

Reporting on Arts Council funding the Sheffield Star newspaper on 13 November 2022 publicised that Sheffield had received ''only a fraction of the money given to northern cities by the Arts Council'' Details of Art Council grants across the country allocated for 2023–2026, showed that Sheffield receives only £6.23 per head of population (£3.4 million in total) compared to Manchester's £44.41, Leeds's £35.65 and Newcastle's £29.74. The Arts Council makes funding decisions for National Portfolio Organisations (NPOS). Existing Sheffield art organisations which were NPOS prior to November 2022, were not disinvested, but a number of Sheffield art organisations/ studios were unsuccessful in their applications for NPOS funding. At 1 January 2023 the list of Sheffield art related NPOS are AA2A (Arts Access to Colleges), Arts Catalyst, Parents in Performing Arts (a new entrant), Sheffield Museums Trust and Yorkshire Artspace. A member of Sheffield Visual Arts Panel (set up to implement the vision for visual arts set out in Making our Way' 2019–2024' which followed an award in 2016 to Sheffield Culture Consortium of £550,000 from Arts Council England's Ambition for Excellence scheme for Sheffield 'Making Ways' project, a 'trailblazing' programme and legacy of Sheffield's 'highly successful' '2016 Year of Making'). However, this decade, Tyler Mellins, a member of Sheffield Visual Arts Panel, in an interview with Sheffield Culture Guide about being part of the 'Freelands Art programme' stated that Sheffield is packed full of amazing artists but there is not enough support and our own art organisations are underfunded.

Sheffield Culture Consortium was set up in 2012. Its current aims and purposes are to help all cultures and communities to be visible, and to tackle inequality in Sheffield through art and culture. These ambitions are also shared by Sheffield Collective, an organisation mentioned above. The Consortium is a voluntary working Group with part-time staff supported by Sheffield City Council, and it fully supports the recommendations of the Sheffield Racial Equality Report, published on 14 July 2022, which urges key organisations to work together to make and create Sheffield a city which actively fights racism. Art charities in Sheffield include Arts Catalyst, Ignite, Creative Sheffield, CADS, Audacious Art, Flourish, Art House, Site gallery, Yorkshire Art Space.

Wessex Archaeology charity no 287786 and SCO4236, in partnership with Sheffield Visual Arts Group, and a team of volunteers helped to create a free interactive digital map of Sheffield, featuring over 180 public art works.

== See also ==
- List of public art in South Yorkshire
