= Culture of Sheffield =

Sheffield has a growing cultural reputation. 7.2% of Sheffield's working population are employed in the creative industries, well above the national average of 4%. The music scene has produced many music acts during the last 25 years. It is also home to the largest theatre complex outside London. The council has attempted to build upon these foundations with the creation of the Cultural Industries Quarter. Sheffield made the shortlist for the first city to be designated UK City of Culture, but in July 2010 it was announced that Derry had been selected.

== Popular music ==
Sheffield has been the home of several well-known bands and musicians, with an unusually large number of synthpop and other electronic outfits hailing from there. These include the Human League, Heaven 17, Thompson Twins, Wavestar and the more industrially inclined Cabaret Voltaire. This electronic tradition has continued: techno label Warp Records was a central pillar of the Yorkshire Bleeps and Bass scene of the early 1990s, and has gone on to become one of Britain's oldest and best-loved dance music labels. In the 1990s Moloko and Autechre, one of the leading lights of so-called electronic listening music, were also based in Sheffield. The city was also home to Gatecrasher and Niche Nightclub, two of the most popular nightclubs in the north of England (although Gatecrasher is currently closed after a fire in 2007 and Niche is closed after a massive police raid in 2005, Niche has since had several ill-fated attempts at reopening, but seems to live on in the new Sheffield nightclub Tank). Sheffield also plays host to Made in Sheffield home to many successful local bands.

Sheffield has also seen the birth of Pulp, Babybird, Def Leppard, Joe Cocker, The Longpigs, and the free improvisers Derek Bailey and Tony Oxley. 1998 Mercury Music Prize award winners Gomez are also connected to Sheffield as some of the founding members went to Sheffield Hallam University together. The immensely successful Arctic Monkeys are currently Sheffield's biggest musical export, and have helped lead the way for chart hits for fellow Sheffield bands Milburn, Reverend and the Makers, Little Man Tate and The Long Blondes. Other successful Sheffield bands include Bring Me the Horizon, math rock band 65daysofstatic, glam-punk band Pink Grease, and quirky songsmith Stoney. Sheffield was home to the world-renowned Lindsay String Quartet, who retired from the stage in June 2005.

The city is home to one of England's larger indiepop communities. Bands such as Velodrome 2000 helped to create an indiepop scene during the late 1990s, which has since found a focal point in the Offbeat clubnight at the University of Sheffield. More recent local indiepop acts include Slow Down Tallahassee, The Parallelograms, Monkey Swallows the Universe and Pete Green. DIY non-profit-making promoters such as DaisyDaisyDoes and Sparklemotion are responsible for bringing UK and international indiepop acts to play live in Sheffield. Andrew Macdonald CEO and founder of primary brit independent labels Go Disc and Indipendiente is also from Sheffield.

Sheffield also has a small urban music scene. This consists of R'n'B, UK Hiphop/boombap, Grime, Bassline and Speed Garage. It is home to artists such as Hoodz Underground, Yeshua, Otis Mensah, DanimaL, The Ruby Kid, Toddla T The Red Eye Knights and Constant Creation, it is part of the Yorkshire Hip Hop scene. The Speed Garage scene has surfaced in Sheffield with a unique modern sound compared to older speed garage. Born from the nightclub Niche, the music has various other terms such as Bassline House or Niche itself, but was born in Sheffield and has now spread out to other cities in the United Kingdom. It varies differently from other cities Soulful Vocal UK Garage, and the beats are not two step.

The city's ties with music were acknowledged in 1999, when the National Centre for Popular Music, a museum dedicated to the subject of popular music was opened. It was not as successful as was hoped, however, and later evolved to become a live music venue, then in February 2005 the unusual steel-covered building would become the students' union for Sheffield Hallam University.

The three main music venues are the Sheffield Arena, the City Hall and O2 Academy for smaller acts. Other live music venues in the city include and The Leadmill, Corporation, the University of Sheffield, The Plug, and the Studio Theatre at the Crucible Theatre. Smaller venues supporting the local scene include The Frog and Parrot, Under The Boardwalk, The Grapes, D 'n' R and The Cricketers, The Harley, The Howard, and the now demolished Classic Rock Bar.

== Classical music ==
Sheffield is unusual for a city of its size in having no resident professional orchestra, but there are a number of amateur local orchestras including the Hallam Sinfonia, Sheffield Symphony Orchestra, the Sheffield Chamber Orchestra, the Sheffield Philharmonic Orchestra and the City of Sheffield Youth Orchestra. There are also many choirs within Sheffield; one semi-professional choir attached to the cathedral, and a number of amateur choirs including the Sheffield Oratorio Chorus, Chorus UK, The University of Sheffield Singers' Society, Hallam Choral Society, Sheffield Bach Society, The University of Sheffield Chamber Choir and Sheffield Philharmonic Chorus. The Lindsay String Quartet were based in Sheffield, and their members continue to be actively involved in the city's musical activities. The Concert Pianist Mark Gasser was born there, though he now lives in Australia. However he recently returned to perform with City of Sheffield Youth Orchestra. Music in the Round, which started off as an annual festival of chamber music has grown to be a year-round series of performances and tours with a resident group of professional players, Ensemble 360. The Sheffield Music Academy is an organisation for development of young musical talent across the region. Sheffield Music School provides chamber music coaching to sixty young musicians from across the city.

== Cultural Industries Quarter ==
The Cultural Industries Quarter has been established in the surrounding area of the Red Tape Studios. Other facilities include the National Centre for Popular Music, now used as a student union, the Leadmill nightclub and Sheffield Science Park. The Showroom Cinema shows independent and foreign films.

== Attractions ==
Tudor Square is the largest theatre complex outside London. It has two major theatres, the Lyceum Theatre and the Crucible Theatre as well as the smaller Studio Theatre. Other theatres include the Montgomery Theatre, Lantern and Merlin Theatres.

There are four major art galleries, the modern Millennium Galleries, Graves Art Gallery and the Site Gallery which specialises in multimedia. Other art galleries include Sheffield Institute of Arts Gallery, Bloc Projects, 35 Chapel Walk and S1 Artspace.

The city has several museums, including Weston Park Museum (formerly the Sheffield City Museum), the Kelham Island Museum, the Sheffield Fire and Police Museum, the National Videogame Museum, Abbeydale Industrial Hamlet and Shepherd Wheel.

The city also has a number of other attractions such as the Sheffield Winter Gardens and the Peace Gardens. The Botanical Gardens currently undergoing a £6.7 million pound restoration. There is also a city farm at Heeley City Farm and a second animal collection in Graves Park that is open to the public. Victoria Quays is also a popular canalside leisure and office quarter.

== Media and film ==
The films The Full Monty, Threads, and Whatever Happened to Harold Smith? were based in the city. F.I.S.T. also included several scenes filmed in Sheffield. Actor Sean Bean is from Sheffield and starred in When Saturday Comes, a film based upon his beloved Sheffield United Football Club. Sheffield's daily newspaper is the Sheffield Star, complemented by the weekly Sheffield Telegraph. The BBC's Radio Sheffield, and the independent Hits Radio South Yorkshire and sister station Greatest Hits South Yorkshire broadcast to the city. Sheffield is also home to an unusual and original group of filmmakers centering on the well established production studio Sheffield Independent Film. this company previously employing Jarvis Cocker and producing videos for the Arctic Monkeys and Mute Records Xerox Teens as well as BAFTA nominated independent films. Warp Films, producer of films such as Four Lions, Dead Man's Shoes, and This Is England, are also based in Sheffield.

== Festivals ==
Magners Grin up North - Sheffield Comedy Festival is a monthlong comedy festival in October and now the largest comedy festival in England. Open Up Sheffield is an annual event over the first two weekends in May where local visual artists and fine craft workers invite the public to their studios and other venues. The Sheffield International Documentary Festival, the UK's leading documentary festival, (now known as Doc/Fest) has been run annually since 1994. Summer Sounds is a yearly two-day world music event. Fright Night is a Halloween festival staged in the city centre and is billed as Britain's Biggest Halloween Party with a reported 38,000 people in 2008. Tramlines is an open air and multi-venue music festival which runs over a weekend in July. It began in 2009 and in 2010 attracted around 125,000 visitors to the city.

== Universities ==
Sheffield has two universities, the University of Sheffield and Sheffield Hallam University. The two combined bring 45,000 students to the city every year, including many from the Far East. As a result of its large student population, Sheffield has many bars, cafes, clubs and shops as well as student housing to accommodate them.

The University of Sheffield, a Red Brick university, has sites over a large area to the west of the city centre. It owns the Arts Tower, which was the tallest building in Sheffield from its construction in 1965 up until 2010, when it was surpassed by St Pauls Tower. It is still, however, the tallest university building in the UK. Sheffield Hallam University, a new university is based on a large campus in the city centre. Both universities have extensive links with local industry and the English Institute for Sport.

== See also ==
- Art in Sheffield
