= George Constantine =

George Constantine may refer to:

- George Constantine (racing driver) (1918–1968), American racing driver
- George Constantine (priest) (c. 1500–1560), British priest
- George Hamilton Constantine (1878–1967), British painter
- George Baxandall Constantine (1902–1969), English jurist
