= Natalia Luis-Bassa =

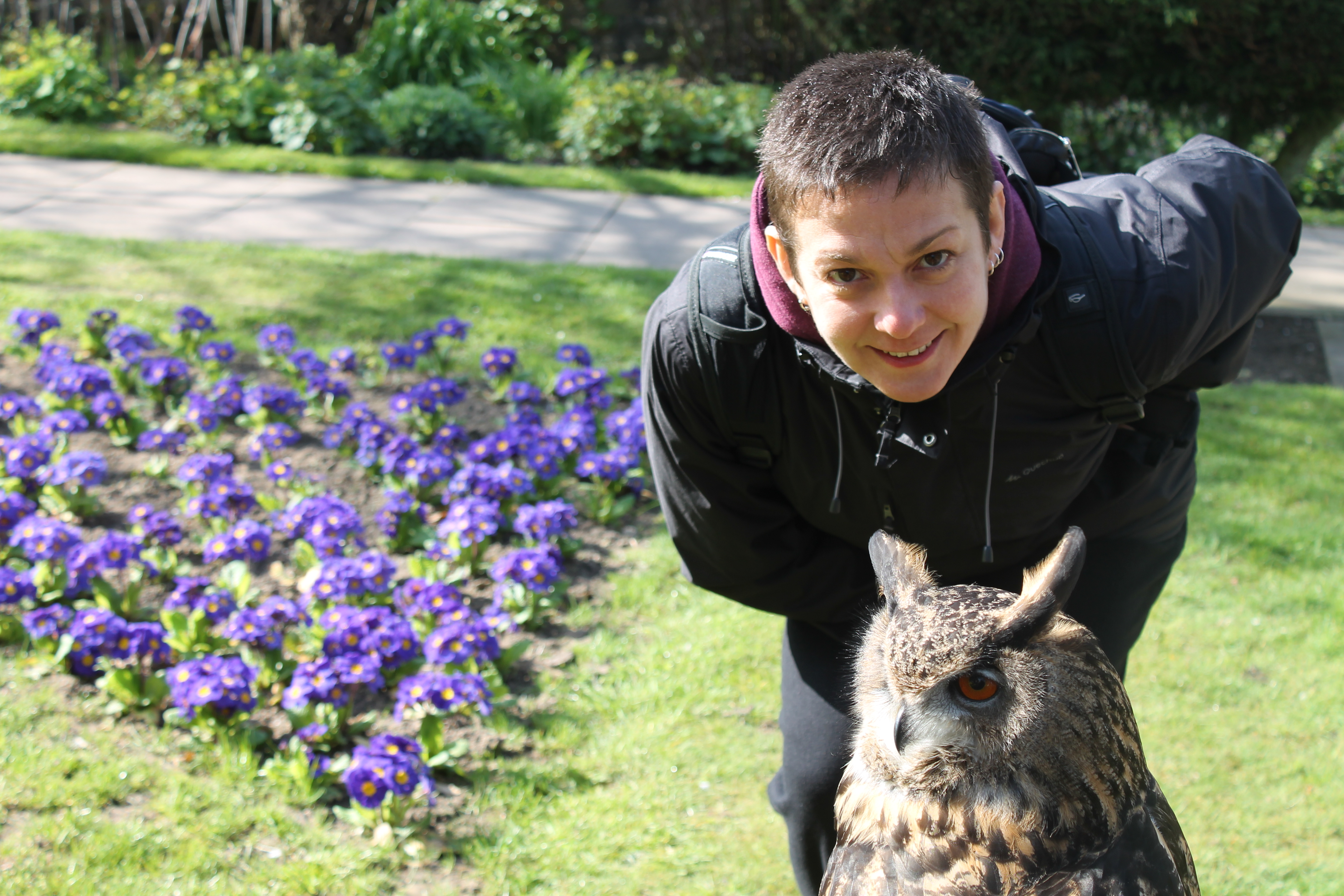

Background information
- Born: Natalia Rosalía Luis Bassa; 13 July 1966 (age 59); Caracas, Distrito Capital, Venezuela
- Genres: Classical
- Occupation: Conductor
- Instrument: Oboe
- Years active: 1991–present
- Website: natalialuisbassa.com

Natalia Luis-Bassa (born 13 July 1966, Caracas, Venezuela) is a Venezuelan conductor who lives and works in the UK, where she is Professor of Conducting at the Royal College of Music and Principal Guest Conductor of Oxford University Orchestra and Jersey Symphony Orchestra

== Life and career ==
A former student of El Sistema music education program, Luis-Bassa was the first woman who earned a degree in Orchestral Conducting in Venezuela. She studied Oboe with Lido Guarnieri and was later appointed music director of the Orquesta Sinfónica de Falcón.

Luis-Bassa completed her studies at the Royal College of Music in London, holding the RCM Junior Fellowship in Opera Conducting for two years. she holds a master's degree from The University of Huddersfield where she was a part-time lecturer and has been appointed Elgar Ambassador.

Since winning the second prize at the Maazel-Vilar Conductor's Competition in New York City in 2001, she has worked both in the United Kingdom and abroad.

As an advocate for music education for young people Natalia has established a long-standing association with the National Children's Orchestra of Great Britain and has built strong relationships with the Royal Conservatoire of Scotland, National Youth Orchestra of Scotland, National Youth Orchestra of Great Britain, London Symphony Orchestra, Benedetti Foundation, The Purcell School, Wells Cathedral School, Australian Youth Orchestra, Wellington College, Oasby Music Group, Derby & Derbyshire Schools' Orchestra, Yorchestra, Kent County Symphony Orchestra, Six Counties Symphony Orchestra/Cerddoriaeth Ieuenctid y Chwe Sir, Nottingham Youth Orchestra, Birmingham Schools Symphony Orchestra.

She has also taken her work and efforts to promote orchestral practice beyond the borders and has collaborated with the Association for Music in International Schools (AMIS) in Qatar in 2016, the Asia Pacific Activities Conference (APAC) in Beijing, China in 2018, in Jeju, South Korea in 2024, and the Australian Youth Orchestra in 2024.

Her advocacy for music education has prompted her to create links between university orchestras around the world, and to participate in concerts and workshops with the Oxford University Orchestra, Cambridge University Orchestra, Kent Youth Symphony Orchestra, Leeds Conservatoire, University of Madison Symphony Orchestra - Wisconsin, USA.

In August 2008 Luis-Bassa appeared in the reality TV talent show-themed television series, Maestro on BBC Two, as a mentor to David Soul. The Royal College of Music has appointed Natalia as a professor of conducting alongside Maestros Toby Purser and Peter Stark.

Luis-Bassa has worked with the National Children's Orchestra of Great Britain (NCO), conducting the London Regionals and running the Conductor's Course. She also conducted the Main Orchestra playing Danzon No. 2 by Arturo Márquez in the Summer Concert of 2011, and again playing the Symphony 2 by Sibelius in 2014. She has been noted among the NCO for her flamboyant conducting.

== Personal life ==
Her father, Germinal, was born in Barcelona, Spain. As a child, during the Spanish Civil War, he had to escape from Barcelona and went to France, the United States, Argentina and finally Venezuela, where he married Lillian, a Venezuelan whose parents were Spanish. Both of them were opera and zarzuela lovers. She grew up in a house full of music with her two sisters. Luis-Bassa now lives in West Yorkshire, the "Last of the Summer Wine" county.

Preceded by Position created	Principal Guest Conductor, Oxford University Orchestra; 2020–Present	Succeeded by Incumbent
Preceded by Hilary Davan Wetton	Orchestra Conductor, Wellington College; 2004–2024	Succeeded by Incumbent
Preceded by Richard Ellis	Music Director, Hallam Sinfonia; 2007–2019	Succeeded by Incumbent
Preceded by Roger Cann	Music Director, Haffner Orchestra; 2004–2014	Succeeded by Justin Doyle
Preceded by Arthur Butterworth	Principal Conductor, Huddersfield Philharmonic Orchestra; 2004–2010	Succeeded by Robert Guy
