= Snee =

Snee may refer to:

== Companies ==
- Snee-Oosh, Inc., an animation production company principally known for its series Hey Arnold!

== People ==
- Chris Snee (born 1982), former American football player
- Gordon Snee (1931–2013), British Abstract painter
- John Snee (born 1974), American former film and television actor

== Places ==
- Snee Oosh, a community in the US state of Washington
