= Danimal =

Danimal may refer to:

== People ==
- Danimal Cannon, the stage name of musician Daniel Behrens (born 1983)
- Danimal, a nickname of defensive lineman Dan Hampton (born 1957)
- DanimaL, the stage name of rapper Daniel Williams-Hashemi (born 1994)

== Other uses ==
- Danimals, an American brand of yogurt
