= Sheffield Legends =

Walk of fame in Sheffield, England

Sheffield Legends is a Walk of Fame located outside Sheffield Town Hall honouring famous people from or connected to Sheffield. As in the Hollywood version, there are plaques with famous people's names on them and why they are famous.

The idea was first suggested in 2005 when the people of Sheffield were asked who should be honoured after a local resident suggested honouring the footballer Gordon Banks, who grew up in Sheffield.

To date, the inductees are:

Name	Image	Occupation	Date of induction
Gordon Banks		Footballer	9 May 2006
Sean Bean		Actor	16 January 2010
Grace Clough		Paralympic gold medal winner	22 December 2016
Joe Cocker		Singer	15 December 2007
Sebastian Coe		Athlete and politician	21 February 2007
Def Leppard		Musicians	16 June 2006
Derek Dooley		Footballer	4 December 2007
Margaret Drabble		Novelist	30 May 2012
Jessica Ennis		Athlete	20 June 2011
Tony Foulds		Organized the "Mi Amigo" memorial flypast	2019
Barry Hancock		Oncologist	24 June 2010
Brendan Ingle		Boxing trainer	8 January 2008
Nick Matthew		Squash World Champion	4 September 2013
David Mellor		Cutler and designer	25 January 2007
Michael Palin		Comedian and television presenter	20 February 2007
Steve Peat		Mountain biker	28 October 2015
Joe Scarborough		Artist	3 June 2008
Helen Sharman		Astronaut	12 December 2006
Joe Simpson		Mountaineer	8 January 2008
Michael Vaughan		Cricketer	30 November 2009
Clinton Woods		Boxer	2010
Uriah Rennie		Football referee	2 February 2026
Julie Kenny		Businesswoman	2 February 2026
John Burkhill		Fundraiser	2 February 2026
Pulp		Musicians	2 February 2026
Herol Graham		Boxer	2 February 2026
Paul Carrack		Musician	2 February 2026
