= Ypres After the First Bombardment =

Painting by C.R.W. Nevinson

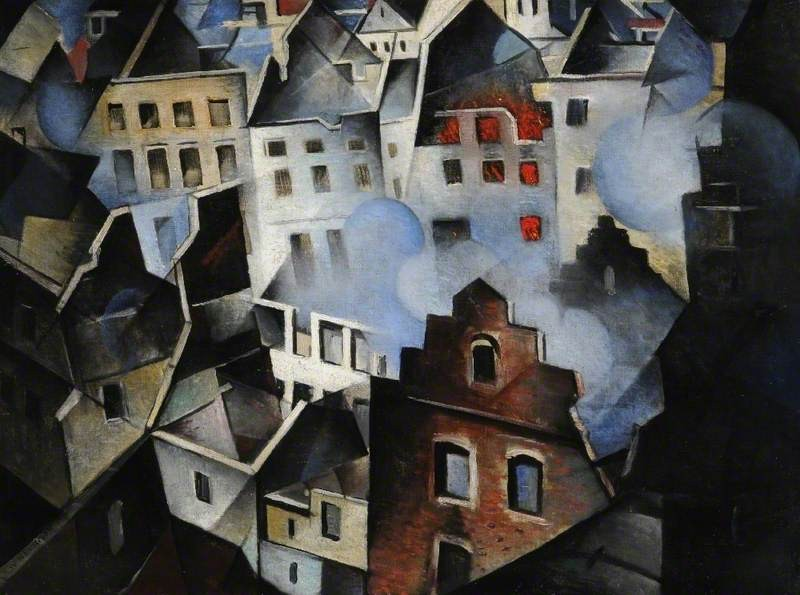
- Artist: C.R.W. Nevinson
- Year: 1916
- Type: Oil on canvas, war art
- Dimensions: 99.1 cm × 124.8 cm (39.0 in × 49.1 in)
- Location: Graves Art Gallery, Sheffield

Ypres After the First Bombardment is a 1916 oil painting by the British artist C.R.W. Nevinson. It depicts the aftermath of the German bombardment of the Belgian town of Ypres during the First Battle of Ypres in 1914. Shown from above it shows the still-smoking hollowed out buildings caused by the enemy artillery fire. The battle checked the German advance towards the English Channel ports.

Nevinson had belonged to the Futurist movement before the outbreak of the conflict and continued to use modernist techniques to depicting the war. The work was displayed at Nevinson's noted exhibition at the Leicester Galleries in London in 1916. The painting is now in the collection of the Graves Art Gallery in Sheffield, having been acquired in 1977 after previously being owned by the art dealer and collector Rex Nan Kivell. Nevinson also produced drypoints and etchings based on the painting.

== Bibliography ==
- Doherty, Charles Edward. Nash, Nevinson, and Roberts at War. University of Wisconsin, 1989.
- Ingleby, Richard. C.R.W. Nevinson: The Twentieth Century. Merrell Holberton, 1999.
- Tolson, Roger. Art from the First World War. Imperial War Museum, 2008.
- Walsh, Michael J.K. (ed.) Dilemma Of English Modernism: Visual and Verbal Politics in the Life and Work of C. R. W. Nevinson. Bloomsbury Academic, 2007.
