= Arthur Butterworth =

English composer and conductor (1923–2014)

Arthur Eckersley Butterworth, MBE (4 August 1923 – 20 November 2014) was an English composer, conductor, trumpeter and teacher.

== Biography ==
=== Early life and education ===
Butterworth was born in New Moston, near Manchester. His father ran the church choir, in which his mother played the piano and Butterworth himself sang. For the entrance fee of sixpence, Butterworth attended Hallé concerts. He also volunteered for the village brass band who allocated him the trombone. As a teenager he played with the Besses o' th' Barn Band and started taking conducting lessons. While playing with the band, he caught his trombone in tram tracks and, discouraged by the accident, changed to the trumpet.

His music teacher at North Manchester Grammar School, Percy Penrose, gave him much encouragement but his parents and headmaster tried to dissuade him from a full-time career. Five years in the wartime Army gave him little scope for music-making but Butterworth more than made up for it afterwards. In 1939, however, he won the Alexander Owen Scholarship for young brass players and had his first work played in public by the Wingates Band conducted by Granville Bantock. At the time, Butterworth was unaware of Bantock's fame, or that he was a friend of Jean Sibelius, whom Butterworth revered, but Bantock was nevertheless encouraging. At the Royal Manchester College of Music (now the Royal Northern College of Music), Butterworth studied composition with Richard Hall and also learned the trumpet and conducting. He studied composition with Ralph Vaughan Williams after writing to the composer in 1950, requesting lessons. He served as a trumpeter in the Scottish National Orchestra (now the Royal Scottish National Orchestra) from 1949–55 and in the Hallé from 1955–62; he also played as a freelance until 1963. In that year he began to teach at the Huddersfield School of Music, an activity which he combined with composing and conducting (he was for many years principal conductor of the Huddersfield Philharmonic Orchestra). He was made an MBE in 1995. He was unrelated to the composer George Butterworth (1885–1916).

=== Works ===
His works include seven symphonies, eight concertos, several other large orchestral scores, and a considerable amount of music for brass band. In the summer of 2008 Butterworth returned to the Royal Scottish National Orchestra to conduct a recording of his Fourth Symphony (1986) and his Viola Concerto (1988) with the English viola player, Sarah-Jane Bradley. The Sixth Symphony had its première in Saint Petersburg by St Petersburg State Capella Orchestra on 15 November 2009.

A selection of Arthur Butterworth's orchestral and chamber works have been released on the Dutton Epoch Label. The Viola Concerto and the Fourth and Fifth Symphonies are all performed by the Royal Scottish National Orchestra under the composer's baton. One of the releases also includes Barbirolli's 1958 mono recording of Butterworth's First Symphony, along with a series of reminiscences by the composer. A CD of Piano Trios is also available.

=== Personal life ===
He was married to Diana Butterworth, until her death in February 2013. He died on 20 November 2014 at Embsay, Craven, North Yorkshire and is survived by his daughters Nicola and Carolin.

Butterworth was appointed MBE in 1995.

== Selected works ==
=== Orchestral ===
- Suite for string orchestra, Op. 8 (1948)
- Sinfonietta, Op. 9 (1949)
- Legend, Tone Poem from Derbyshire M. for small orchestra, Op. 11 (1950)
- Symphony No. 1, Op. 15 (1957)
- The Path across the Moors, Op. 17 (1959); also for brass band
- Three Nocturnes: Northern Summer Nights, Op. 18 (1958)
- The Quiet Tarn (Malham), Op. 21 (1960)
- The Green Wind (Le vent vert), Op. 22 (1960)
- A Dales Suite (Embsay), Op. 24b (1981); also for brass band
- Symphony No. 2, Op. 25 (1964)
- The Moors, Suite for large orchestra and organ, Op. 26 (1962)
- Italian Journey (Roma; Ravello, Rimini), Op. 34 (1966)
- From the Four Winds (Horologion Andronicus) for large orchestra and organ, Op. 40 (1971)
- Gigues, Scherzo, Op. 42 (1969)
- Symphony No. 3 Sinfonia Borealis, Op. 52 (1979)
- Pageantry, Op. 48 (1973)
- September Morn, Symphonic Study, Op. 62 (1983)
- Nex Vulpinus (The Fox) for string orchestra, Op. 63 (1981)
- Beowulf for string orchestra, Op. 68 (1982)
- Symphony No. 4, Op. 72 (1986)
- Northern Light, Symphonic Study, Op. 88 (1991)
- Solent Forts, Concert Overture, Op. 90 (1992)
- Mancunians for large orchestra and brass band, Op. 96 (1995)
- Ragnarök, Concert Overture, Op. 97 (1995)
- Symphony No. 5, Op. 115 (2001–2002)
- Mill Town, Op. 116 (2003)
- Symphony No. 6, Op. 124
- Capriccio Pastorale for small orchestra, Op. 125
- Coruscations, Op. 127 (2007)
- Entre chien et loup, Op. 130
- Scherzo for small orchestra, Op. 131
- Grey Moorland, Concert March, Op. 134
- Symphony No. 7, Op. 140 (2011)

=== Brass band ===
- The Path across the Moors for brass band, Op. 17b (1964); original version for orchestra
- A Dales Suite (Embsay) for brass band, Op. 24a (1965); also for orchestra
- Three Impressions, Scenes from 19th Century Northumberland for brass, Op. 36 (1968)
- Ballad for brass band, Op. 39 (1962)
- Blenheim, Heroic Overture for brass band, Op. 43 (1972)
- St. Gertrude for brass band, Op. 44 (1969)
- Revelation, Concert March for brass band, Op. 45 (1966)
- Caliban, Scherzo malèvolo for brass band, Op. 50 (1978)
- Nightflight, Symphonic Study for brass band, Op. 57 (1973)
- Winter Music for brass band, Op. 71 (1978)
- Odin, from the Land of Fire and Ice for brass band, Op. 76 (1986)
- Sinfonia for Brass: Maoriana for brass band, Op. 85 (1990)
- Paean for brass band, Op. 86 (1990)
- Passacaglia on a Theme of Brahms for brass band, Op. 87 (1991)
- Suivez la raison, Concert March for brass band and organ, Op. 92 (1993)

=== Wind Band ===
- Mancunian Way for wind band, Op. 66 (1985)
- Winter Music for wind band, Op. 71 (1978)
- Tundra, Boreal Suite for large wind band, Op. 75 (1979)

=== Concertante ===
- Concertante for 2 oboes, 2 horns and string orchestra, Op. 27 (1962)
- Concerto for organ, string orchestra and percussion, Op. 33 (1973)
- Duo concertante for oboe, harpsichord and strings, Op. 35 (1967)
- Concerto for violin and orchestra, Op. 58 (1978)
- Summer Music, Concerto for bassoon and orchestra, Op. 77 (1985)
- Scherzo and Canzona for bass trombone and brass band, Op. 80 (1984)
- Concerto for viola and orchestra, Op. 82 (1988–1992)
- Concerto alla Veneziana for trumpet and brass band (or orchestra), Op. 93 (1992)
- Concerto for cello and orchestra, Op. 98 (1997)
- Guitar Concerto, Op. 109 (2000)
- Sinfonia Concertante for euphonium, baritone and brass, Op. 111 (2001)
- Gog and Magog for double bass and string ensemble, Op. 118
- Capriccio for violin and Orchestra, Op. 139

=== Chamber music ===
- Sonata for oboe and piano, Op. 5 (1947)
- Trio for oboe, clarinet and bassoon, Op. 6 (1947)
- Modal Suite for flute, clarinet, bassoon, trumpet, violin, viola and cello, Op. 7 (1947)
- Romanza for horn and string quartet with double bass ad libitum (or piano), Op. 12 (1951)
- Suite for viola and cello, Op. 13 (1951)
- Sextet for flute, oboe, clarinet, horn, bassoon and piano, Op. 16 (1957)
- Scherzo for brass quartet, Op. 19 (1956)
- Three Dialogues for 2 treble instruments, Op. 20 (1962)
- Trio cornet, tenor-horn, trombone, Op. 28 (1962)
- A Triton Suite for 3 trumpets, 3 trombones and tuba, Op. 46 (1972)
- Sonata for double bass and piano, Op. 47 (1970)
- Berceuse for oboe and piano, Op. 51 (1971)
- Aubade for flute and piano, Op. 53 (1973)
- Fanfare and Berceuse for trumpet and piano, Op. 54 (1975)
- Ludwigstanz, Recreation for 6 clarinets, Op. 56 (1975)
- A Gabriel Sonata for trumpet and organ, Op. 59 (1976)
- Flamboyance for trumpet (or cornet) and piano, Op. 64 (1977)
- Leprechauns for 2 oboes and cor anglais, Op. 67 (1978)
- Héjnal for trumpet and piano, Op. 69 (1979)
- Piano Trio No. 1, Op. 73 (1983)
- Sonatina for violin and piano, Op. 74 (1979)
- Sonata for viola and piano, Op. 78 (1986); premiered by Cecil Aronowitz and Terence Weil
- Three Night Pieces for trumpet and piano, Op. 81 (1987)
- Partita for euphonium and piano, Op. 89 (1991)
- Quartet for brass instruments, Op. 91 (1992)
- Piano Quintet, Symphonic Variations for piano and string quartet, Op. 95 (1995, revised 1998)
- Wedding Music for trumpet and organ, Op. 99 (1996)
- String Quartet, Op. 100 (1997, revised 2011)
- Morris Dancers for 4 horns, Op. 101 (1997)
- Actaeon's Ride for woodwind and brass ensemble, Op. 102 (1997, revised 1998); commissioned for, and premiered by the Mayfield Wind Sinfonia, Sheffield.
- Bubu for English horn, viola and harp, Op. 107 (1999)
- Pastorale for viola and piano, Op. 112 (2002)
- The Sands of Dee for double bass and piano, Op. 117
- Three Lyric Pieces for tuba (or cello, or double bass) and piano, Op. 119 (2003)
- Piano Trio No. 2, Op. 121 (2004)
- Undiné for flute and piano, Op. 128
- Sonata for bass oboe (or heckelphone) and piano, Op. 132
- Soliloquy for cello and piano, Op. 136

=== Carillon ===
- Kendal Clock (Tinnitis Aurium Kendaliensis 1189–1989) for carillon, Op. 84 (1989)

=== Organ ===
- Partita on a German Chorale, Op. 2 (1947)
- Organ Sonata, Op. 106 (1998)

=== Piano ===
- Lakeland Summer Nights, Op. 10 (1949)
- Five Caprices, Op. 23 (1960)
- Schubert Variations, Op. 114

=== Vocal ===
- Now on Land and Sea descending for contralto and orchestra, Op. 1 (1947)
- Three German Folk Songs for tenor and piano, Op. 3 (1947)
- Four Nocturnal Songs for soprano and piano, Op. 4 (1948)
- The Night Wind for soprano, clarinet and piano (or orchestra), Op. 38 (1969)
- Ancient Sorceries for countertenor, recorder and harpsichord, Op. 49 (1975)
- The Great Frost for narrator and orchestra, Op. 94 (1993)

=== Choral ===
- A Moorland Symphony for bass solo, chorus and orchestra, Op. 32 (1967)
- Trains in the Distance for speaker, tape, chorus and orchestra, Op. 41 (1971)
- Five Part Songs for male chorus and piano, Op. 55 (1978)
- Hunter's Moon, 3 Songs for male voices and piano, Op. 60 (1979)
- The Owl and the Pussy Cat for chorus, brass band and jazz group, Op. 61 (1979)
- Haworth Moor, 3 Songs for chorus and piano, Op. 110 (2000)
