= George Fullard =

English sculptor

George Fullard ARA (15 September 1923 – 25 December 1973) was an English sculptor.

Born in Sheffield on 15 September 1923 Fullard served with the 17th/21st Lancers during World War II and was severely wounded at the Battle of Cassino. He studied at the Sheffield College of Arts and Crafts, and the Royal College of Art. By 1958 John Berger, the art critic of the New Statesman, regarded him as Britain's best young contemporary sculptor. He began to exhibit in the UK and abroad (at Pushkin Museum of Fine Arts Moscow in 1957) and win prizes: for example, "Running Woman", which can be seen in the grounds of Upper Chapel in Sheffield city centre. won a junior prize in John Moores Liverpool exhibition in 1957.

Fullard's works feature extensively in public and private collections including Sheffield Galleries and Museums, the British Museum, the Arts Council Collection, the Tate in London and the Art Gallery of South Australia, situate in Adelaide.

Fullard taught at a number of schools of art including the Royal College of Art. He was Head of Sculpture at Chelsea School of Art (1963-73)

Fullard was elected an Associate of The Royal Academy in April 1973 before his death in the same year on 25 December 1973.

A major retrospective of his work was exhibited at Graves Art Gallery, Sheffield in the spring of 2023.
