= Joe Scarborough (artist) =

British artist

- Born: 1938 (age 87–88); Pitsmoor, Sheffield, England, UK
- Occupation: Artist
- Years active: 1960s–2025
- Website: https://joescarboroughart.co.uk/

Joe Scarborough (born 1938) is a retired English artist. He is known for painting humorous scenes of Sheffield life, and everyday "real" images of the life and people of South Yorkshire.

== Early life and education ==
Joe Scarborough was born in Pitsmoor, Sheffield, in 1938. An only child, his father was a foreman in a steelworks who worked for English Steel Corporation, and his mother, a pianist, died from a brain tumour when he was eight years old. As a child, he lived in a flat on Buchanan Road. He later said that he could remember her mother's "speech was slurred as if she were drunk" and during her final days, he was sent to live with a cousin in Cleethorpes for two weeks and was not allowed to attend her funeral.

Scarborough says he was "breast-fed on socialism and the great move forward". Joe started drawing and painting as a child, doodling trains and planes on the back of his father's pink report cards from work.

He went to Pye Bank school, and then Marlcliffe School, which existed between 1915 and 1964, until the age of 16.

== Early jobs ==
After leaving school with three O-levels, Scarborough began work as a laboratory assistant at the Batchelors processed food company. When he turned 18, he became a face worker at the colliery at Thorpe Hesley, and was inspired to paint by the contrast of the darkness of the mines and the lightness of the real world above the ground.

He worked in the colliery for five and a half years before he left following an accident that required 27 stitches. Afterwards, he worked numerous jobs - labourer, municipal park gardener and a dishwasher for some years, nurturing a dream to be a full-time painter. He also worked as a doorman in a theatre, which inspired one of his later paintings, The Phantom of the Opera.

== Career ==
For years Scarborough pushed a handcart packed with paintings round all his local pubs, selling what he could. He started by painting ships, but they did not sell, and then started painting buildings, which were more successful. He sold his first painting for £5.

He eventually got his big break when Cyril Caplin, a local businessman, offered him £35 a week over the course of two years to paint. By the end of the two years, Scarborough had painted around 70-80 paintings. The Register of Naive Artists gave Scarborough his works their first showing, in London, but they received a scathing review in The Guardian, and he returned to Sheffield.

Scarborough's first one-man show lasted for two years at the Attic Cafe near Sheffield's main bus station. Solo and group exhibitions followed, which took the everyday scenes of Yorkshire life from Sheffield to Rotherham to London, to San Francisco to Chicago and back to Sheffield. He painted an artwork in the now closed Castle Market which was "30-odd-feet long, eight feet high and weighs three quarters of a tonne".

In 1986, Scarborough painted a 25-foot (7.6 m) mural on the Odeon Cinema on Burgess Street in Sheffield within a one-year time limit for £11,000. The cinema had many renovations over the years, and for decades it was believed that the painting had been demolished during a previous construction. In 2025, the mural was found still intact, hidden under layers of chipboard and plasterboard;

An exhibition of Scarborough's work, entitled Then and Now, ran at the Showroom Cinema, Sheffield from 28 July to 19 September 2025.

In an interview in August 2025, Scarborough said he was "semi-retired" but on 7 October of the same year, he announced on Facebook that he had fully retired.

== Recognition ==
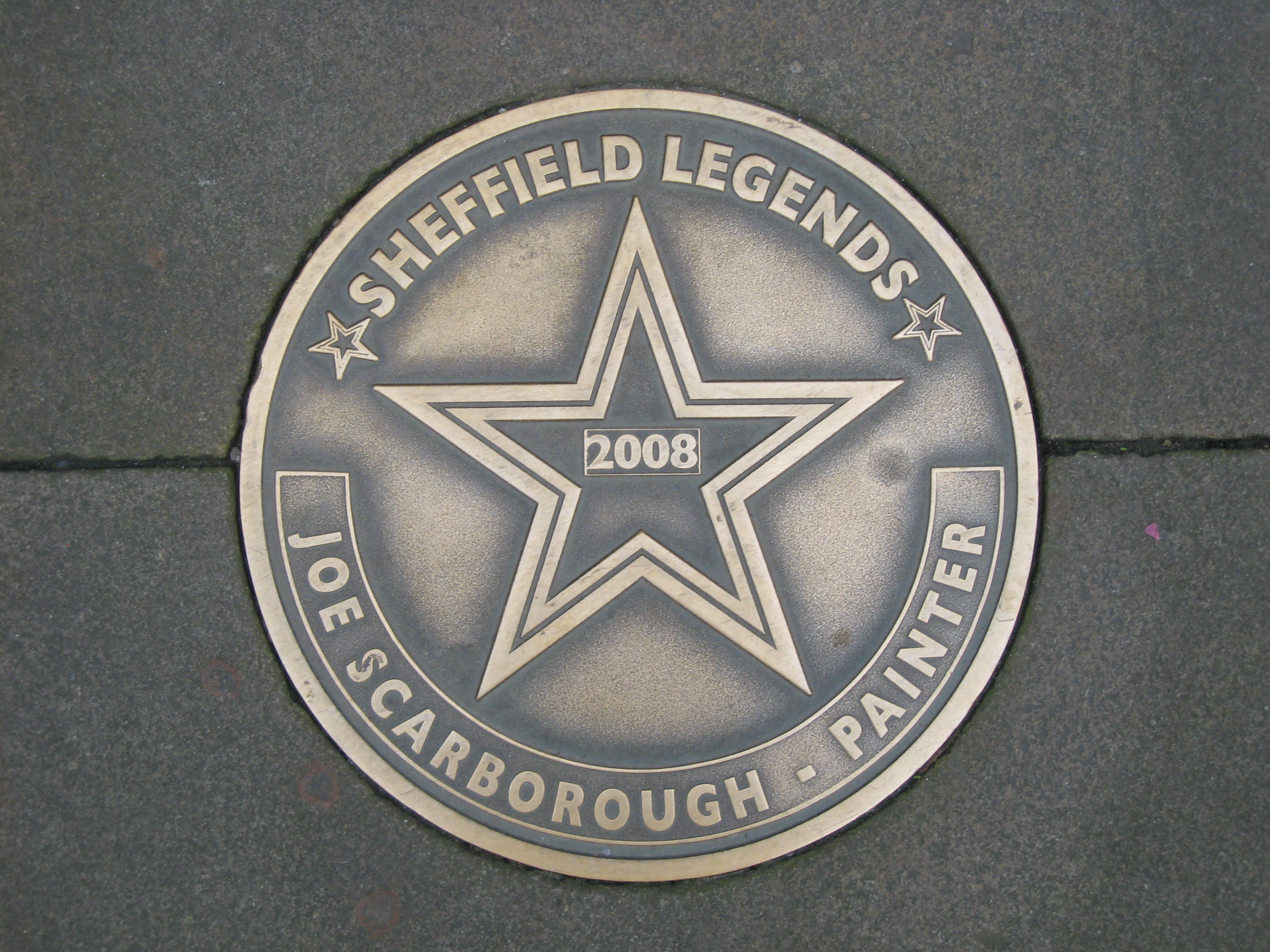
Sheffield Legend plaque

In 2008 Scarborough was commemorated as one of the Sheffield Legends with a star on the "Walk of Fame" outside Sheffield Town Hall.

His paintings now appear in several major collections, and numerous works have been imprinted.

Sixteen of his paintings are in Sheffield public art collections, including Sheffield Museums and Sheffield Hallam University. His largest work, "Sheffield Through the Ages", which is 30 ft (9.1 m) 8 ft (2.4 m), is held by the Weston Park Museum.

== Style ==
Scarborough's style of painting was described in a 2023 interview with Dawson Auctions as: "depicting day to day life in busy city scenes, working men’s clubs and packed theatres; he cleverly uses buildings, modes of transport and people, all drawn to one scale, to create a foreground and background for his paintings."

Scarborough cited Jacques Henri Lartigue as an influence.

== Personal life ==
Scarborough was married: his wife, Audrey, was born in Alberta, Canada. She died in 2002 after suffering from Alzheimer's disease. The month following his wife's death, Scarborough sold his 11-bedroom house in Nether Edge for £144,000 and bought a £26,500 narrowboat on Victoria Quays in Sheffield.

As of 2008, Scarborough was in a relationship with a librarian called Eunice.

He suffered a suspected heart attack in November 2021 but recovered fully.
