= Portrait of Hortense Mancini =

1693 painting by Godfrey Kneller

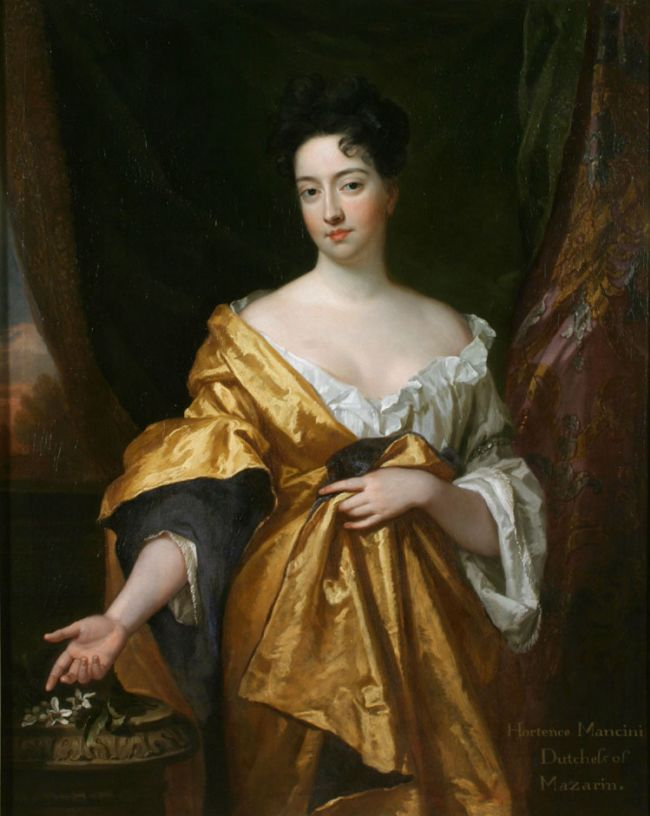
- Artist: Godfrey Kneller
- Year: 1693
- Type: Oil on canvas, portrait painting
- Dimensions: 147.4 cm × 122.7 cm (58.0 in × 48.3 in)
- Location: Graves Art Gallery, Sheffield

Portrait of Hortense Mancini is a 1693 portrait painting by the German-born British artist Godfrey Kneller. It depicts the Italian courtier Hortense Mancini. One of five sisters who were nieces of Cardinal Mazarin, the long-standing French Chief Minister, who were celebrated for their beauty and known as the Mazarinettes.

She is best known as one of the mistresses of Charles II of England. Kneller was Principal Painter in Ordinary and enjoyed decades of success painting the British elite. Today the painting is in the collection of the Graves Art Gallery in Sheffield, having been acquired in 1973.

== Bibliography ==
- Goldsmith, Elizabeth C. The Kings' Mistresses: The Liberated Lives of Marie Mancini, Princess Colonna, and Her Sister Hortense, Duchess Mazarin. PublicAffairs, 2012.
- Jardine, Lisa. On a Grander Scale: The Outstanding Career of Sir Christopher Wren. HarperCollins, 2003.
- Wright, Christopher. The World's Master Paintings: From the Early Renaissance to the Present Day . Routledge, 1992.
- Zuvich, Andrea. Ravenous: A Life of Barbara Villiers, Charles II's Most Infamous Mistress. Pen and Sword History, 2024.
