= John Knox Reproving Mary, Queen of Scots =

Painting by William Powell Frith

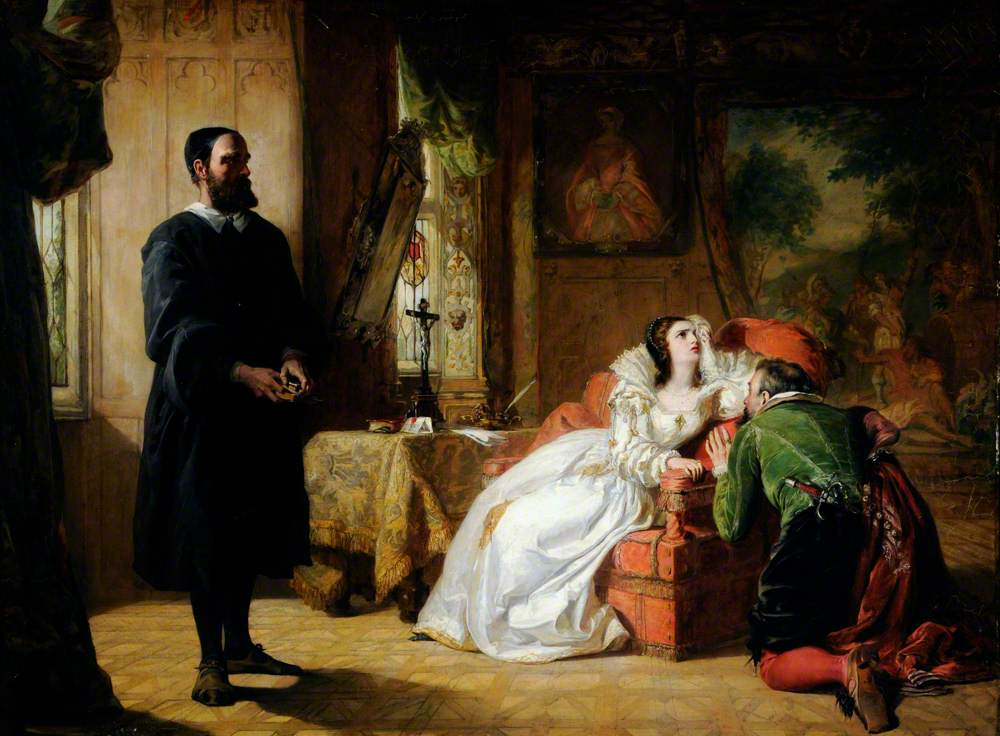
- Artist: William Powell Frith
- Year: 1844
- Type: Oil on canvas, history painting
- Dimensions: 72.3 cm × 97.2 cm (28.5 in × 38.3 in)
- Location: Graves Art Gallery, Sheffield

John Knox Reproving Mary, Queen of Scots is an oil on canvas history painting by the British artist William Powell Frith, from 1844.

== History and description ==
It depicts the fourth of a series of audiences where John Knox, a leading reformer of the Church of Scotland, confronted Mary, Queen of Scots about her planned marriage to Lord Darnley. Frith drew on the account of the meeting in Thomas McCrie's 1813 Life of Knox. While the reproving Knox stands tall, another reformer, Sir John Erskine is shown on his knees pleading more gently with the queen for her to change her mind.

Frith formed part of the group of artists known as The Clique. He became best known for his depictions of everyday Victorian life such as The Derby Day and The Railway Station. He displayed this painting at the Royal Academy Exhibition of 1844 held at the National Gallery in London. Today it is in the collection of the Graves Art Gallery in Sheffield, having been acquired in 1887.

A smaller, replica version was produced by Frith in 1861 and was auctioned by Christie's in 1997.

== Bibliography ==
- Noakes, Aubrey. William Frith, Extraordinary Victorian Painter. Jupiter, 1978.
- Green, Richard & Sellars, Jane. William Powell Frith: The People's Painter. Bloomsbury, 2019.
