= Huddersfield Philharmonic Orchestra =

- Orchestra
- Huddersfield Philharmonic Orchestra logo
- Former name: ‘Mr Thomas’s Band’, Fitzwilliam Street Philharmonic Society
- Founded: 1862
- Principal conductor: Katherine Stonham
- Website: www.huddersfieldphilharmonic.co.uk

The Huddersfield Philharmonic Orchestra is an amateur orchestra based in Huddersfield, West Yorkshire, England.

== Origins ==
In 1862 the first orchestra in Huddersfield to achieve lasting permanence was established by Rev JH Thomas, as ‘Mr Thomas’s Band’. It changed its name to the Fitzwilliam Street Philharmonic Society and then ultimately Huddersfield Philharmonic Orchestra.

S H Crowther, in An Orchestral Centenary (about the orchestra’s history) claimed 1871 as the date of creation of the ‘Huddersfield Phil’ and the orchestra duly celebrated its centenary in 1971. However R A Edwards later pointed out in And the Glory (his history of Huddersfield Choral Society) that this claim was inaccurate; and the society’s present archivist now confirms that it was shortly after Thomas’s death that the orchestra renamed itself the Huddersfield Philharmonic, giving its first concert under that name on 7 February 1885.

The Rev J H Thomas was a Cambridge graduate, expert linguist and accomplished musician, who was initially ordained into the Church of England but who later abandoned Anglicanism in favour of Unitarianism. In 1862 he came to Huddersfield as Unitarian minister in Fitzwilliam Street, where he remained until his death in 1884.

Among the Rev Thomas’s successors as conductors was John North (conductor also of the Choral and Glee & Madrigal Societies). He began his working life as a butcher’s errand boy at the age of nine. A vacancy soon arose for an errand boy at Joe Wood’s music shop (founded in 1850) and Johnny North was taken on. This was to transform his life completely. Encouraged by Joe Wood he became an adept pianist and reliable tuner; he also took up the cornet and developed into a fine violinist. In his short and crowded life (he died at the age of 39) he held various posts as organist; in addition to the Huddersfield Choral Society, he conducted the Holmfirth and Keighley Societies and also further afield.

The programmes given by the orchestra in John North’s day were typical of the period with a multiplicity of items; the orchestra played nothing more substantial than an overture, and vocal and instrumental solos predominated. The October 1888 concert, for instance, featured two vocalists, two pianists and a violinist; the purely orchestral works ranged from Rossini’s Semiramide overture and a gavotte (True Love) to a selection from Cellier’s Dorothy and a Waldteufel waltz. Three years later a similar programme was given, though this did contain a full concerto – Mendelssohn’s First Piano Concerto played on the ‘grand pianoforte’ by Master G G Stocks.

== Early years ==
For many years before and during the First World War the orchestra was conducted by another prominent local musician, J E Ibeson (a descendant of whom is a current playing member). At some time he was succeeded by Frederick Dawson, a leading concert pianist and former pupil of Grieg. He in turn was succeeded by J Fletcher Sykes in 1920; some time in the early 1930s the latter was briefly followed by F W Sykes, about whom nothing is known.

== Orchestra during and after the wars ==
The inter-war years were a difficult time for orchestras, professional as well as amateur, and the Huddersfield Phil was no exception. One factor peculiar to Huddersfield exacerbated matters. Arthur Willie Kaye was a local musician of humble origin who by dint of self-sacrifice and sheer hard work had turned himself into one of the country’s greatest violin teachers (it is estimated that he launched over 100 violinists on professional careers); and in Huddersfield at any rate, he had become a ‘legend in his own lifetime’. He formed his own symphony orchestra with enormous string sections drawn mainly from his own pupils: for concerts, brass and woodwind were imported from the Hallé. Though this orchestra’s ascendancy in the 1920s was short-lived, at that time it completely eclipsed the Phil. The Phil also faced competition from another body about which little is known – the Huddersfield 'Permanent' Orchestra. In the 1930s, says Crowther (op cit) the orchestra’s fortunes fell further ‘…. on one occasion it looked as if there were more players on the platform than there were men and women in the audience.’

But despite that depressing outlook, the members of the Phil persevered and their persistence was to be rewarded. Some signs of better days ahead had already appeared when T H Crowther became the orchestra’s conductor in 1935 (a concert in 1936, for instance, included Franck’s Symphonic Variations and Tchaikovsky’s ‘Pathétique’ Symphony) . During the Second World War, the orchestra continued to rehearse, but gave only one concert (in April, 1943, when the Town Hall was filled to capacity). In the absence of Crowther through illness, this concert was conducted by William Rees.

At the end of the war the Society was determined to raise both its standards and its profile. A major decision was that the Society should engage a professional conductor and in 1946, following the resignation of T H Crowther, William Rees took up the post. A one-time student under Felix Weingartner and former violinist with the Hallé, Rees was an experienced musician who quickly became a firm favourite with orchestra and audience alike. His appointment marked a definite turning-point: from then on, the orchestra’s rise to its present eminence as one of the country’s leading non-professional orchestras was steady and assured. A notable early concert occurred in 1947 when Margaret Binns made her first appearance as Leader, a post she was to hold with great distinction until her retirement in 1982. Also in that year, Geoffrey Phillips was appointed Treasurer: he was to remain a member of the committee for over 40 years until his death. The concert of 1 May 1995 was dedicated to a celebration of his life.

In 1952 the orchestra gave the first performance in Huddersfield of Beethoven’s ‘Choral’ Symphony (the choir was the now defunct Huddersfield Vocal Union). In 1954 the Brunswick Symphony Orchestra came to Huddersfield as guests of the Phil, and the Phil visited Brunswick in the following year. The programme, which included Dvořák’s Eighth Symphony and soloist Margaret Binns in Mozart’s Violin Concert in A (K219), was very well received.

A characteristic feature of the Rees years was the development of a repertoire which was both solid and enterprising. In 1956, for instance, works ranged from Brahms’ Fourth Symphony to Rodrigo’s Guitar Concerto (at the time both the work and the soloist – Julian Bream – were relatively unknown). In 1958 a bold programme featured Brahms’ Alto Rhapsody and Wagner’s rarely heard Love Feast of the Apostles (in which the orchestra was joined by the Colne Valley Male Voice Choir). The orchestra was responsible for the first Huddersfield performance of the Beethoven triple Concerto (with ‘local’ soloists Margaret Binns, Pauline Dunn and Keith Swallow). William Rees’ retirement in 1964 was a matter of great regret; for almost twenty years he had enjoyed an exceptionally warm rapport with members of the orchestra, but it was understood that the time had come when he wished to be released from the strain of the road journey from his home in Lytham St Anne’s for rehearsals and concerts.

His successor, Arthur Butterworth, had already acted as the orchestra’s associate conductor. Originally a trumpeter with the Scottish and Hallé orchestras, he had given up his playing career in order to concentrate on conducting and composing, in which his reputation was steadily growing. (His skill as an orchestrator was recognised by Barbirolli who more than once called upon him, in the Hallé’s cash-strapped 1950s, to cue the parts of unaffordable ‘extras’ into those of standard instruments.) Butterworth was to conduct the Phil for the next 30 years. He inherited a well-established, confident orchestra – already large, it was to grow under him still further (in the 1971-72 Centenary [sic] Season no fewer than 113 players are listed in the programme including an amazing 81 strings).

In the 1960s amateur orchestras began to leave the safe havens of the classical core repertoire, and Butterworth relished the opportunity to steer the orchestra’s great potential into previously uncharted waters. Not that he had a free hand in the matter: nowadays conductors are usually titled ‘artistic directors’ and wield the powers implicit in that title, but in 1964, as was the way with organisations like the Phil ‘the committee’ reigned supreme – even in the choice of repertoire and soloists. The conductor was consulted on these matters but he had no executive powers. Soon after Butterworth’s appointment he suggested that the orchestra should play Elgar’s Enigma Variations for the first time. His proposal was accepted, though not without some misgivings on the part of the committee that such a ‘difficult’ work should be tackled. Nowadays the programming of such a work would be seen merely as routine.

In fact Butterworth was able to persuade the committee to expand the repertoire in all directions. Standard classics were not neglected (there were memorable performances of Beethoven’s Eroica and, in the Centenary [sic] Season, with the Huddersfield Choral Society, that composer’s Ninth Symphony) but works as diverse as Hindemith’s Symphonic Metamorphoses, Berlioz’s Harold in Italy, Prokofiev’s Firth Symphony, Respighi’s The Pines of Rome, Janáček’s Sinfonietta, Holst’s The Planets and the Mussorgsky/Ravel Pictures at an Exhibition figured in Butterworth’s early years. His predilection for the music of Sibelius was also gratified: over the years four of the seven symphonies were played. His own music was occasionally performed and he was commissioned to write a work for the Centenary Season. From the Tower of Winds was the result.

== Modern orchestra ==
It was in the late 1970s that the orchestra first tackled a Mahler symphony. At that time The Daily Telegraph's northern edition (edited by the music critic and author, Michael Kennedy) ran a weekly ‘Music in the North’ column and in one such edition he drew attention to the performance, noting that he would never have anticipated the day when an amateur orchestra would play a Mahler symphony. In singling out the Phil he was according it a well-deserved accolade.

Later years brought performances of Béla Bartók's Concerto for Orchestra, Edward Elgar's Falstaff, Claude Debussy's La mer and Benjamin Britten's "Four Sea Interludes". In 1989, after 25 years in office, Arthur Butterworth hinted that he did not plan to go on indefinitely though it was not until 1993 that he gave his final concert.

Butterworth was succeeded by Rupert D'Cruze. Originally trained as a trombonist, D'Cruze soon turned to conducting, winning prizes in competitions in Hungary and Japan in 1992. D’Cruze broadened the orchestra’s repertoire even further, showing an especial proclivity for the music of Gustav Mahler. The orchestra performed of the Sixth Symphony in 1995, and the First and Fifth were also performed under his leadership. In 1997 the orchestra gave the world premiere of All The Long Night Through, a commissioned piece from Bill Connor, for piano, percussion and orchestra. In 1997 they performed of Igor Stravinsky's The Rite of Spring, reviewed in the Yorkshire Post in the following glowing terms:

‘…(this work) long feared by the best of performers, was undertaken with immense confidence and vigour. This performance worked because D'Cruze not only knew that score extremely well but succeeded in shaping its disparate sections into a satisfying whole…’

The years 2000 and 2001 saw the Phil produce a CD of significant performances whilst planning major concerts, including performances of Sally Beamish’s concerto for saxophone, The Imagined Sound of Sun on Stone, with John Harle as soloist and another huge Mahler symphony, his third. When John Harle was taken ill, a potential problem became the beginning of a new musical friendship when his place was taken by Jack Liebeck, in a performance of the Mendelssohn Violin concerto. A reviewer from the Huddersfield Examiner commented “Clearly, members knew this piece but, to dust it down in one hour and give such a performance demonstrates the talent which the Huddersfield Philharmonic has in its ranks.” If this concert tested the abilities of the players, the plans for Mahler’s Third Symphony were to With the sudden unavailability of Rupert D’Cruze, Nicholas Cleobury stepped in to take on the task of performing Mahler’s Third Symphony and, following this success, he was appointed as Principal Guest Conductor within two years. He has attracted comments including:

‘Guest conductor Nicholas Cleobury paid the orchestra the supreme compliment of making no concession to its “amateur” status’

(Huddersfield Examiner 23 April 2001, review of Mahler concert).

‘Nicholas Cleobury turned what could have been a hairy experience into a convincing one, full of raw energy and glittering colour’

(Yorkshire Post, 22 April 2002, review of Walton’s Belshazzar’s Feast).

The latter concert, featuring Huddersfield Choral Society, was dedicated to the memory of Maurice Wray, orchestral manager of the Phil for some eleven years and who had been the prime mover and shaker in bringing the two organisations together on stage. Sadly, Maurice had died just 2 months before the concert. Further memorable concerts conducted by Nicholas have included February 2005's Richard Strauss' Also sprach Zarathustra and Michael Tippett's A Child of Our Time in November of the same year, as well as the closing concert of the Saddleworth Festival in June 2007.

By autumn of 2002 the Phil was auditioning for a new Principal Conductor, a process which was to take almost two years, but which resulted in the appointment of Natalia Luis-Bassa, a prize-winner in the Maazel-Vilar Conductor's Competition of 2002 and the first person in Venezuela to receive the B Mus in orchestral conducting. Natalia’s audition concert (February 2004) included a performance of Elgar’s Cockaigne Overture and Elgar has remained at the heart of her continuing relationship with the orchestra. 2007 was the 150th anniversary of the birth of Elgar and the April performance of his second Symphony with the Phil won Natalia the Elgar prize. She followed this up by conducting the first performance of the work in Venezuela with the Simon Bolivar Youth Orchestra, with their principal conductor Gustavo Dudamel in the audience.

February 2008 saw a packed Town Hall, and heard the voice of Robert Powell as narrator in Sergei Prokofiev's Peter and the Wolf, which the Huddersfield Examiner described as "utterly engaging and absorbing... Here was an opportunity for various sections of the orchestra to shine and, without exception... they excelled."

== Notable members ==
- Wallace Hartley, violinist and bandleader on the ill-fated RMS Titanic
- Andrew Clark, Principal Cellist of the Jefferson Symphony Orchestra in Golden, Colorado.

== Bibliography ==
- Smith, A. (editor). "Music Making in the West Riding of Yorkshire", privately published by Wood, R.H. (2000). ISBN 0-9539885-0-3.
