= The Piazza Navona at Rome =

Painting by David Roberts

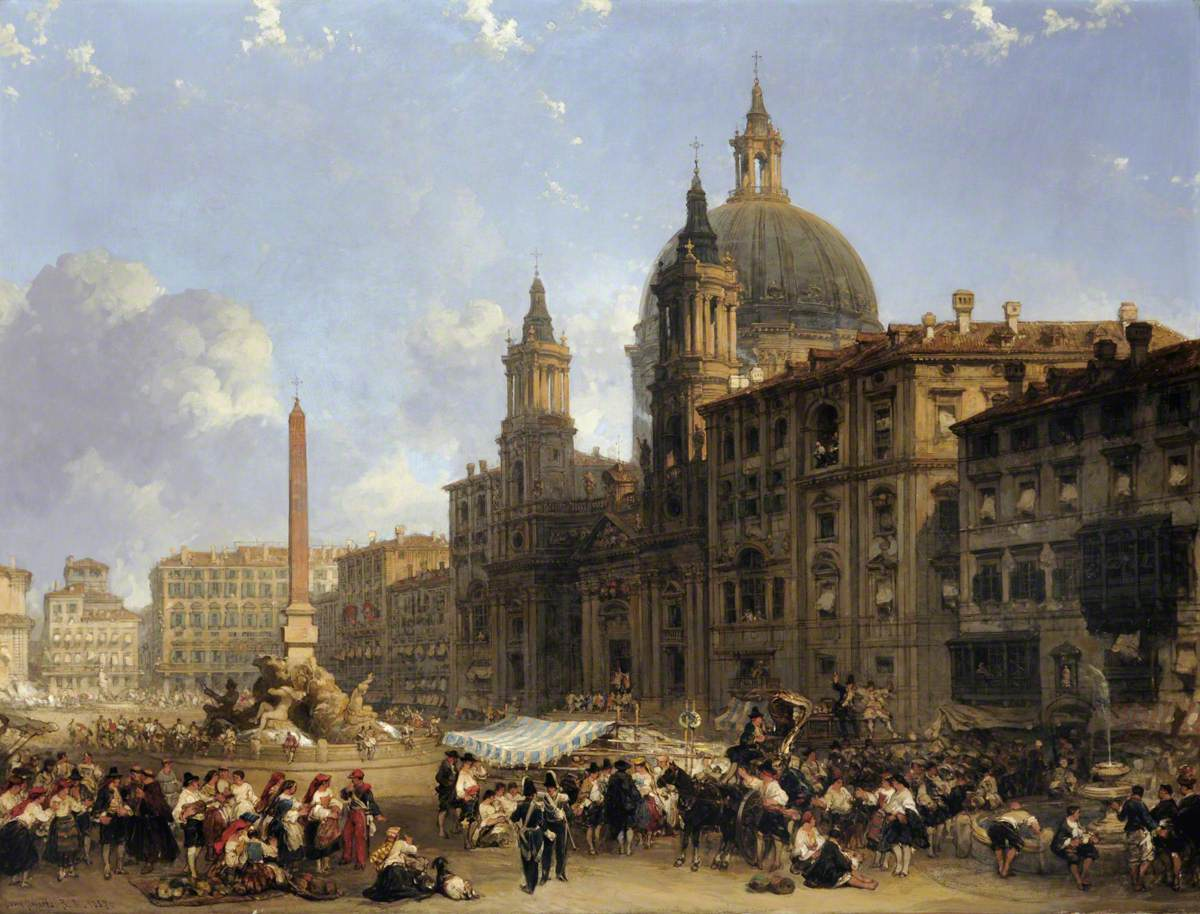
- Artist: David Roberts
- Year: 1857
- Type: Oil on canvas, landscape painting
- Dimensions: 127.5 cm × 156.7 cm (50.2 in × 61.7 in)
- Location: Graves Art Gallery, Sheffield

The Piazza Navona at Rome is an 1857 landscape painting by the British artist David Roberts. A cityscape, it features a view of the Piazza Navona in Rome. Built on the site of the Ancient Roman Stadium of Domitian, it features a number of baroque buildings. A Romantic painter who has begun his career in set design for the theatre, Rovers enjoyed success for his Orientalist depictions of the Middle East. He also frequently depicted panoramas of Continental Europe.

The painting was displayed at the Royal Academy Exhibition of 1857 at the National Gallery in London. The British Quarterly Review considered it contained his "usual excellence". It is today in the collection of Graves Art Gallery in Sheffield, having been bequeathed in 1887.

== Bibliography ==
- Guiterman, Helen. David Roberts, 1796-1864, Artist, Adventurer. Scottish Arts Council, 1981.
- Sim, Katherine. David Roberts R.A., 1796–1864: A Biography. Quartet Books, 1984.
