= Bundit Ungrangsee =

Thai conductor (born 1970)

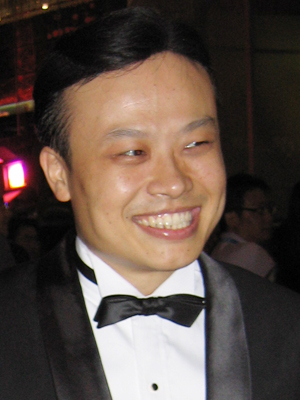
- Born: 7 December 1970 (age 54); Songkhla, Thailand
- Education: University of Michigan
- Occupation: Conductor
- Spouse: Mary Ungrangsee (m. 2001)
- Website: www.bundit.org

Bundit Ungrangsee (Thai: บัณฑิต อึ้งรังษี; RTGS: Bandit Uengrangsi, born December 7, 1970) is a Thai symphonic conductor.

Thai-born and of Chinese descent, Bundit Ungrangsee was named one of two co-winners and Laureates of the inaugural Maazel-Vilar International Conductors' Competition held at Carnegie Hall in New York City in September 2002. Since then, Ungrangsee has built a career as an international guest conductor, regularly leading orchestras in primarily Europe and Asia.

His work includes Principal Guest Conductor of the Seoul Philharmonic Orchestra and regularly conducting orchestras in Italy, including Orchestra Internazionale d'Italia. Over the course of his career, he has held posts as music director of the Young Musician's Foundation Debut Orchestra in Los Angeles, Associate Conductor of the Utah Symphony, Cover Conductor for the New York Philharmonic, Associate Conductor of the Charleston Symphony Orchestra and Principal Guest Conductor of the Charleston Symphony Orchestra.

Bundit was among the honorees for the Thai Ministry of Culture's Office of Contemporary Art and Culture's Silpathorn Award in 2005. He was also named a "Cultural Ambassador".

Among the artists with whom he has worked are Maxim Vengerov, Julia Migenes, Joseph Alessi, the LaBeque Sisters, Paula Robison, Christopher Parkening, Christine Brewer and Elmer Bernstein.

In 2005, Ungrangsee was one of three international conductors invited to actively take part in the historic development of the Seoul Philharmonic Orchestra into a world-class musical institution. He was also given the post of Principal Guest Conductor of that orchestra and conducted numerous concerts with the orchestra. In June 2007, he invited the orchestra to give a concert tour in his home country, Thailand.

In September 2002 Ungrangsee was named Laureate and Co-Winner in the inaugural Maazel-Vilar International Conductors' Competition held at Carnegie Hall in New York City. The prize, awarded by a distinguished panel of judges including Lorin Maazel, Kyung-Wha Chung, Glenn Dicterow and Krzysztof Penderecki, recognizes him as first among the 362 competitors from 40 countries in the competition. At the conclusion of the competition, Maazel told the audience, "You are seeing the future of classical music."

A Thai conductor of Chinese descent, Mr. Ungrangsee is the first Thai to have won awards in many prestigious international conducting competitions. Other competition prizes include Winner of the International Competition for Young conductors in Lisbon, Portugal (1999). In 2002, he placed fourth among 37 conductors from over 20 nations in the Hungarian TV-Radio International Conducting Competition in Budapest. He also was a semi-finalist in the prestigious Besançon Competition in France in 1998.

Among the teachers he recognizes as his main influences are world-renowned conducting teacher Jorma Panula and Maestro Lorin Maazel, music director of New York Philharmonic Orchestra. Maestro Maazel said of Bundit that “He is on his way to becoming a major force in the world of conducting,” and privately trained him over a period of three years. Bundit received his master's degree in Conducting from the University of Michigan.

== Personal life ==
Bundit converted to The Church of Jesus Christ of Latter-day Saints in 2000. He married Mary Jane Jones in Salt Lake City, Utah, in 2001. They have four daughters.
