= John Burkhill =

English Charity fundraiser (born 1939)

Harold John Burkhill (4 January 1939) is an English fundraiser, better known as The Man with the Pram.

== Life ==
Harold John Burkhill was born 4 January 1939 in Sheffield, South Yorkshire. He began fundraising for Macmillan Cancer Support in 1993, following the death of his daughter Karen. He is known for pushing a pram around Sheffield City Centre, whilst wearing a green wig.

== Recognition ==
Burkhill was awarded a British Empire Medal in the 2013 New Years Honors. In 2021, he was awarded Freedom of the City of Sheffield.

In 2023, he was awarded the ITV Fundraiser of the Year at the Pride of Britain Awards after successfully raising £1,000,000.

On 2 February 2026, he was awarded a star on the Sheffield Legends walk of fame.

On 29th September 2026, his star was unveiled on the Sheffield Legends Walk of Fame at Sheffield Town Hall.
