= The Steel Man =

Coordinates: 53.424878°N 1.407001°W

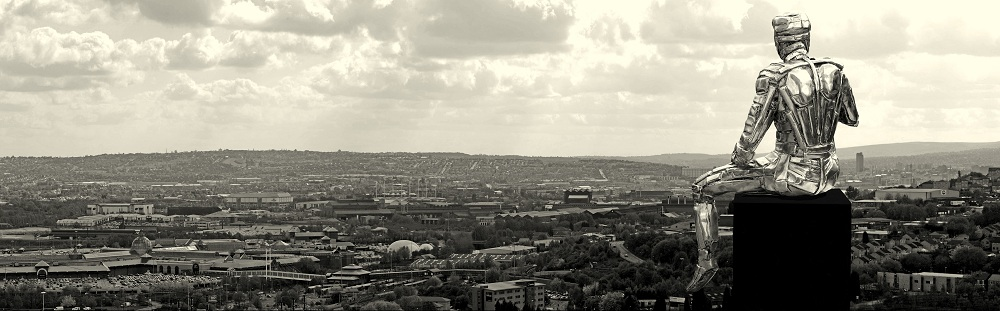
The Steel Man (artist impression), Steve Mehdi

The Steel Man (formerly Man of Steel) will be a 32-metre-high sculpture and visitor centre located in Rotherham, at Junction 34 of the M1. Its plans, designed by sculptor Steve Mehdi, were approved in 2012.

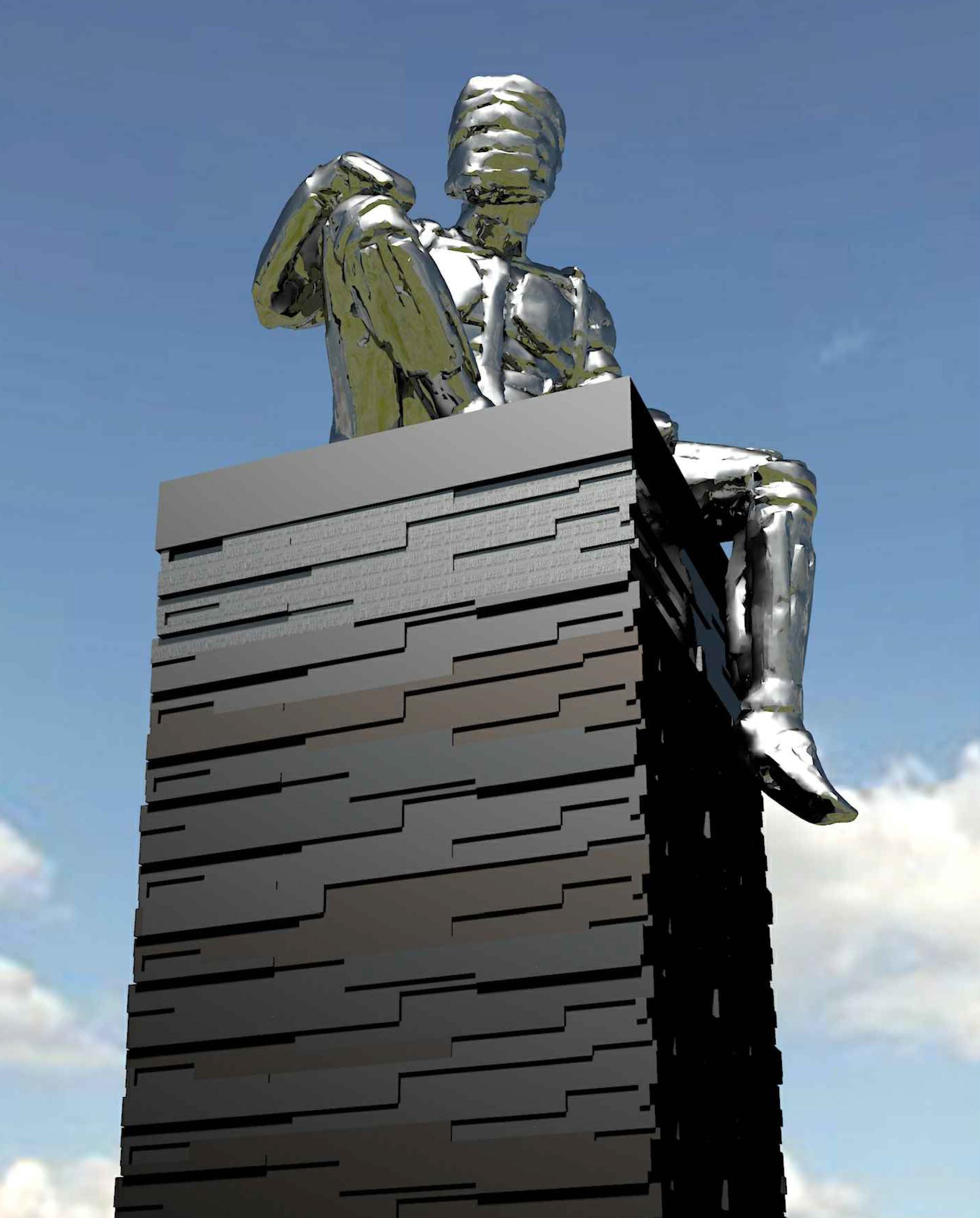
The Steel Man gateway sculpture, Steve Mehdi

To help fund the project, a 'Heart of Steel' appeal was launched in July 2014. A 2.5 metre, 1.5 tonne "Heart of Steel" will sit inside the figure, with up to 150,000 names of people from across the region engraved on it.

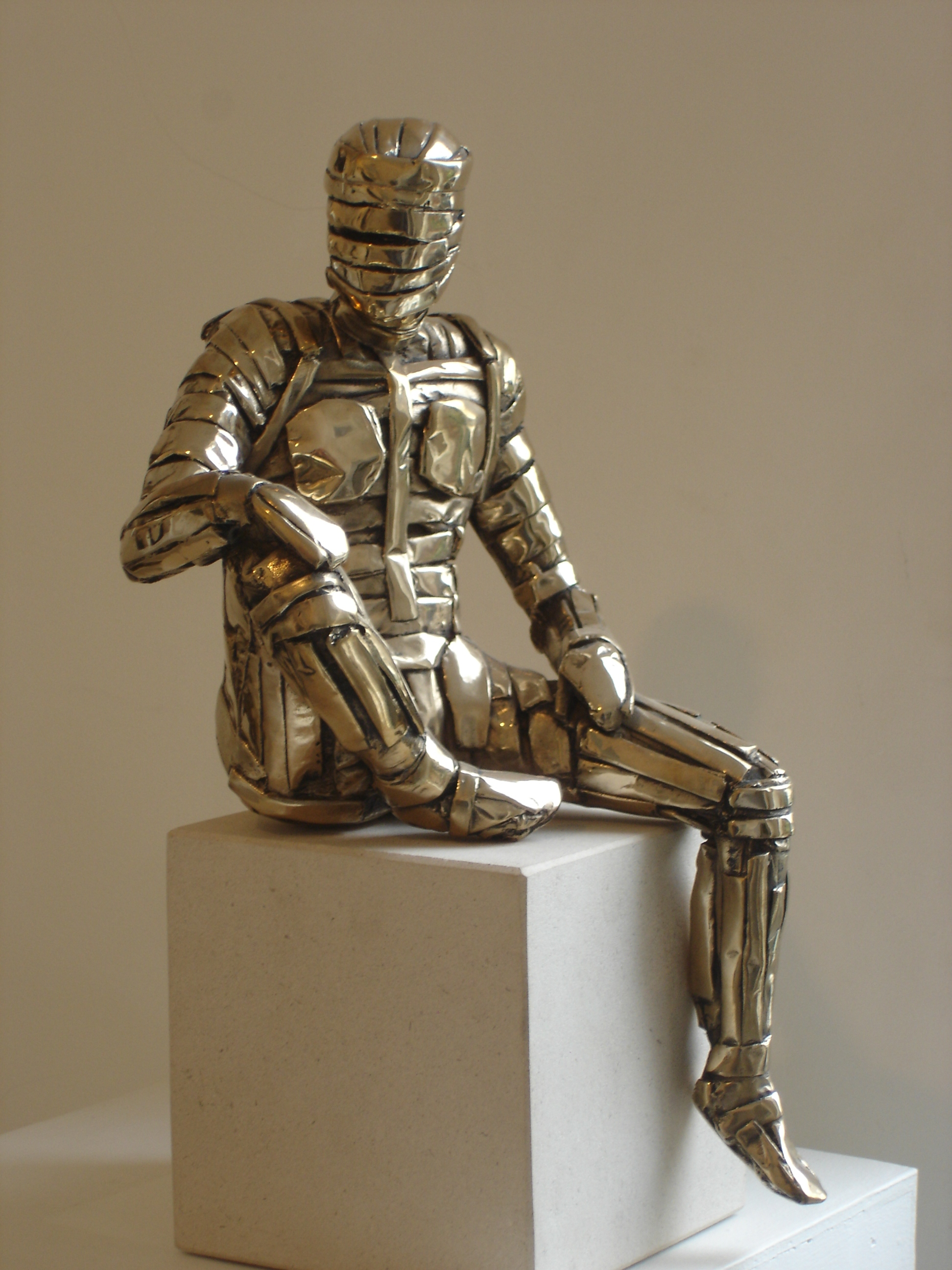
Steel Man, bronze, Steve Mehdi
