= Access Space =

Coordinates: 53.37608°N 1.46761°W

Access Space is an open digital arts lab in Sheffield in the United Kingdom. It is the longest running free media lab in the UK, practising and promoting sustainability through re-use of technology. The lab has been funded by the Arts Council of England, the European Social Fund of the European Union, and the National Lottery of the UK.

== About ==
Access Space has showcased the Redundant Technology Initiative, only using hardware that it got for free and rejuvenating it with free/open source software. Its works have also included the Zero Dollar Laptop project, where redundant technology is made useful, used in workshops with homeless and vulnerable people, who keep the laptops they have installed. The Access Space model is itself an open project, and their "Grow Your Own Media Lab" initiative has inspired centres across Europe and Brazil. Their work also extends beyond the digital, such as supporting explorations of technology through traditional craft.

Performance given (interior) during Sheffield Placard festival in 2011

== Recognition ==
The significance of Access Space's work in education and skill development has been recognised in academic research into models for emerging economies. Access Space have also been recognised as one of Britain's "New Radicals" in a report co-sponsored by The Observer newspaper and the National Endowment for Science, Technology and the Arts (NESTA).

== Location ==
In 2020 Access Space left its original venue on Brown Street in Sheffield, in late 2022 announcing a new series of events at its new home as part of Sheffield's event central initiative on Fargate.
