= Maazel-Vilar Conductor's Competition =

The Maazel-Vilar Conductor's Competition is a conducting competition founded in 2001. Reflecting the shared vision of its founders, conductor Lorin Maazel and philanthropist Alberto Vilar, the competition aims to give exceptional opportunities for career development to young talented conductors.

The competition is an international event. In 2001–02 it held six regional rounds worldwide, in London, Cracow, Sao Paulo, Tokyo, Sydney, and Bloomington, Indiana, leading up to a final round at the Carnegie Hall in New York City in September 2002. At each stage, the candidates did not compete against each other for ranking by a jury, but rather were measured against a standard set to demonstrate outstanding potential. This open competitive process, under the guidance of Lorin Maazel, was designed to educate all of the participants about the breadth of skills a successful conductor must have and the rigorous training required to master those skills.

In the 2002 event, from the four candidates remaining at the final stage, two were selected as prizewinners: Bundit Ungrangsee and Xian Zhang. The other finalists were Joji Hattori and Natalia Luis-Bassa.

After delays in receiving funding from Alberto Vilar, Lorin Maazel said that he had put up his own money and sought other sources to pay for the final stages of the 2002 competition.
