= List of public art in South Yorkshire =

This is a list of public art in the county of South Yorkshire, England. This list applies only to works of public art on permanent display in an outdoor public space. For example, this does not include artworks in museums.

== Barnsley ==
Image	Title / subject	Location and coordinates	Date	Artist / designer	Type	Material	Dimensions	Designation	Owner / administrator	Wikidata	Notes
	Can You See Us?	Stairfoot	2022	Andrew Small	Sculpture						
	Colour Pop	Stairfoot	2022	Lenny & Whale	Sculpture						

== Sheffield ==
Image	Title / subject	Location and coordinates	Date	Artist / designer	Type	Material	Dimensions	Designation	Owner / administrator	Wikidata	Notes
	The Ali Babas	High Street				Sandstone					
	The Cutting Edge	Railway Station				Steel					
	Double Somersault	Sheffield Children's Hospital	1976	William Pye	Sculpture	Stainless steel	12ft				
More images	Drakes Descent	Drakes house Retail Park, Near Crystal Peaks	1998	Walenty Pytel	Sculpture	Welded Steel	4m				Drakes Descent Sculpture by Walenty Pytel 1998, 3 Drakes coming in to land on top of a 4m high grey painted steel post.
	Rain	Winter Garden entrance			Sculpture	Metal					
	Sheen	Howard Street				Sandstone and stainless steel					Dedicated to comedian Marti Caine
	Vulcan	Castle House	1962	Boris Tietze	Sculpture	Fibreglass					
	Women of Steel	City Hall, Baker's Pool	2016	Martin Jennings	Sculpture	Bronze					
	Allen the Peregrine	Outside the University of Sheffield’s Diamond building	2017	Jason Heppenstall	Sculpture						
More images	Pan: Spirit of the Wood	Sheffield Botanical Gardens	1934		Sculpture						
