= Hallam Sinfonia =

The Hallam Sinfonia is an amateur orchestra based in Sheffield, England. It was formed in 1973 as a chamber orchestra, and has since grown into a full-size symphony orchestra. Natalia Luis-Bassa was named musical director in 2007.
