= Wavestar =

English new-age instrumental music duo

- Origin: England
- Genres: New-age
- Years active: 1983–1988
- Labels: Audion Recording Company
- Past members: John Dyson; David Ward-Hunt

Wavestar was an English new-age instrumental music duo active in the 1980s. Formed in 1983, the band consisted of John Dyson and David Ward-Hunt, both of Sheffield. Dyson and Ward-Hunt shared production and arrangement of the band's music. Both musicians contributed synthesizers, keyboards and sequencers, while Dyson also played guitar.

The duo formed after Dyson responded to an advertisement placed by Ward-Hunt. They toured throughout the United Kingdom as well as playing in France and released three albums, Mind Journey, Zenith and Moonwind. Allmusic in its review of 1987's Moonwind, released on the now defunct US label Audion Recording Company, noted influence of Tangerine Dream, Kitaro and the electronic rock of Europe, describing the album as "excellent electronic music" and "a rather essential space music release." In its 1988 review of Moonwind, Stereo Review recommended its readers "keep an ear out" on the band, but the band dissolved shortly thereafter without issuing any more albums, stressed by the bankruptcy of Audion Recording Company's parent record label, Jem Records, which never issued funds to the pair for the Moonwind release.

Dyson continued to work solo, releasing albums and contributing to various compilations. Ward-Hunt died in 1999.

In 1997, Dyson released a fourth Wavestar album, Out of Time, composed primarily of material the duo had recorded between 1986 and 1988, which was intended to have gone into the follow-up to Moonwind.
