= Sheffield Chamber Orchestra =

Small classical music orchestra

- Small classical orchestra
- Logo of the SCO as of 2025
- Short name: SCO
- Founded: 1950
- Location: Sheffield, England
- Principal conductor: Laurence Perkins
- Music director: Laurence Perkins
- Website: scorchestra.uk

The Sheffield Chamber Orchestra is a small classical music orchestra founded in 1950. As of 2025 the orchestra comprises about 35 players, mostly amateur musicians. The orchestra performs thrice annually in churches around the city of Sheffield. The orchestra is a member of the Making Music organisation. They play a variety of classical music, from the baroque period to contemporary compositions. The group's headquarters are at 73 Holmley Lane in Dronfield, S18 postal district. Since 2024, Laurence Perkins has been the orchestra's principal conductor and artistic director.

Its founders included Stewart Deas, a professor of music at the University of Sheffield, and Eric Laughton, a professor of Latin at the same institution; Deas died in 1985 and Laughton in 1988, but The Times noted the orchestra, as well as another organisation Deas founded, the Sheffield Bach Society, continued "to play an active part in Sheffield's musical life". In fact, the orchestra was known until 1955 as the "Sheffield Bach Orchestra". The orchestra, as well as the Bach society, were both associated with the university, although by no means exclusively composed of university people. Since 1979 the orchestra has been a registered charity in the United Kingdom. As of 2025 there were five trustees and the group had a total expenditure of around £12,000 in the 2024 financial year.
