= Sheffield Hallam University Gallery =

Art gallery in Sheffield, England

Coordinates: 53.376°N 1.469°W

Sheffield Hallam University Gallery is a university art gallery in Sheffield, England. Part of Sheffield Hallam University the gallery is based in the Old Head Post Office On Fitzalan Square. It is open to the public. The gallery aims to bring nationally and internationally recognised works of art, design and media arts to Sheffield as well as showing some of the work of academics and students in the Sheffield Creative Industries Institute. The gallery programme reflects the teaching and research interests of the institute and individual exhibitions are curated by academic specialists in the university.
