= Gordon Snee =

British abstract painter who began work in the late 1940s

- Self portrait (notebook sketch), 1954
- Born: 15 January 1931; Burnley, Lancashire, England
- Died: 18 January 2013 (aged 82); Willingham-by-Stow, Lincolnshire, England
- Education: Slade School of Art
- Known for: Painting, drawing.

'With the TA', 1955, Oil on Hardboard

Untitled, 1984, Acrylic on paper & board

Untitled, 1987, Acrylic on canvas

Untitled, 1998, Acrylic on paper & board

Gordon Snee (1931 - 2013) was a British abstract painter who began work in the late 1940s. During his lifetime he rarely exhibited his work. It was only after his death in 2013 that his life's work was revealed. Snee has been described as an "outstanding talent", "one of the 'lost painters' of the post-war period, and "one of the finest post-war abstract painters".

== Biography ==
Gordon Snee was born in 1931 in Burnley, Lancashire, into a working-class family who worked in the cotton mills. The family moved to Gainsborough, Lincolnshire when Snee was six. He was the first of his family to be educated beyond the age of thirteen. In 1948 he won an academic scholarship to the Slade School of Art, where he won scholarships for further tuition. Six of his early lithographs are held in the Slade collection. After college, he stayed on in Highgate, London, where his first works were exhibited and sold.

He moved back north in 1956, first to Lincolnshire, and then to Saddleworth in Lancashire. He taught art at Salford Technical College and then at Manchester College of Art.

In 1976, he moved back to Lincolnshire, and set up a studio at his family home in the village of Willingham-by-Stow, near Gainsborough. He commuted by train every week from Gainsborough via Sheffield to his teaching work in Manchester. It is clear from his notebooks that these train journeys were an important time of reflection for him. He recalled them later in the 'Railway Ovals', one of his most successful series of pictures.

In 1983, Snee left teaching and returned to full-time painting. Over the next twenty years, he produced his most accomplished work, a substantial body of abstract paintings, mostly in acrylic, that explores his experience of seeing. He also made woodcuts and detailed maquettes for sculptures. None of this work was exhibited in his lifetime. His last studio pictures were completed in 2003, and he continued to draw and sketch until 2013, the year that he died.

The full extent of his work was discovered after his death in 2013. As well as hundreds of paintings, drawings and maquettes he also left a photographic archive of his major pieces, a substantial collection of sketches and work-up drawings, and some seventy notebooks. This legacy was saved from destruction on the day of his funeral by the intervention of his daughter Jo.

== Work ==
Snee's early work is recognisable as kitchen sink realism. By the 1960s he had moved on to abstract art. He explored colour field, geometric abstraction and hard-edge painting. His mature work draws on the conventions of classical European painting, occupying a mid-ground between figuration and abstraction. Many pictures are recognisable as landscapes, head-and-shoulders portraits, still lifes, and pairs of human figures. His later paintings might be readable as any of these at the same time.

=== Exhibitions and prizes ===
Snee rarely exhibited his work. During his lifetime, his paintings were shown in Liverpool, Lancaster, Nottingham, Gainsborough, Manchester and London. His only solo show was at the Oldham Art Gallery in 1968.

In 1967 his painting 'Malabu Mink' was a cash prize-winner in the John Moores Painting Prize.

A series of 'pop-up' exhibitions were held in Sheffield following his death in 2013 and the discovery of his major work. A Foundation to support his legacy was launched at his first major retrospective, 'The Joy of Seeing', in 2018.

=== Retrospectives ===
- 2013 - "The Language of Abstraction", The Gage Gallery, KIAC, Sheffield.
- 2014 - "The Life of Painting", Eagle Works, Green Lane, Kelham Island, Sheffield.
- 2016 - "Natural Abstraction", Sheffield Winter Gardens.
- 2017-18 - "The Joy of Seeing", Crossley Gallery, Dean Clough, Halifax.
