= George Hamilton Constantine =

English painter

George Hamilton Constantine (1878–1967) was a British painter of landscapes with figures and seascapes.

Born in 1878 in Sheffield, he was the son of Francis Alfred Constantine, a saw maker. In the 1901 Census at age 24 he is living at his parents home, 113 Crookes Road, Ecclesal, Sheffield. In this census he is listed as an artist and sculpture. His uncle William Hattersley paid for his education at Sheffield School of Art. He then studied the restoration of pictures at the Courtauld Institute, and was involved in the conservation of painted ceilings at Chatsworth House in Derbyshire. Constantine was assistant to Sir William Rothenstein in the 1930s, and became Director of Graves Art Gallery in Sheffield from 1938 until the 1950s.

Constantine is best known for his watercolours of landscapes, seashore scenes and marine paintings, and in particular views of the Yorkshire and Lancashire coasts, and scenes of Cornwall. He is a popular artist now widely collected along with others of the Sheffield School. His paintings almost always have horses in, often the same pair, who lived on the family farm near Sheffield.

A member of the Sheffield Society of Artists, he exhibited at the Royal Academy, Carlisle Academy and Athenaeum, Dumfries Gallery, Abbot Hall in Kendal, Glasgow Institute of Fine Arts, Lake Artists’ Society, Walker Art Gallery, Manchester Art Gallery, Yorkshire Galleries and Lancashire Galleries including Lancaster.
