= DanimaL =

English rapper

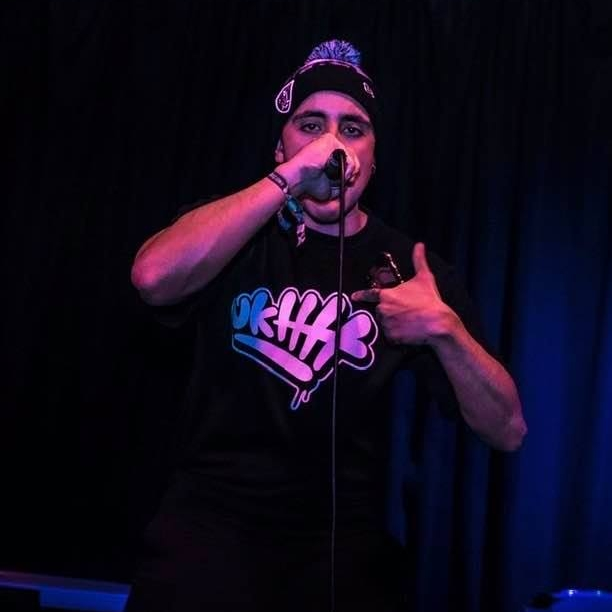
- DanimaL performing live

Background information
- Also known as: DanimaL
- Born: Daniel Williams-Hashemi; 26 November 1994 (age 31); Sheffield, England
- Genres: Hip hop
- Occupation: Musician
- Years active: 2017–present
- Website: www.danimalsheff.com

Daniel Williams-Hashemi (born 26 November 1994), better known by his stage name DanimaL is an English rapper from Sheffield, England, influenced by the boombap sound and conscious style hiphop. Described as a "high-viz clad mentalist" by UKHH, DanimaL has released one album, two EP's and numerous singles. DanimaL achieved notoriety after releasing his somewhat controversial single "Adderall". Consequently, DanimaL signed to Sheffield-based Message of a Nation Records. He has featured on various well-known British hip hop YouTube channels including, but not limited to, GlobalFaction, JDZMedia, Ukhh, P110 Media and Northside Media TV. In 2019, he made a radio appearance on Itch FM which ranked 29th in the global old-school hip hop chart. DanimaL is vocal about his struggles with mental health and the bullying he received growing up. In an interview with the Star newspaper he opens up about his ADHD diagnosis which he describes as a "superpower" using music as an escape route to fuel his passion for success.

== Artistry ==
DanimaL's style of rap is predominantly 'off-kilter' with a knack for using personal experiences and stories in a tongue-in-cheek format. His main influences in the UK scene come courtesy of Chester P, Skinnyman, Roots Manuva, Rodney P and Lowkey plus more of the pioneers of the UK hip hop sound and culture. In a Q & A by On: Yorkshire Magazine he mentions the importance of owning his accent and states "it's always funny hearing peoples’ reactions when seeing a bearded looking fella rapping in a heavy Yorkshire accent wearing a hi-vis".

== Discography ==
=== Albums ===
- Binbag Charisma (2024)

=== EPs ===
- Status Quo (2019)
- Tales of A Scumbag (2020)

=== Singles ===
- "Homeless" (2017)
- "Falling" (2018)
- "Growth" (2018)
- "Verocai" (2019)
- "Elevate" (2019)
- "Goat" (2019)
- "Adderall" (2019)
- "Righteous" (2019)
- "Lost" (2019)
- "Aristocrats" (2020)
- "ADHD" (2021)
- "0114" (2021)
- "Accolades" (2021)
- "Masta Yen" (2022)

=== Guest appearances ===
- Urban Linkz - Return Of The Underground Volume 1
- Urban Linkz - Return of The Underground Volume 2

=== Radio appearances ===
- Itch FM – DJ Captain Co. – HipHop Ahoy (2019)
- BBC Radio Sheffield – Toby Foster – Breakfast Show (2021)
