= Showroom Cinema, Sheffield =

Arthouse cinema in Sheffield, England

Coordinates: 53°22′39″N 1°27′54.1″W

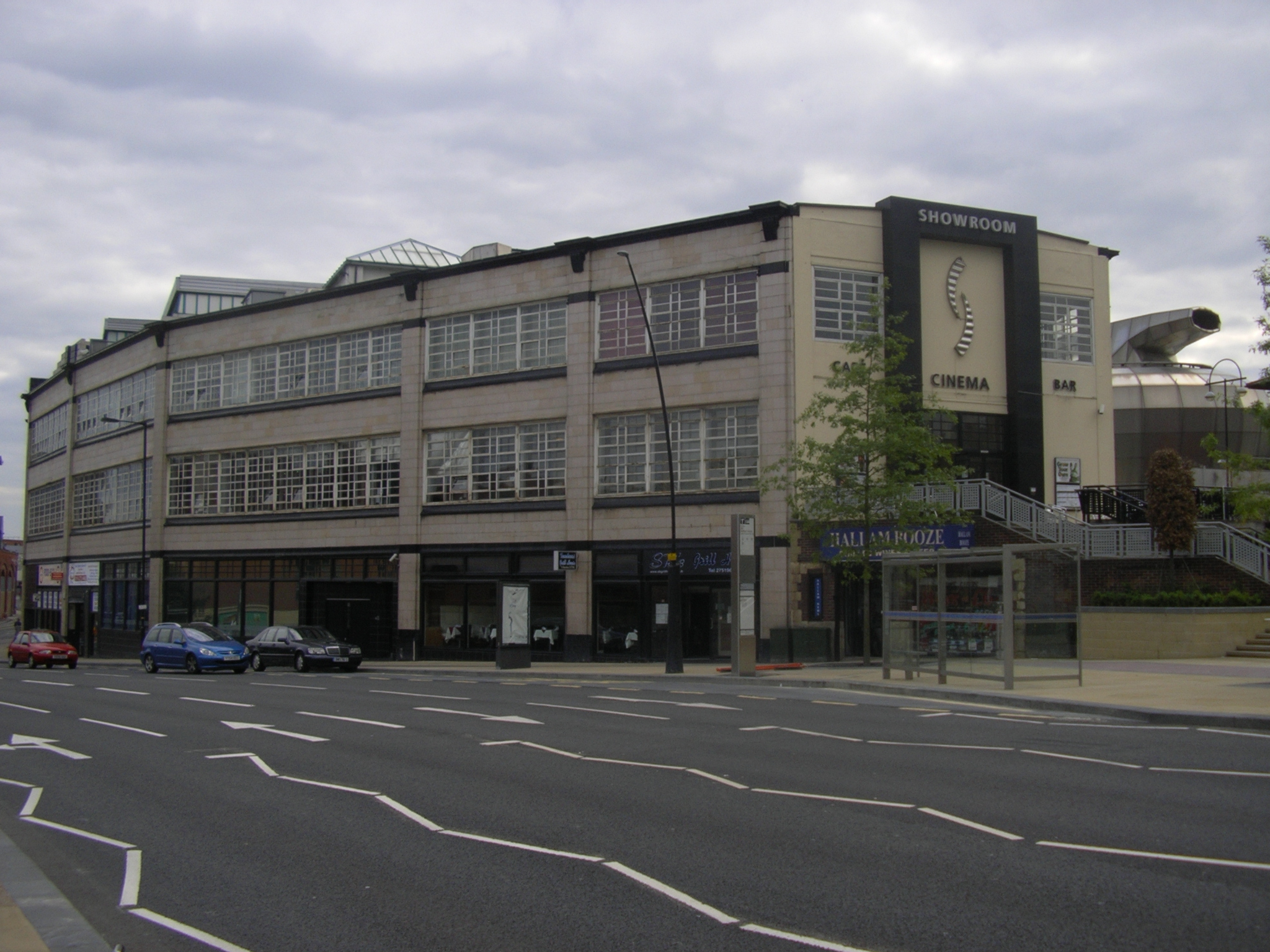
The Showroom/Workstation building.

The Showroom Cinema is an independent cinema, café bar and creative workspace contributing to the culture in Sheffield, England.

In 2002, the cinema was voted the favourite independent cinema of Guardian readers. In November 2007, Showroom was awarded the title Best Cultural Venue in Sheffield's Exposed Magazine Awards.

== Building ==
The Showroom Cinema is housed in a 1936 art deco building which was formerly the Kennings car dealership. It was first opened in 1993 with two screens; further phases of development have added another two screens, a bar and cafe and a meeting room, making it one of the attractions of Sheffield's Cultural Industries Quarter, in the south-east of the city centre.

Much of the remainder of the building is the Workstation, offices intended for use by business working in the cultural industries.

The conversion programme was completed in 1998 and saw an entrance to the cinema created from Sheaf Square; the Workstation retains the original entrance on Paternoster Row.

The building was used in the video for the Arctic Monkeys song "Leave Before the Lights Come On" in 2006.

In 2015 plans for a thorough refurbishment of the Showroom were announced, but the cinema must raise £250,000 to undertake the work. The venue's four screens are to be refurbished, including new seats and carpeting throughout, as well as updated foyers and toilets.

== Events ==
The Showroom is a venue for a programme called the BFI Film Academy which sharpens the creative skills of youths between 16 and 19 years of age. It gives the opportunity to qualify for a Silver Arts Award.

== Festivals and events ==
Lovebytes (1995)

Lovebytes Digital Art and Multimedia Festival. (1996)

Lovebytes Festival. (1998)

Sheffield Showcomotion Young People's Film Festival (1999–present)

Lovebytes International Festival of Digital Art. (2001)

Lovebytes International Festival of Digital Art. (2002)

Lovebytes International Festival of Digital Art. (2003)

Lovebytes International Festival of Digital Art. (2005)

Environments International Festival of Digital Art and Media, Lovebytes. (2006)

Digital Space at the Showroom Cinema (2006)

Digital Space at the Showroom Cinema (2007)

Digital Space at the Showroom Cinema (2008)

Lovebytes. Digital Art in Sheffield. (2008)

Celluloid Screams: Sheffield Horror Film Festival (2009)

Celluloid Screams: Sheffield Horror Film Festival (2010)

Celluloid Screams: Sheffield Horror Film Festival (2011)

Celluloid Screams: Sheffield Horror Film Festival (2012)

Celluloid Screams: Sheffield Horror Film Festival (2013)

Celluloid Screams: Sheffield Horror Film Festival (2014)

Celluloid Screams: Sheffield Horror Film Festival (2015)

Lovebytes- Digital Spring. (2012)

Off the shelf: festival of words (2013)

Sensoria festival of music & film (2013)

Sheffield doc/fest (2013)
