= Graves Art Gallery =

Museum in Sheffield, England

Coordinates: 53.380069°N 1.466739°W

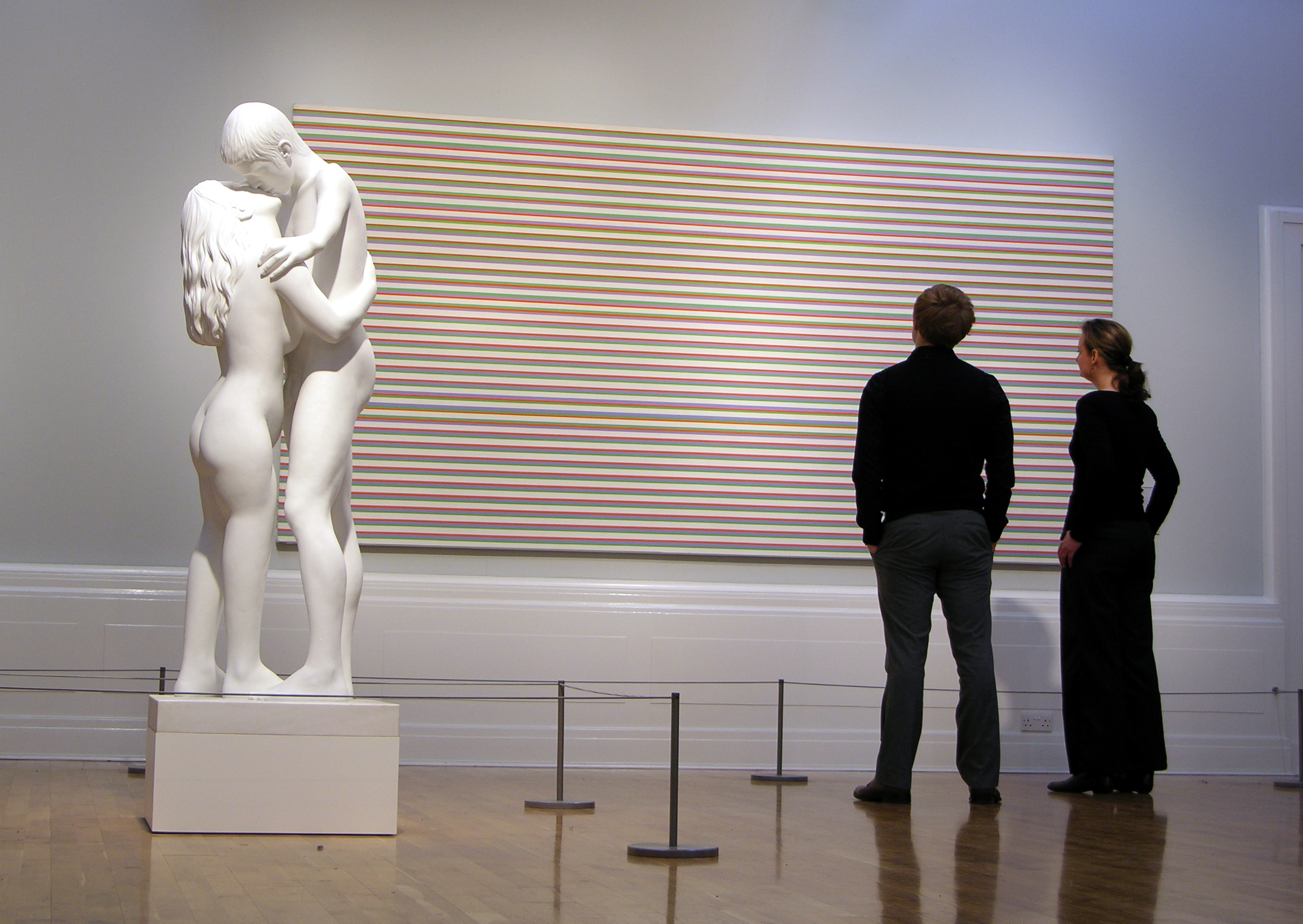
Graves Art Gallery, Sheffield (August 2009)

Graves Art Gallery is an art gallery in Sheffield, England. The gallery is located above the Central Library in Sheffield city centre. It houses permanent displays from the city’s historic and contemporary collection of British and European art along with a programme of temporary exhibitions.

The collection encapsulates the story of the development of art. The main trends and movements are traced through works by many artists, from J. M. W. Turner, Alfred Sisley and Sir Stanley Spencer, to Helen Chadwick, Marc Quinn and Bridget Riley. The gallery is managed by Museums Sheffield.

== History ==
The Graves Art Gallery was built with the support of businessman John George Graves, who made his fortune out of one of the country’s earliest mail order businesses. Graves also gifted his art collection of almost 700 paintings, much of which can still be seen today. Other benefactors include John Newton Mappin, of Mappin and Webb.

The Central Library and Graves Gallery (on its 3rd floor) was opened in July 1934 dedicated to ‘the service of knowledge and art’. It was a state of the art facility fitted with ‘heating…by invisible panel system’, ‘artificial ventilation’, ‘synchronised electric clocks’ and five lifts.

The gallery's first director was John Rothenstein, who became director of the Tate Gallery. The painter, George Hamilton Constantine followed from 1938 until the 1950s. Rothenstein and Constantine were key figures in broadening the 20th-century British collection that Graves had begun. The search for individual pieces of outstanding significance and quality characterised their vision, with works by Walter Sickert, Harold Gilman, Gwen John, C. R. W. Nevinson, Jacob Epstein, Stanley Spencer, William Roberts, Paul Nash, Christopher Wood, David Bomberg, L. S. Lowry, John Minton, Henry Moore, Keith Vaughan, Prunella Clough and Frank Auerbach purchased for the city.

During the late 1980s acquisitions all but ceased due to financial constraints. Museums Sheffield revived acquisitions in 1999 with the support of the Contemporary Art Society, the Heritage Lottery Fund, the National Art Collections Fund and private benefactors. In recent years renewed enthusiasm for and commitment to contemporary art has enabled the purchase of significant contemporary art works such as Marc Quinn’s Kiss and Sam Taylor-Wood’s Self-Portrait Suspended VII with support from J.G. Graves Charitable Trust, the Art Fund and the V&A Purchase Grant Fund.

In 2009 the gallery was refurbished and re-hung based around key themes. Significant recent temporary exhibitions include The Blk Art Group and Andy Warhol: Late Self-Portraits.

== Exhibitions ==
=== 2012 ===
11 April – 1 December 2012

Andy Warhol-Late Self-Portraits

=== 2011 ===
27 August 2011 – 24 March 2012

The Blk Art Group

31 March – 13 August 2011

The Triumph of Maximillian

=== 2010 ===
21 July 2010 – 19 March 2011

Paul Nash and Fay Godwin

17 April – 3 July 2010
'Writers of Influence: Shakespeare to J. K. Rowling' from the National Portrait Gallery Collection

=== 2009 ===
19 December 2009 – 27 March 2010
'Robert Mapplethorpe' – as part of ARTIST ROOMS on Tour with The Art Fund

21 November 2009 – 20 March 2010
'Comedians: 1940 to Now' – Photographs from the National Portrait Gallery Collection

16 September – 5 December 2009
'A Picture of Us?'

4 April – 7 November 2009
'Hogarth: Industry and Idleness'

4 April – 7 November 2009
'Graves Gallery 75th Anniversary'

20 May – 29 August 2009
'Moore, Hepworth, Nicholson: A Nest of Gentle Artists'

18 February – 2 May 2009
'A Picture of You?'

10 January – 21 March 2009
'Family Album'

=== 2008 ===
10 November 2008 – 14 March 2009
'Tate Visual Dialogues'

12 April 2008 – 31 January 2009
'The Grice Ivories'

6 March – 31 May 2008
'The Diary Room: Characters from the 17th Century'

19 January – 29 March 2008
'Hidden Narratives'

=== 2007 ===
21 September 2007 – 6 January 2008
'Where Are We?: Questions of Landscape'

7 July 2007 – 18 October 2008
'Breaking with Tradition'

16 June – 8 September 2007
'Pre-Raphaelite Drawings'

31 March – 16 June 2007
'We the Moderns'

10 March – 3 June 2007
'Lady Mary Wortley Montagu: an Extraordinary 18th Century Woman'

=== 2006 ===
1 December 2006 – 10 March 2007
'Angus McBean'

24 November 2006 – 25 February 2007
'Richard Long'

== Collection ==
Landscape with Cottages on the Dunes by Jan van Goyen, 1633

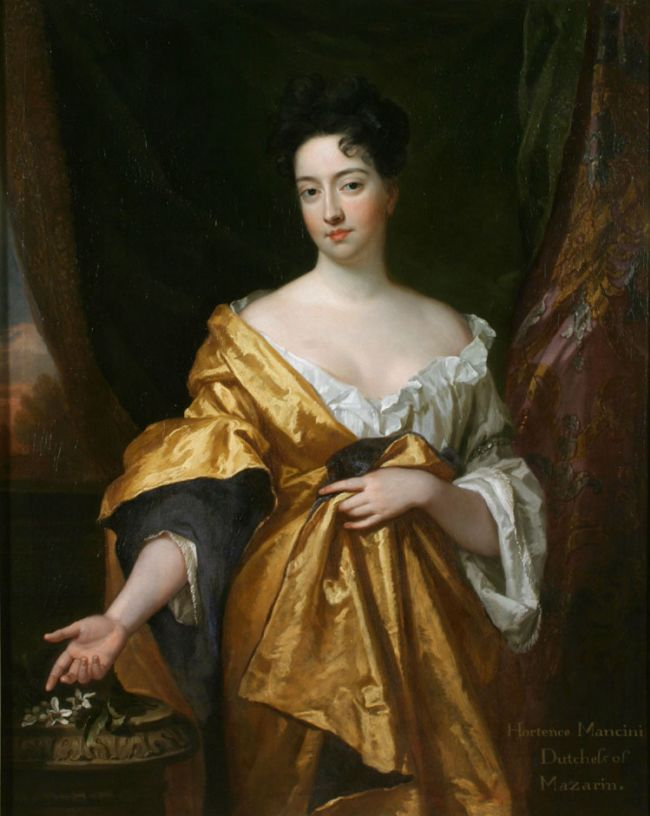
Portrait of Hortense Mancini by Godfrey Kneller, 1693

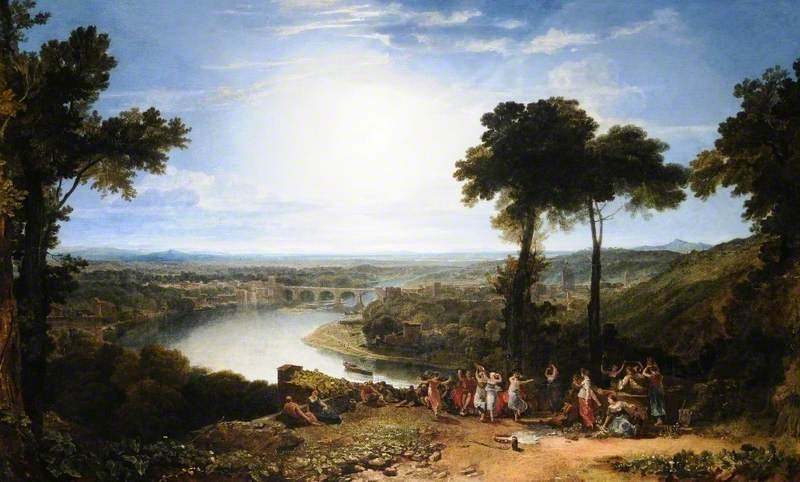
The Festival of the Opening of the Vintage at Mâcon by J.M.W. Turner, 1803

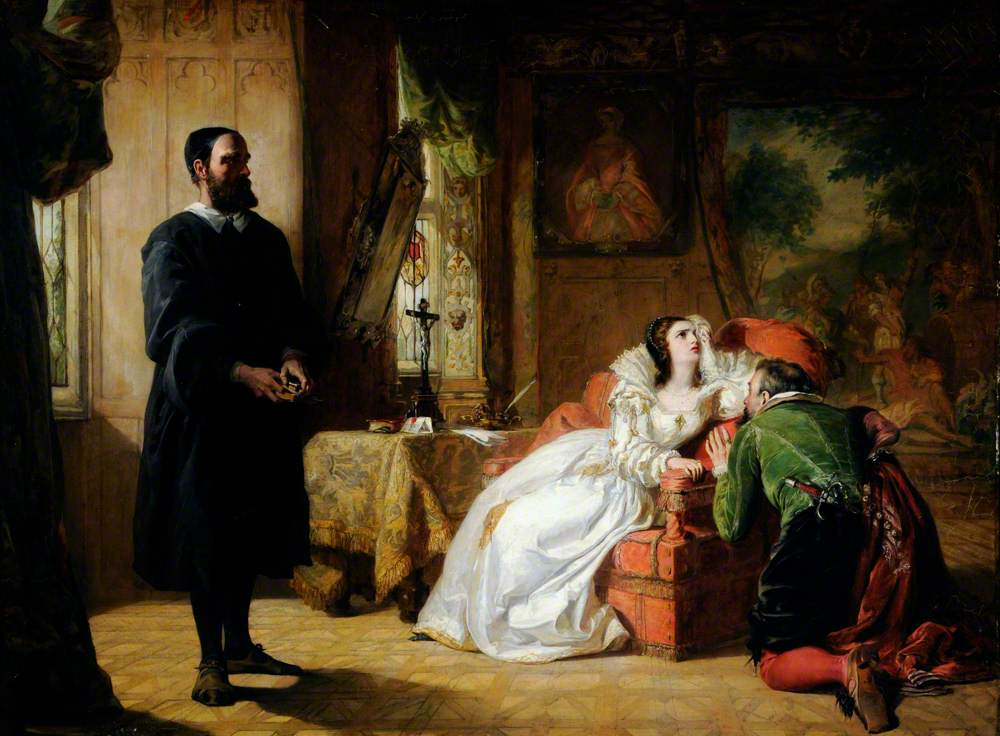
John Knox Reproving Mary, Queen of Scots by William Powell Frith, 1844

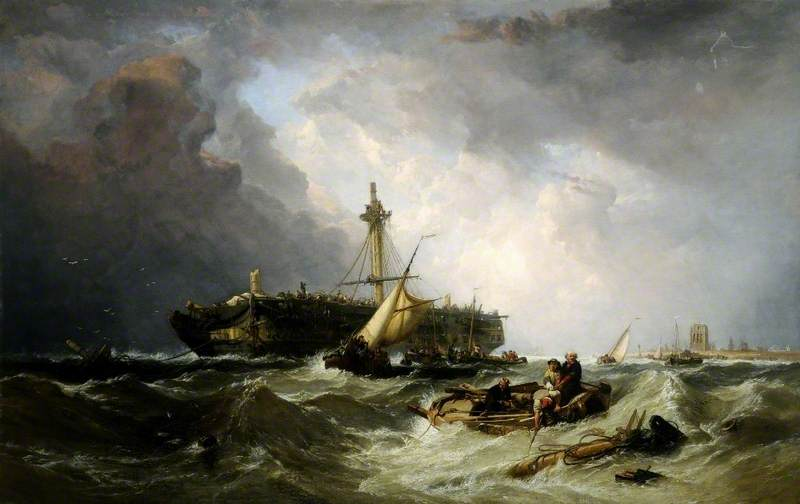
The Morning after the Wreck by Clarkson Stanfield, 1844

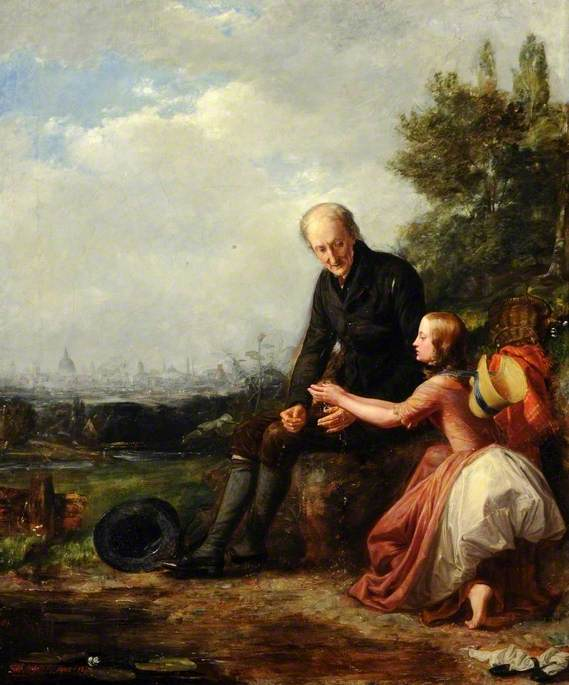
Little Nell and Her Grandfather by William Holman Hunt, 1845

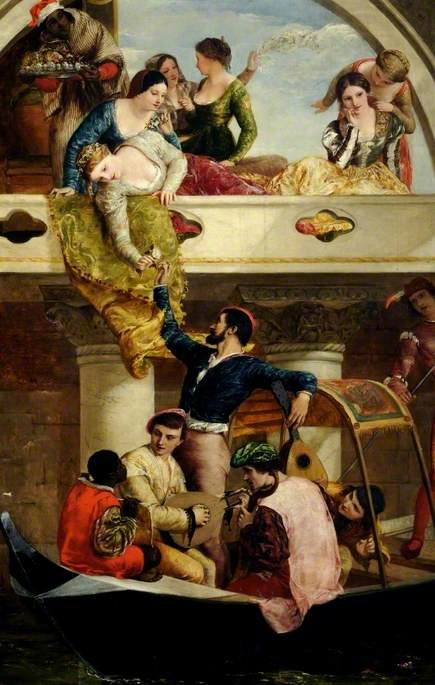
A Dream of Venice by James Clarke Hook, 1850

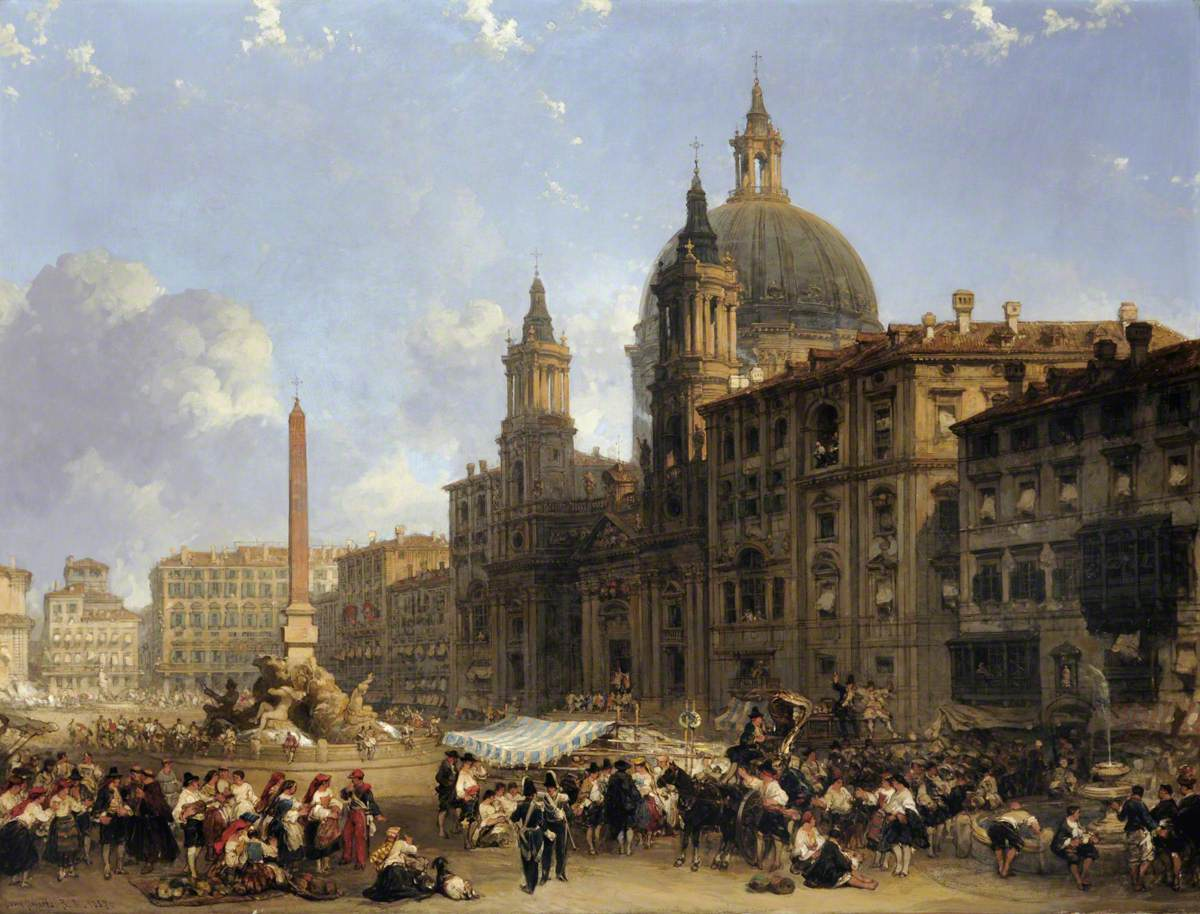
The Piazza Navona at Rome by David Roberts, 1857

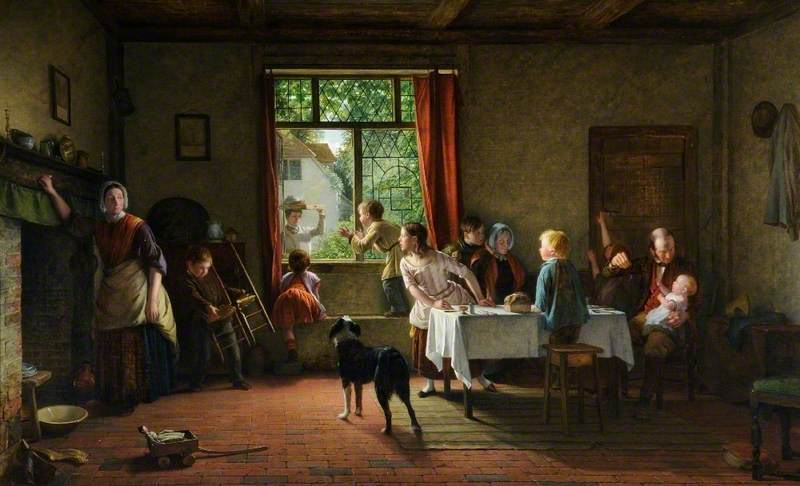
Roast Pig by Thomas Webster, 1862

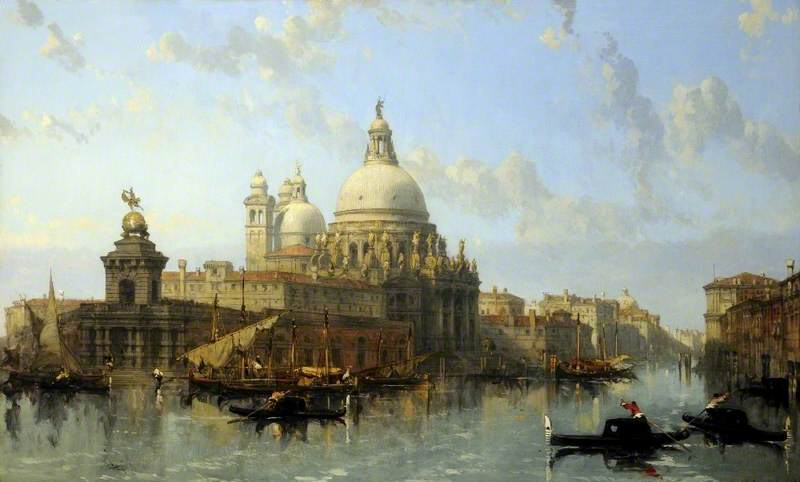
Church of Santa Maria della Salute, Venice by David Roberts, 1862

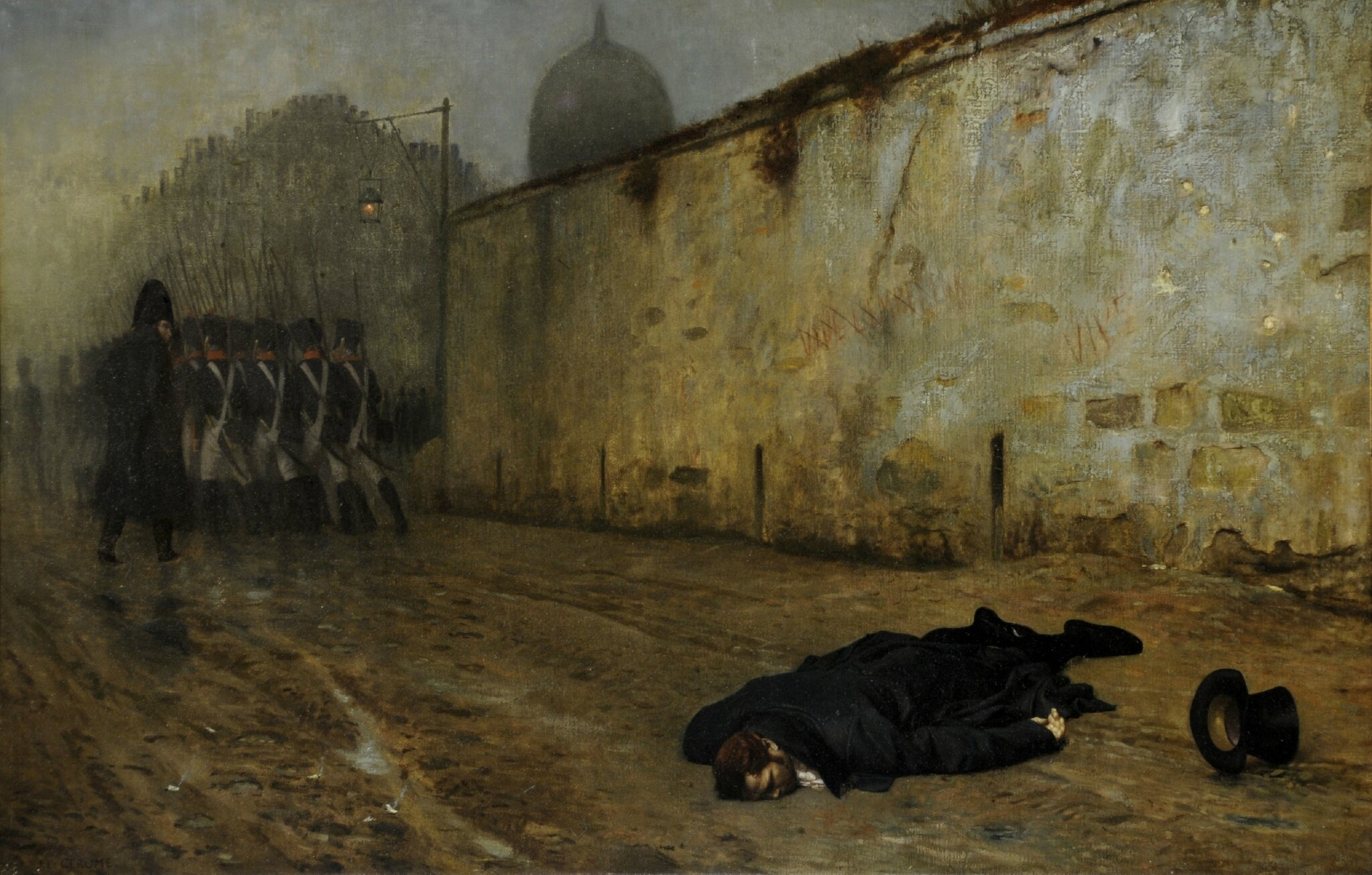
The Execution of Marshal Ney by Jean-Léon Gérôme, 1868

Charles I Leaving Westminster After His Death Sentence Had Been Passed by John Gilbert, 1872

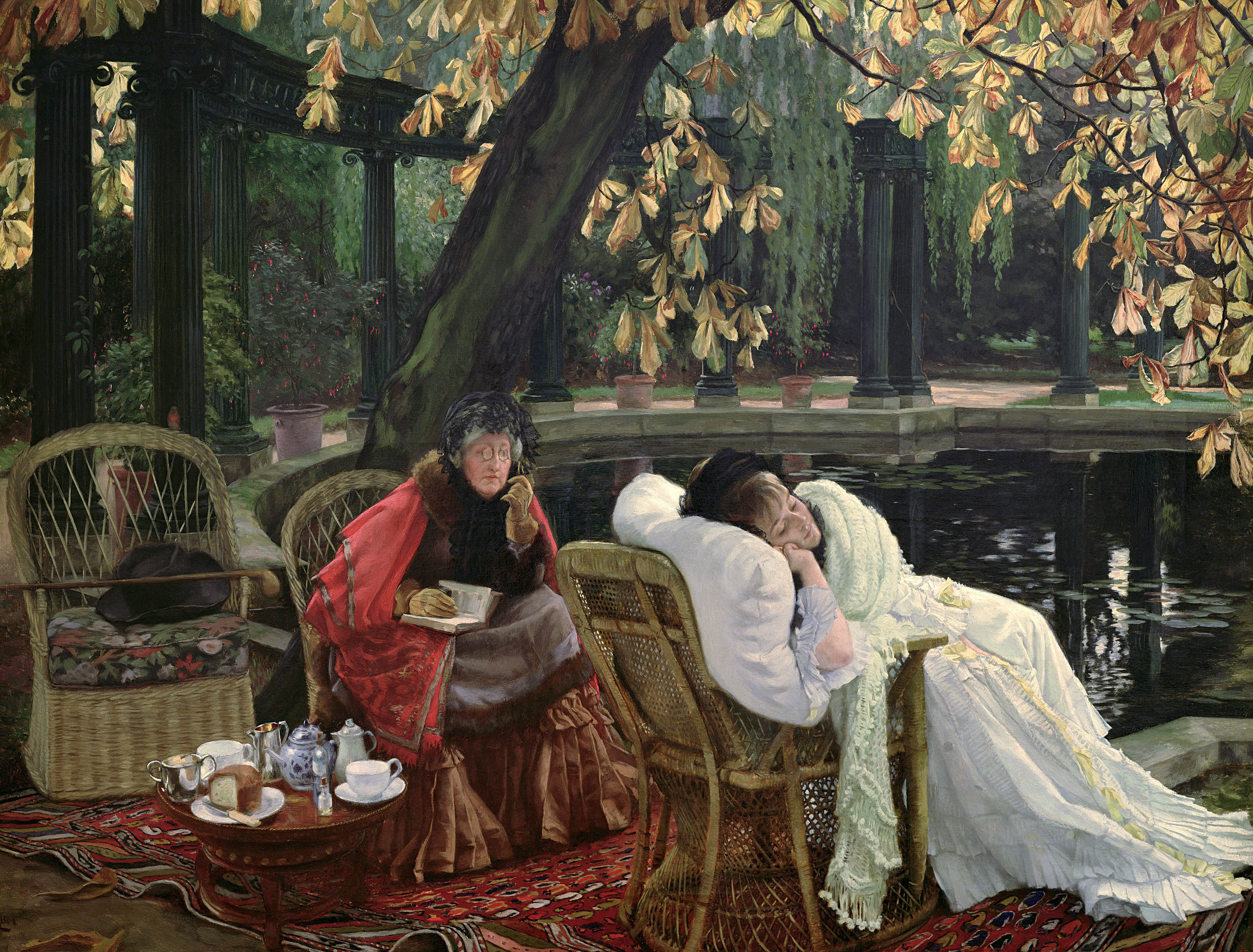
The Convalescent by James Tissot, 1876

Soldiers of King Albert at the Ready by Walter Sickert, 1914

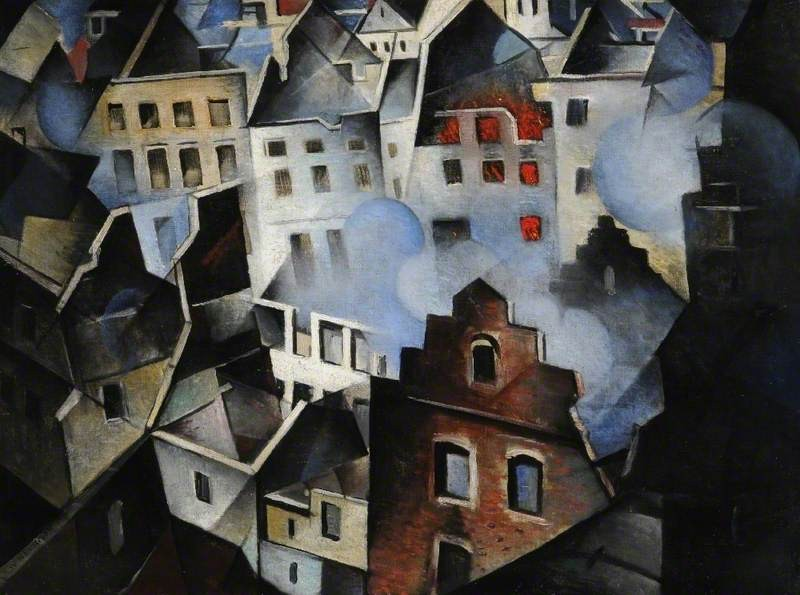
Ypres After the First Bombardment by C. R. W. Nevinson, 1916

Wren's Monument by Norman Garstin, 1921
