= St Paul's Tower =

Skyscraper in Sheffield, England

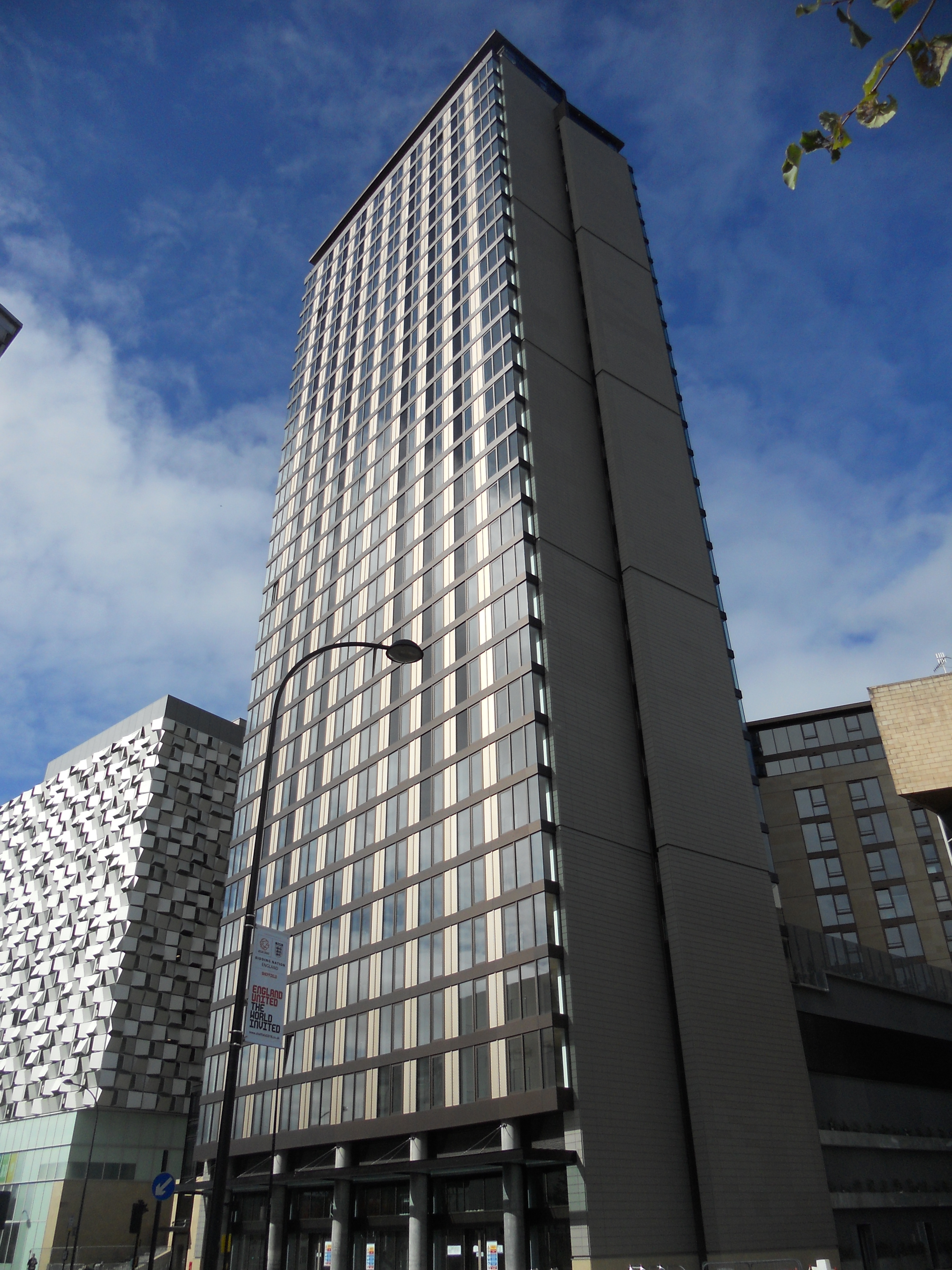
- St Paul's Tower
- Interactive map of the St Paul's Tower area

Record height
- Tallest in Sheffield since 2010^{[I]}
- Preceded by: Arts Tower

General information
- Status: Completed
- Type: Residential
- Location: St Paul's Place, Heart of the City, Sheffield, England
- Coordinates: 53.378947°N 1.468277°W
- Construction started: May 2006
- Completed: August 2010
- Opening: April 2011
- Cost: £40 million

Height
- Roof: 101 m (331 ft)
- Top floor: 101 m (331 ft)

Technical details
- Floor count: 32
- Lifts/elevators: 2

Design and construction
- Architects: Conran & Partners
- Developer: City Lofts Group

Other information
- Public transit access: B P Y TT; Castle Square; Arundel Gate Interchange

St Paul's Tower is a skyscraper located on Arundel Gate in Sheffield, South Yorkshire, England. Construction commenced in May 2006 and the building was topped out in August 2010, surpassing Sheffield University's Arts Tower as the tallest building in Sheffield at 101 metres (331 ft) tall. The city's first skyscraper, it was constructed as the centrepiece of the St Paul's Place project as part of the Heart of the City redevelopment of Sheffield city centre.

== History ==
The site of St Paul's Tower was occupied from 1740 by a chapel of ease of the nearby Sheffield Cathedral known as St Paul's Church, from which the skyscraper takes its name. Sheffield Town Hall was constructed next to the church in the 1890s, and the church was subsequently demolished in 1938 to make way for an area of gardens next to the Town Hall known originally as St Paul's Gardens.

In 1977, two brutalist extensions to the Town Hall, nicknamed The Egg Box and The Wedding Cake due to their designs, were constructed over the eastern section of St Paul's Gardens (the western remainder subsequently became the Peace Gardens). These buildings were occupied by the offices of Sheffield City Council; however, their contrasting design alongside the 1890s Renaissance Revival style Town Hall proved controversial throughout their existence.

In the early 2000s, two new office buildings, namely Derwent House and Howden House, were constructed a short distance to the south along Arundel Gate to house the relocated Sheffield City Council offices, and the 1970s Town Hall Extension was subsequently emptied and demolished in 2002. This left the site once again unoccupied. Following the completion of the Peace Gardens, Millennium Square and Winter Garden as part of the Heart of the City project, attention turned to the former Egg Box site, now named St Paul's Place.

== Design and development ==
Planning permission for the project was first granted in October 2005, with excavation work beginning in May 2006 and construction officially commencing in May 2007. The construction process of the development was originally due to be completed by late 2008.

The development includes a total of 316 one- and two-bedroom apartments located in the main skyscraper and an adjacent nine-storey mid-rise building named St Paul's View, linked by ground-floor retail. The project's design is conservatively modern, complementing the surrounding buildings such as the adjacent Grade I listed Town Hall and the modern Winter Garden. According to the official website for the project:

The light and slender tower will incorporate a variety of complementary external treatments with the use of extensive glazing, warm stone cladding, (not often seen in tall buildings), specially made terracotta rainscreen, copper cladding and bronzed aluminium louvre panels, creating a distinctive and memorable scheme.

— City Lofts, St. Paul's Building Design

== Construction ==
=== Administration of City Lofts Group ===
On 4 July 2008, it was announced that the company leading the project, City Lofts Group Plc, had gone into administration. The insolvency followed from a series of large financial losses, spiralling lending costs and falling property market values. Although construction at St Paul's Tower was not immediately affected, a number of completed developments were placed under the control of the administrators Ernst & Young.

=== Cladding controversy ===
On 3 October 2008, the BBC Look North news programme reported that the exterior cladding for the main tower had been significantly changed due to costs and was causing concern amongst Sheffield City Council planning officials and the wider public. Two well-known websites that had been following the construction of the tower reported that the council was calling a halt to any more cladding being placed on the building pending a decision as to whether the new design complied with the original plans. A revised set of design plans was drafted before being finally approved in December 2008. The new plans removed or modified certain features of the build, such as the removal of the spire and increased thickness of the window frames.

== Occupants ==
St Paul's Tower predominantly consists of apartments, containing a mixture of one and two bedrooms. However, provision for retail space was provided at the ground level of both the main skyscraper, fronting onto Arundel Gate, and the adjacent St Paul's View mid-rise, fronting onto Millennium Square; the two buildings are linked by ground-floor retail.

The entire ground-floor retail space of St Paul's Tower has been occupied by a Sainsbury's Local supermarket since July 2011. On the St Paul's View side of the building, the retail space is currently split between two restaurants: a Cosmo's and a Pizza Express.

Records
Preceded by Arts Tower; 78 m (256 ft)	Tallest building in Sheffield; 2010 – present	Succeeded by incumbent
