= Heart of the City, Sheffield =

Area in Sheffield, England

Coordinates: 53.3801°N 1.4701°W

The Heart of the City was a £130 million major re-development in Sheffield, England begun in 2004, and completed in 2016 and one of the 12 official quarters of Sheffield City Centre. As its name suggests the Heart of the City is located in the heart of the city centre.

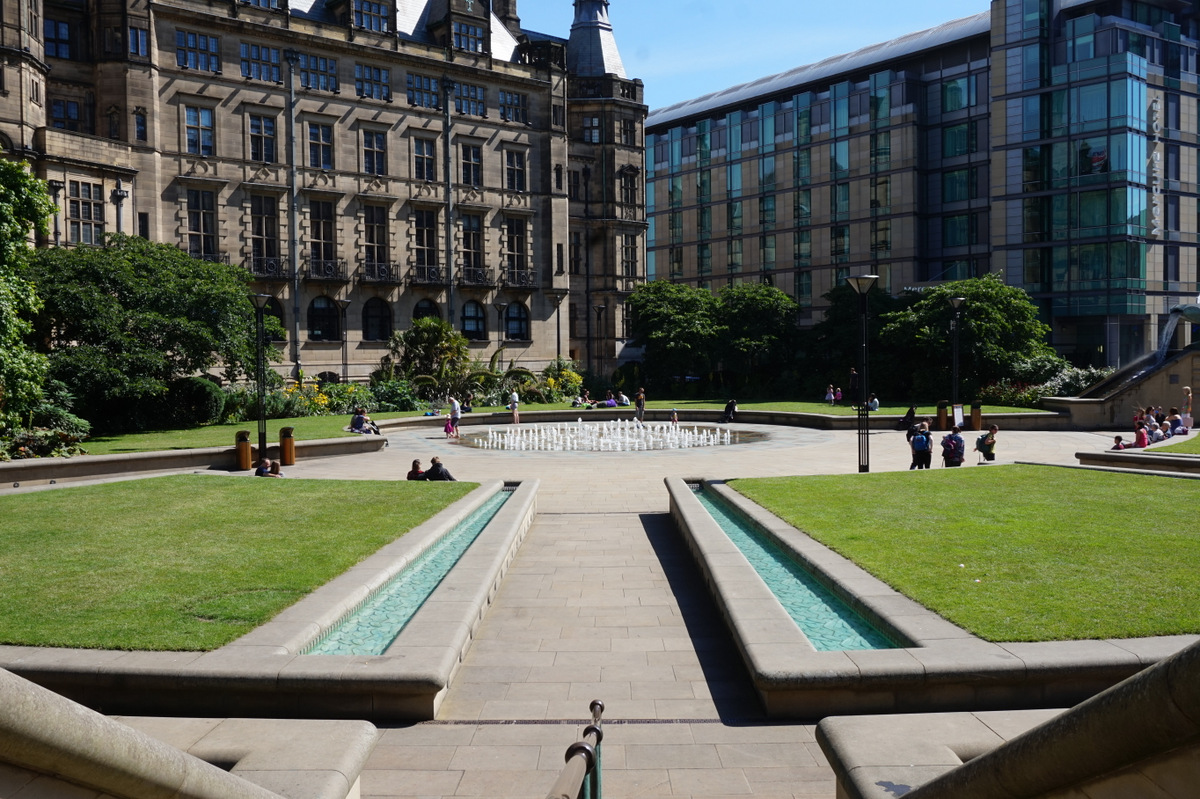
Looking across the Peace Gardens towards the St Pauls development. Town Hall is on the left

Heart of the City was mainly developed by Sheffield One, an Urban Regeneration Company set up in February 2000 to facilitate the redevelopment. The Heart of the City scheme has created many new public spaces, buildings, and skyscrapers. Subsequent review found that it satisfied many of the goals for a successful city laid out in the "Sheffield First" plan.

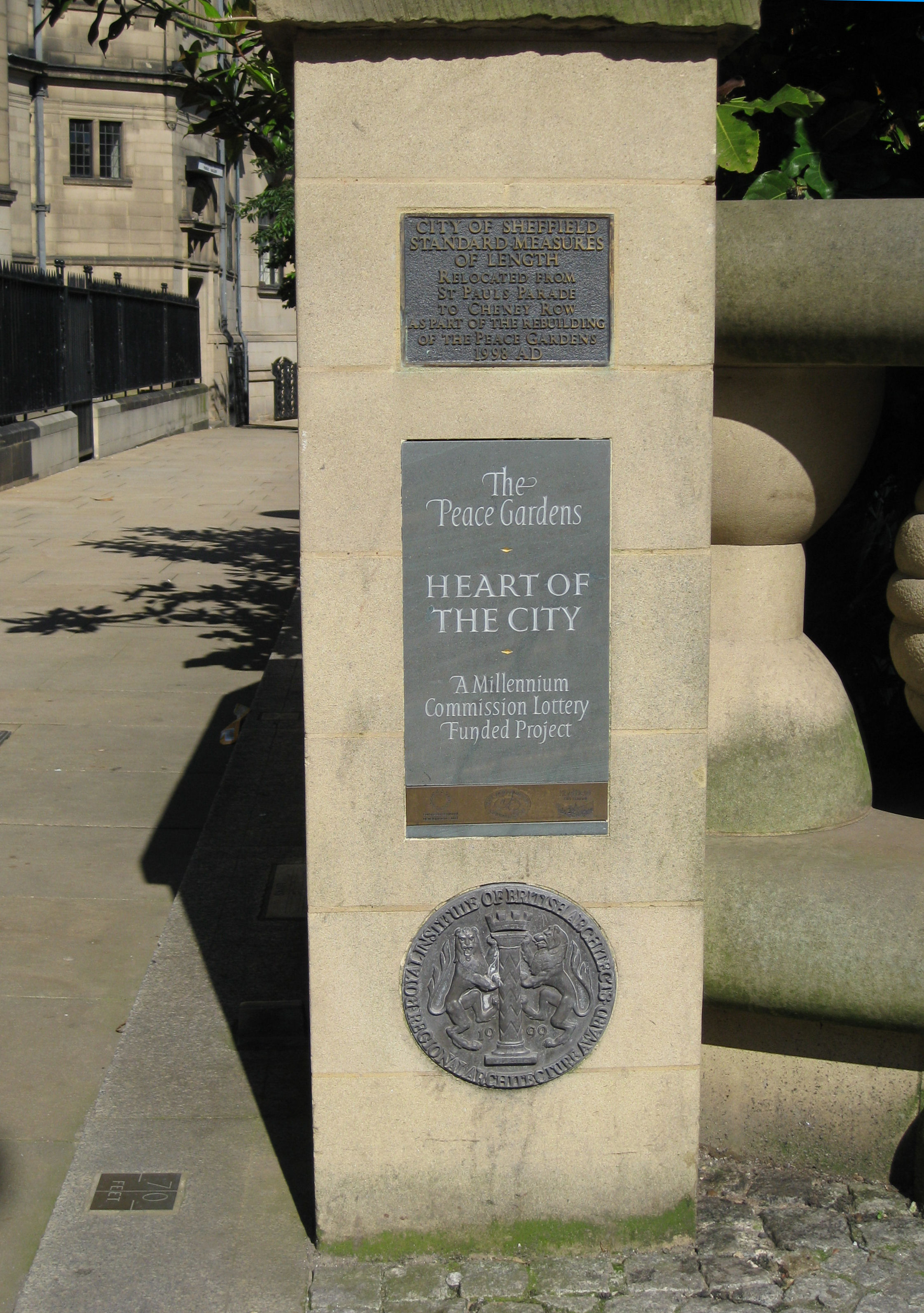
Plaque on Pinstone Street, by the Peace Gardens

== Structures part of the scheme ==
- Peace Gardens
- Sheffield Town Hall
- Tudor Square
- St Paul's Place
- Millennium Square
- Sheffield Winter Gardens
- Millennium Gallery
- St Paul's Tower
- Sheffield City Hall
- Barker's Pool
- Crucible Theatre
- Sheffield Central Library
- Lyceum Theatre
- Sheffield railway station
- Sheaf Square
- Velocity Tower
- Arundel Gate
