= Millennium Square, Sheffield =

Square in Sheffield, England

Coordinates: 53°22′46.4″N 1°28′7″W

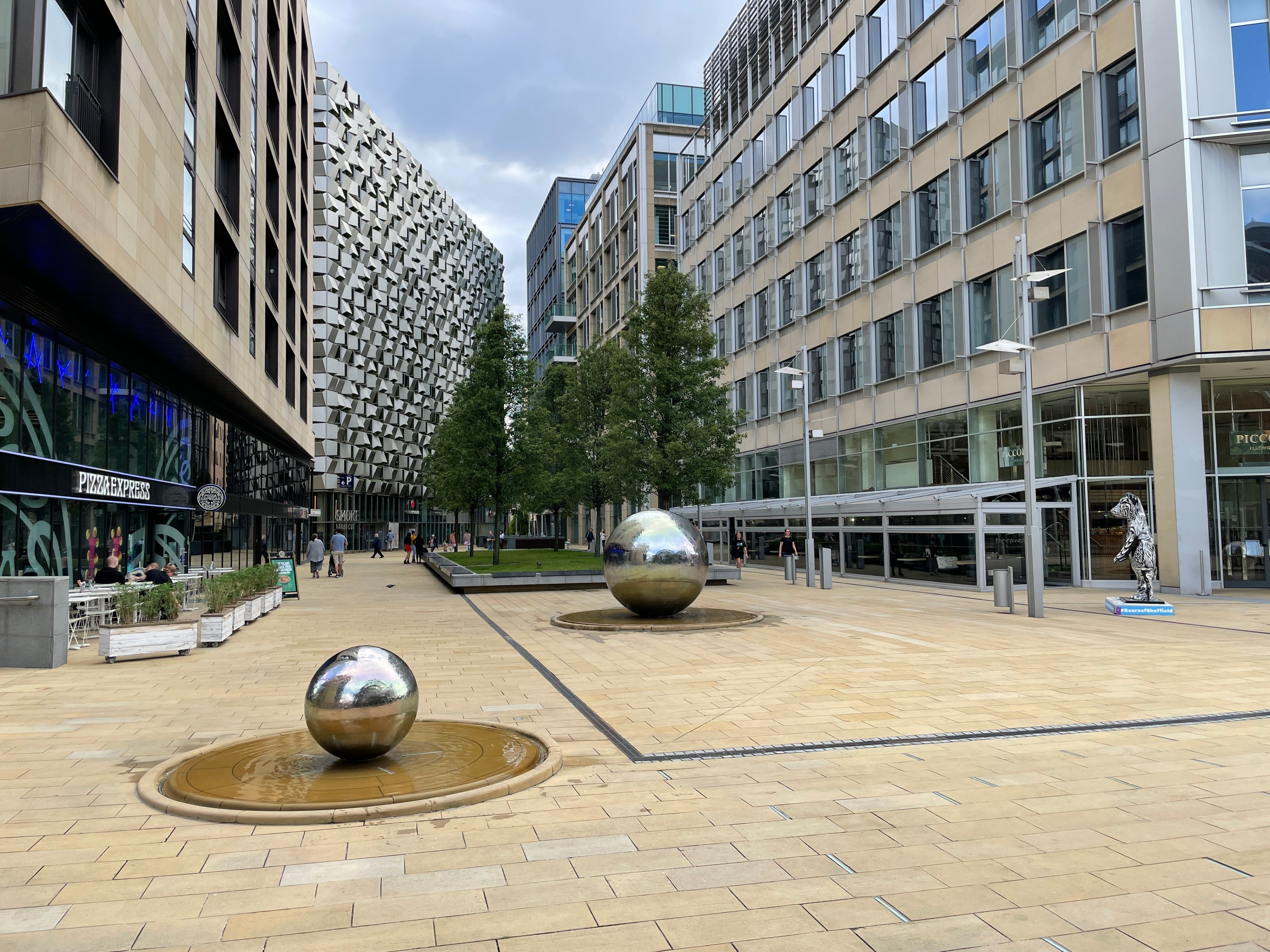
Millennium Square and St Paul’s Place

Millennium Square is a modern city square in Sheffield, England. It was created as part of the Heart of the City project that began in 1998 and has become a central feature in Sheffield's redeveloped city centre. It contains fountains in the shape of steel spheres, recalling Sheffield's past as a centre of the steel making industry, whilst linking with the fountains of the Peace Gardens, as well as Sheaf Square, Hallam Square and Barkers Pool. The square forms part of the 'Gold Route', designed by Sheffield City Council to guide visitors through the city centre from Sheffield Station to Devonshire Green.

Part of the space now part of the square was previously occupied by the Town Hall Extension. This building, constructed in the 1970s, was demolished in the early 2000s to make way for the wave of new developments in the Heart of the City project.

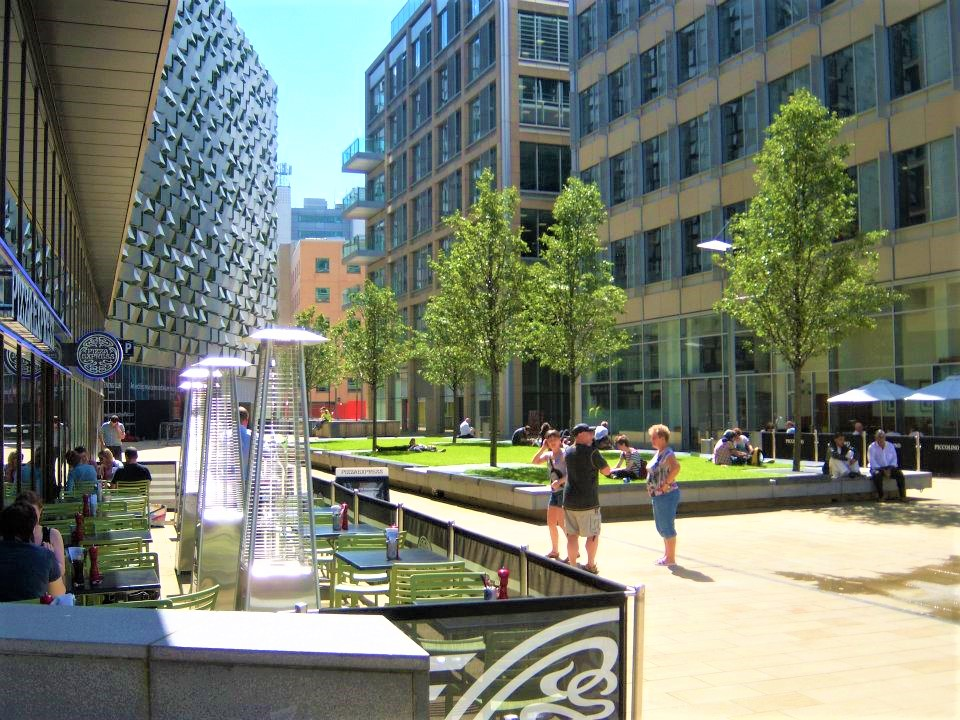
Millennium Square and St Paul's Place

The Square, which is in fact triangular, was designed by Architects Allies and Morrison and is surrounded by new developments on three sides and the redeveloped Peace Gardens on the remaining side. The surface of the square is made up of a suspended concrete slab covered with granite and sandstone paving. The surface is covered with hundreds of LED lights which are used to illuminate both square itself and the steel water features throughout it. The square is intended to form a link between the Winter and Peace Gardens and also the St Paul's Place development, which is home to Sheffield's tallest building. The square is surrounded in all sides by new or renovated structures, with the Peace Gardens and Town Hall on one side and a multitude of new buildings on the three remaining sides.

== Water features ==
The steel balls in the square, of which are there are nine, are water features that were subject of a design competition held in 2003. The winner, artist Colin Rose, designed the feature in order to symbolise the steel, craftsmanship, stonework and water which are symbolic of Sheffield's industrial heritage. The Piece is called ‘Rain’ and is designed to evoke the falling of rain drops upon the ground, with the small pools at the base of each steel ball creating the ripple effect.
