= Millennium Square =

Millennium Square may refer to:

- Millennium Square, Bristol
- Millennium Square, Leeds
- Millennium Square, Sheffield
