= Sheffield Winter Garden =

Greenhouse in Sheffield, South Yorkshire, England

Coordinates: 53.379849°N 1.467997°W

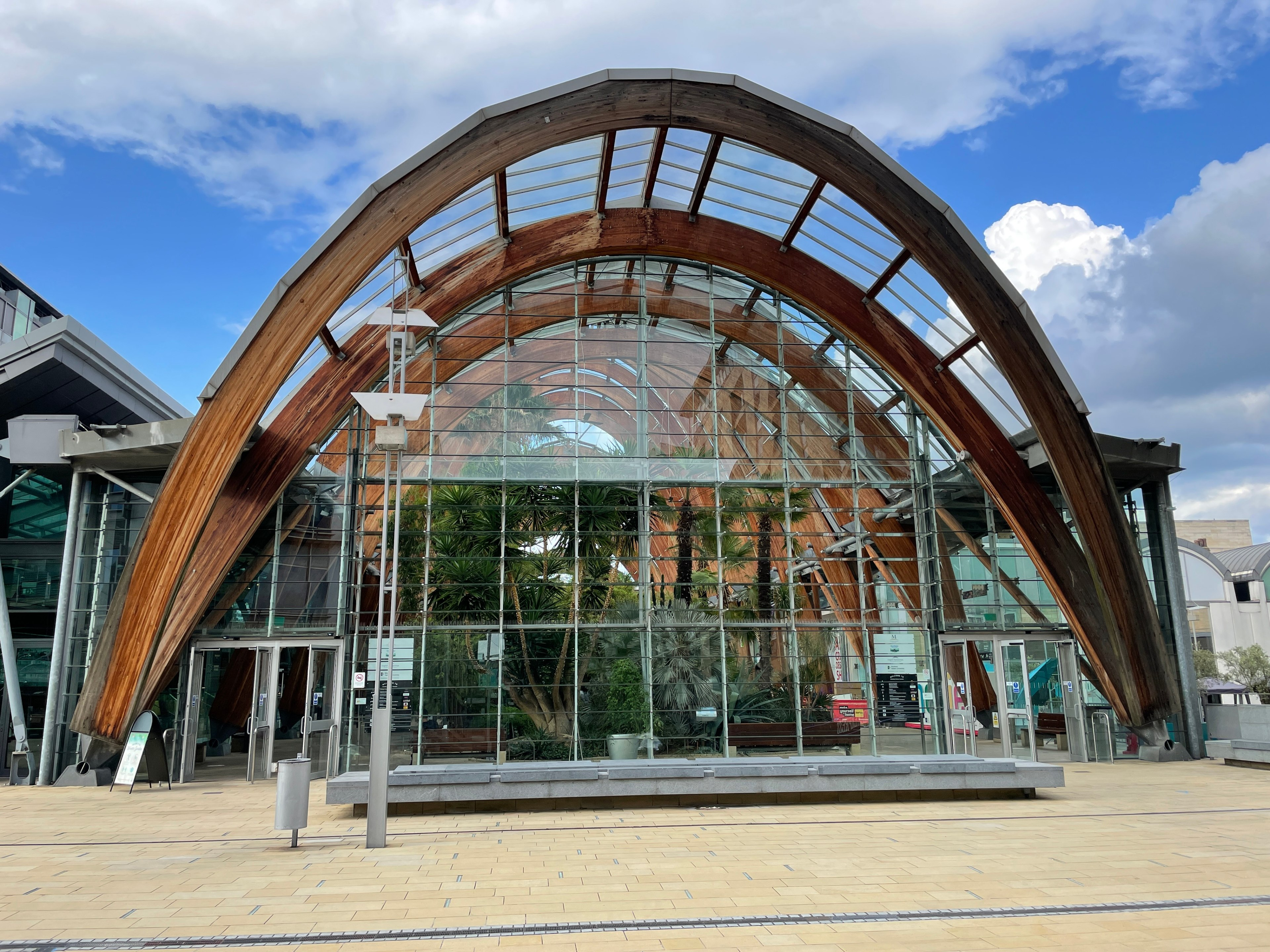
- The Winter Garden

General information
- Type: Greenhouse
- Location: Sheffield, England
- Completed: 2003

Technical details
- Structural system: Timber (glulam) arches

Design and construction
- Architect: Pringle Richards Sharratt Architects
- Structural engineer: Buro Happold
- Services engineer: Buro Happold
- Quantity surveyor: Sheffield City Council

Other information
- Public transit: B P Y TT; Castle Square; Arundel Gate

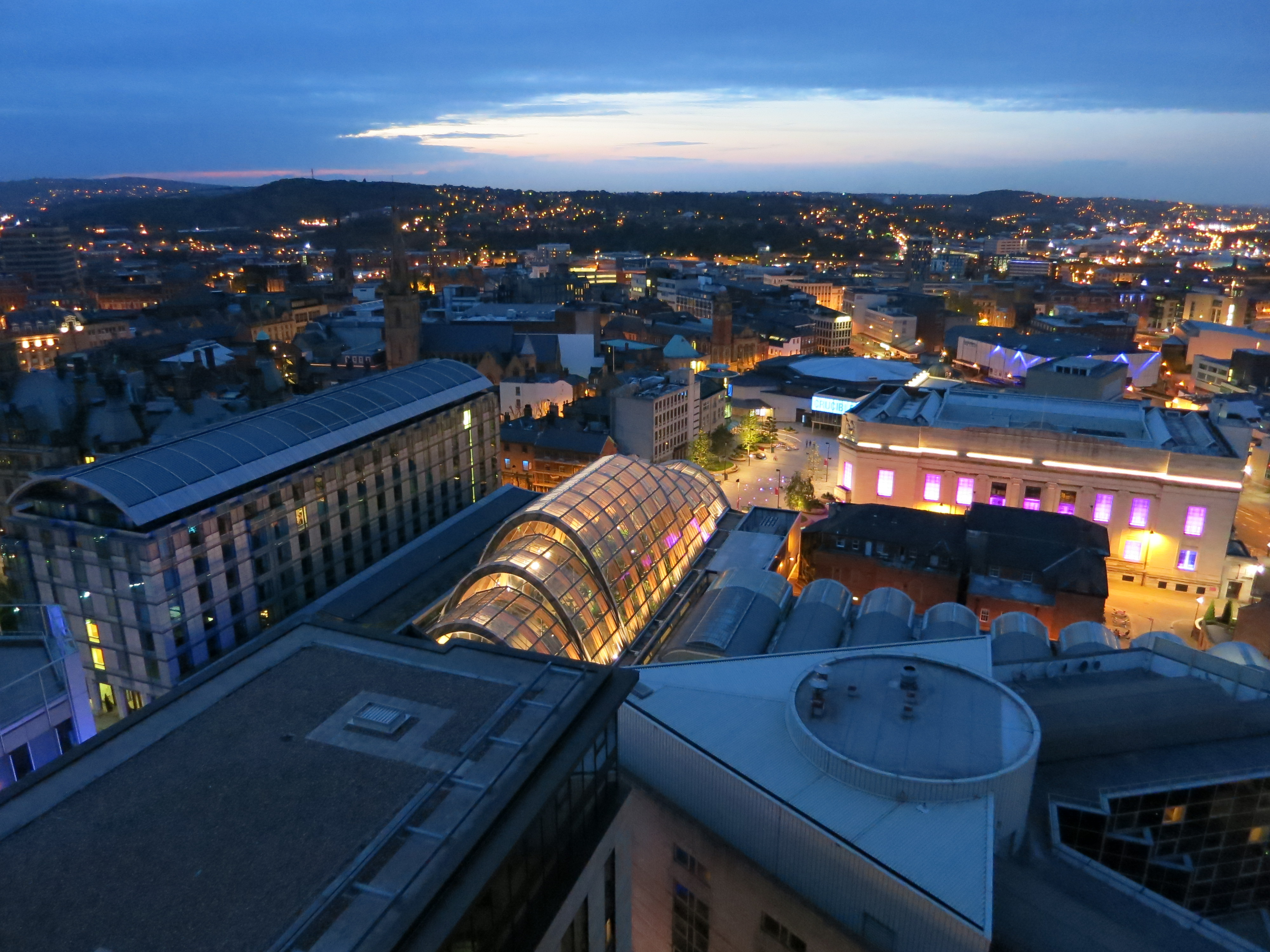
Sheffield skyline by night as viewed from St Paul's Tower. View includes Mercure St Pauls Hotel, Sheffield Winter Garden, The Lyceum Theatre, The Crucible Theatre

Sheffield Winter Garden is a large temperate glasshouse located in the city of Sheffield in South Yorkshire, England. It is one of the largest temperate glasshouses to be built in the UK during the last hundred years, and the largest urban glasshouse anywhere in Europe. It is home to more than 2,000 plants from all around the world. It was officially opened by Queen Elizabeth II on 22 May 2003.

== Design and construction ==
Part of the £120 million Heart of the City regeneration project that has created the Peace Gardens and the £15 million Millennium Galleries, the Winter Garden was designed by Pringle Richards Sharratt Architects and Buro Happold and is some 70 metres (77 yd) long and 21 metres (23 yd) high.

The Winter Garden interior

The building has background frost protection to a minimum of 4 degrees Celsius and it is one of the largest Glued Laminated Timber or "Glulam" buildings in the UK (Glulam is made by forming and gluing strips of timber into specific shapes). The wood used is Larch, a durable timber which will, over time, turn a light silvery grey colour. The larch, derived from sustainable forests, requires no preservatives or coatings. This reduces the use of solvents and also avoids the use of chemicals that could harm the plants.

The building has an intelligent Building Management System which controls fans and vents to make sure the plants are cooled in summer and kept warm in winter. The system will "learn" year by year.

The bedding plants are changed five times a year, to give a seasonal change, and all the plants are watered by hose or by watering can, as it is the only way to ensure that all the plants get the correct amount of water.

== Project team ==
- Clients: Sheffield City Council
- Architects: Pringle Richards Sharratt Architects
- Project Management: Sheffield City Council
- Quantity Surveyors: Sheffield City Council
- Structural & Services Engineers: Buro Happold
- Fire and Access Consultants: Buro Happold FEDRA
- Lighting Consultants: Bartenbach LichtLabor/ Lichttechnik Martin Klingler
- Winter Garden Landscape Consultant: Weddle Landscape Design
- Planning Supervisor: Sheffield City Council
- Management Contractor: Interserve Project Services Ltd
- Plant supply, planting and aftercare: Rentokil Tropical Plants Ltd

== Partners ==
The Winter Garden was funded by the Millennium Commission, Sheffield City Council and English Partnerships.

== Awards won ==
- RICS (Royal Institution of Chartered Surveyors) Pro Yorkshire Award for Design & Innovation
- RIBA (Royal Institute of British Architects) Award [with the Millennium Galleries].
- European Federation of Interior Landscaping Groups – three gold awards
- The Variety Club of Great Britain – Best Regeneration Award
- Royal Fine Art Commission 'Jeu D’esprit Building of the Year' Award
- British Guild of Travel Writers – Commendation
- Civic Trust Green Flag Award
- Also instrumental in Sheffield's win in the European entente florale award 2005
