= St Paul's Place =

Coordinates: 53.379°N 1.470°W

St Paul's Place is part of the Heart of the City project in Sheffield, South Yorkshire, England. It encompasses the new office blocks surrounding the Peace Gardens, the car park and is linked to the St. Pauls Tower.

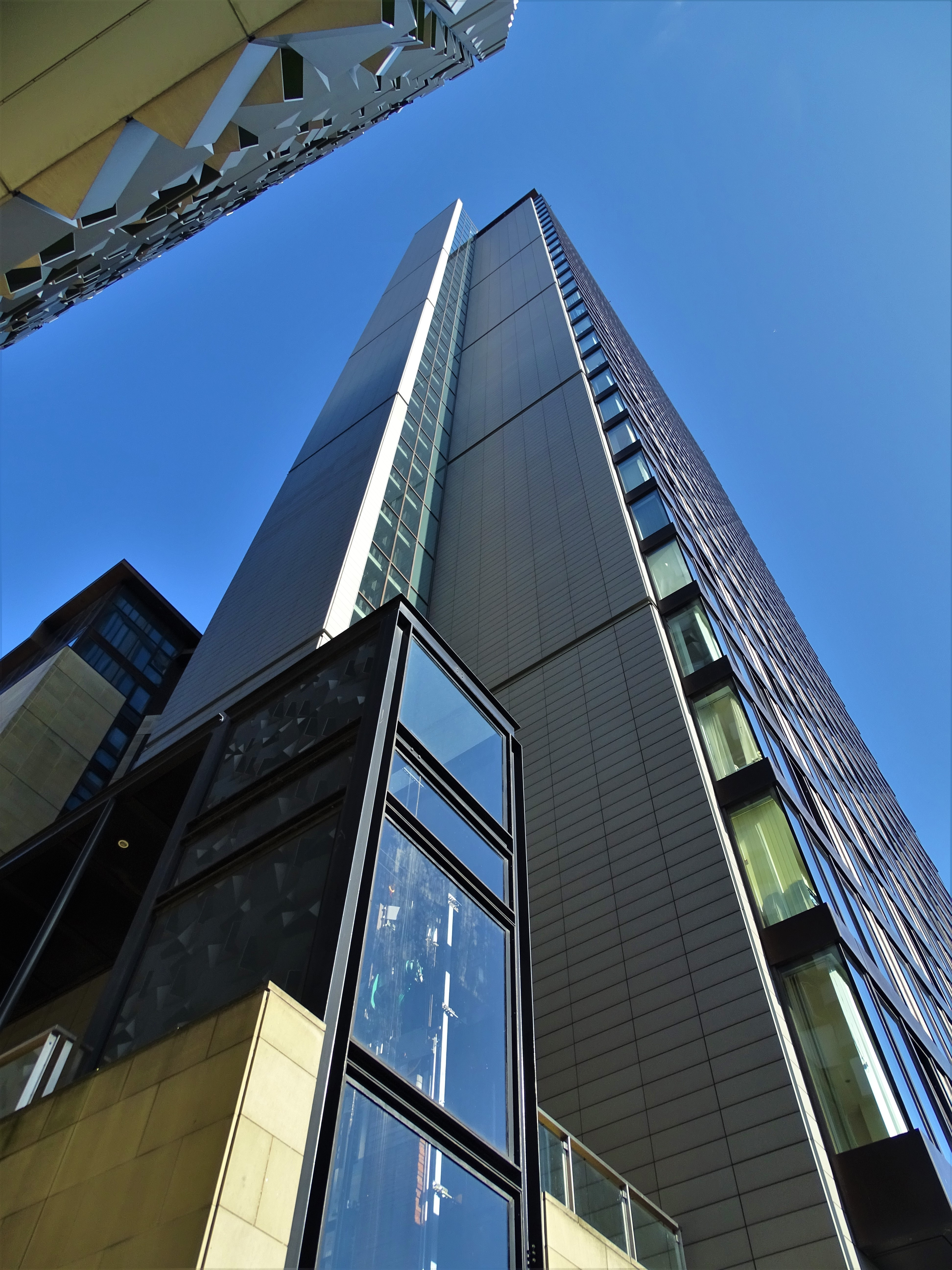
St Paul's Tower

According to the St Pauls Place official website, once complete the site will offer the following:

- 1 St Paul's Place occupied by law firm DLA Piper, PriceWaterhouseCoopers, Barclays and Royal Bank of Scotland.
- 2 St Paul's Place - completed 2009 and occupied by Department for Education and Department for Business, Innovation & Skills.
- 3 St Paul's Place - completed 2016 and occupied by Arup Group Limited, Handelsbanken, Building Design Partnership, Freeths, Times Educational Supplement and Ansys.
- 316 luxury apartments in a landmark tower to be created by the failed Citylofts. Completion August 2010.
- 135,000 sq. foot of restaurant, bars and retail space.
- 4 star Mercure Hotel with health & fitness centre and conferencing facilities.
- 520 space multi-storey car park.
- New public squares.

Following the redevelopment, Millennium Square, at the heart of St Paul's Place, has become the starting point for Armed Forces' Day parades. Also, now the office buildings have been completed, the Home Office has re-located its staff from 5 regional offices to this complex. Whilst the upper floors of the development are reserved for office space and apartments, the ground floor(s) are set aside for retail use. Currently, Caffe Nero, Piccolino, Bella Italia, Pizza Express, Smoke BBQ and Cosmo occupy space within the development. Further units remain to be let

On 26 August 2010 the St Paul's Tower was completed and declared habitable.

== History ==
Prior to redevelopment in the mid-2000s the site had been home to several different buildings. Most prominent amongst them was the Town Hall extension, erected in the 1970s and disparagingly known as the 'egg-box' because of its design. At the time of its construction, doubts were being cast on the durability of concrete buildings and as a result the Town Hall Extension was built with a projected lifespan of 500 years. Consequently, its demolition proved slow and complicated. Also sited there was the Sheffield registry office known as 'the wedding cake', also for design reasons.
