= Arts Tower =

Building in Sheffield, England

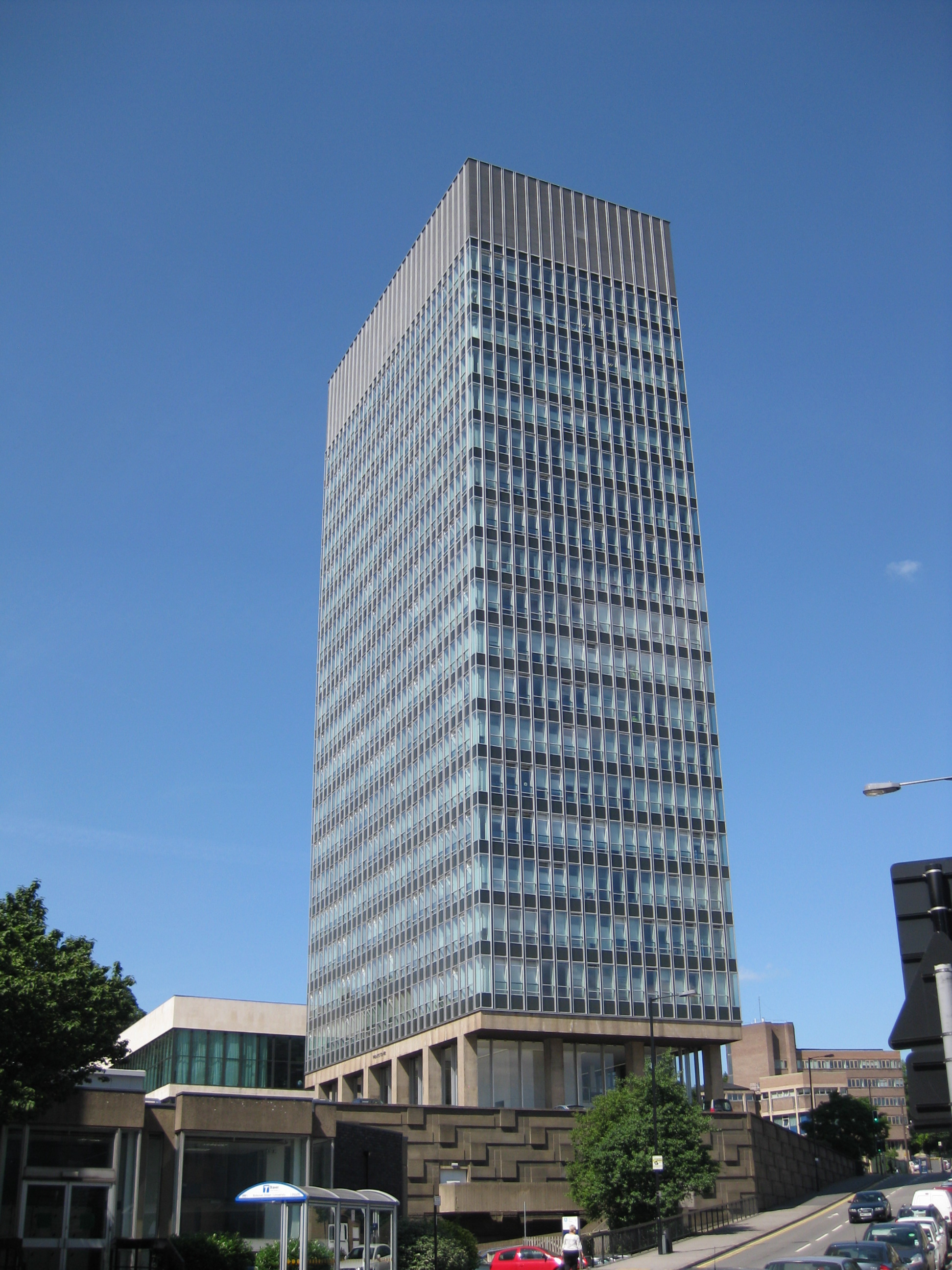
- Arts Tower in 2013
- Interactive map of the Arts Tower area

Record height
- Tallest in Sheffield from 1965 to 2010^{[I]}
- Preceded by: Sheffield Town Hall
- Surpassed by: St Pauls Tower

General information
- Type: University
- Location: University of Sheffield, Sheffield, United Kingdom
- Coordinates: 53.382738°N 1.487289°W
- Construction started: 1961
- Completed: 1965
- Opening: 1965
- Renovated: 2009-11
- Owner: University of Sheffield

Height
- Roof: 78 m (256 ft)
- Top floor: 78 m (256 ft)

Technical details
- Floor count: 20

Other information
- Public transit access: B Y University of Sheffield

The Arts Tower is a building at 12 Bolsover Street in Sheffield, England, belonging to the University of Sheffield and which opened in 1965. A spokesperson for English Heritage described it as "the most elegant university tower block in Britain of its period". At 78 m (256 ft) tall, it is the second-tallest building in the city, after the 101 m (331 ft) St Paul's Tower on Arundel Gate, which was topped out in 2009.

== Design and construction ==
Designed by architects Gollins, Melvin, Ward & Partners (GMW), construction of the tower started in 1961 and lasted four years. The tower was built by Mitchell Construction, a British civil engineering firm. Photographs from their topping out ceremony in October 1964 help to document a different era in UK working conditions.

Contrary to popular belief, there is no documentary evidence to suggest that the design was directly inspired by the similar, but much larger, Seagram Building in New York City, or for the theory linking it to the CIS Tower and New Century House in Manchester, England - although the similarity of aesthetics between the four buildings is undeniable. When asked about the possible inspiration of Mies van der Rohe's buildings in the United States, GMW project architect Robert Smith explained instead that the form of the building came from the surrounding context.

Entry to the building was originally made by a wide 'bridge' between fountains over a shallow pool area in front of the building. This pool was eventually drained and covered over when it was found that strong down drafts of wind hitting the building on gusty days caused the fountain to soak people entering and exiting the building.

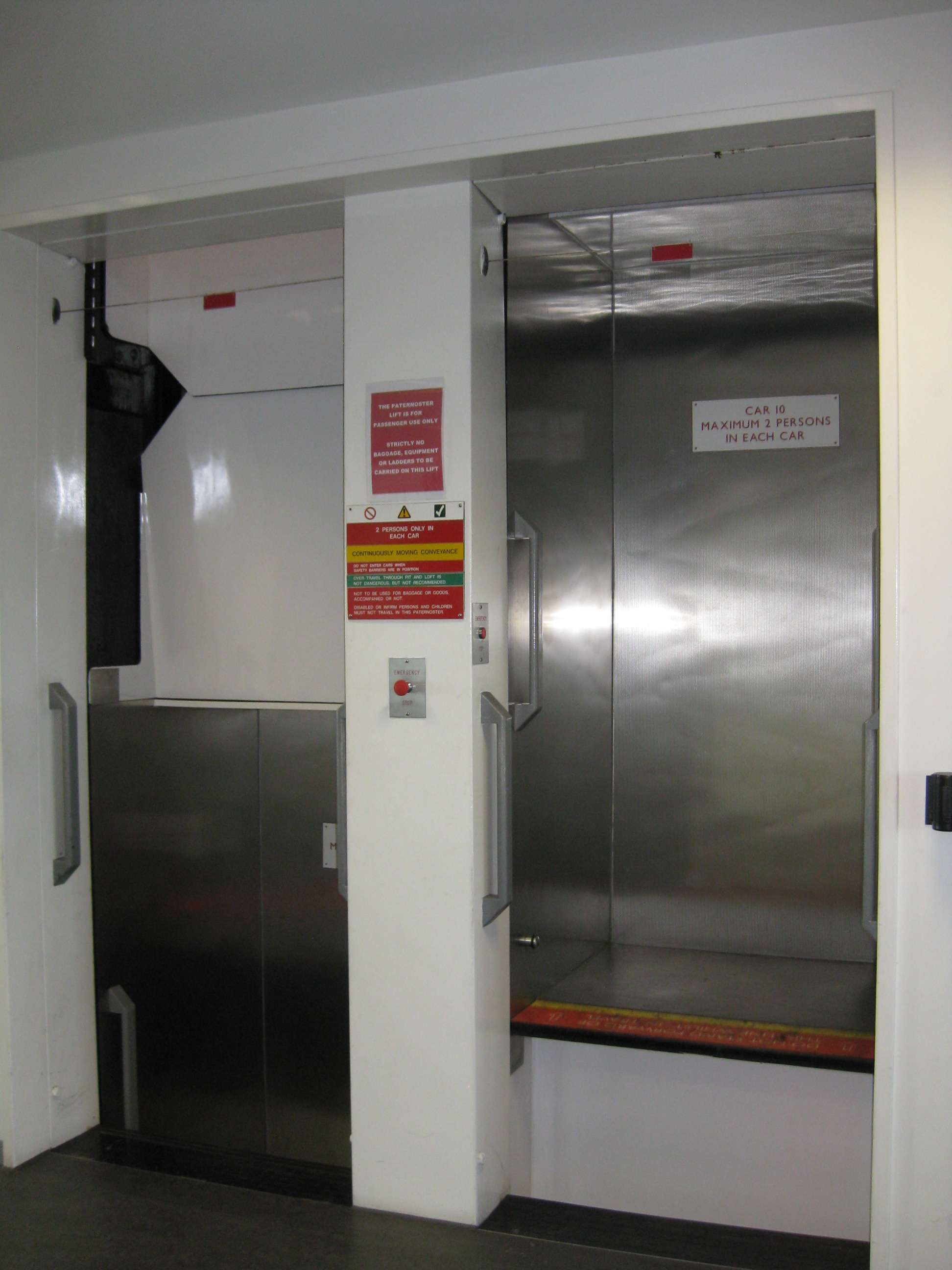
Paternoster lift in Sheffield University Arts Tower

Circulation is through two ordinary lifts and a paternoster lift which, at 38 cars, is the largest of the few surviving in the United Kingdom.

A bridge at the mezzanine level links the tower to Western Bank Library. This building was also designed by Gollins, Melvin, Ward & Partners—the two buildings are intended to be viewed together. The Arts Tower and Library are Grade II* listed buildings.

The buildings can be visited during office hours, although visitors may have to sign a register and show identification.

== Original accommodation ==
The building was officially opened by Queen Elizabeth, The Queen Mother, in June 1966; it has 20 storeys and a mezzanine level above ground. These housed the Departments of Landscape, Modern Languages, Philosophy, Biblical Studies, and Architecture, as well as the library administration, before the building's refurbishment. As its name suggests, the building originally housed all 18 of the university's arts departments, which had far fewer students in the 1960s. Noticeboards for long rehoused departments such as History and Social Science survive in the basement foyer area. There are also two floors below ground level that house nine lecture theatres. The building contains a café in the basement. It has a student computer room on the 10th floor, and a self-service language teaching centre on the second.

== Refurbishment ==
In December 2007, the university announced plans for a major refurbishment of the Arts Tower. The refurbishment saw a major re-organisation of the building's interior, as well as a new façade, and coincided with the move of the modern languages departments to the Jessop West building, on the former Jessop Hospital site. The building was vacated in April 2009, with refurbishment taking approximately two years to complete. The work was finished in time for the beginning of the 2011–12 academic year; the building is still used for teaching, with the top nine floors allocated to the university's School of Architecture and Landscape.

Records
Preceded by Leeds Town Hall; 69 m (226 ft)	Tallest building in Yorkshire; 1965 – 1973	Succeeded by West Riding House; 80 m (260 ft)
Preceded by Sheffield Town Hall; 61 m (200 ft)	Tallest building in Sheffield; 1965 – 2010	Succeeded by St Paul's Tower; 101 m (331 ft)
