= Millennium Gallery =

Art gallery and museum in Sheffield, England

Coordinates: 53.379572°N 1.467286°W

The Millennium Gallery from Arundel Gate

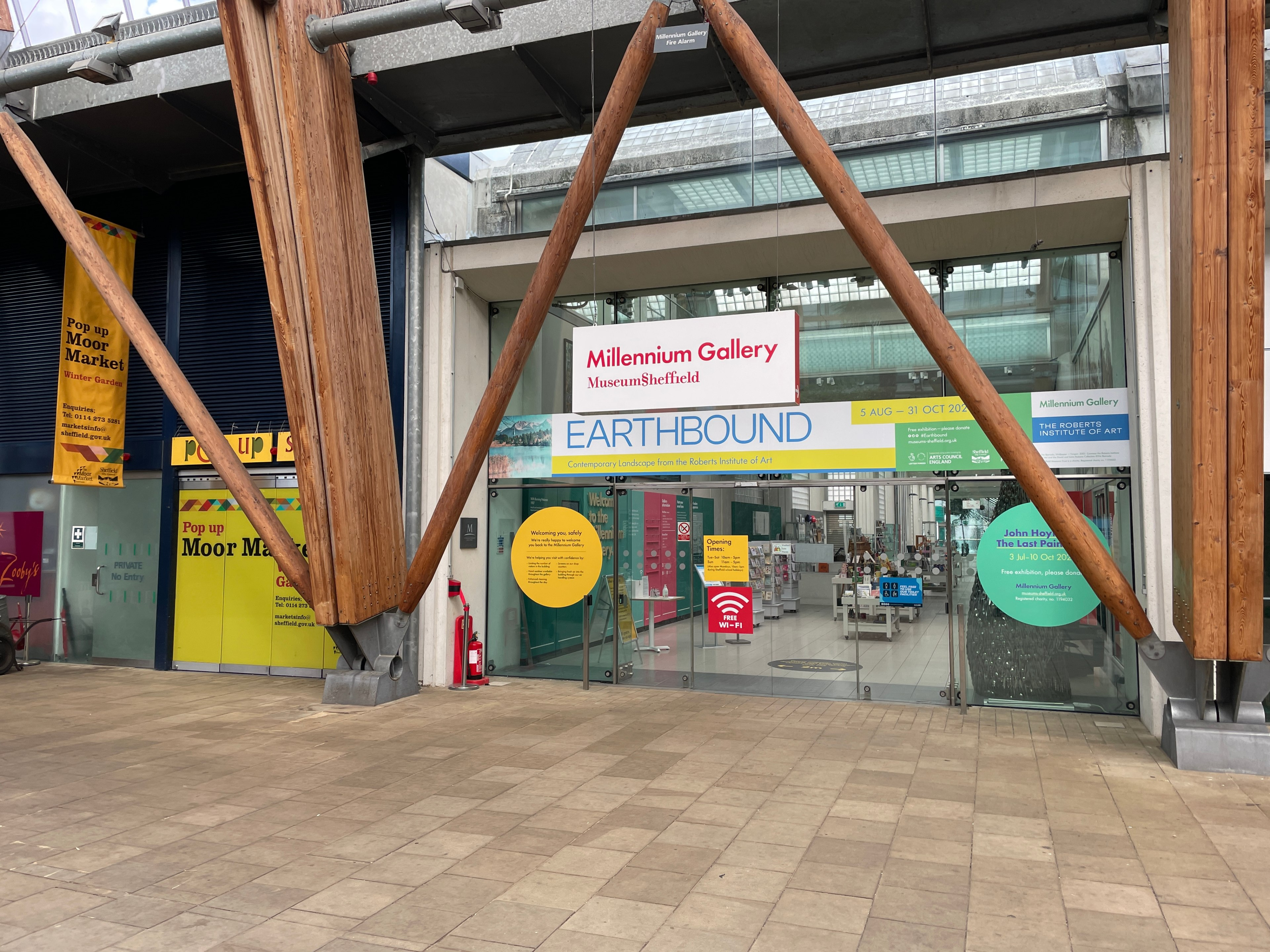
Entrance from the Winter Garden

The Millennium Gallery is an art gallery and museum in the centre of Sheffield, England. Opened in April 2001 as part of Sheffield's Heart of the City project, it is located in the city centre close to the mainline station, the Central Library and Graves Art Gallery, Sheffield Hallam University, and Sheffield Theatres. Designed by architects Pringle Richards Sharratt, the building is primarily made from concrete and glass, with a series of galleries extending from a central avenue, which connects Arundel Gate with Sheffield Winter Garden. In 2011, the gallery was listed as the 15th most-visited free attraction in the country by Visit England. It is managed by Museums Sheffield.

The gallery has two permanent collections, two temporary exhibition spaces, space for corporate events and weddings, and a cafe and shop.

== Ruskin Collection ==
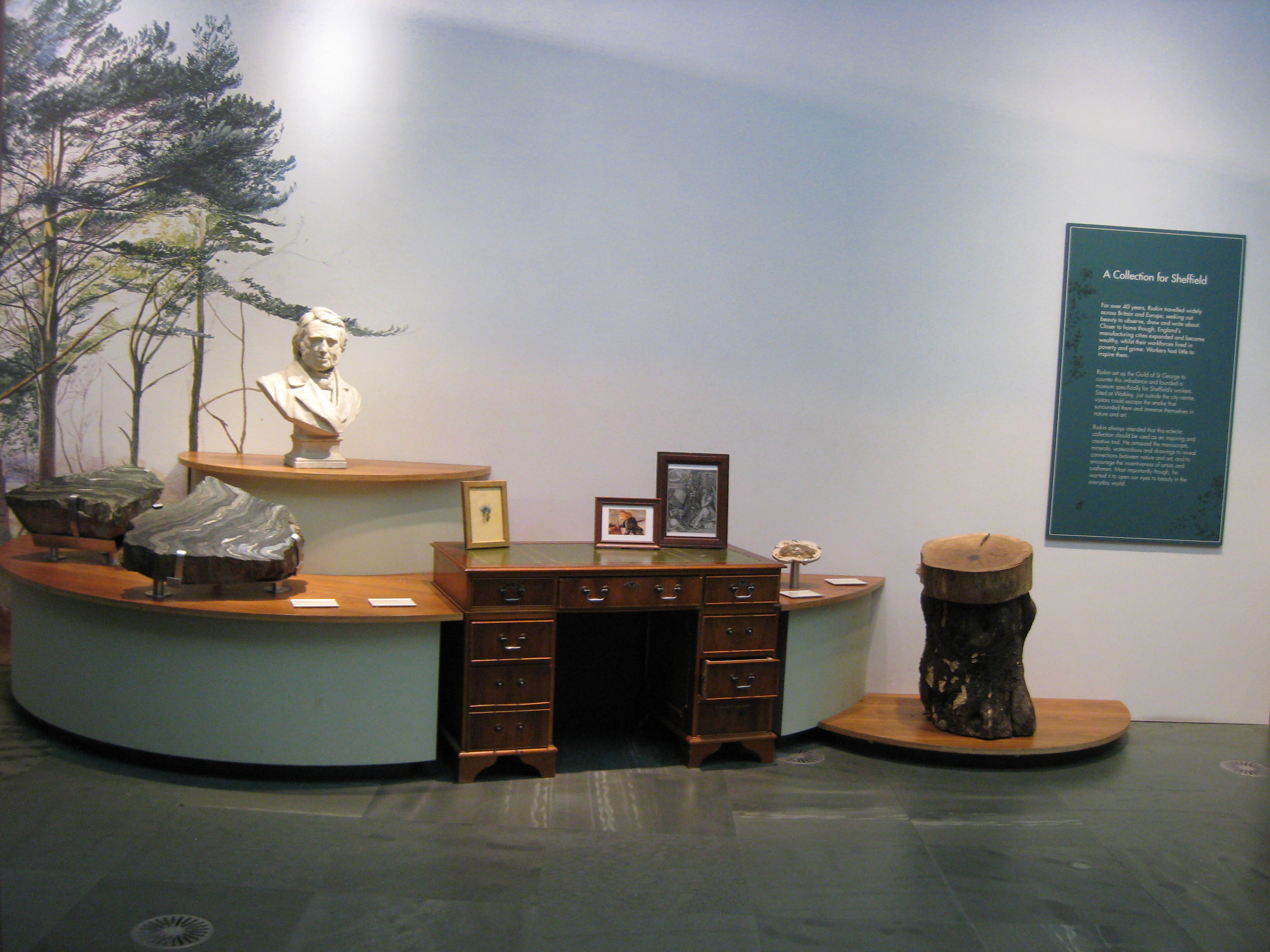
Part of the Ruskin Collection

Eminent Victorian scholar John Ruskin established a collection of material he hoped would inspire Sheffield's workforce at the newly founded St George's Museum, Walkley, Sheffield in 1875. The collection of watercolours, drawings, prints, plaster casts, minerals, illustrated books, manuscripts and coins is owned by the Guild of St George and managed by Museums Sheffield at the Millennium Gallery. The gallery displaying it was refurbished in 2011, to allow more frequent rotation of items from the collection which is too large and fragile to display at any one time.

Marcel Proust wrote of the Ruskin Collection:

Its catalogue is like an epitome of all the arts and all the sciences. Photographs of paintings by the masters are found next to collections of minerals, as in Goethe's house. Like the Ruskin Museum, Ruskin's oeuvre is universal.

== Metalwork Collection ==
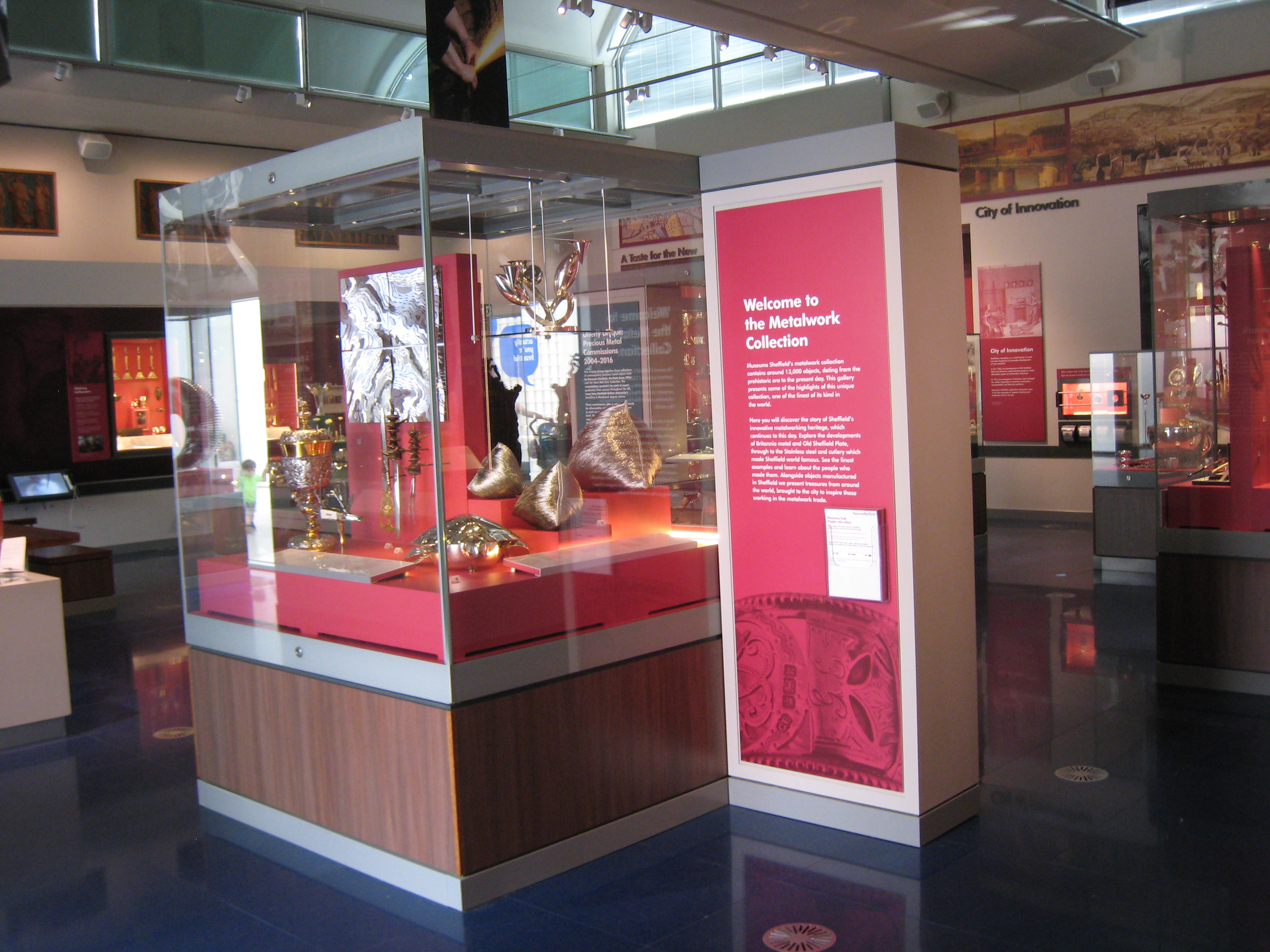
Part of the Metalwork Collection

Sheffield's metalwork collection comprises more than 13,000 objects and has been awarded Designated Collection status by DCMS, signifying a 'pre-eminent collection of national and international importance held in England's non-national museums'. The collection includes what is probably the most extensive grouping of Sheffield-made cutlery, flatware (forks and spoons) and holloware (e.g. bowls, teapots, containers) in existence and was amassed as a reference collection; showcasing examples of excellent design and high quality craftsmanship from around the world to inspire the city’s manufacturers, designers and makers.

== Craft & Design ==
The Craft & Design gallery is a temporary exhibition space intended to build on the tradition of the Ruskin and Metalwork collections in providing creative inspiration through examples of excellence. Following the theme of historic and contemporary craft and design, recent exhibitions have included Kill Your Darlings by Kid Acne and Graphic Nature in 2011, Under the Sea in 2012, and Designed to Shine in 2013, marking the 100th anniversary of the discovery of stainless steel in Sheffield.

== Special exhibitions ==
The special exhibition space is the largest in Sheffield and was designed to accommodate major touring exhibitions from national partners such as the V&A and Tate. Major exhibitions in recent years include Vivienne Westwood: the Exhibition in 2008, Watercolour in Britain and Restless Times in 2010, John Martin: Painting the Apocalypse in 2011, The Family in British Art and Paul Morrison: Auctorum in 2012 and Force of Nature: Picturing Ruskin's Landscape in 2013.
