= Sheffield Town Hall =

Municipal building in Sheffield, South Yorkshire, England

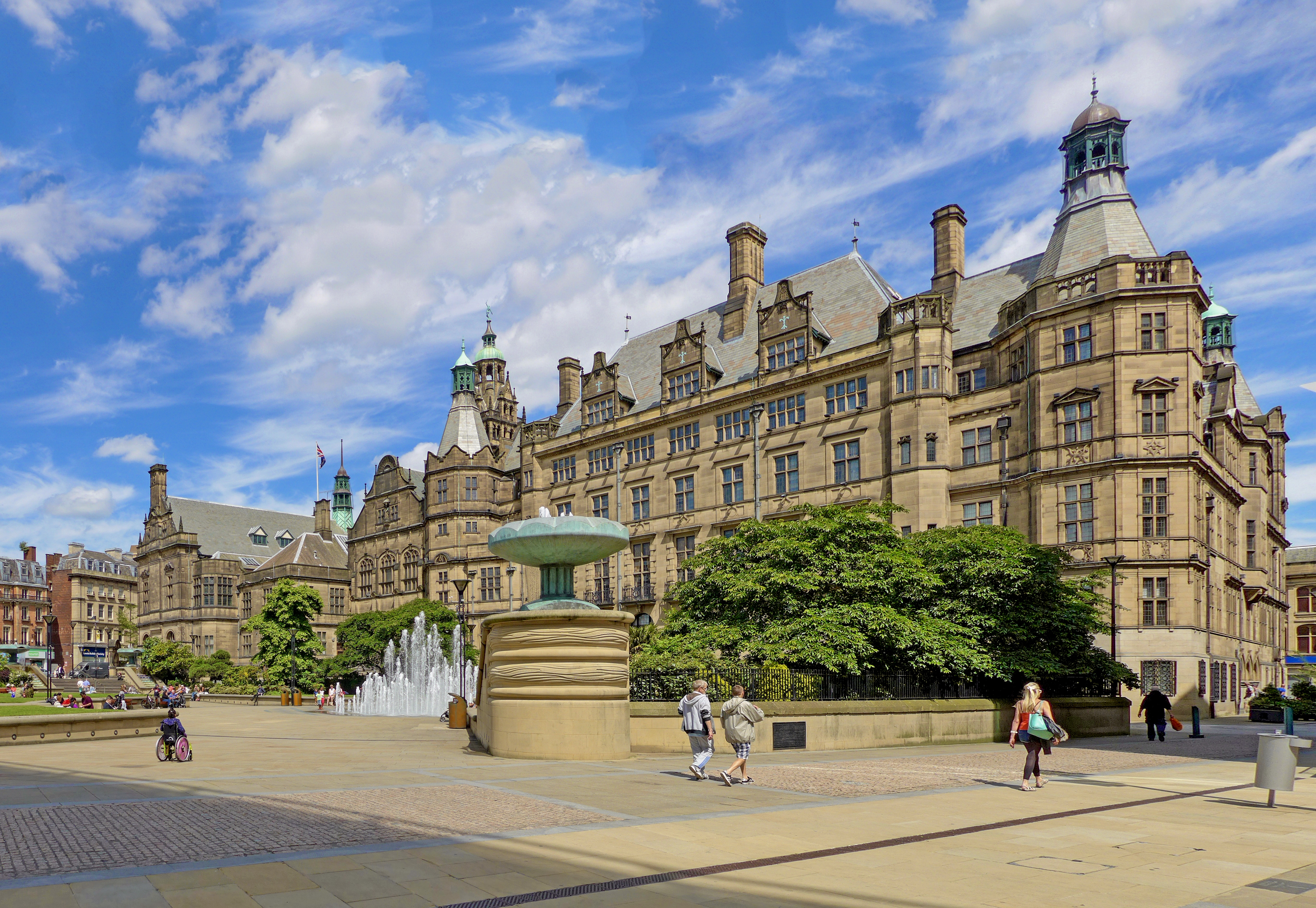
- Sheffield Town Hall & Peace Gardens

Record height
- Tallest in Sheffield from 1896 to 1965^{[I]}
- Preceded by: Cathedral Church of St Marie and St John's Church
- Surpassed by: Arts Tower

General information
- Status: Completed
- Type: Government
- Classification

Listed Building – Grade I
- Designated: 28 June 1973
- Reference no.: 1246902
- Location: Sheffield, South Yorkshire, England
- Coordinates: 53.3803398°N 1.4694321°W
- Completed: 1897
- Opening: 1897
- Owner: Sheffield City Council

Height
- Roof: 61 m (200 ft)
- Top floor: 61 m (200 ft)

Technical details
- Floor count: 6

Design and construction
- Architect: Edward William Mountford

Other information
- Public transit: B P Y TT; Cathedral

Sheffield Town Hall is a municipal building on Pinstone Street in the City of Sheffield, England. The building is used by Sheffield City Council, and also contains a publicly displayed collection of silverware. It is a Grade I listed building.

== History ==
The current building, commissioned to replace the Old Town Hall, was designed by the London-based architect Edward William Mountford in the Renaissance Revival style and constructed between 1890 and 1897. The building was opened by Queen Victoria, using a remote control lock from her carriage, on 21 May 1897. The turning of the key in the lock triggered a light in the building which was the signal for three concealed men to open the gates.

An extension designed by F. E. P. Edwards was opened by the Prince of Wales on 29 May 1923.

The gardens were first laid out in 1938, following the demolition of St Paul's Church. Originally named St Paul's Gardens, they were immediately nicknamed the "Peace Gardens", marking the contemporary signing of the Munich Agreement.

An extension designed in the Brutalist style was added to the east of the Peace Gardens in 1977; nicknamed The Egg-Box after its appearance, it was demolished in 2002.

== Exterior ==
The design of the exterior echoed to a certain extent the architecture of the adjacent St. Paul's Church of 1720 (now demolished). During construction, the building was criticised for its expensive embellishments. The exterior is built of Stoke stone from the Stoke Hall Quarry in Grindleford, Derbyshire and is decorated with carvings by F. W. Pomeroy. The friezes depict the industries of Sheffield, and the 64-metre-high clock-tower is surmounted by a statue of Vulcan. The clock, by Potts of Leeds, was provided with striking and chiming trains, but bells were never installed in the clock-tower so they remained unused. In 2002 an electronic bell sound system was added to provide hourly strikes and Westminster-style quarter chimes.

Tower

Main entrance

Relief above the main entrance

== Interior ==
The entry contains displays relating to HMS Sheffield and leads to the Main Entrance Hall with a grand marble staircase. This also has an Electrolier an electric chandelier, part of the original lighting of the building. The walls include friezes including a depiction of the slaying of the Dragon of Wharncliffe. On the first landing is a statue of the first Lord Mayor Henry Fitzalan-Howard, 15th Duke of Norfolk.

The first floor has a gallery running its length which can be divided into four sections by means of powered oak panels descending from the ceiling. The south room is the Lord Mayor's Parlour which is kept permanently divided. On the same floor is the oak-panelled Council Room and its antechamber, which has above its door the advice "Be Ye wise as serpents and harmless as doves", a quotation from the Bible (Matthew 10:16).

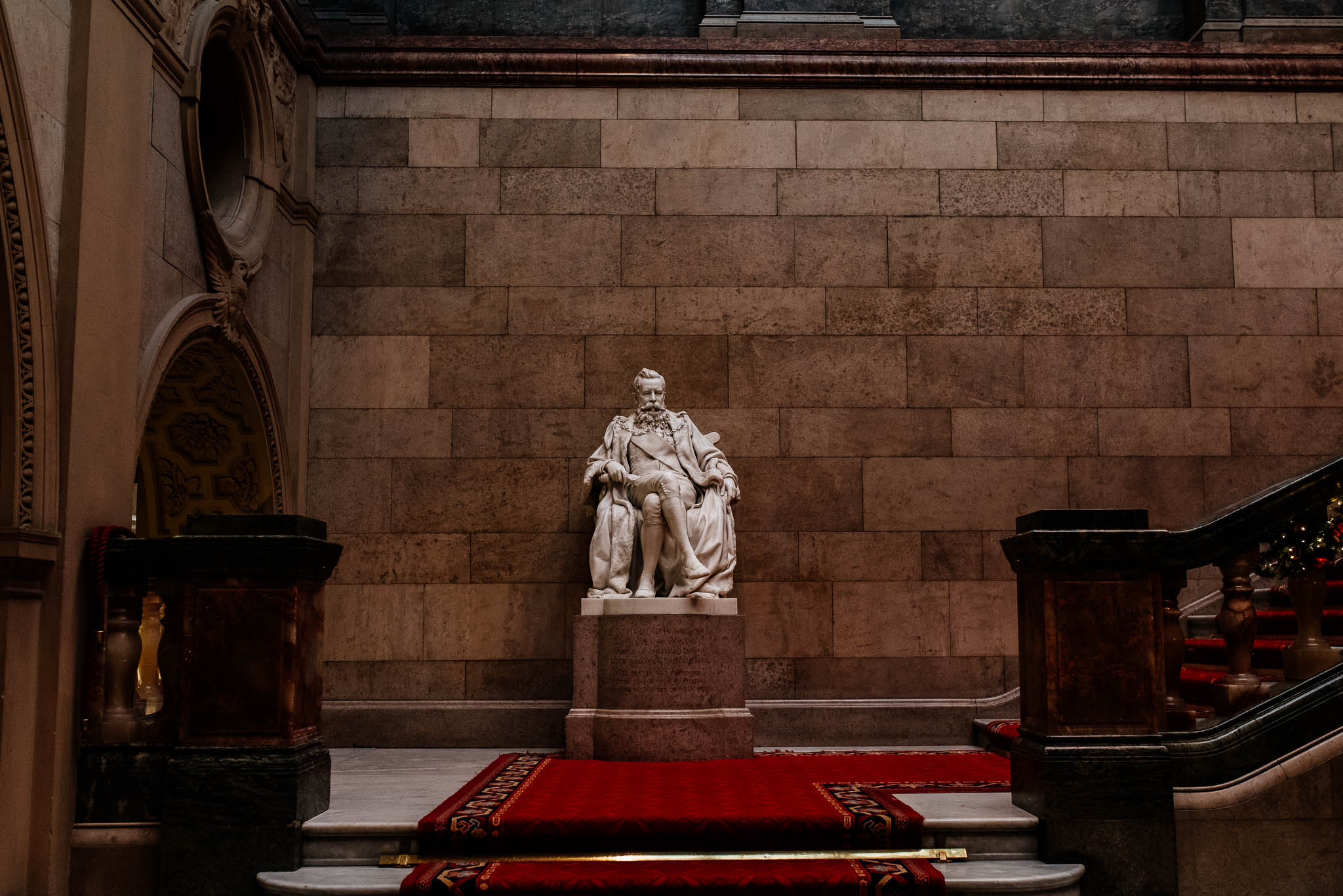
Statue of the first Lord Mayor of Sheffield

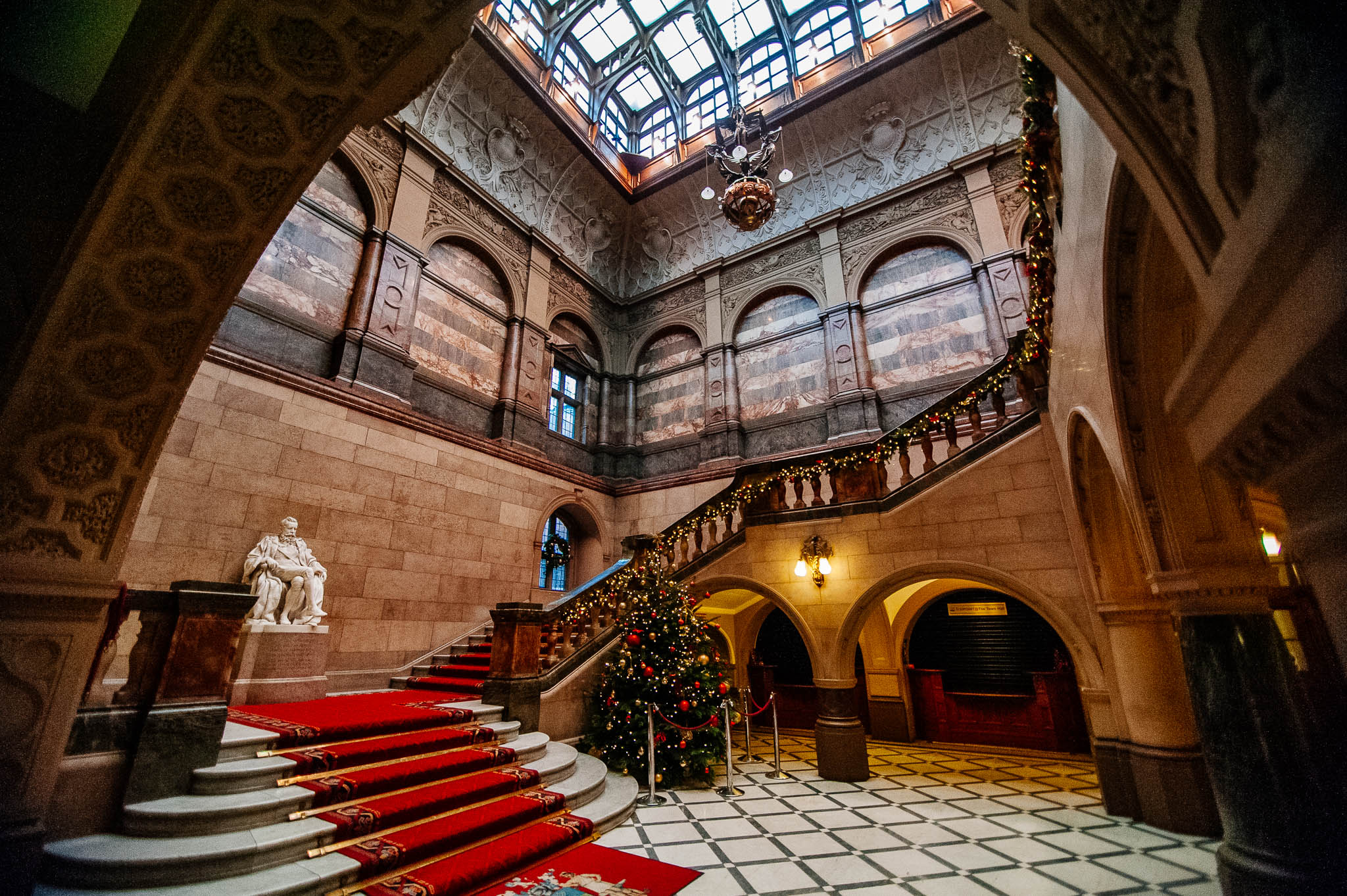
Staircase at Sheffield Town Hall decorated for Christmas

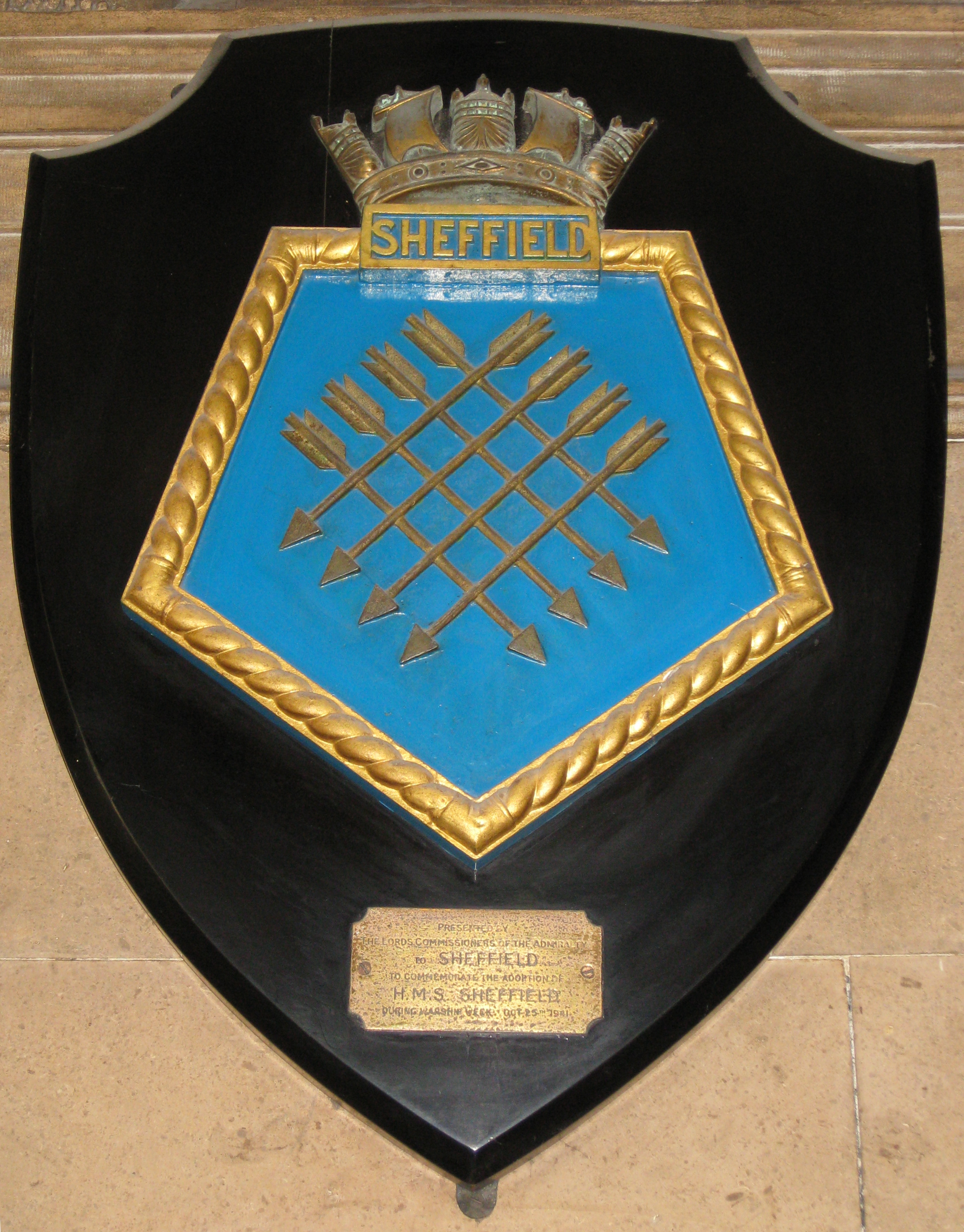
HMS Sheffield plaque 1941

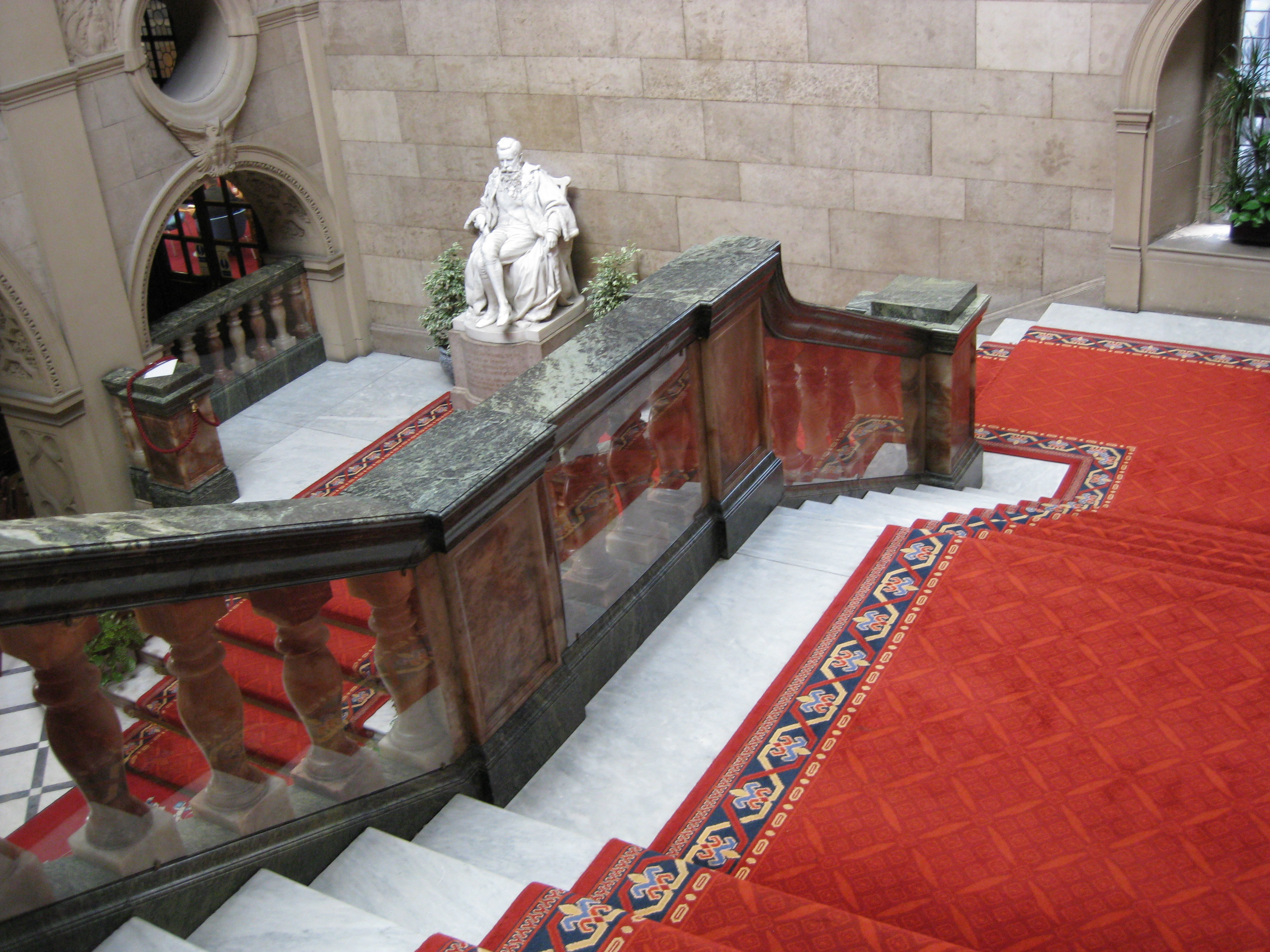
Staircase, with statue of the first Lord Mayor

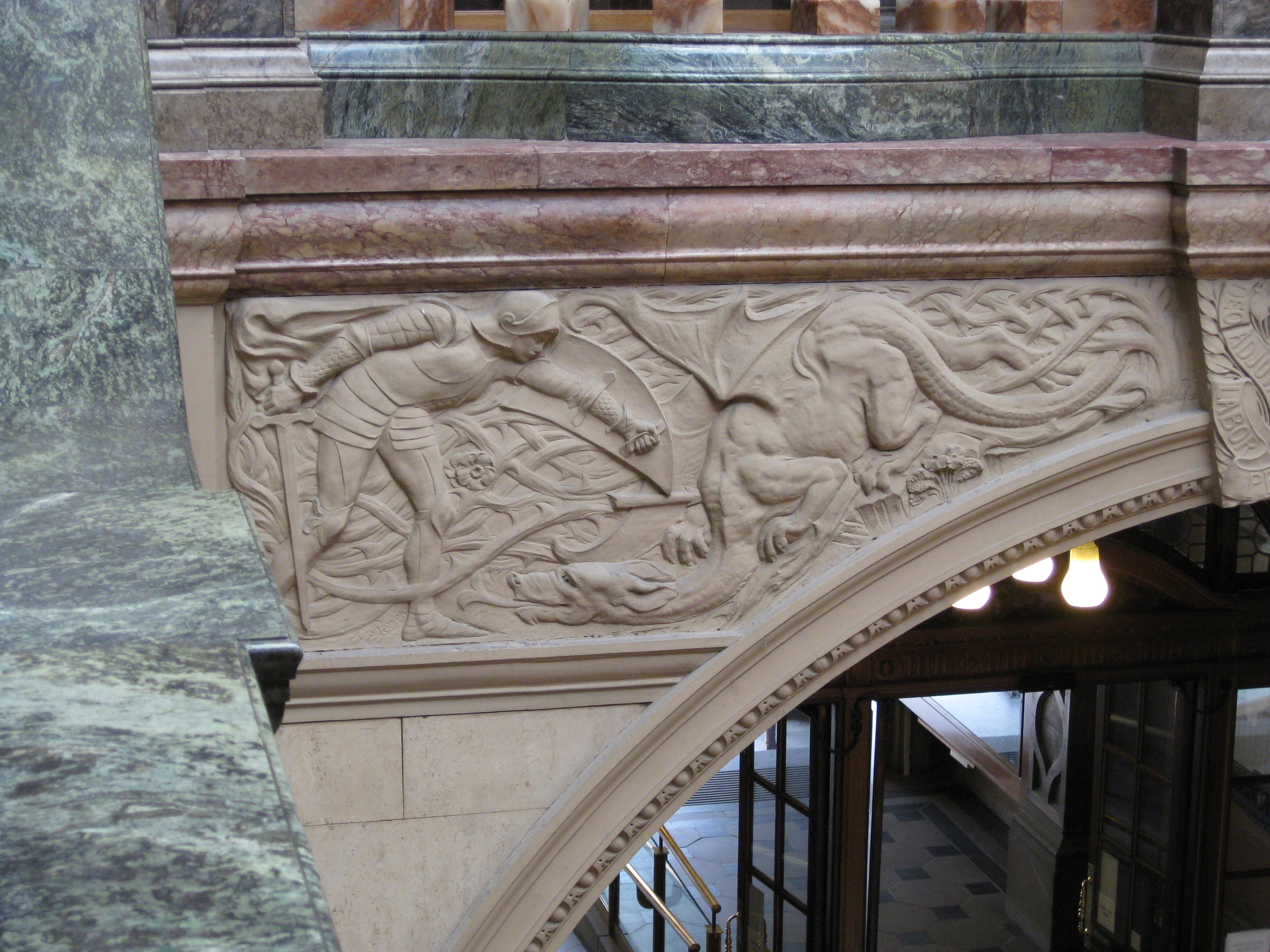
Slaying the Wharncliffe dragon

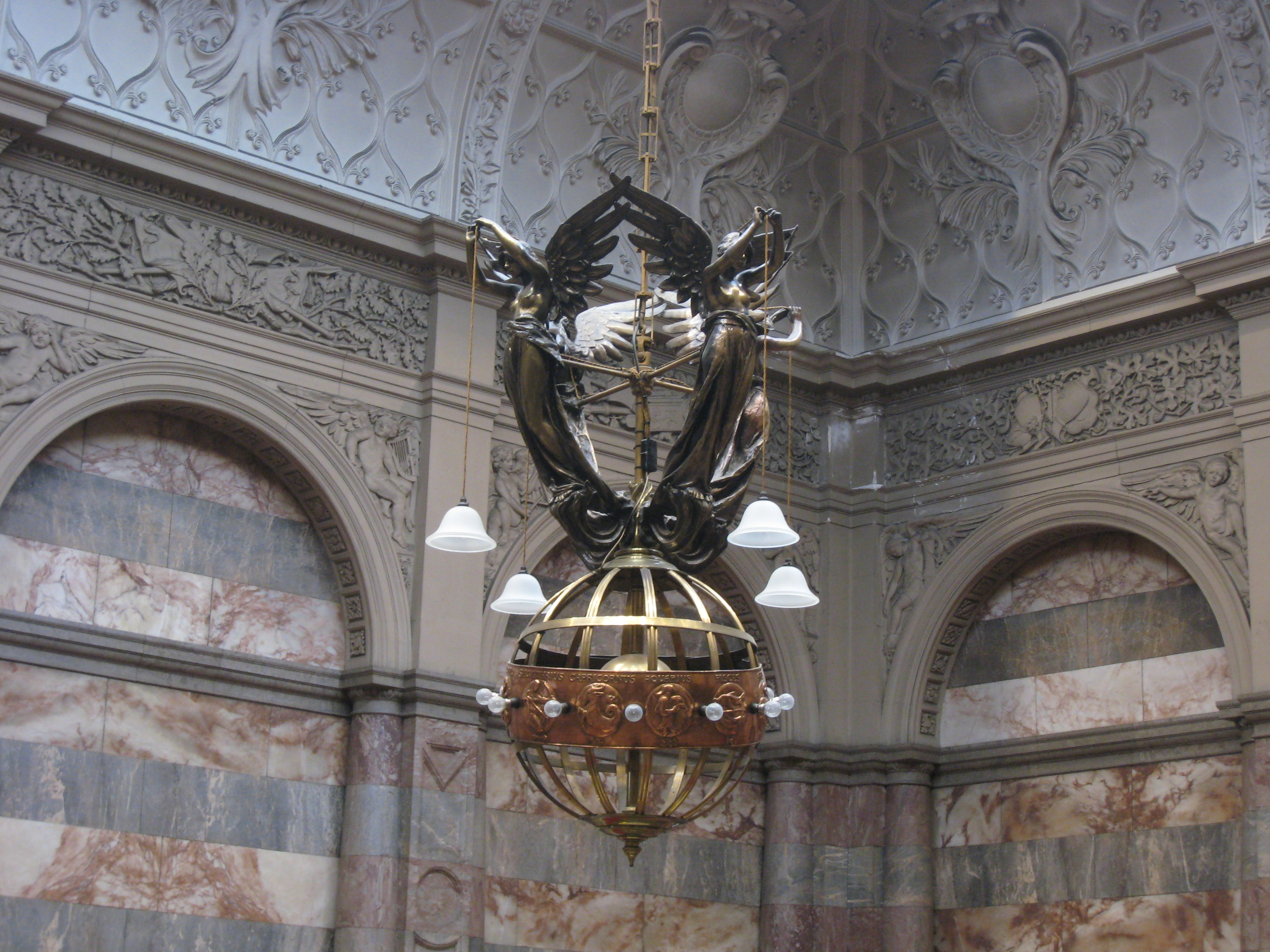
Electrolier

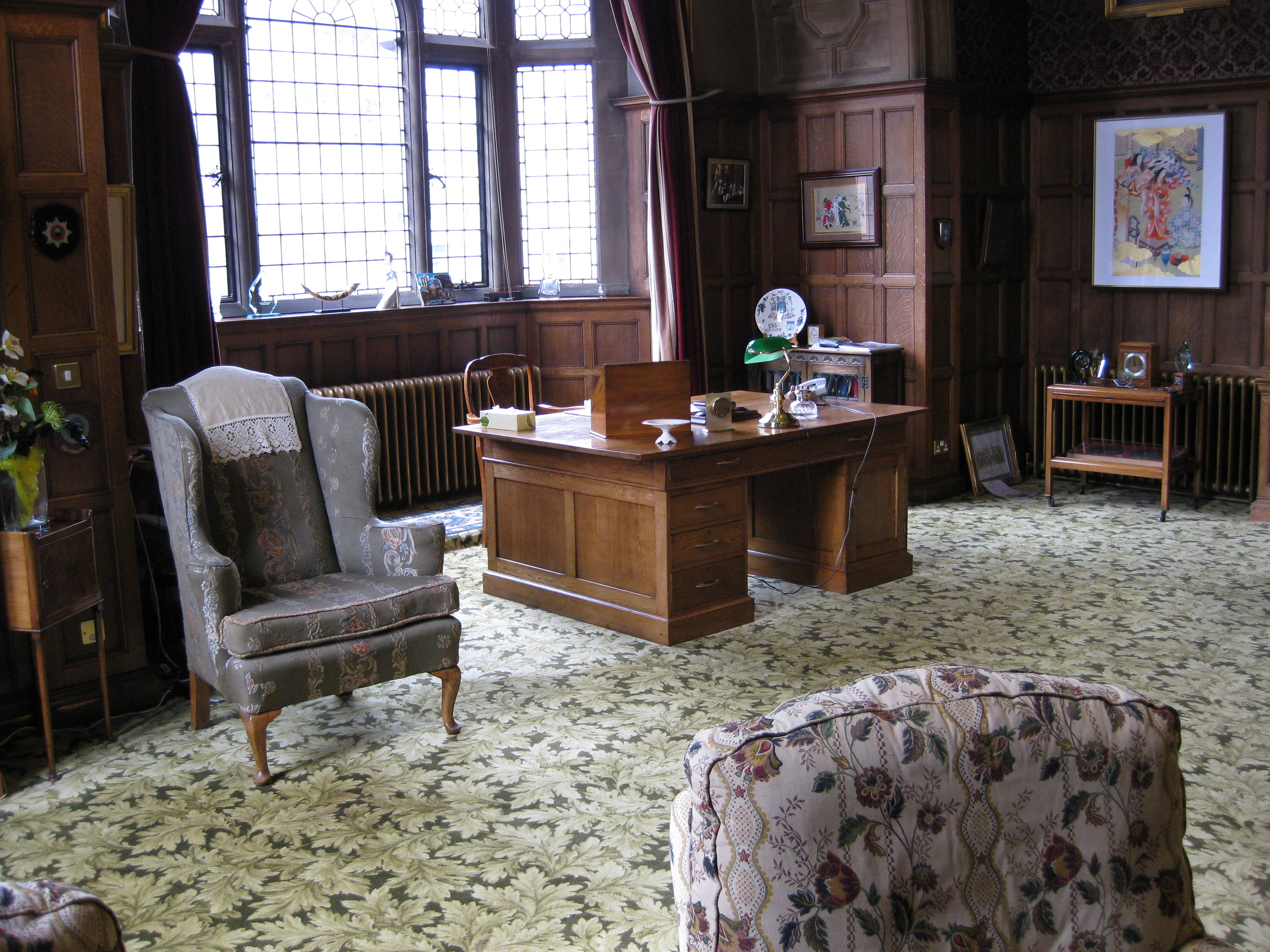
Lord Mayor's Parlour

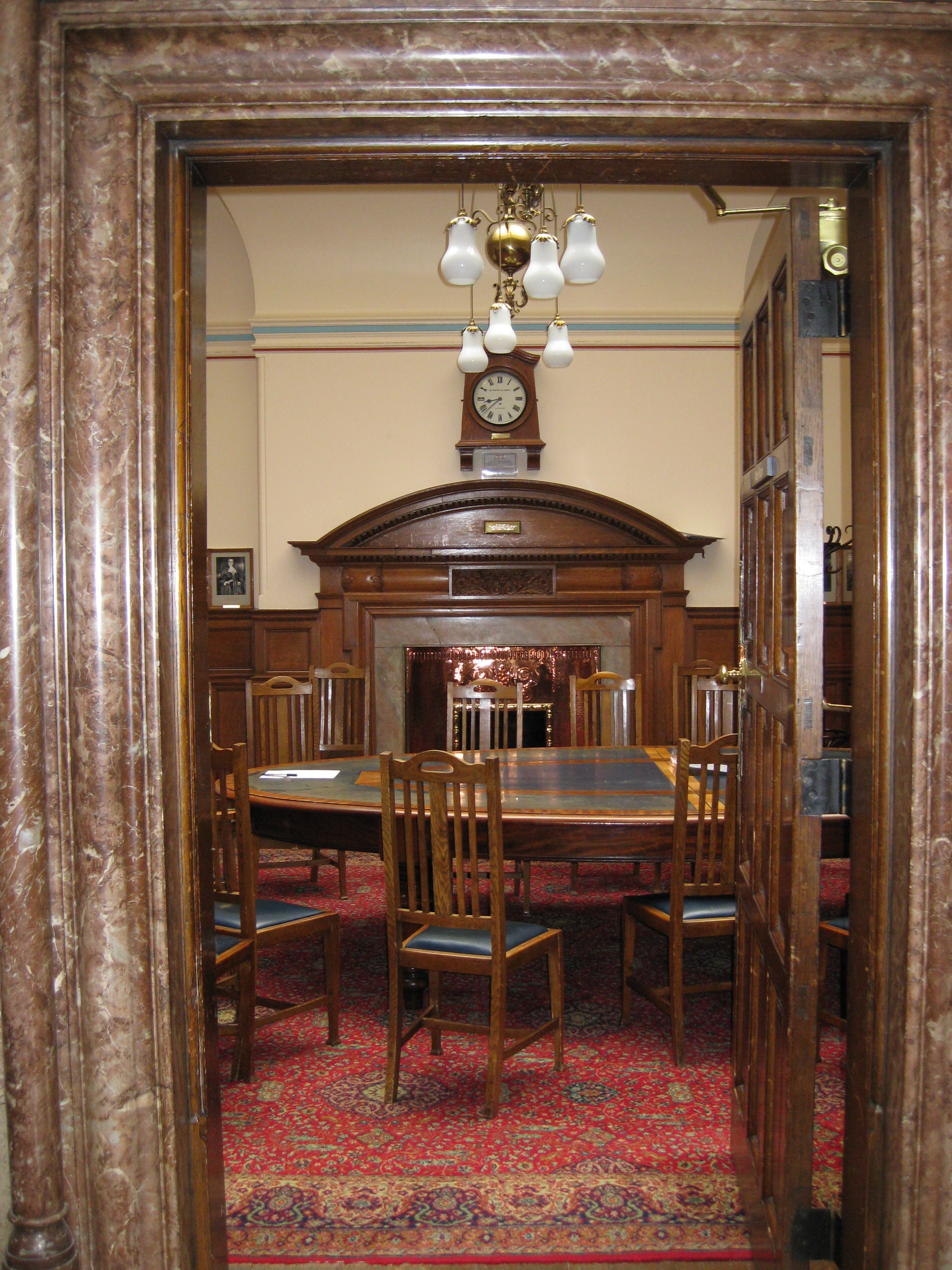
Council Chamber

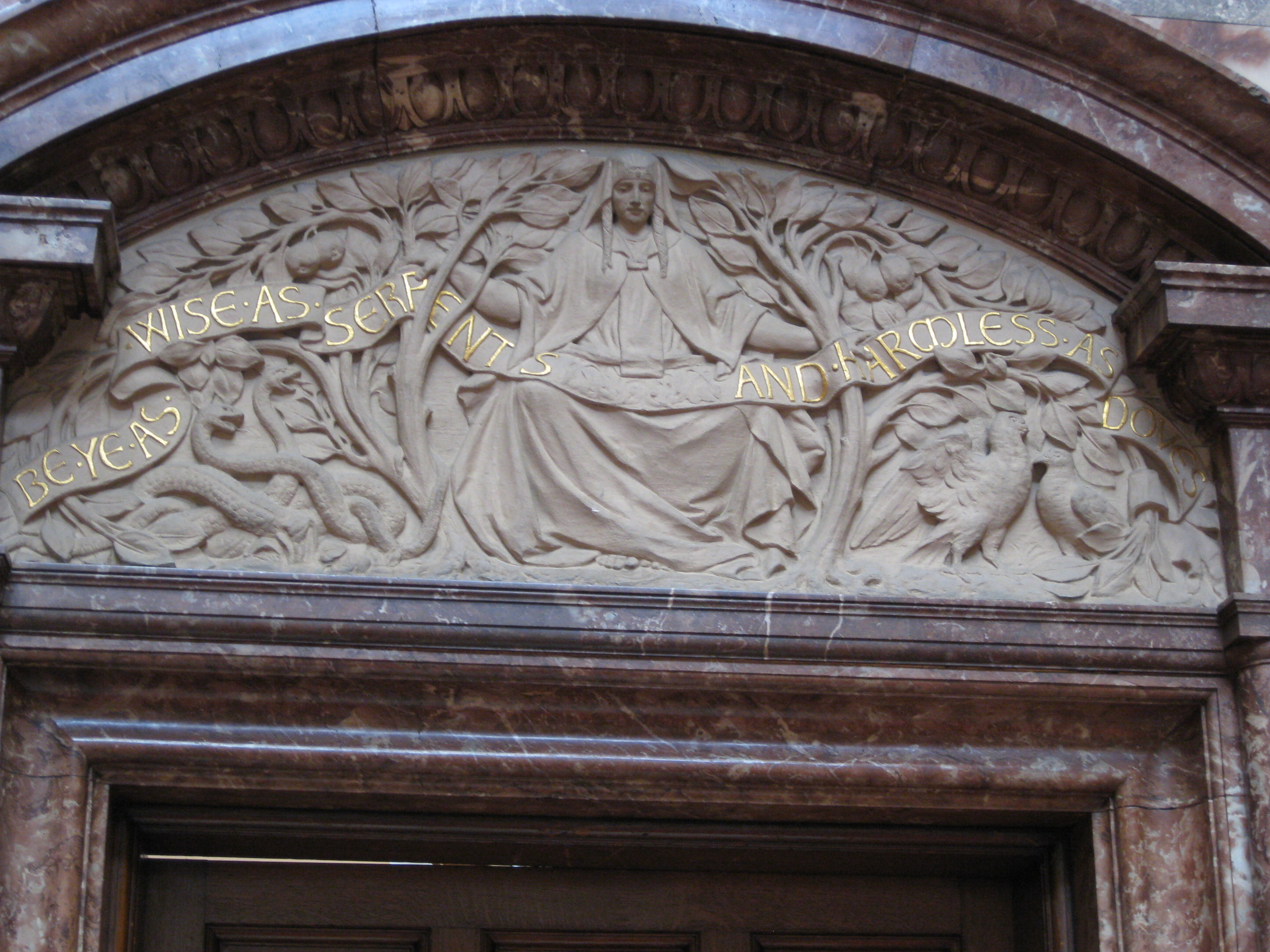
Above the door to the Council Chamber

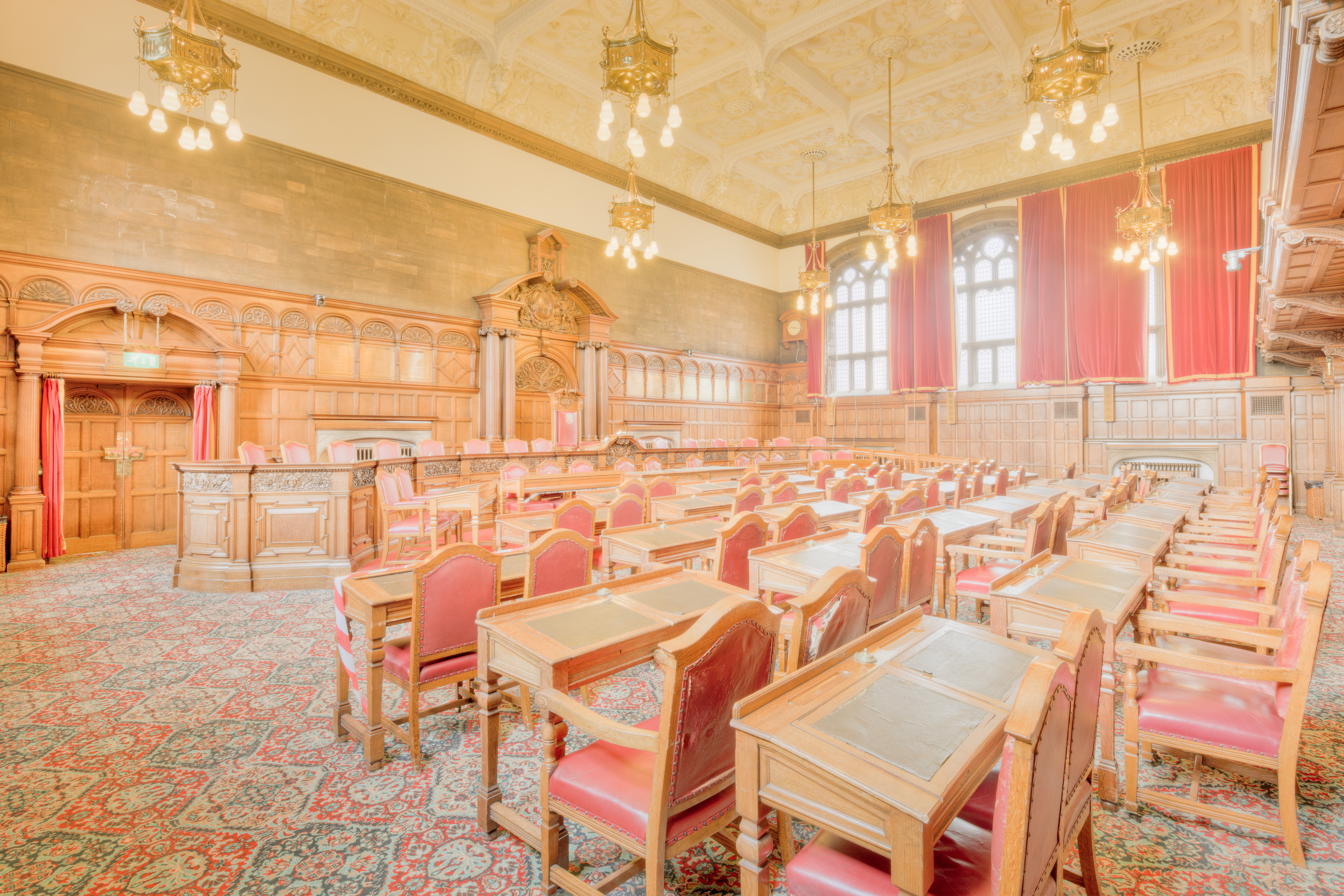
Council Chambers

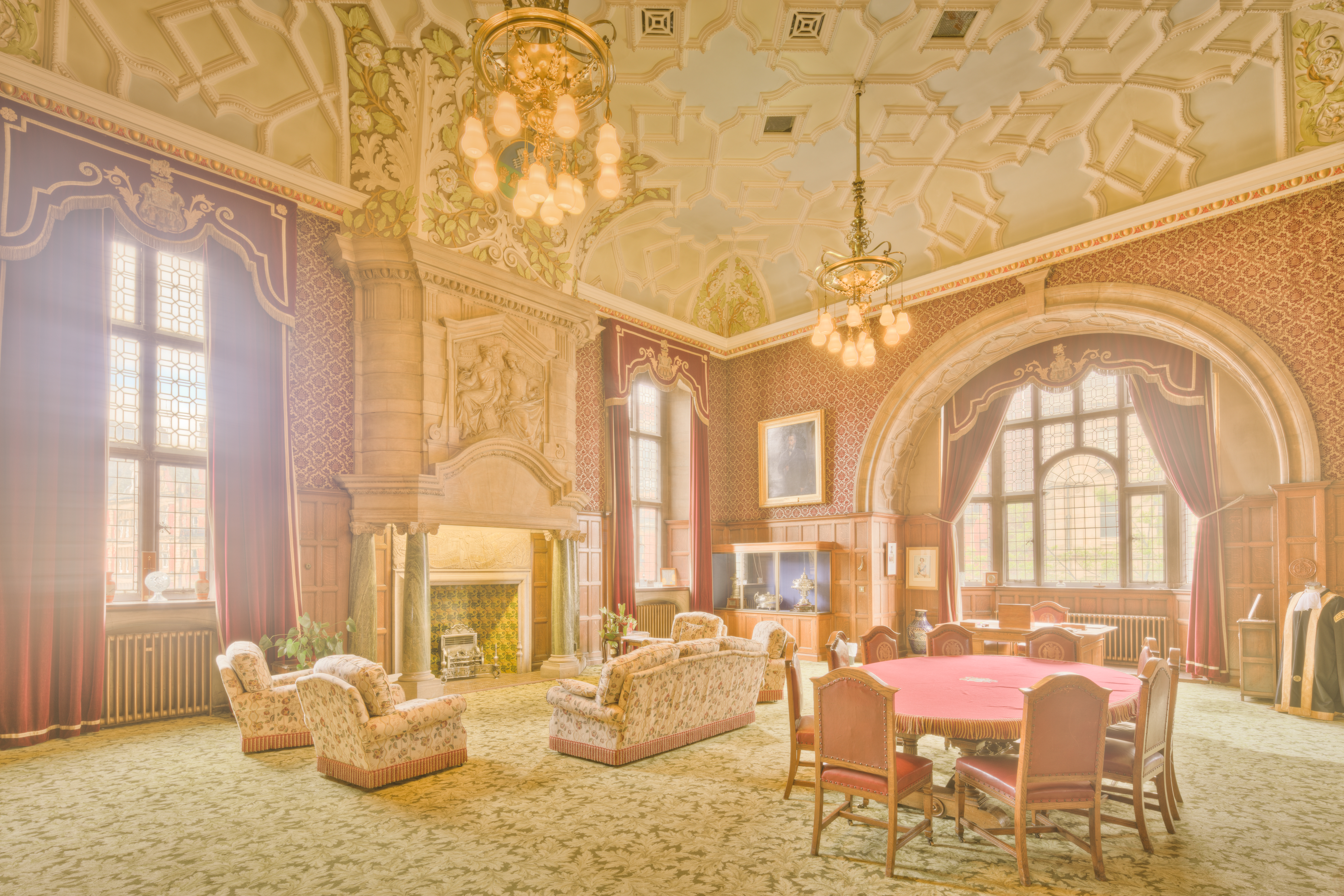
Mayors Parlour Room

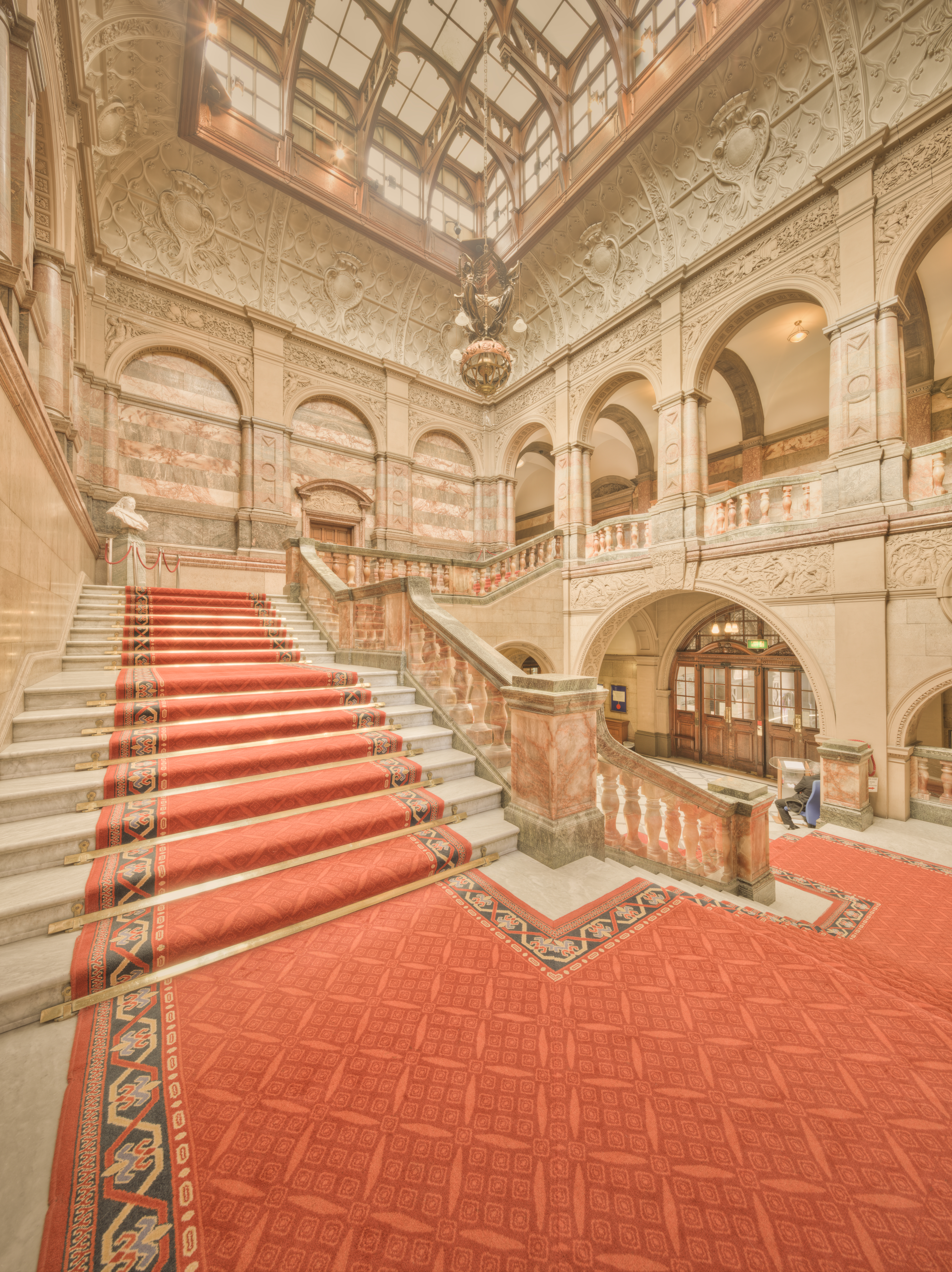
Main stairs

== See also ==
- Listed buildings in Sheffield

Records
| Preceded by Cathedral Church of St Marie; 59 m (195 ft) | Tallest building in Sheffield; 1896 – 1965 | Succeeded by Arts Tower; 78 m (256 ft) |
