= Peace Gardens =

Square in Sheffield, England

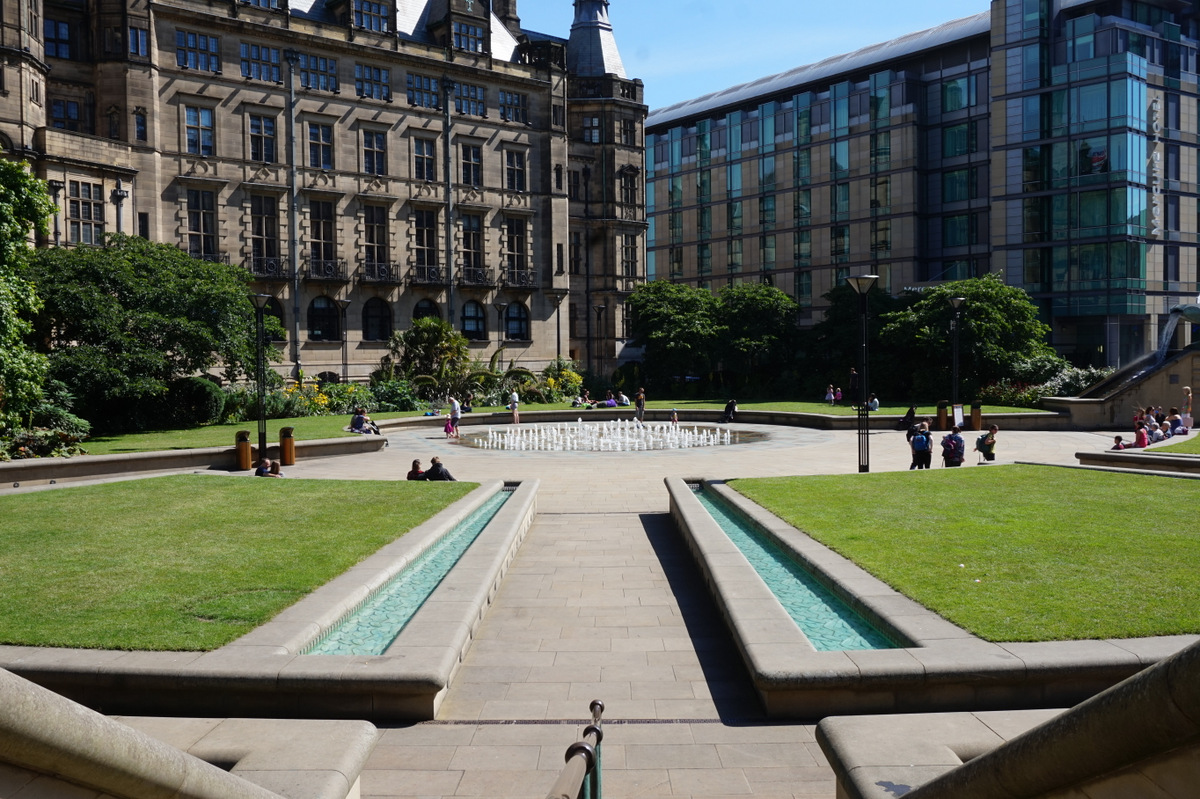
- The Gardens
- Interactive map of Peace Gardens
- Former name: St Paul's Gardens
- Maintained by: City of Sheffield
- Location: Sheffield, England
- Coordinates: 53.38°N 1.4696°W

Construction
- Completion: 1938

Other
- Website: https://www.sheffield.gov.uk/parks-sport-recreation/public-spaces/peace-gardens
- Public transit: B P Y TT; Cathedral

The Peace Gardens are an inner city square in Sheffield, England. The Gardens themselves front onto Sheffield's gothic town hall, not to be confused with Sheffield City Hall (a concert venue), or the Sheffield Old Town Hall.

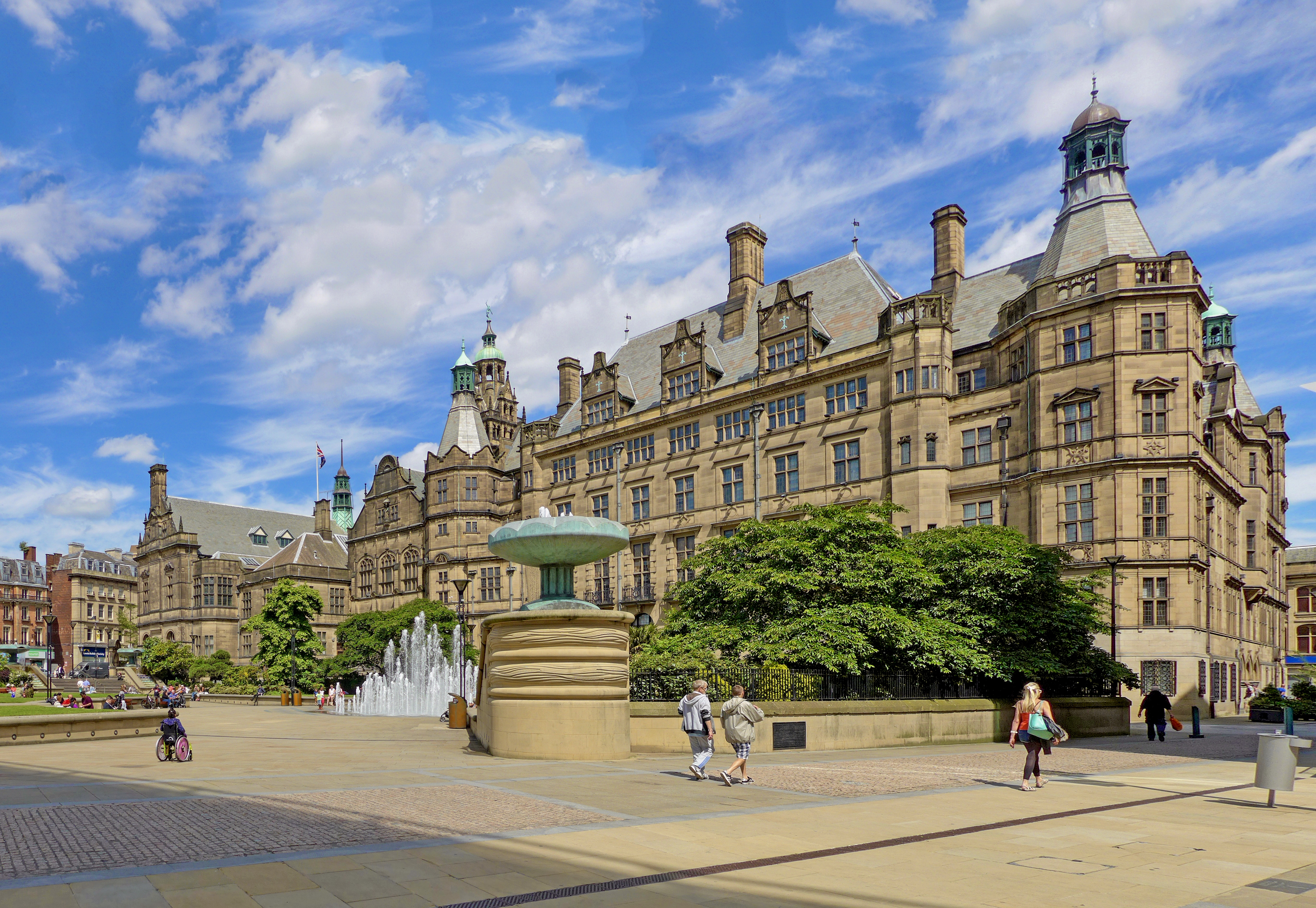
The Peace Gardens looking west towards the town hall

== History ==
The Gardens were first laid out in 1938, following the demolition of St Paul's Church. Originally named St Paul's Gardens, they were immediately nicknamed the "Peace Gardens", marking the contemporary signing of the Munich Agreement. The Gardens were originally intended to be replaced by an extension to the Town Hall, but due to the Second World War, this was never built. In 1985, the space was formally renamed the "Peace Gardens". The Sheffield gardens are a fine example of the network of similar gardens created between the two world wars and presage later gardens and community spaces in London and other urban centres.

In 1997 work commenced to remove the former St Pauls graveyard, and the whole space was re-modelled. Water features and a central fountain were introduced, with the channels representing the rivers of Sheffield. The construction work was carried out by Tilbury Douglas Construction under a management form of contract, with the design work carried out mainly by Sheffield City Council. The "topping out ceremony" was carried out by Prince Charles, and a plaque on Pinstone Street was unveiled to mark this event. The Peace Gardens were substantially completed by the end of 1998, then the Sheffield Millennium Galleries works commenced and the old egg-box council offices were then demolished. This allowed the remainder of the Peace Gardens to be completed in a second phase, which is also known as Millennium Square.

== Features ==
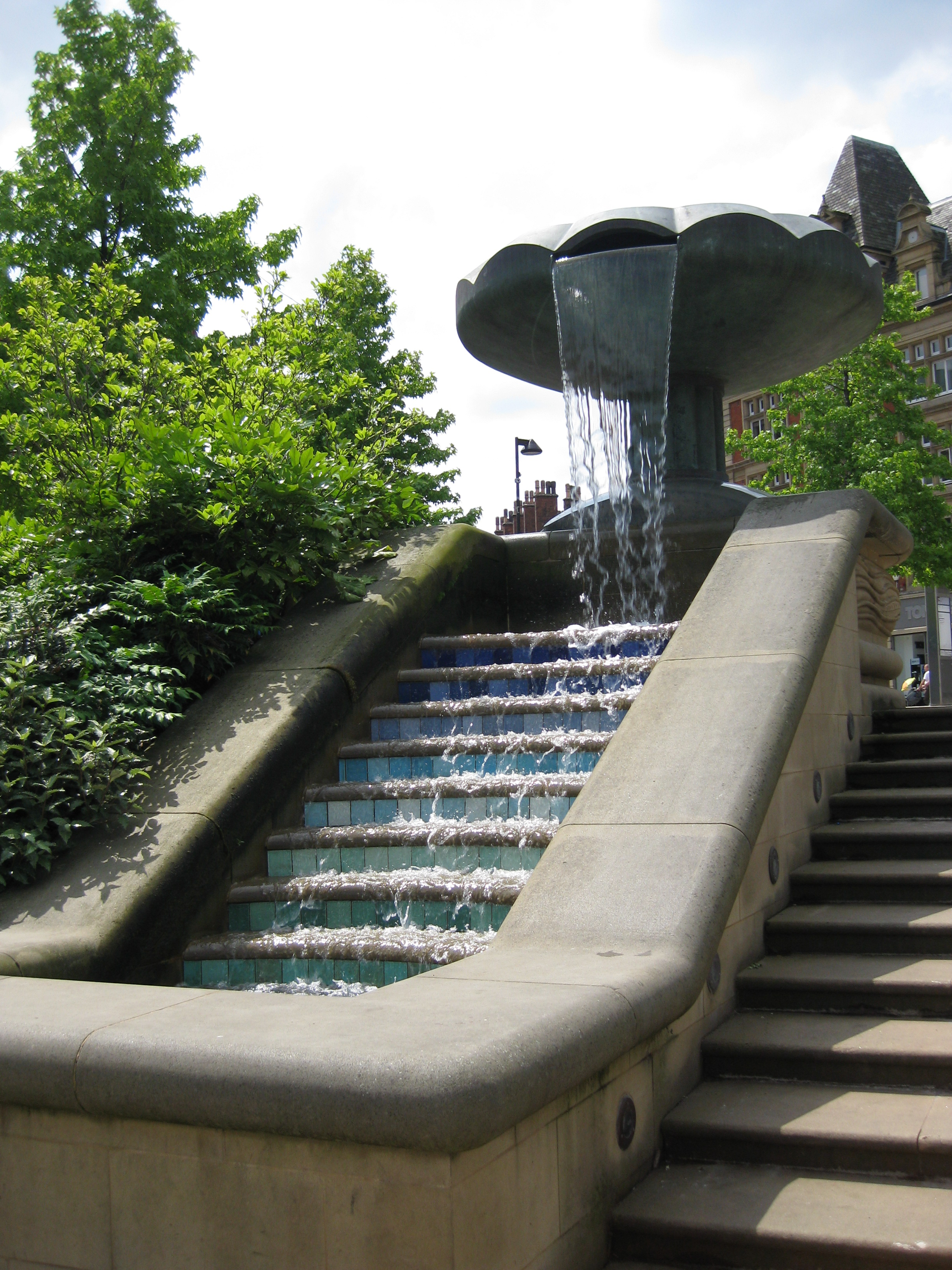
One of the cascades

It has fountains at the centre, and cascades around the outside. These are to represent the flowing molten steel, which made Sheffield famous, and also the water of Sheffield's rivers, the Sheaf, River Don, River Rivelin, River Loxley and Porter Brook, which were used to power the mills which drove Sheffield's industry.

The site contains several memorials for citizens of Sheffield who served in wars, including in the Spanish Civil War and another plaque commemorating Sheffielders who gave their lives in all conflicts, including the Korean War. It also contains a memorial to Hiroshima, unveiled on Hiroshima Day, 8 August 1985, in the presence of three survivors of the atomic devastation. Other memorials include the Holberry Cascades, named for local Chartist leader Samuel Holberry, the Bochum Bell, donated by Sheffield's German twin city Bochum, and a set of standard measures. The measures had previously been located by a wall alongside St Paul's Parade, just outside the Peace Gardens.

== Gallery ==
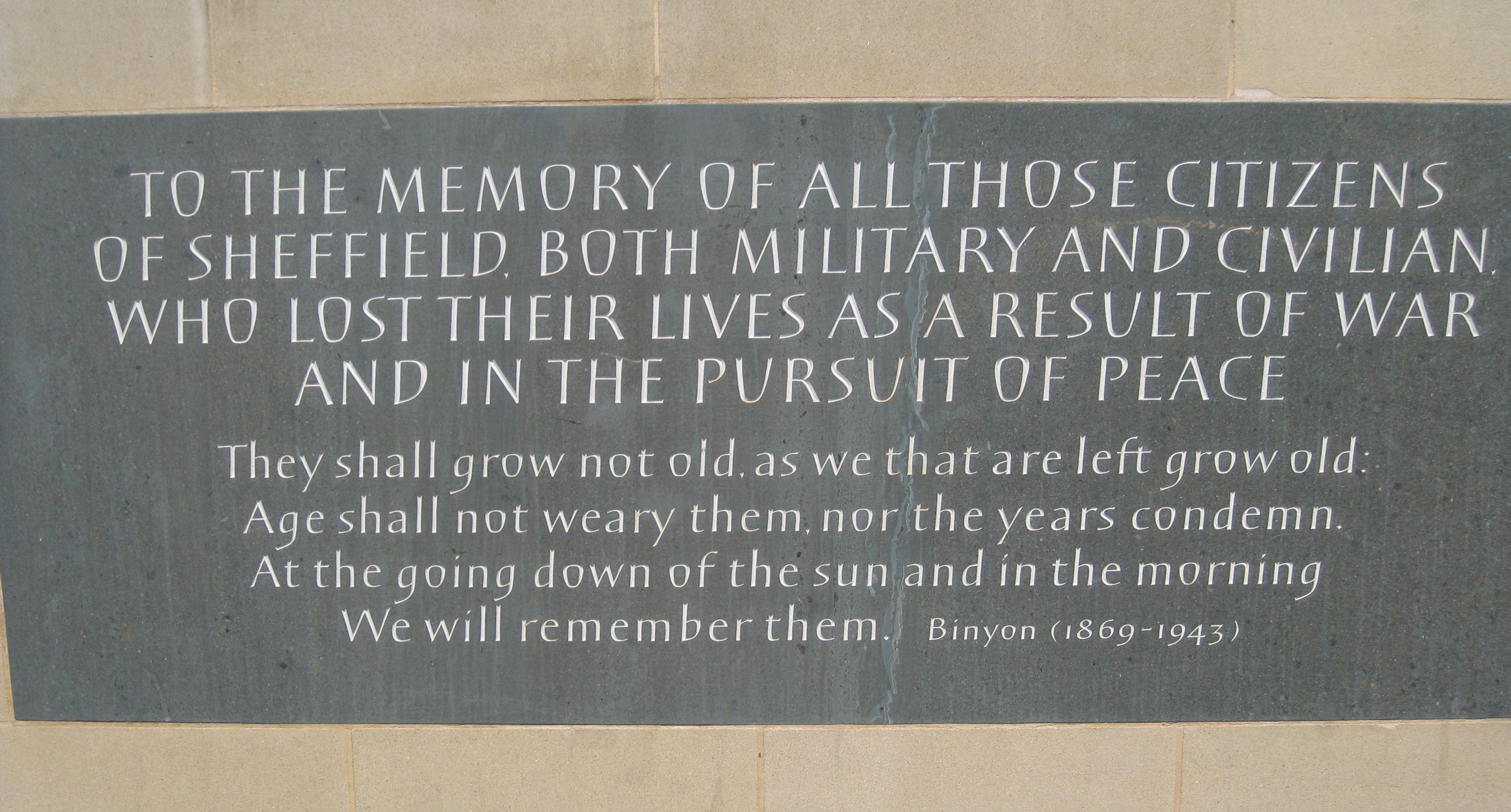
War plaque

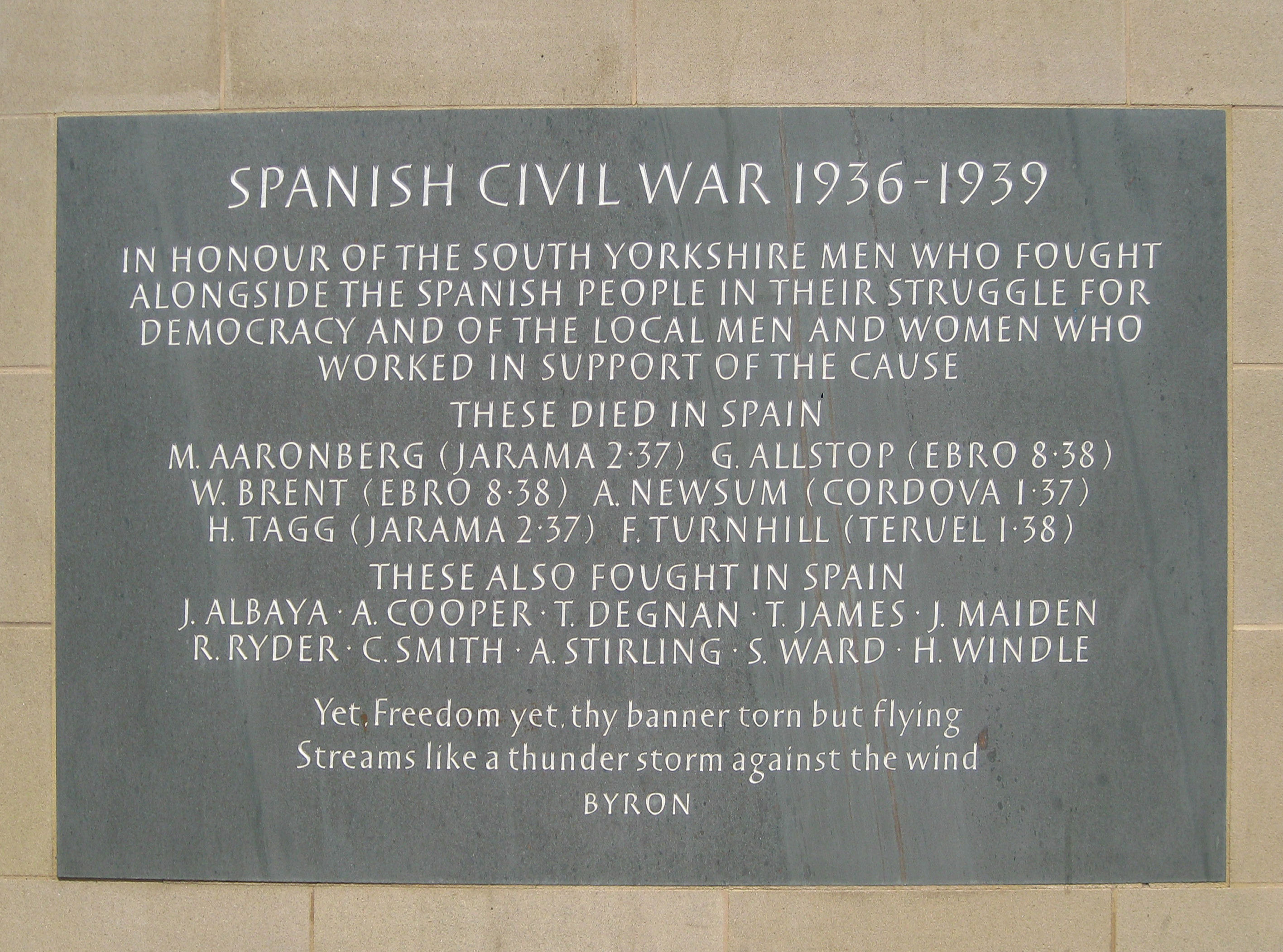
Spanish Civil War Plaque

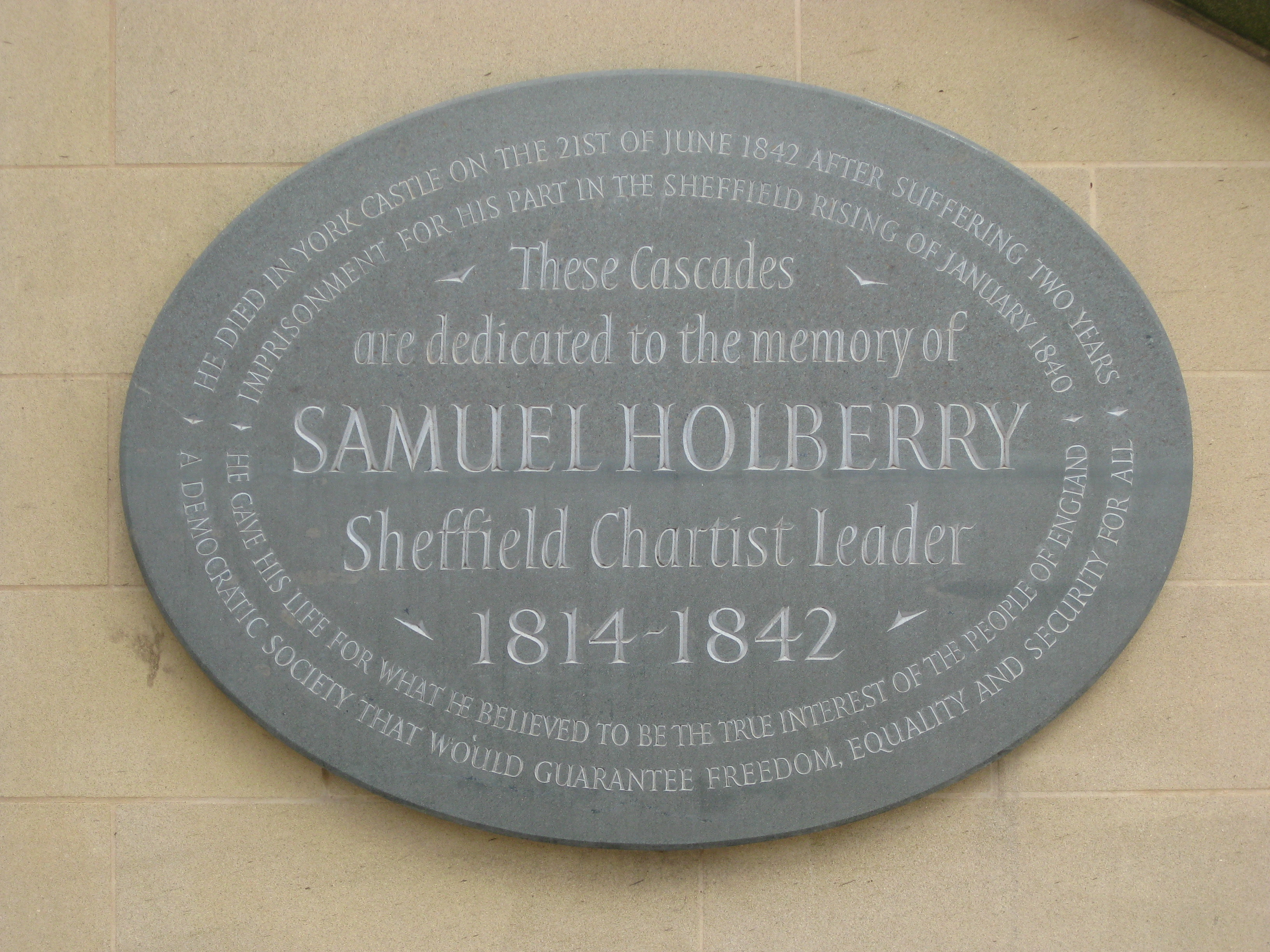
Holberry Plaque

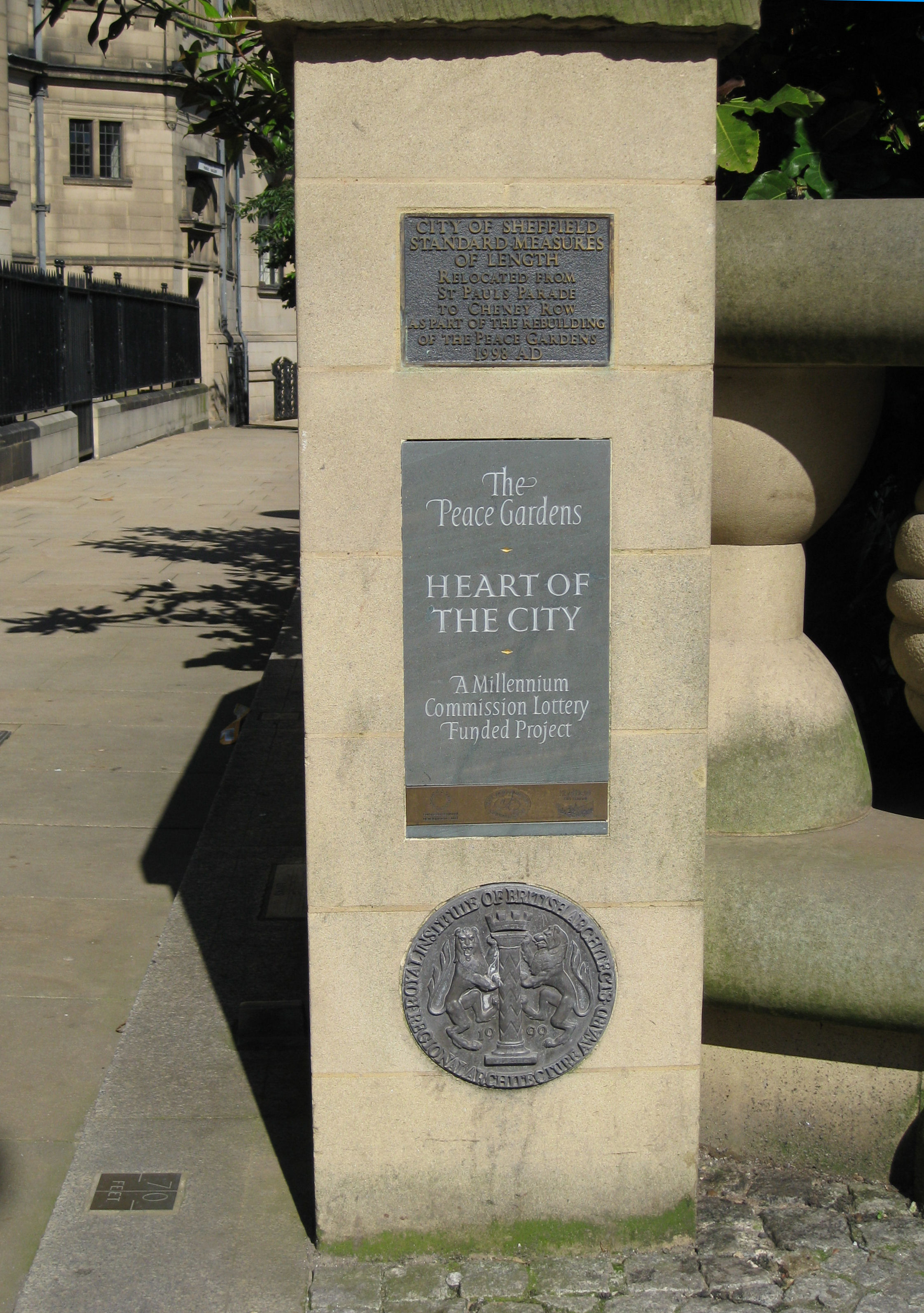
Heart of the City

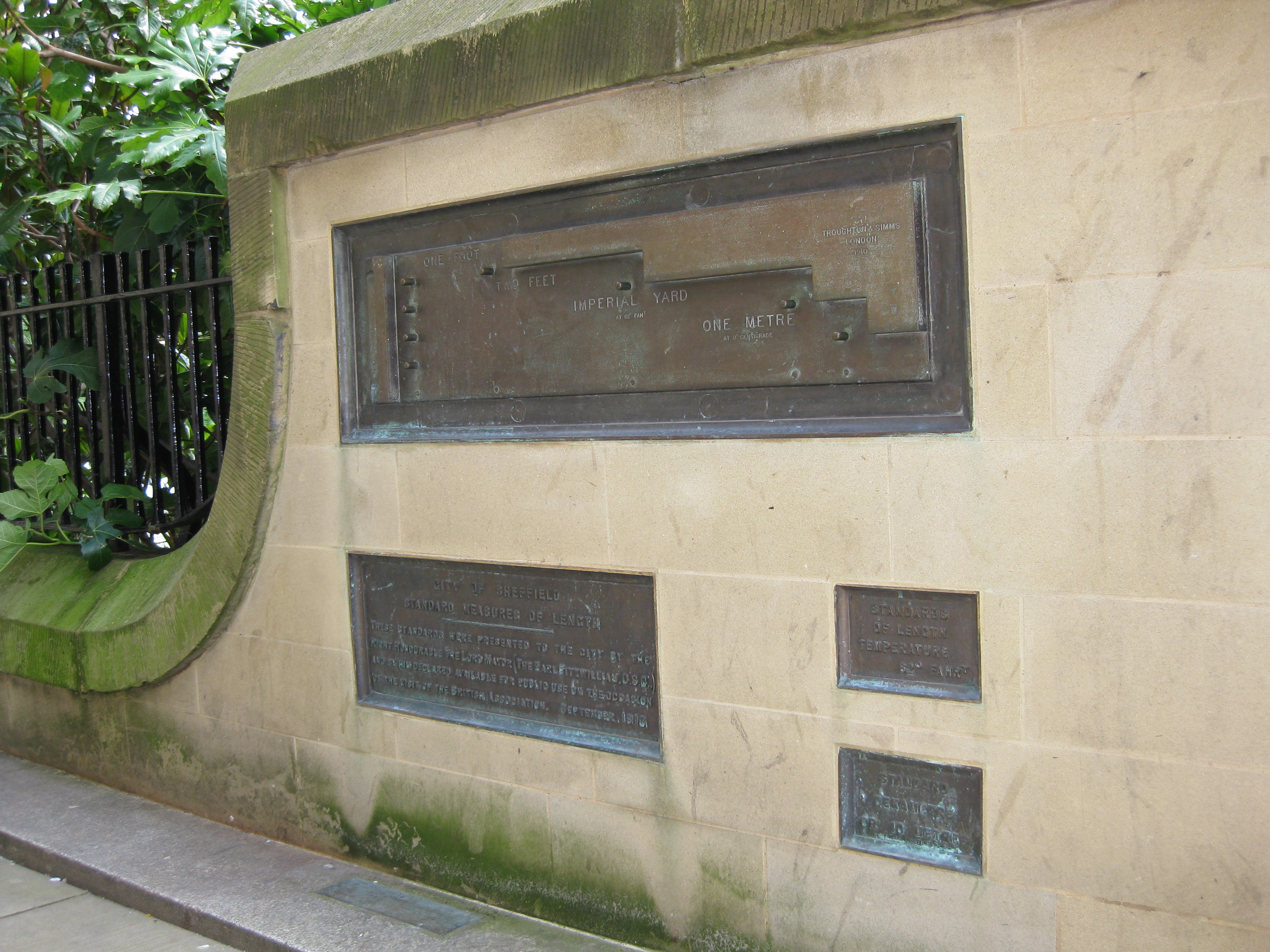
Standard Measures of yard and metre

== See also ==
- Sheffield Town Hall
