= List of tallest buildings and structures in Sheffield =

This list ranks building and structures in Sheffield, England, by height.

== Completed structures ==
This list ranks externally complete buildings and free-standing structures in the Sheffield City Region that stand at least 50 metres (164 ft) tall. This includes buildings that are topped out, even if they are not yet internally complete.

An equals sign (=) following a rank indicates the same height between two or more buildings. The "Year" column indicates the year in which a building was completed. Buildings that have been demolished are not included.

=== Completed ===
| Rank | Name | Image | Height m (ft) | Floors | Year | Primary Use | Location | Notes |
|---|---|---|---|---|---|---|---|---|
| 1 | St Paul's Tower | | 101 m (331 ft) | 32 | 2010 | Residential | Sheffield City Centre | The first skyscraper to be constructed in Sheffield, and the tallest building in the city since 2010. Constructed as the centerpiece of the St Paul's Place redevelopment as part of the wider Heart of the City project. |
| 2 | Calico Sheffield | | 85 m (279 ft) | 27 | 2025 (topped out) | Residential | Sheffield City Centre | Student tower on Broad Lane in the north of Sheffield City Centre. Construction began in December 2023; topped out in April 2025. |
| 3 | Arts Tower | | 78 m (256 ft) | 20 | 1965 | University | West End | The tallest university building in the world at the time of its completion, the Arts Tower remains the tallest university building in the United Kingdom as of 2022. It is owned and operated by the University of Sheffield. Formerly the tallest building in Yorkshire from 1965 to 1973, the last time to date that Sheffield has held this record. The tower contains one of the last working paternoster lifts in the world. |
| 4 | Royal Hallamshire Hospital | | 76 m (249 ft) | 17 | 1974 | Hospital | West End | Major general hospital operated by the Sheffield Teaching Hospitals NHS Foundation Trust, located in close proximity to the University of Sheffield on Glossop Road. Constructed in the 1970s as the combined replacement for two smaller and overcrowded city hospitals, the Sheffield Royal Hospital and Sheffield Royal Infirmary. |
| 5 | Sheffield Energy Recovery Facility | | 75 m (246 ft) | — | 2006 | Industrial | East End | Chimney of the new Energy from Waste incinerator managed by Veolia on behalf of Sheffield City Council, constructed on the site of the city's previous incinerator. The facility disposes of the city's waste, feeds electricity back into the National Grid and provides direct heating as part of a local district heating scheme. |
| 6= | Velocity Tower | | 66 m (217 ft) | 22 | 2009 | Residential | Sheffield City Centre | Originally planned to be constructed up to 36 storeys; the Great Recession interrupted construction at the 22nd floor, from which it never resumed. |
| 6= | New Era Square | | 66 m (217 ft) | 21 | 2018 | Residential | Sheffield City Centre | Centrepiece of Sheffield's new Chinatown development, located on the Inner Ring Road. |
| 8 | The Gate | | 64 m (210 ft) | 21 | 2020 | Residential | Sheffield City Centre | Construction of an office tower, then known as 1 Furnival Square, commenced in 2007; the Great Recession interrupted construction after only groundworks had been completed. The project was subsequently resurrected as a residential tower of identical design, which was completed in the late 2010s. |
| 9 | Sheffield Town Hall | | 61 m (200 ft) | 6 | 1896 | Government | Sheffield City Centre | Measured to the top of the Vulcan statue on its roof, the Renaissance Revival style clocktower of the Town Hall was the tallest building in Sheffield from 1896 until the construction of the Arts Tower in 1965. |
| 10 | Hollis Croft | | 60 m (200 ft) | 18 | 2019 | Residential | Sheffield City Centre | Student accommodation residential tower constructed on the site of abandoned light industry on the north-western side of the city centre. |
| 11 | Cathedral Church of St Marie | | 59 m (195 ft) | — | 1850 | Church | Sheffield City Centre | Former tallest building in Sheffield from 1850 until the construction of Sheffield Town Hall in 1896. |
| 12 | St John's Church | | 58 m (190 ft) | — | 1879 | Church | West End | |
| 13 | Tapton Hill transmitting station | | 57 m (187 ft) | — | 1967 | Broadcasting | West End | Broadcasting tower located in Crosspool, high up in the western hills of Sheffield, owned by Arqiva. The tower relays radio and television signals from the Emley Moor tower over the hills and valleys of Sheffield; it also transmits mobile phone signals, including the city's 5G network. |
| 14 | Vita Student Sheffield | | 56 m (184 ft) | 16 | 1972 | Residential | Sheffield City Centre | Originally known as Telephone House, constructed by the General Post Office (subsequently passing to British Telecom) to house their telecommunications offices and phone network equipment for the Sheffield area. Vacated by BT in 2012, the building was subsequently acquired by student accommodation provider Vita Student in 2014, who rebranded and refurbished the building to contain rental apartments and student amenities. |
| 15= | Queen Anne Court | | 55 m (180 ft) | 13 | 1958 | Residential | Gleadless Valley | One of the Herdings Twin Towers (on the right in the photo to the left), and one of many examples of brutalist apartment blocks in Sheffield constructed in the 1950s and 1960s. The roof height is 38 m (125 ft), rising to a total of 55 m (180 ft) when including antennas and other telecommunications equipment fitted to the rooftop spire due to the building's prominent location on a hilltop overlooking the south of Sheffield. Refurbished and cladded in 1998. |
| 15= | Rotherham Minster | | 55 m (180 ft) | — | 1540 | Church | Rotherham | Tallest building in the Sheffield City Region outside of Sheffield itself, and tallest building in Rotherham by extension. One of the tallest churches in Yorkshire. Extensively refurbished in 1873. |
| 17 | Redvers House | | 54 m (177 ft) | 14 | 1971 | Residential | Sheffield City Centre | Constructed as an office tower containing the offices of the social services department of Sheffield City Council and its predecessors, with a low-rise podium building at street level providing retail space. The building was refurbished and cladded in 2005. The council vacated Redvers House in 2014, and it was subsequently internally refurbished into a student accommodation building containing rental apartments. |
| 18 | Steelworks House | | 53 m (174 ft) | 17 | 2022 | Residential | Sheffield City Centre | Student accommodation encompassing the entire block between Rockingham Street, Portobello Street, Broad Lane and Newcastle Street which was formerly occupied by light industry and warehouses. The central tower fronting onto Rockingham Street rises to 53 m (174 ft), with mid-rise blocks surrounding it. |
| 19= | Cosmos | | 52 m (171 ft) | 17 | 2021 | Residential | Sheffield City Centre | Containing student accommodation, constructed at the head of Fitzwilliam Gate at Moorfoot in the city centre on a site previously occupied by a tiling store. |
| 19= | Doncaster Minster | | 52 m (171 ft) | — | 1858 | Church | Doncaster | Tallest building in Doncaster, and second tallest building in the Sheffield City Region outside of Sheffield itself. Constructed between 1854 and 1858 on the site of a previous church which had been destroyed by fire. |
| 21= | Knight House | | 51 m (167 ft) | 17 | 2019 | Residential | Sheffield City Centre | Part of a large redevelopment of student accommodation alongside the Inner Ring Road at Netherthorpe Road, close to the University of Sheffield Arts Tower and surrounding campus. |
| 21= | iQuarter | | 51 m (167 ft) | 16 | 2008 | Residential | Sheffield City Centre | Part of the North Bank redevelopment at the side of the River Don on Blonk Street. Formerly known as the Hancock & Lant Tower, named after the furniture store which previously occupied this site. Part of the furniture store's distinctive façade was incorporated into the street-level structure of iQuarter. |
| 23 | Pennine Five | | 50 m (160 ft) | 13 | 1975 | Office | Sheffield City Centre | Tallest remaining office building in Sheffield, formerly known as the Pennine Centre. Constructed for HSBC bank for use as their regional headquarters, which they occupied until relocating to a new-build site across the city centre at Charter Square in 2019. The complex was subsequently purchased by RBH Properties and refurbished. |

== Incomplete ==
=== Under construction ===
This lists buildings that are under construction in the Sheffield City Region and are planned to rise at least 50 metres (164 ft) tall. Under construction buildings that have already been topped out are listed above in the completed list.

The "Year" column indicates the year in which a building is scheduled to be completed.

| Rank | Name | Image | Height m (ft) | Floors | Year | Primary Use | Location | Notes |
|---|---|---|---|---|---|---|---|---|
| 1 | Code Sheffield | | 100m (330ft) | 32 | 2024 | Residential | Sheffield City Centre | Originally planned to be 117m and 38 floors, Code Sheffield would have been the tallest building in Sheffield and Yorkshire when originally proposed. Height has since been reduced to 100m and 32 stories. The centrepiece of a larger complex of mid-rise student accommodation buildings at the southern end of Rockingham Street, near Charter Square. Construction commenced in March 2022, but only groundworks complete as of June 2024. |
| 2 | Vista Sheffield | | 50 m (160 ft) | 16 | 2022 | Residential | Sheffield City Centre | Apartment block under construction on a narrow plot of land between Flat Street and Pond Street, next to Sheffield Interchange. The site was formerly occupied by Sheffield's Central Post Office, which was partially retained and refurbished into Sheffield Hallam University offices on the site adjacent to Vista Sheffield. Construction has stalled due to financial issues, as of June 2024. |

=== Approved ===
This lists buildings that are approved for construction (i.e. have obtained planning permission) in the Sheffield City Region and are planned to rise at least 50 metres (164 ft) tall.

| Rank | Name | Image | Height m (ft) | Floors | Year (est.) | Primary Use | Location | Notes |
|---|---|---|---|---|---|---|---|---|
| 1 | Kings Tower | | 120 m (394 ft) | 40 | 2023 | Residential | Sheffield City Centre | To be located on the High Street on a site currently occupied by empty retail premises (former Primark). Kings Tower, when built, will become Sheffield's third skyscraper and the tallest building in the city, overtaking Code Sheffield. Planned to be an apartment building with street-level retail. |
| 2 | The Meridian | | 75 m (246 ft) | 23 | — | Residential | Sheffield City Centre | Will be the tallest student accommodation building in Sheffield when built. The Meridian will be constructed at Granville Square on the Inner Ring Road, next to Grosvenors Casino, on a long-abandoned brownfield site previously occupied by the British Rail Sports Club. |
| 3 | Midcity Tower | | 65 m (213 ft) | 19 | — | Residential | Sheffield City Centre | Initially proposed in the late 2000s as 23 Furnival Gate, before being shelved as a result of the Great Recession. Updated plans on the same site subsequently re-submitted under the working title Midcity Tower. |

== Unbuilt ==
=== Unbuilt ===
This lists proposals for the construction of buildings in the Sheffield City Region that were planned to rise at least 50 metres (164 ft) tall, for which planning permission was rejected, expired or which were otherwise withdrawn. Some of these may still be constructed if the plans are resubmitted.

| Rank | Name | Image | Height m (ft) | Floors | Year (est.) | Primary Use | Location | Notes |
|---|---|---|---|---|---|---|---|---|
| 1 | Spital Tower | | 137 m (449 ft) | 28 | — | Residential | Sheffield City Centre | The tallest building ever submitted for planning permission in Sheffield. Would have been located at the junction of The Wicker and Spital Hill, next to the reconstructed Tesco supermarket. The site remains unoccupied as of 2022. |
| 2 | Cala Eclipse | | 92 m (302 ft) | 30 | — | Residential | Sheffield City Centre | Proposed for construction in 2004, however the developer Cala Developments subsequently went into administration. The project was subsequently taken on by Velocity Living, who redesigned the tower and constructed the shorter Velocity Tower on the site. |
| 3 | West Bar Block 10 | | 90 m (300 ft) | 26 | — | Residential | Sheffield City Centre | |
| 4 | West Bar Block 9 | | 84 m (276 ft) | 26 | — | Residential | Sheffield City Centre | |
| 5 | MoorSheffield Block 1 | | 79 m (259 ft) | 26 | — | Residential | Sheffield City Centre | Proposed redevelopment of the site of Chesham House along The Moor. This proposal was ultimately cancelled, falling victim to the Great Recession, and the site was subsequently redeveloped as The Light low-rise cinema and retail space. |
| 6 | Weston Tower | | 75 m (246 ft) | 23 | — | Residential | Sheffield City Centre | |
| 7 | Hanover Tower | | 72 m (236 ft) | 22 | — | Residential | Sheffield City Centre | |
| 8 | West Bar Block 1 | | 62 m (203 ft) | 14 | — | Office | Sheffield City Centre | |
| 9 | 3 St Paul's Place | | 59 m (194 ft) | 13 | — | Office | Sheffield City Centre | Part of the St Paul's Place redevelopment, 3 St Paul's Place was ultimately cancelled as a result of the Great Recession. The project was subsequently revived in the late 2010s, and a 42 m (138 ft) 10-storey office building was constructed on the same site. |
| 10 | West Bar Block 11 | | 53 m (174 ft) | 12 | — | Office | Sheffield City Centre | |
| 11 | Roscoe Road Development Block 9 | | 52 m (171 ft) | 18 | — | Residential | Sheffield City Centre | |

=== Demolished ===
This lists buildings and structures in the Sheffield City Region that were at least 50 metres (164 ft) tall and have since been demolished or dismantled.

An equals sign (=) following a rank indicates the same height between two or more buildings.

| Rank | Name | Image | Height m (ft) | Floors | Year Built | Year Demolished | Primary Use | Location | Notes |
|---|---|---|---|---|---|---|---|---|---|
| 1= | Tinsley Cooling Towers A & B | | 76 m (249 ft) | — | 1938 | 2008 | Industrial | Rotherham | Twin cooling towers of the former Blackburn Meadows Power Station that remained standing for 27 years after it was decommissioned in 1980, due to the difficulty in demolishing them with their proximity to the M1 motorway's Tinsley Viaduct. During this time they became an iconic symbol of Sheffield, and there was a campaign to save them and turn them into a giant art installation. However, they were ultimately demolished via controlled explosion on 27 August 2008. |
| 3 | Bernard Road Incinerator | | 75 m (246 ft) | — | 1938 | 2002 | Industrial | East End | The chimney of the original city incinerator, which was demolished and subsequently replaced by the Sheffield Energy Recovery Facility on the same site. |
| 4 | The Wheel of Sheffield | | 60 m (200 ft) | — | 2009 | 2010 | Tourism | Sheffield City Centre | Temporary observation wheel that was erected on Fargate in Sheffield city centre during the summer of 2009. Never intended to be a permanent installation, however its success saw its length of stay increased into the winter of 2010 before it was finally dismantled. Following the success of this initiative, smaller temporary ferris wheels are now erected at the same location during Sheffield's Christmas markets every winter. |
| 5 | Hyde Park Flats Block B | | 56 m (184 ft) | 19 | 1965 | 1993 | Residential | East End | Monolithic streets in the sky residential block, the largest of its kind ever to be constructed in Sheffield. Following a period of decline for the entire Hyde Park estate, the smaller two blocks were refurbished in the late 1980s to provide accommodation for the 1991 Summer Universiade held in Sheffield while the much larger Block B was demolished in 1993 as refurbishment was deemed economically unviable. |

== Timeline of tallest buildings ==
| Years tallest | Name | Use | Height | | Floors | Notes |
| Years tallest | Name | Use | metres | feet | Floors | Notes |
| 1430–1850 (420 years) | Sheffield Cathedral | Church | 49 | 161 | n/a | |
| 1850–1896 (46 years) | Cathedral Church of St Marie | Church | 59 | 195 | n/a | |
| 1896–1965 (69 years) | Sheffield Town Hall | Government | 61 | 200 | 6 | |
| 1965–2010 (45 years) | Arts Tower | University | 78 | 256 | 20 | |
| 2010–present (12 years) | St. Paul's Tower | Residential | 101 | 331 | 32 | |

== See also ==
- Brutalism in Sheffield, for a list of brutalism-era council apartment blocks in the city which do not make this list.
