= Dial =

Dial may refer to:

== Mechanical device ==
- Rotary dial, a device for the input of number(s) in telephones and similar devices
- Dialling, usually means to make a telephone call by turning the rotary dial or pressing the buttons
- Dial (measurement), a display device in radio, measuring instruments, etc.
- Mode dial, part of dSLR and SLR-like digital cameras

== DIAL ==
- DIAL, an acronym for differential absorption LIDAR
- DIAL, an acronym for Discovery and Launch, a network protocol
- DIAL, an acronym for Digital Impact Alliance
- Dunedin International Airport Limited, New Zealand
- Delhi International Airport (P) Limited, Delhi, India

== Other ==
- Dial (surname), people named Dial
- Dial Corporation, a consumer products company that is a wholly owned subsidiary of Henkel AG & Co. KGaA.
- Dial (soap), a brand of antibacterial soap and related products
- Dial, West Virginia, a community in the United States
- Dial (band), a Dutch progressive rock band
- Dial Press, a publishing house founded in 1923 by Lincoln MacVeagh
- The Dial, an American magazine published intermittently from 1840 to 1929
- Dial H for Hero, a comic book feature published by DC Comics
- A brand name for the barbiturate derivative Allobarbital
- -dial, the suffix for dialdehydes (a molecule with two aldehyde groups)
- 'dial.' can be an abbreviation for 'dialect'

== See also ==
- Dial House (disambiguation), various
- Dial Records (disambiguation), various
- A sundial or clock face
- Diol, a chemical containing two hydroxyl groups
- Diale, surname
