= Dial House =

Dial House may refer to:

== England ==
- Dial House, Essex
- Dial House, Sheffield, a Grade II listed building in Sheffield
- Dial House, Salford, a large telephone exchange building in Salford, Greater Manchester
- Dial House, Twickenham, a house owned by members of the Twining family (associated with Twining's tea) from about 1722 until 1889

== United States ==
- Dial-Goza House, Madison, Florida, listed on the NRHP in Florida
- Dial House (Meridian, Mississippi), listed on the NRHP in Mississippi
- Allen Dial House, Laurens, South Carolina, listed on the NRHP in South Carolina
- Dial-Williamson House, Marshall, Texas, listed on the NRHP in Texas

== See also ==
- Telephone House
