= Redvers =

Redvers may refer to:

== Places ==
- Redvers, Saskatchewan, a town in Canada

== People ==
- Redvers (given name), including a list of people with the name
- Kelvin Redvers, First Nations filmmaker
- Redvers family

== See also ==
- Redvers Airport, an abandoned airport in Saskatchewan, Canada
- Redvers House, an office building in Sheffield, England
