= Code Sheffield =

Residential skyscraper in Sheffield, England

- Artists impression of Code Sheffield
- Interactive map of the Code Sheffield area

General information
- Status: Under construction
- Type: Residential
- Location: Wellington Street, Sheffield City Centre, England
- Coordinates: 53.3782°N 1.4751°W
- Construction started: March 2022
- Cost: £100 million (planned)

Height
- Roof: 117 m (384 ft)

Technical details
- Floor count: 38

Design and construction
- Architect: Staniforth Architects
- Developer: Code Students

Other information
- Public transit access: B Y West Street

Code Sheffield is an under-construction skyscraper (Note: Under the Emporis Standards Committee, a skyscraper is defined as a multi-storey building which is at least 100 m (330 ft). Any building from 35 to 100 m (115 to 328 ft) tall is generally considered to be a high rise building.) located at the junction of Wellington Street and Rockingham Street in Sheffield, South Yorkshire. Construction commenced in March 2022 as part of the Heart of the City 2 redevelopment of this area of the city centre. With an originally planned height of 117 metres (384 ft) once completed, Code Sheffield would have overtaken both the St Paul's Tower as the tallest building in Sheffield and Altus House in Leeds as the tallest building in Yorkshire. However, due to rising costs the planned height of the building was reduced from 38 to 26 storeys.

== Site history ==
Code Sheffield occupies a plot of land between Wellington Street, Rockingham Street and Trafalgar Street on the western side of Sheffield City Centre, directly opposite Vita Student Sheffield across Rockingham Street. This site was initially occupied at the Rockingham Street end by Mount Tabor Chapel, a Wesleyan Methodist place of worship constructed in 1837 for the Reverend Robert Aitken; the remainder of the site consisted of a small steelworks surrounded by terraced workers' housing. The chapel was purchased by predecessors to the Wesleyan Reform Union in 1853 and a Sunday school was constructed on adjacent land. Plans were created to improve the chapel in the 1940s; however, these were interrupted by the outbreak of World War II and the subsequent destruction of much of the city centre in the Sheffield Blitz. Although the chapel building survived the Blitz, it did not remain in use as a religious building after the war and by 1948 the building was instead occupied by the Mount Tabor Printing Works.

The entire site, including the former chapel, Sunday school, steelworks and terraced housing, was demolished in 1962. Replacement buildings on the site were in the form of low-rise commercial and light industrial properties. A three-storey building known as Wellington House was constructed along the length of the Wellington Street frontage, containing a number of retail units which were last occupied by a stair lift and mobility scooter showroom. A telephone exchange was constructed at the Trafalgar Street end of the site, although this was soon replaced by the much larger premises at Telephone House a short distance away to the east; this building was last occupied by the local housing association offices. The Rockingham Street end of the site was occupied by a car repair garage, which was constructed in 1968 and in later years specialised in the repair of vehicle radiators.

The 1960s buildings on site all gradually fell into disuse as the primary retail activity in Sheffield city centre transferred to Fargate and The Moor from the 1980s onwards; the final property, the garage, was cleared of occupants by 2020. Demolition of all buildings and subsequent site clearance was carried out in early 2021 to make way for the construction of Code Sheffield.

== Planning and design ==
The first planning pre-application for Code Sheffield was submitted by developer Code Students in July 2019. The pre-application design consisted of twin towers, of 33 and 28 storeys, joined by a low-rise podium. This was subsequently amended in the full planning application submitted in October 2019, consisting of a single taller tower of 36 storeys adjoining two mid-rise sections of 17 and 12 storeys. The design of the tower was subsequently increased again to 38 storeys, which was granted planning permission from Sheffield City Council.

Originally, the central 38-storey tower was planned to reach a height of 117 metres (384 ft). The entire project would have contained up to 1,370 studio apartments, providing student accommodation. However, in early 2023 the plans for the building were scaled down due to rising costs. The height has been reduced from 38 to 26 storeys and the number of flats has fallen to 960.

There will also be provision of ground-floor retail units along street frontages, along with an on-site private cinema, gymnasium, common rooms and a roof terrace. The total construction cost is expected to be around £100 million (2022).

== Construction ==
Following the granting of planning permission for the project, construction was intended to commence in the spring of 2020; however, this was subsequently delayed indefinitely due to the COVID-19 pandemic. Construction of Code Sheffield ultimately commenced in late March 2022.

== Gallery ==
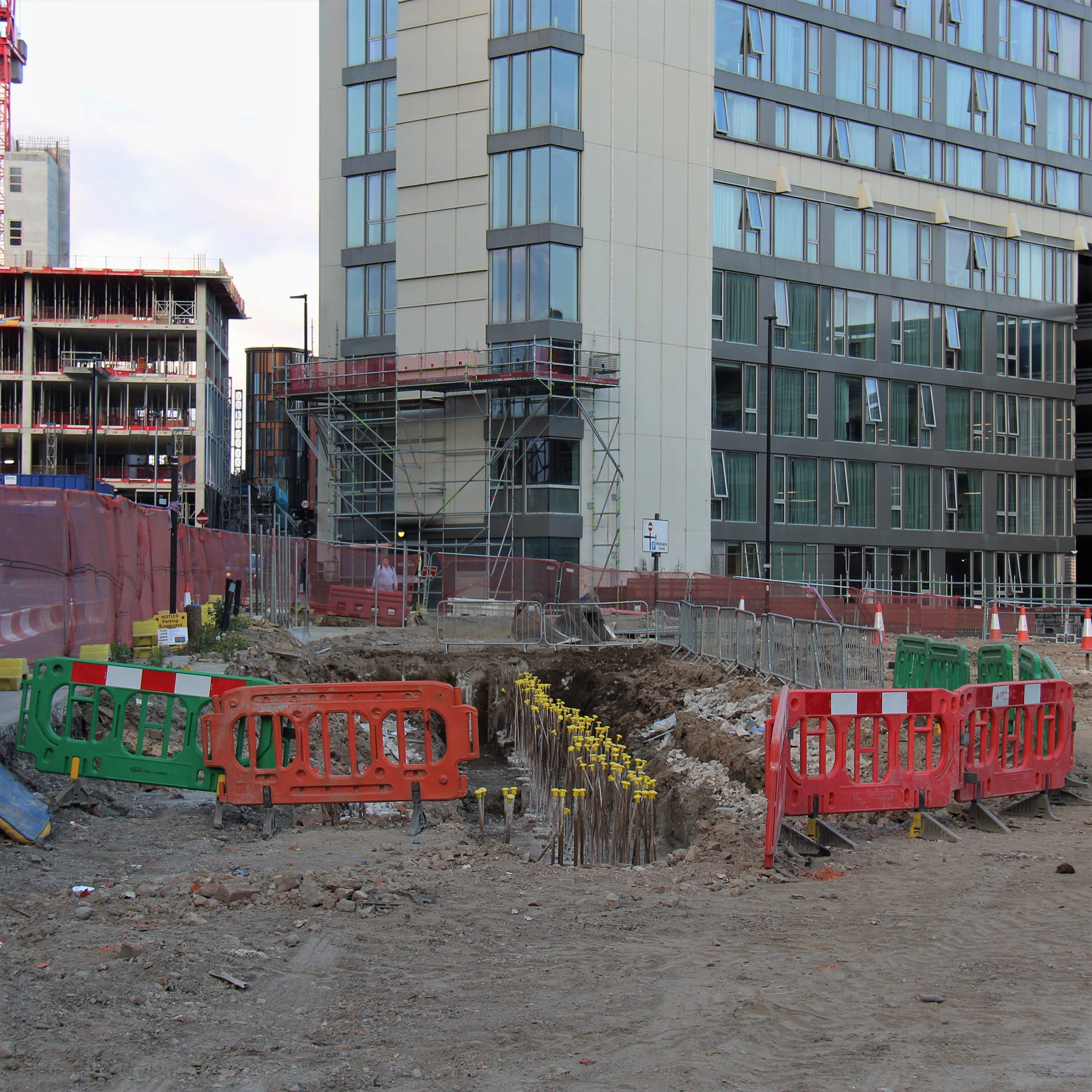
Groundworks for Code Sheffield under construction, April 2022
