= Diale =

Diale is a surname of South African origin.

== People with the surname ==
- Ardin Diale (born 1988), Filipino boxer
- Betty Diale, South African politician
- Kedibone Diale-Tlabela (born 1979), South African politician
- Mauro Luna Diale (born 1999), Argentine professional footballer
- Mmantsae Diale, South African physicist
- Nelson Diale (1936–2015), South African politician

== See also ==
- Dial
- Dale
