= Pinstone Street =

Street in Sheffield, England

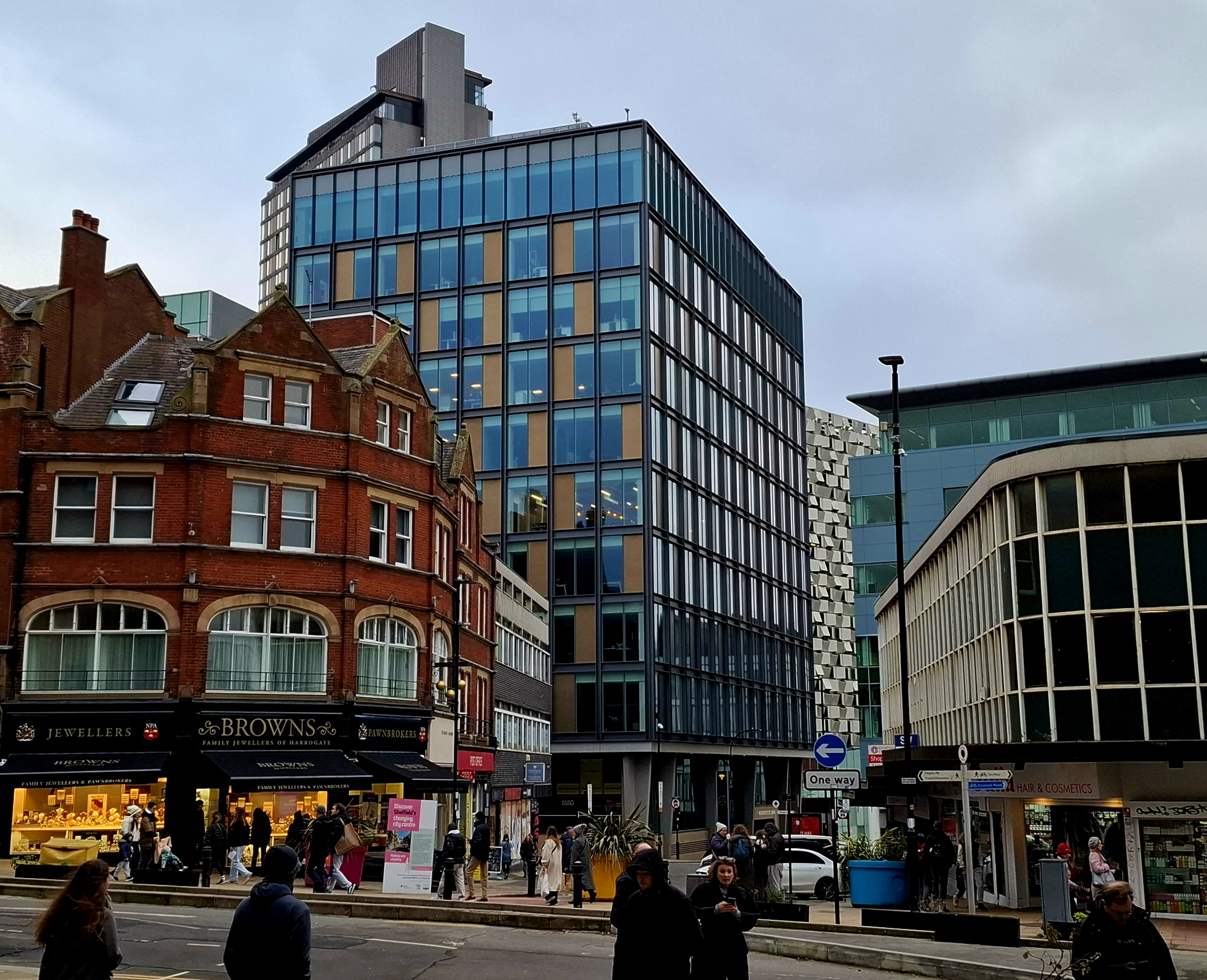
- A view of the street

- Location within Sheffield
- Former name: Pinstone Lane
- Length: 0.2 mi (0.32 km)
- Location: Sheffield, England
- Postal code: S1
- Coordinates: 53.379268°N 1.470590°W
- North end: Fargate / Leopold Street
- South end: Furnival Gate / The Moor

Pinstone Street is a part-pedestrianised road located in Sheffield, England. It connects the two main shopping areas of Fargate and The Moor in the centre of the city.

Originally called Pinstone Lane, its eastern side contains Sheffield Town Hall and the Peace Gardens. The western side of the street was to be redeveloped as part of the Sevenstone project which was postponed as a result of the Late-2000s recession and later cancelled in 2013. The scheme was later replaced by a new scheme named Heart of the City II which is currently underway.

== Redevelopment ==
=== Sevenstone ===
A proposal New Retail Quarter first developed in 2000 with Hammerson selected as the preferred developer in 2001. The scheme would have seen the refurbishment of several buildings on Pinstone Street. In October 2007, developers Hammerson unveiled the official marketing name for the New Retail Quarter as Sevenstone. However, the scheme was put on hold indefinitely in 2009. It was later announced in 2013 that the developer Hammerson had been axed from the scheme, putting an end to the Sevenstone proposals.

=== Heart of the City II ===
In 2018, a new redevelopment scheme named Heart of the City II was unveiled. It features new buildings, as well as several renovated historic buildings along Pinstone Street. The first phase involved the demolition of Grosvenor House which was replaced with a new building under the same name. This building houses HSBC as well as CMS. Clothing shops Monki and Weekday moved in to the building in 2019, taking on 2 units that front on to Pinstone Street.

== Buildings ==
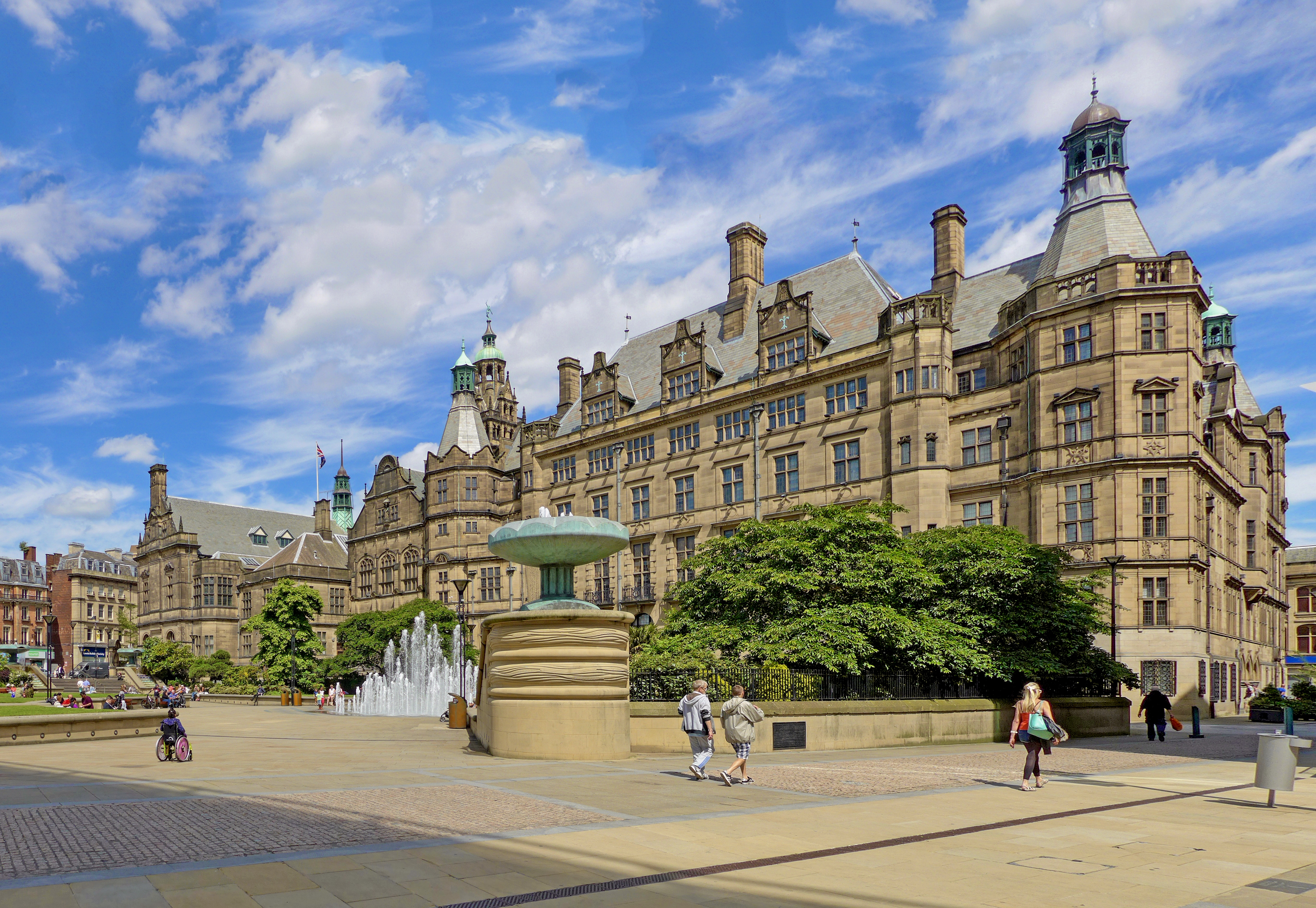
Sheffield Town Hall

Sheffield Town Hall, built between 1890 and 1897, is located on Pinstone Street and fronts on to the Peace Gardens, a public square. Many of the buildings on Pinstone Street date from the late Victorian era, such as Pinstone Street Chambers and the adjacent Salvation Army Citadel on Cross Burgess Street, which housed The Salvation Army. At the southern end, there are some newer buildings like Midcity House, built in the 1960s and currently earmarked for demolition, and Grosvenor House, completed in 2019 as part of the Heart of the City II scheme.
