= Atkinsons =

Department store in Sheffield, England

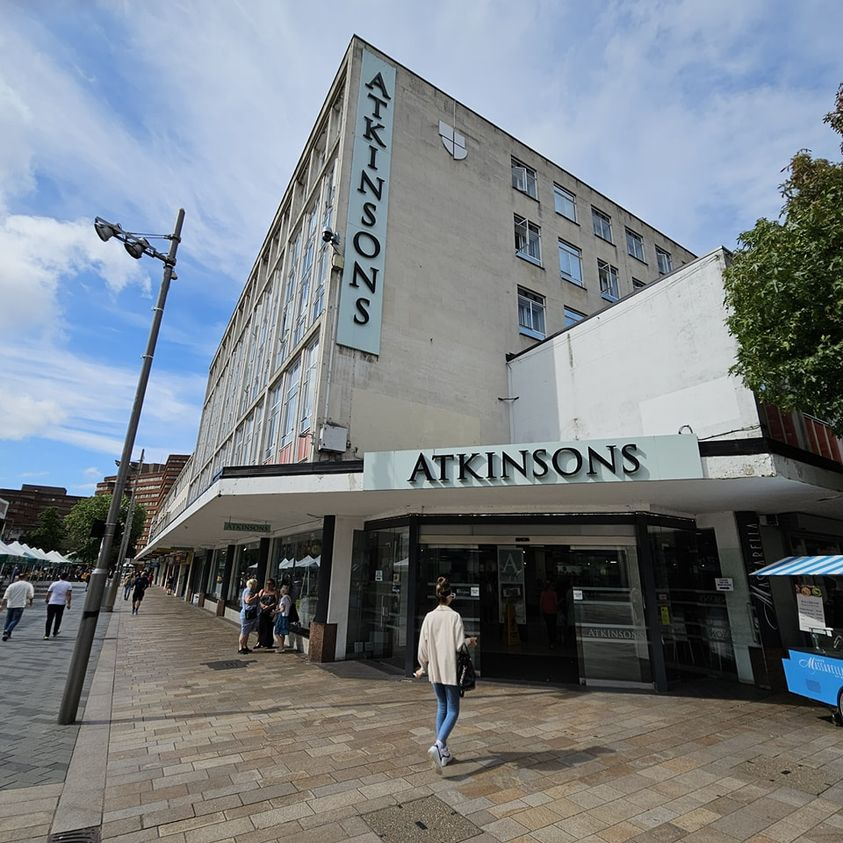
Aktinsons department store seen from the main Moor entrance.

Atkinsons is a family-owned department store located on The Moor in Sheffield, England. The store has been trading for around 150 years and sells a wide range of merchandise such as fashion and cosmetics, gifts, home furniture and domestic appliances. The complex includes a car park above (accessible via Charter Row) and bounded by eateries, a fitted furniture department, carpet department, Pavers Shoes and Grape Tree Foods concessions.

Old/former wordmark of Atkinsons

== History ==
John Atkinson arrived in Sheffield in 1865, and worked as an assistant at the Sheffield drapery Cole Brothers until he was 26. In 1872 he opened his own drapery in South Street, now known as The Moor, with the store specialising in hosiery, ribbons and lace.

The store started to expand by 1879 purchasing its first neighbouring store, and by 1890 had been transformed from a drapery into a department store. The business was so successful that the original shop units were demolished and replaced by a new building. John Atkinson's sons Harold Thomas Atkinson and John Walter Atkinson eventually took over the running of the business from their father, who died in 1929. During the 1930s Atkinsons' had an in-store zoo, which saw a baby crocodile escape. It was found dead in the lift shaft.

During the Second World War the store was completely destroyed by the Blitz in 1940. The business however improvised setting up its headquarters in St Judes Church in Milton Street, and opening departments across the city including a Kiosk outside the railway station and inside the semi-blitzed Central Cinema. The business lost all its ledgers during the blaze, however 80% of its credit accounts had been repaid within 3 months of the bombing. The business continued to be operated like this until 1960 when a new purpose-built store opened on The Moor.

In 1974, the first Sainsbury's supermarket in northern England opened inside Atkinsons. Sainsbury's operated within until moving next door separately in 2000. After the closures of both John Lewis and Debenhams in the city centre in 2021, Atkinsons remains the sole remaining in-town dpartment store in Sheffield.
