= Dial (measurement) =

Flat surface with numbers or other markings used for displaying a reading

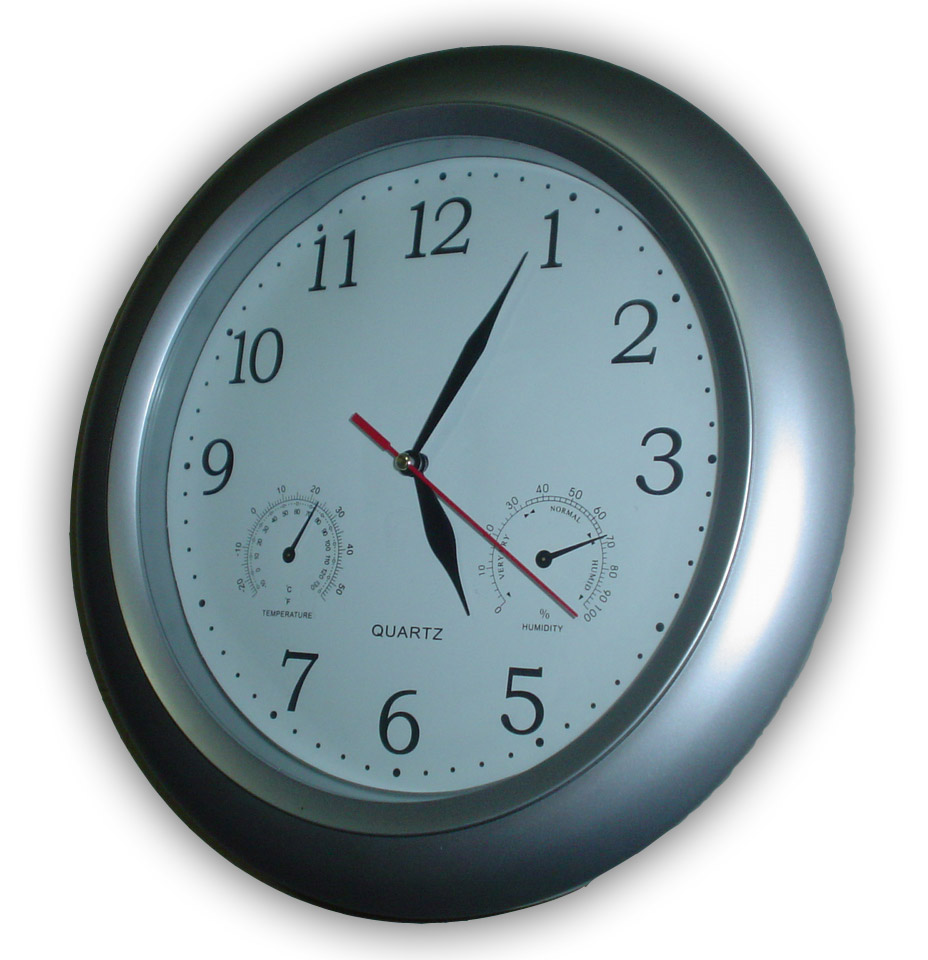
A wall clock with three dials

A dial is generally a flat surface, circular or rectangular, with numbers or similar markings on it, used for displaying the setting or output of a timepiece, radio, clock, watch, or measuring instrument. Many scientific and industrial instruments use dials with pointers to indicate physical properties. Examples include pressure and vacuum gauges, fluid-level gauges (for fuel, engine oil, and so on), voltmeters and ammeters, thermometers and hygrometers, speedometers and tachometers, and indicators (distance amplifying instruments).

Traditionally these have been mechanical devices, but with the advent of electronic displays, analog dials are often simulated from digital measurements.

The term may also refer to a movable control knob used to change the settings of the controlled instrument, for example, to change the frequency of the radio, or the desired temperature on a thermostat.

Styles of dials:

- Circular,
- Fixed pointer with moving scale,
- Fixed scale with moving dial.

Examples of dial usage:

- Pressure and vacuum gauges,
- Level gauges,
- Volt and current meters,
- Thermometers and thermostats (mechanical),
- Speedometers and tachometers.

Mirror dials are designed to reduce or eliminate the effect of parallax. They usually consist of a small mirrored strip running parallel to the graduations of the scale under the pointer. When the observer moves his position so that the pointer obscures the pointer's reflection in the mirror, an accurate reading may be taken.

== See also ==
- Dial (disambiguation)
- Sundial
