= Velocity Tower =

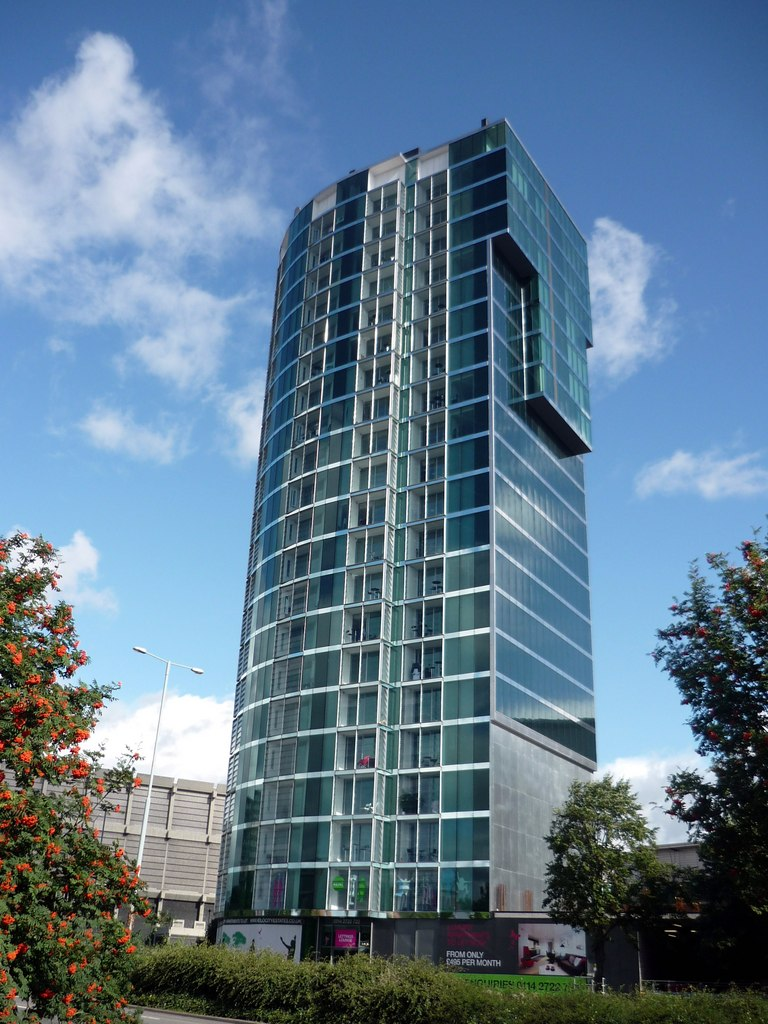
- A view of the tower

General information
- Status: Completed
- Type: Residential
- Location: The Moor Gateway, Sheffield, South Yorkshire
- Coordinates: 53.374164°N 1.478037°W
- Construction started: 2006
- Completed: 2009-2010
- Opening: December 2008
- Cost: Unknown to date
- Owner: Velocity Tower
- Operator: Velocity Management

Height
- Roof: 92 m (302 ft) (Estimate)
- Top floor: 88 m (289 ft) (Estimate)

Technical details
- Floor count: 30 (22 currently erected)

Design and construction
- Architect: AXIS Architecture
- Developer: Velocity Living

Velocity Tower is a mixed use development next to the Inner Ring Road in Sheffield City Centre, South Yorkshire, England, overlooking Ecclesall Road. The build is a continuation of a previous design to be built by Cala, titled 'Eclipse'.

== Cala Eclipse ==
The original plans for the site were for a single tower named Eclipse, the result of a project by Cala Developments and initially designed by Broadway Malyan. These designs called for a charcoal-grey cladded 22-story tower with a 12-story brickwork skin wing that was to provide 263 new apartments.

After successfully selling most of the apartments before construction began - Cala decided that the economic conditions were unfavourable and abandoned the scheme in 2005, causing concern among early investors by putting the land up for sale without a public announcement.

== Velocity Tower ==
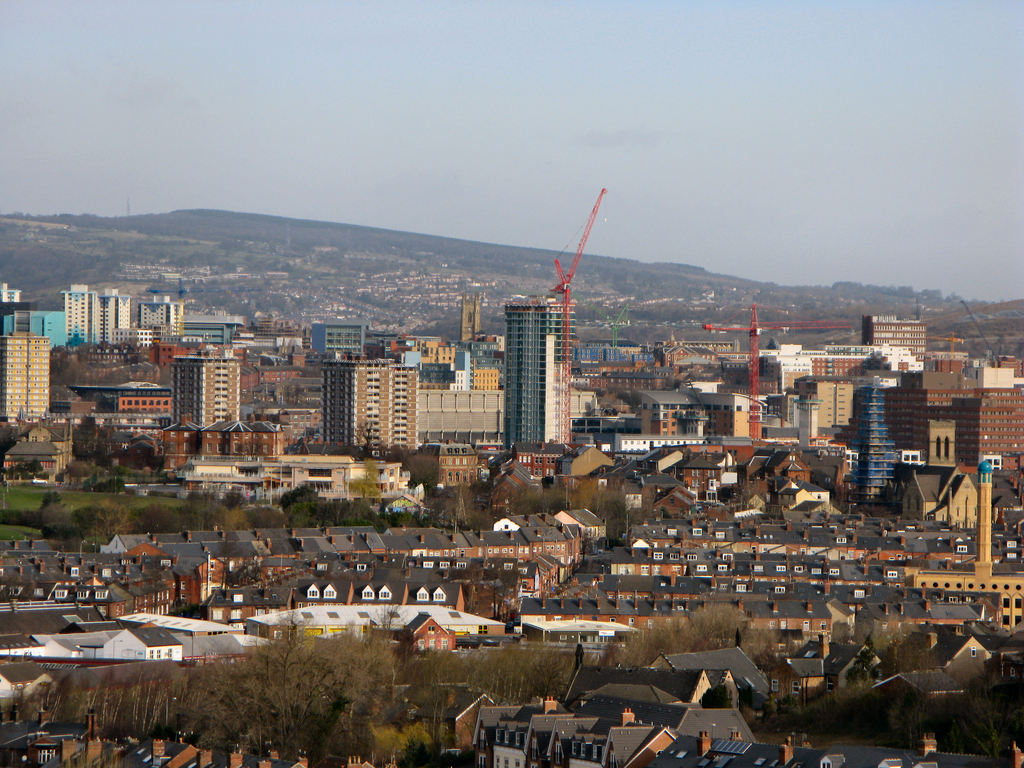
Skyline view of Sheffield with Velocity Tower in the centre

In 2007 it was eventually confirmed that Velocity Estates were to take over the project with some design changes from Sheffield-based architects AXIS Architecture. The altered design included a high-quality glass cladding façade to replace the previously proposed brickwork skin. A taller ground floor was also introduced, and a rooftop wind turbine array was added to improve the building's green credentials.

Construction started in 2007 under the agreed planning permission of the previous Eclipse building while a further application was submitted to alter the appearance of the tower and meet the City Council's design standards.

An application for the tower to go up to 36 storeys was submitted on 6 March 2008, but this was ultimately rejected by Sheffield Council stating that a 33-36 storey tower "would unacceptably break the city's skyline in important distant views".

A further revision to the plans was submitted limiting the building to a 30-storey tower and also lowering the west-facing wing of the building to 5 floors. To compensate for this reduction, however, the plans included the design of a second smaller tower at the far end of the wing, which would climb to 17 storeys. These plans were accepted by the council on 9 September 2008.

On 23 November 2008, the construction crane was removed from the Velocity Tower site and structural work was halted. The tower now stands at 22 storeys of the 30 storeys planned, with, as of August 2009, the second tower and wing an unfinished concrete frame of two storeys, and the grounds fenced off.

=== Grand opening ===
In December 2008, Velocity Tower - although unfinished - opened its doors to potential tenants.

The tower remained at 22 stories, with the planned 30 story height never pursued.
