= Control knob =

Rotary device used to operate mechanical or electrical device system

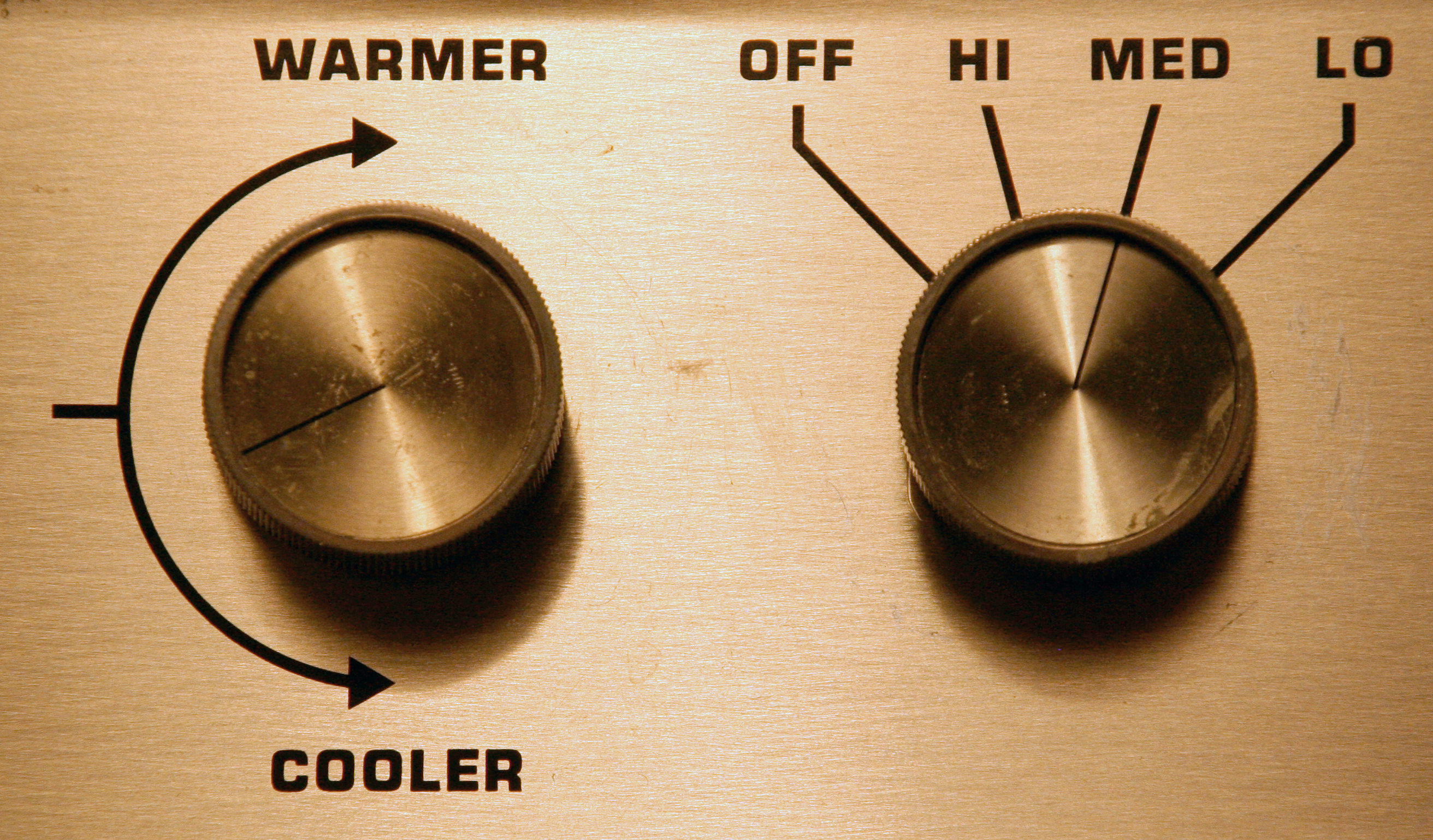
Two control knobs for a heating/cooling system. The left knob controls the temperature while the right controls the fan speed.

A control knob is a rotary device used to provide manual input adjustments to a mechanical/electrical system when grasped and turned by a human operator, so that differing extent of knob rotation corresponds to different desired input. Control knobs are a simpler type of input hardware and one of the most common components in control systems, and are found on all sorts of devices from taps and gas stoves to optical microscopes, potentiometers, radio tuners and digital cameras, as well as in aircraft cockpits.

== Operation ==
A control knob works by turning a shaft which connects to the component which produces the actual input. Common control components used include potentiometers, variable capacitors, and rotary switches. An example where the knob does not produce a variation in an electrical signal may be found in many toasters, where the darkness knob moves the thermostat in such a way as to change the temperature at which it opens and releases the cooked toast. Some similar controls produce similar inputs using different geometry; for example, the knob may be replaced by a lever which is moved through an angle. Another example is the sliding controls which frequently replace knobs as level controls in audio equipment.

== Feedback ==
The use of knobs is an important aspect of the design of user interfaces in these devices. Particular attention needs to be paid to the feedback to the operator from the adjustments being made. The use of a pointer on the knob in conjunction with a scale assists in producing repeatable settings; in other cases there may be a dial or other indicator which is either mechanically linked the knob's rotation (as in many older radio tuners) or which reports the behavior being controlled.

== Examples ==
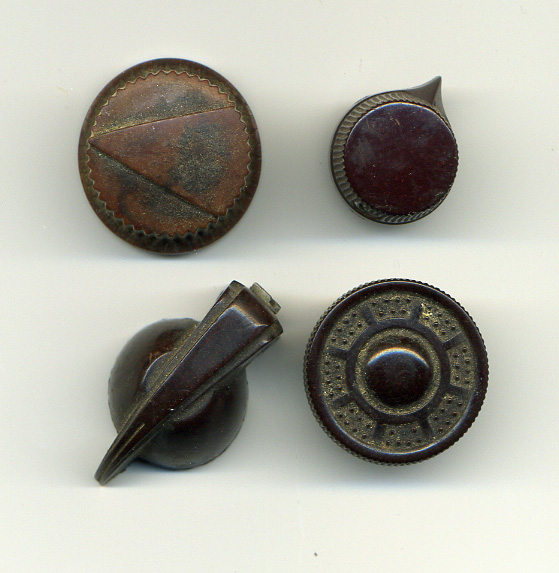
various knobs, three of which incorporate pointers to indicate setting

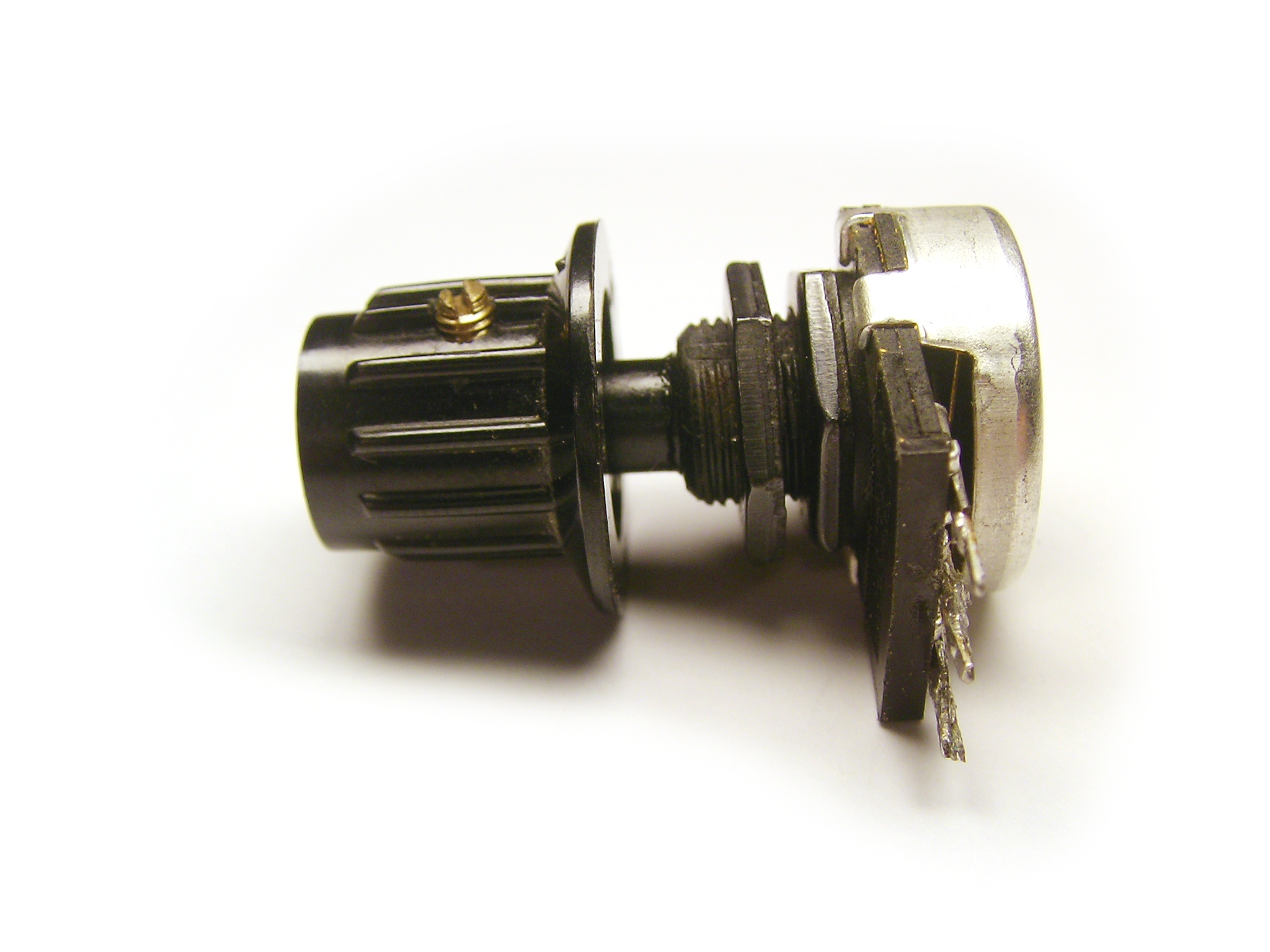
the knob on the left turns the shaft of a potentiometer

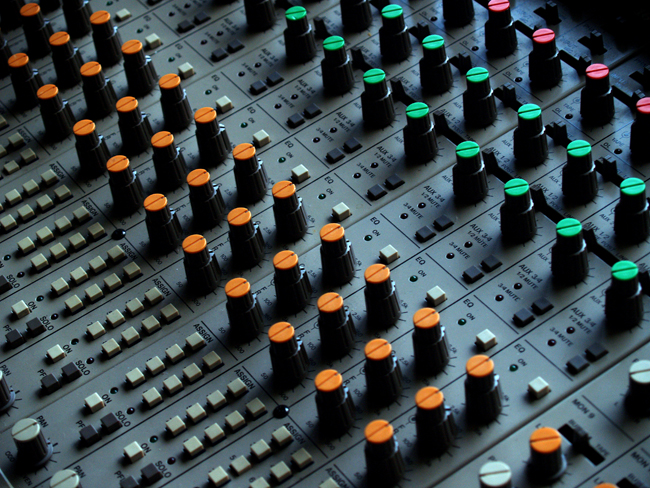
a control panel with knobs color-coded according to function

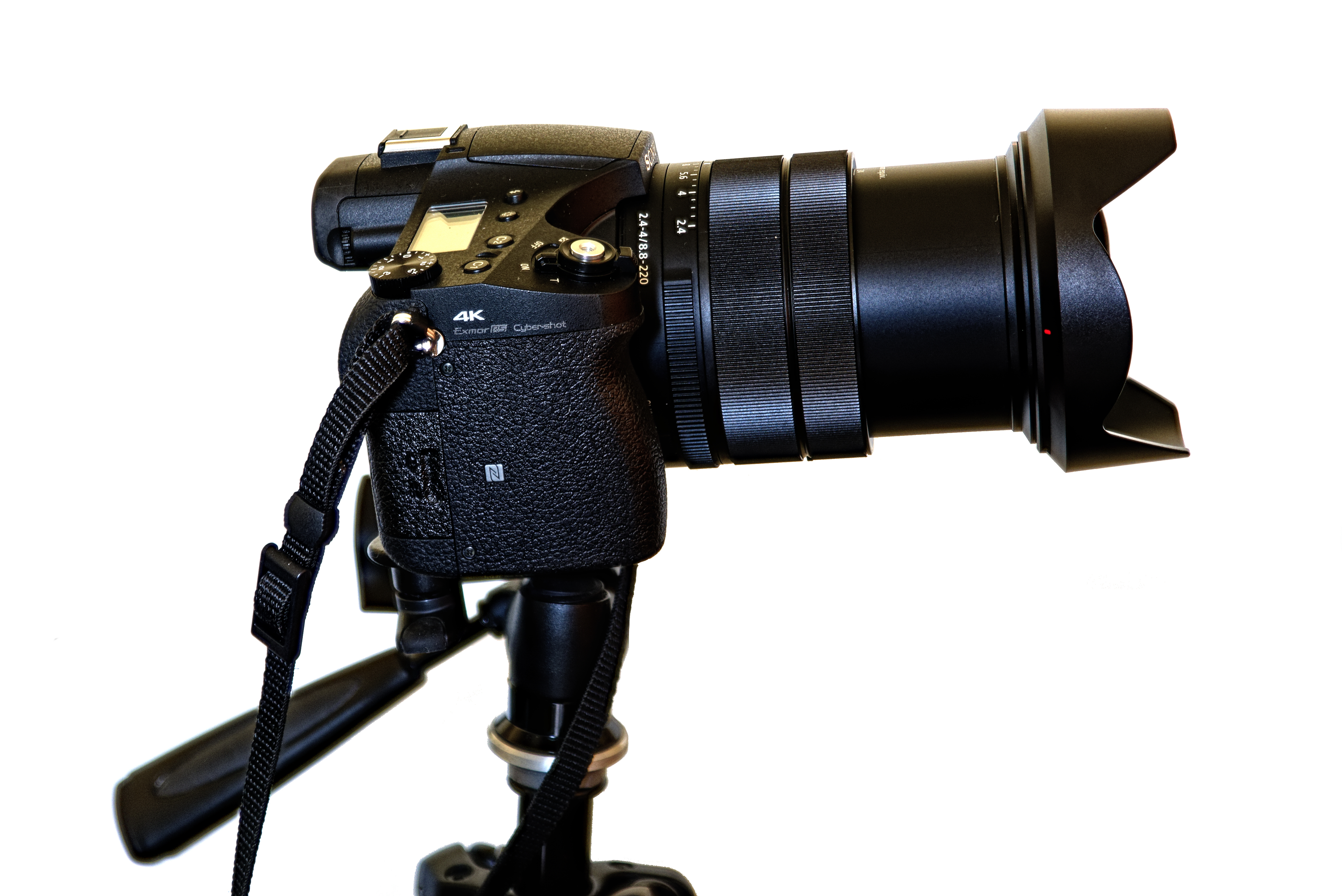
digital camera lens with two control knobs
