= Manpower Services Commission =

Former non-departmental public body in the United Kingdom

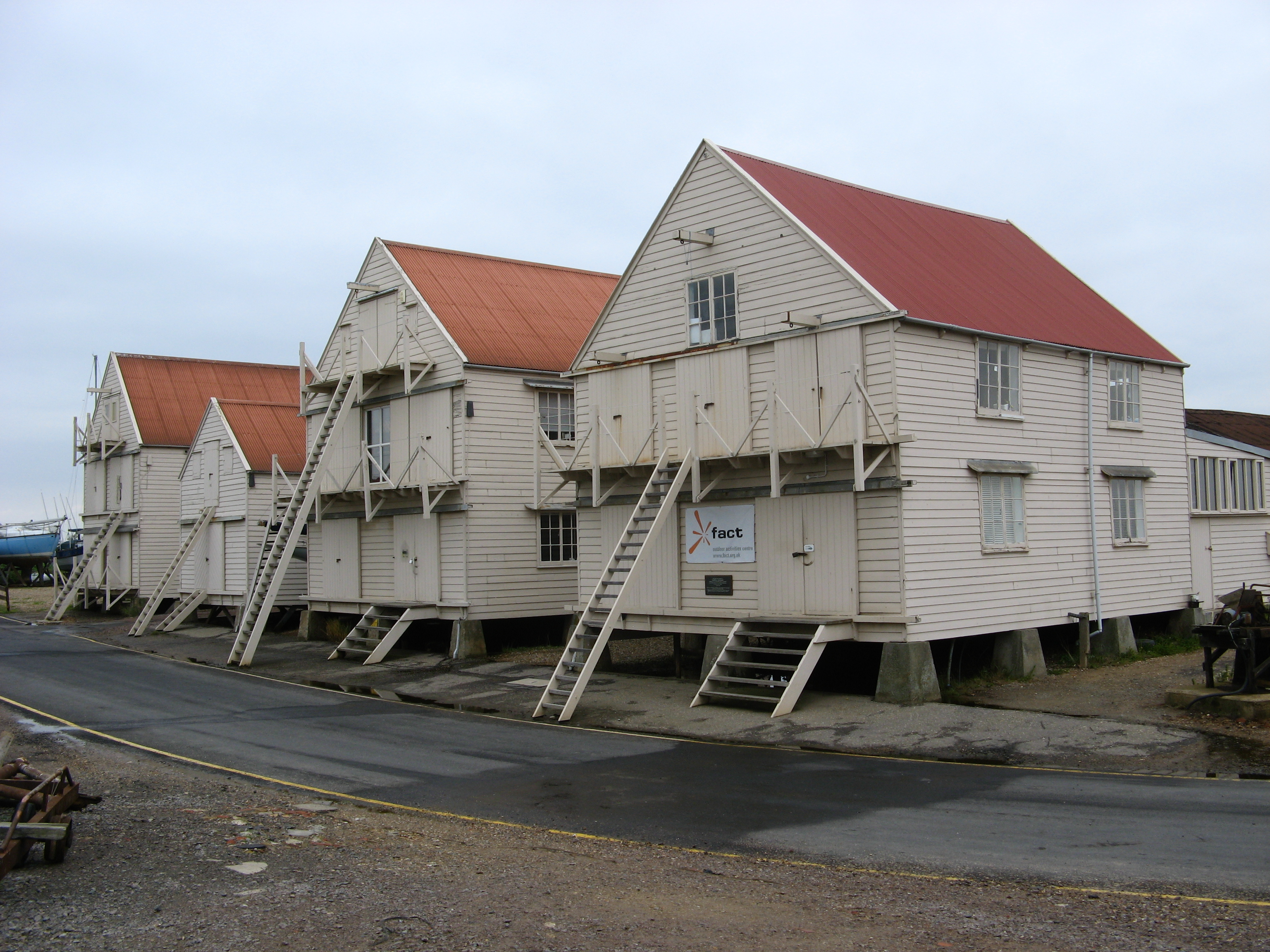
Yacht stores, in Tollesbury, Essex, renovated by a Manpower Services Commission project

The Manpower Services Commission (MSC) was a non-departmental public body of the Department of Employment in the United Kingdom created by Edward Heath's Conservative Government on 1 January 1974 under the terms of the Employment and Training Act 1973. The MSC had a remit to co-ordinate employment and training services in the UK through a ten-member commission drawn from industry, trade unions, local authorities and education interests. This was an example of the contemporary corporatist influence on British economic policy.

== MSC agencies ==
The MSC originally had two executive agencies, the Employment Services Agency and the Training Services Agency. A third agency the Special Programmes Division was established, the body was led by Geoffrey Holland of the Policy and Planning Division under the overall management of Sir John Cassells.

The Policy and Planning Division was initially based in Selkirk House, High Holborn, London and later moved to the Moorfoot Building in Sheffield. At Selkirk House a team of policy makers took responsibility for putting Geoffrey Holland's Young People and Work report of 1977 which created the Youth Opportunities Programme (YOP).

== Youth Opportunities Programme ==
The Youth Opportunities Programme and the Job Creation Programme were intended to ameliorate the problems facing the young and not-so-young workers following high unemployment in the UK during the early to mid-1970s. "You can't get a job without experience, and you can't get experience without a job" was a catch phrase of the time.

YOP had its critics and bad press, especially for its work experience programme where several companies were accused of manipulating the system to get their 'free boy or girl' for six months. However, some notable successes included the development of the information technology centres which started in Notting Hill, London, giving young, disaffected youths the chance to explore the budding information technology industry. Many young people were initially attracted by the electronics side, especially with music sound systems being popular at the time. They were encouraged to venture into computer programming by gaming first, then understanding how the programmes worked and could be improved.

== Training Schemes ==
The MSC also created the Training Opportunities Scheme, which in 1985–6 gave way to the Job Training Programme.

The MSC was to become closely associated with its management of the Youth Training Scheme and various other training programmes intended to help alleviate the high levels of unemployment in the 1980s. After 1987, the MSC lost functions and was briefly re-branded the Training Agency, before being replaced by a network of 72 training and enterprise councils.

== Organisation structure ==
The board of the Manpower Services Commission was constituted under Section 1 and Schedule 1 of the Employment and Training Act 1973. It comprised ten members appointed by the Secretary of State:

- A chairman
- 3 members from organisations representing employers;
- 3 members from organisations representing employees;
- 2 members from organisations representing local authorities;
- 1 member from organisations concerned with education.

The chairman of the Manpower Services Commission through its operating life were:

- Sir Denis Barnes (January 1974 – April 1976)
- Sir Richard O’Brien (April 1976 – April 1982)
- David Young, Baron Young of Graffam (April 1982 – September 1984)
- Sir Bryan Nicholson (September 1984 – October 1987)

The MSC was renamed the Training Commission in October 1987, its chairman was Sir James Munn.
