= The Gate, Sheffield =

The Gate
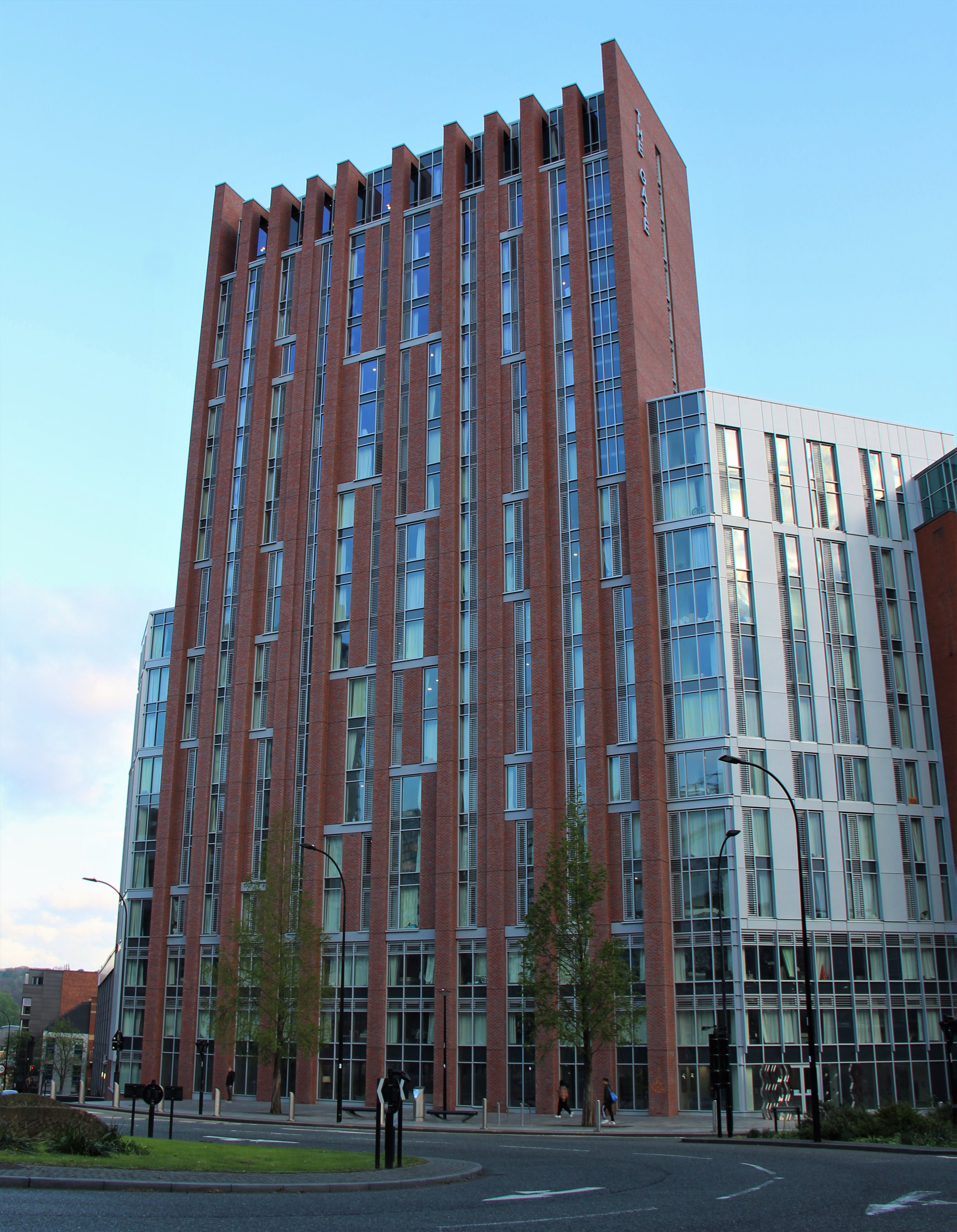
- The Gate in 2022
- Interactive map of the The Gate area
- Former names: 1 Furnival Square (during planning)

General information
- Status: Completed
- Type: Residential, Hotel
- Location: Sheffield, England
- Coordinates: 53.377°N 1.470°W
- Construction started: 2007
- Opening: 2020

Height
- Roof: 64 m (210 ft)

Technical details
- Floor count: 21
- Floor area: 12,158 m^{2} (130,870 sq ft)

Design and construction
- Architect: Urban Innovations
- Developer: McAleer and Rushe Group

The Gate is a residential tower located at 1 Eyre Street in Sheffield, England. Plans were submitted in 2006 and accepted that year. Construction started in 2007, however the project was placed on hold in January 2009 as a result of the Great Recession. Construction resumed in 2017; The Gate was topped out in 2019, and completed in the summer of 2020.

Originally proposed as an office tower known as 1 Furnival Square, the tower was proposed as a single project also encompassing a 43 metres (141 ft) Jurys Inn hotel adjacent, with the two towers sharing ground floor retail space. Construction of the 11-storey hotel continued as a separate project after the office tower was placed on hold, and Jurys Inn Sheffield opened in 2010. The tower was subsequently revived as a residential tower containing university student accommodation, renamed The Gate.

The Gate consists of 21 floors taking it to a height of 64 metres (210 ft), making it Sheffield's seventh-tallest building. It has four lifts.
