= Redvers (given name) =

Redvers is a given name. Notable people with the name include:

- Redvers Buller (1839–1908), British army officer
- Redvers Kyle (1929–2015), British broadcaster
- Redvers Opie (1900–1984), British economist
- Redvers Prior (1893–1964), British naval officer and politician
- Redvers Sangoe (1936–1964), Welsh boxer
- Redvers Smith (1903–?), English professional footballer

== See also ==
- Redvers (disambiguation)
