= Moorfoot Building =

Office building in Sheffield, England

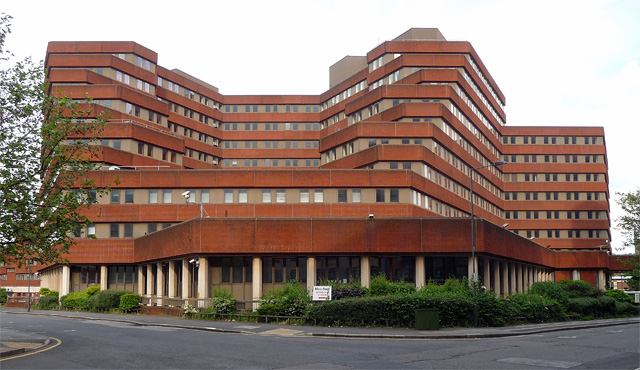
- A view of the building

- Location within South Yorkshire

General information
- Status: Completed
- Type: Office
- Location: Sheffield, England
- Coordinates: 53.3742°N 1.4756°W
- Opening: July 1981
- Owner: Sheffield City Council

Technical details
- Floor count: 11 in tallest wing
- Floor area: 27,600 m^{2} (297,000 sq ft)
- Lifts/elevators: 6 from main reception area and 2 passenger / 1 goods in the North Wing
- Grounds: 1.1 hectares (2.7 acres)

The Moorfoot Building is a large office building in Sheffield, South Yorkshire, England, in the form of a step pyramid. It is located at the foot of The Moor (a pedestrianised shopping street), close to the Sheffield Inner Ring Road. Before its construction, The Moor continued across St Mary's Gate onto London Road. The building opened in July 1981.

== Design and construction ==
The building is based around three wings; the East Wing, the West Wing and the North Wing, and floors were originally numbered in the US style with the ground floor as Floor 1 or First Floor. Amongst the facilities originally constructed in the building was a staff restaurant and bar on Floor 2 and a full sized squash court in the basement.

As the construction of the building across The Moor effectively severed the traditional access to The Moor from London Road, to satisfy planning conditions, Moorfoot was designed to allow pedestrian access 'through' the building. The pedestrian walkway began with an elevated ramp near the corner of Young Street and South Lane, before proceeding via a tunnel through the building (including a section with a glazed roof) as the route crossed the base of an open area in the East Wing. The walkway exited the building above the car park and used sloping ramps to bring the route back to ground level on The Moor near the entrance to the building. The route was dependent on the completion of a further planned development (where the Premier Inn hotel is currently located) and as this development did not take place, the route was never completed or opened to the public.

== History ==
The building was previously known as the Manpower Services Commission Building and was the headquarters of that agency. It later contained offices belonging to several departments of the British Government, namely:

- Training Commission
- Training Agency
- Department of Employment
- Department for Children, Schools and Families
- Department for Innovation, Universities and Skills
- Department for Work and Pensions
- Home Office

The building was purchased by Sheffield City Council in the late 2000s, with the government departments as sitting tenants pending their relocation. In 2010 the British Government vacated the property, and were replaced by the council's Children, Young Peoples and Families Directorate and Central Finance Service.

It was planned that the building would eventually be demolished and the site form part of a new business district.

In the summer of 2011, many departments from Sheffield Town Hall moved into the Moorfoot Building. In January 2013, Henry Boot Construction announced the award of a contract to refurbish a large part of the building for Sheffield City Council. The multimillion-pound project was to deliver vital services upgrades and a refurbishment to the majority of the building in order to provide office space for council employees.

Following the COVID-19 pandemic and the council's adoption of hybrid working (a hybrid of working from home and working from offices) for its office based staff, they announced plans to downsize their office estate, and by the end of 2023 relocating staff based at the Moorfoot building to other parts of the estate including city centre locations including Sheffield Town Hall and Howden House and in the city's suburbs at Manor Lane Depot and some Area Housing Offices.
