= Sheffield Energy Recovery Facility =

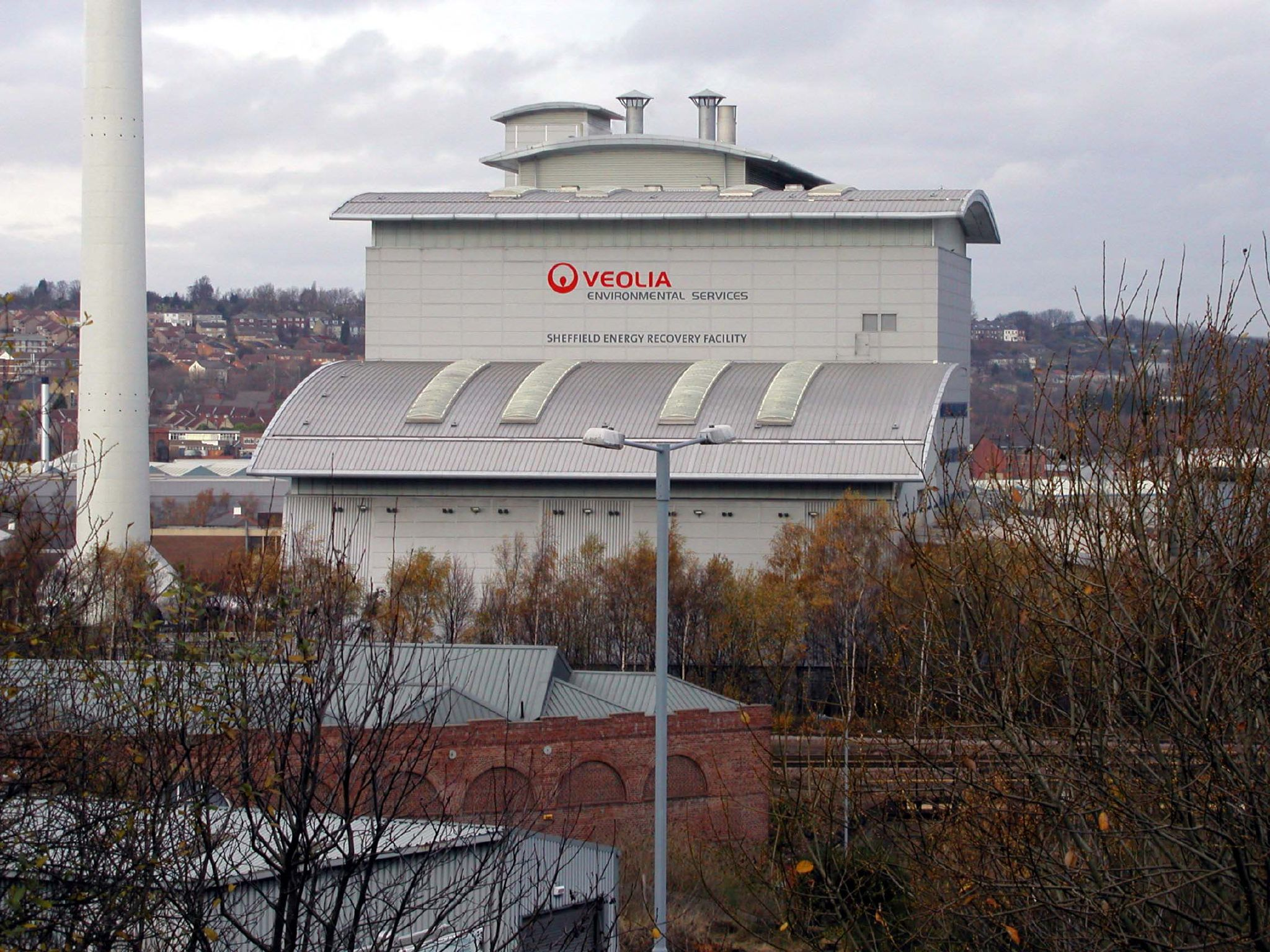
- Sheffield Energy Recovery Facility from Cricket Inn Road in 2007
- Official name: Sheffield Energy from Waste Plant
- Country: England
- Location: South Yorkshire
- Coordinates: 53.3866°N 1.4511°W
- Operator: Veolia Environmental Services

Thermal power station
- Primary fuel: Waste

External links
- Commons: Related media on Commons

The Sheffield Energy Recovery Facility, also known as the Energy from Waste Plant, is a modern incinerator which treats Sheffield's household waste. It is notable as it not only provides electricity from the combustion of waste but also supplies heat to a local district heating scheme, making it one of the most advanced, energy efficient incineration plants in the UK. In 2004, the district heating network prevented 15,108 tonnes of CO_{2} from being released from buildings across the city, compared to energy derived from fossil fuels. The incinerator is a 'static asset' owned by Sheffield City Council and operated by Veolia Environmental Services under a 35 year integrated waste management contract (IWMC)/PFI contract.

== The process ==
Waste from households, Local Authority services and some local businesses is brought to the Energy Recovery Facility. It is tipped into a waste storage bunker. From the bunker the waste is lifted into a feed hopper by an overhead crane at a rate of 28 tonnes per hour.

The hopper feeds the waste into a single incineration unit where it is burned in excess of 850 °C. A large boiler located above the incineration unit is heated to produce superheated steam at 400 °C. A condensing steam turbine uses this steam to generate electricity for the National Grid and produce hot water for the District Energy network.

Urea is introduced into the furnace to treat NOx (Oxides of Nitrogen) emissions. Lime and activated carbon is introduced to neutralise the acidity of the flue gas and adsorb other pollutants. The cooled flue gases pass through a filter house where the particulate (dust) is captured by 1760 filters and stored in a silo for separate disposal later. Cleaned gases are then released through the chimney. These gases are continuously monitored to ensure they meet strict environmental regulations.

An electromagnetic overband separator removes metal from the ash. The metal is delivered to a local company for recycling. Ash from the incineration process goes into a bunker before being taken to a process plant for treatment and recycled into aggregate for the construction industry.

== Controversies ==
In 2001 ownership of the original incinerator was transferred to Onyx UK (now Veolia Environmental Services) from Sheffield City Council. Earlier that year the old incinerator ceased operations after protests by the public and Greenpeace. At the time Greenpeace declared it the 'worst incinerator in England'. A new modern plant was commissioned in 2006 bringing it into line with the Waste Incineration Directive, with strict environmental standards.

Sheffield Green Party have stated that the new incinerator is still responsible for 31,308 tonnes of greenhouse gas emissions per annum that would be prevented were the waste to be recycled, even taking into account that the incinerator recovers heat and power. As the UK Government's new waste strategy appears to support recycling and anaerobic digestion over Combined Heat and Power incineration for most waste streams, the role of the incinerator may have to change.

In January 2012, Public Health England commissioned a research study to investigate a potential link between incinerator emissions and health outcomes to the people within the local population. The Sheffield Energy Recovery Facility was amongst the 22 incinerators being examined as part of this study.

In 2006 when the new Energy Recovery Facility (ERF) was finally fully on-stream, a report was commissioned by Veolia Environmental Services (VES) that concluded the refuse available to be recovered to the ERF within the Sheffield boundary was considerably lower than that which would be needed to sustain the ERF's required refuse input when other factors such as competition from other waste management services to private businesses was considered. A planning application was then posed to Sheffield City Council in 2012 to allow waste from outside of the Sheffield Waste Disposal Authority Area, and to widen the catchment area. By 2015 Veolia was processing 225,000 tonnes of refuse per annum through the Energy Recovery Facility and proceeded to make a further application to Sheffield City Council to increase this to 245,000 tonnes, This was conditionally granted in 2016. Sheffield 'Friends of the Earth' have complained and campaigned about the growth of the catchment area and the amount that is being incinerated.

In 2017 details of an internal Veolia management email were leaked by the GMB union which alleged that recyclable waste was being diverted from the network of Sheffield household waste recycling centres around the city, and had been doing so since 2011. Veolia was accused of diverting the waste to try to plug a 50,000 tonne shortfall of waste needed to run the incinerator to fulfil its obligations to provide district heating for the city, despite Environment Agency regulations demanding that companies must recycle as much as they can. The GMB union was angered as GMB member workers at Veolias' recycling plant are given a bonus if recycling targets are met, and this task is made more difficult if recyclables are being diverted and incinerated. Veolia denies this and refuted the accusations.

In 2017 Sheffield City Council decided to review and terminate the original terms of the 35 year PFI contract. The terms of the original 2001 contract were given a long-length due to acknowledging the investment that was needed to bring the original incinerator up to modern environmental standards and it was understood that some of this investment would need to be provided up-front by Onyx/Veolia as it was cost-prohibitive for the council to finance the incinerator's upgrade alone within allocated budgets. The cost of this expenditure would subsequently be recouped over the time of the contract in Veolias' yearly profits. The original terms didn't envisage the expansion of Veolia's waste catchment area. The council wanted to try to leverage more of the profits of the Energy Recovery Facility under renegotiated terms, and to try to reduce other expenses related to waste collection. The Integrated Waste Management contract was subsequently renegotiated and re-signed with Veolia in December 2017 in order to reduce the ongoing costs to Sheffield City Council. As part of the renegotiation, other side-benefits have become apparent for Veolia with some of the fleet network of refuse vehicles which collect the waste supply of residents that feed the Energy Recovery Facility being upgraded and converted to Electric/Hybrid.

== See also ==
- List of incinerators in the United Kingdom
