= Dial-Goza House =

Historic house in Florida, United States

- U.S. National Register of Historic Places
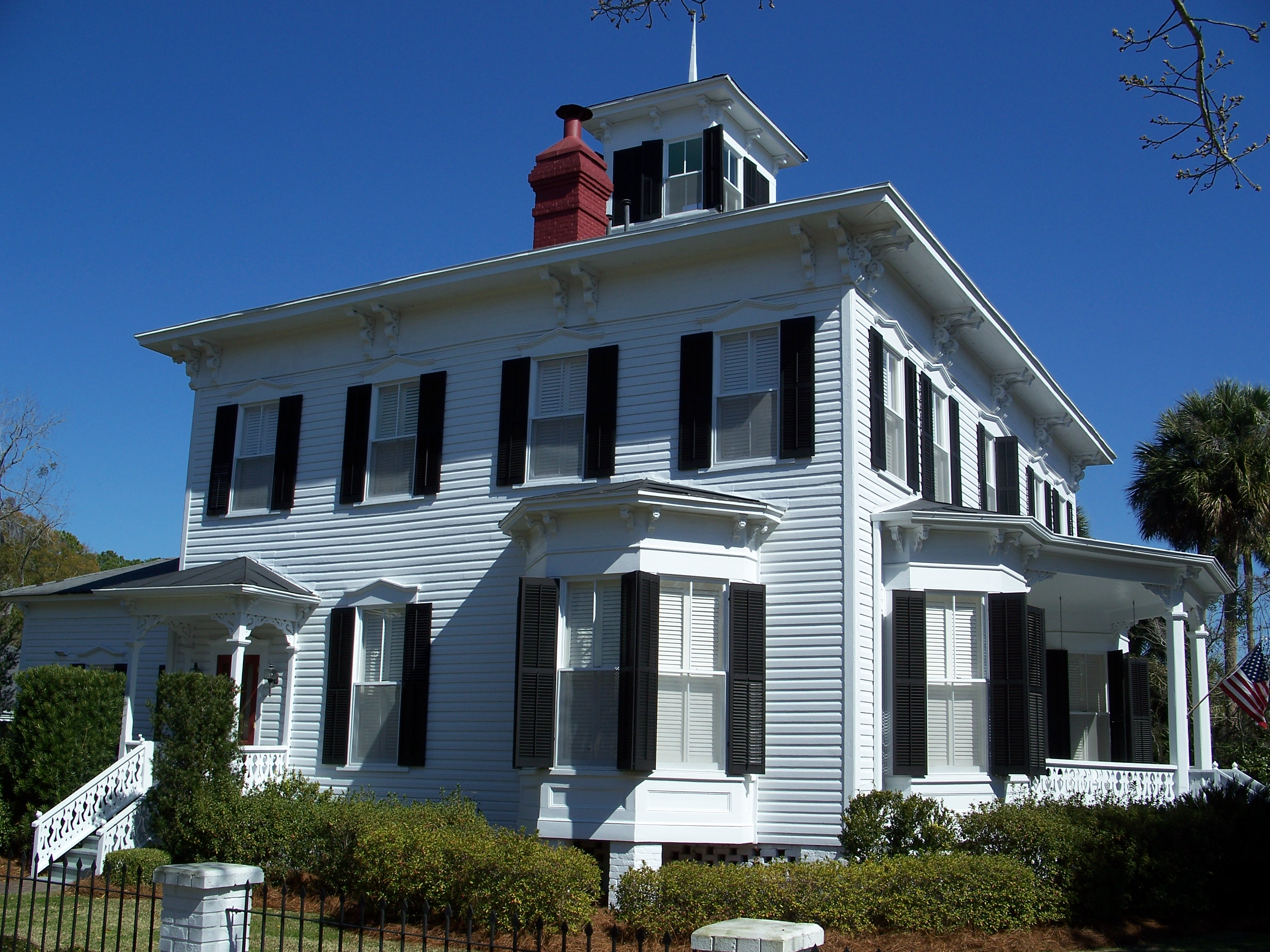

- Location within Florida Location within the United States
- Location: Madison, Florida
- Coordinates: 30°28′13″N 83°24′46″W
- Built: c. 1880
- Architectural style: Victorian Italianate
- NRHP reference No.: 73000585
- Added to NRHP: July 24, 1973

The Dial-Goza House (also known as the William H. Dial House) is a historic U.S. house in Madison, Florida. It is located at 105 Northeast Marion Street. On July 24, 1973, it was added to the U.S. National Register of Historic Places.

== Gallery ==
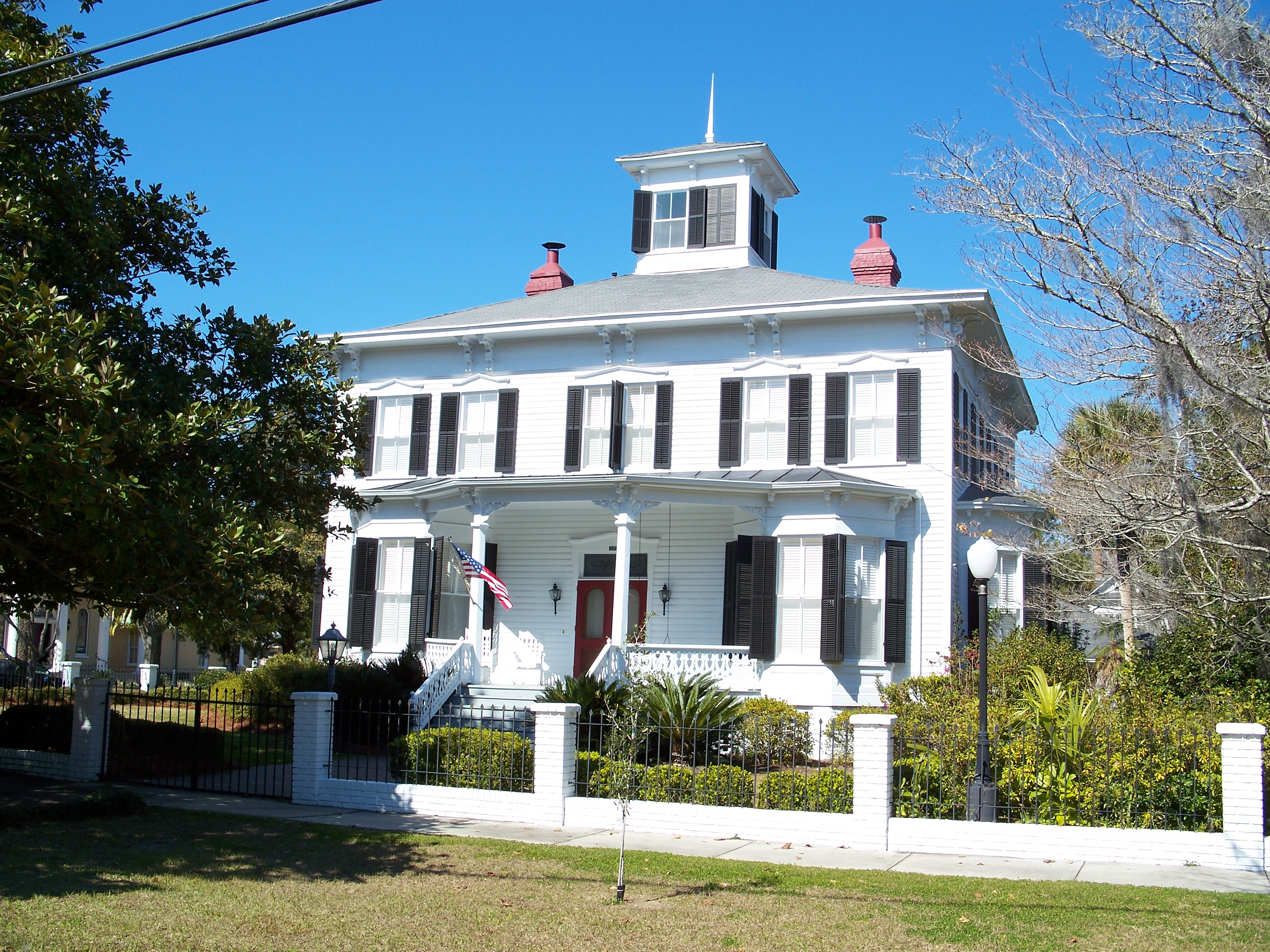

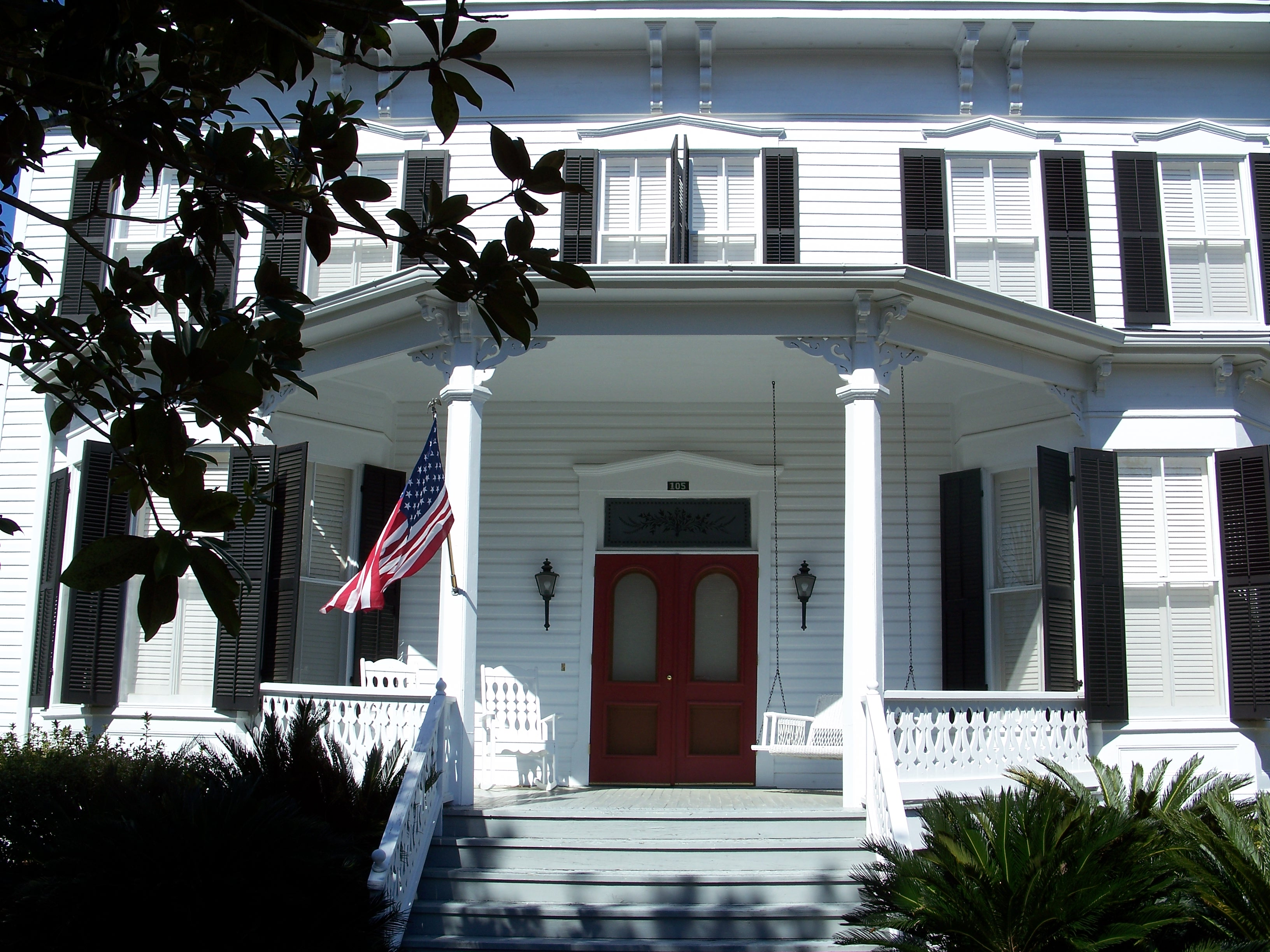

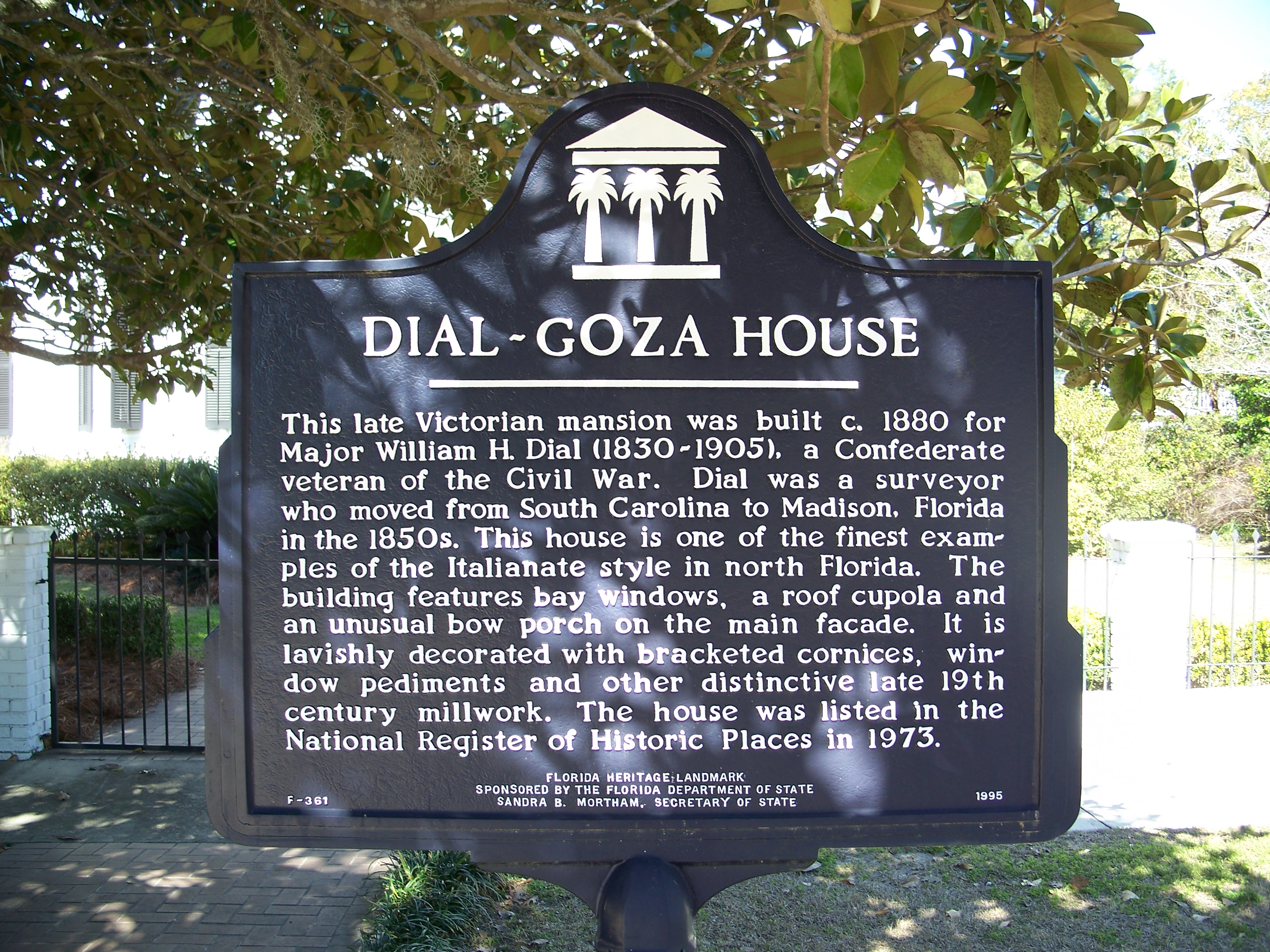
