= IQuarter =

Hancock & Lant Tower iQuarter
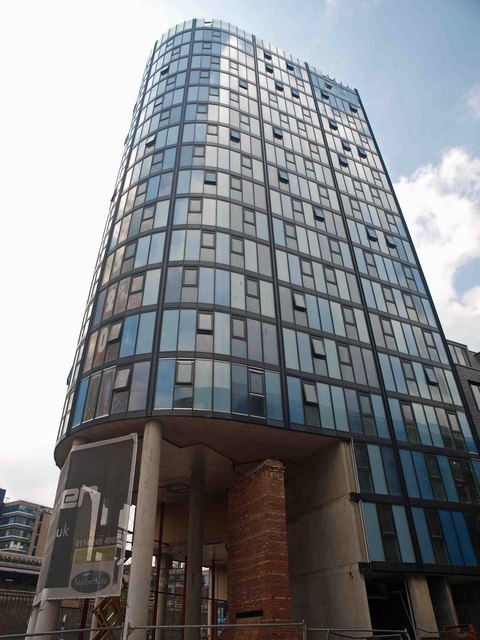

General information
- Status: Completed
- Type: Residential
- Location: Blonk Street, Sheffield, England
- Coordinates: 53.385579°N 1.462898°W
- Construction started: 2007
- Completed: 2008
- Opening: 2008

Height
- Roof: 51 m (167 ft)
- Top floor: 49 m (161 ft)

Technical details
- Floor count: 16

Design and construction
- Architect: Cartwright Pickard
- Developer: Urbani

Other information
- Public transit: B P Y TT; Fitzalan Square

iQuarter, originally known as the Hancock & Lant Tower, is a 52-metre apartment block in Sheffield, England, completed in 2008. It was designed by the architects Cartwright Pickard.

It is named after, and was built in lieu of, the Hancock and Lant furniture company formerly occupying the site.
