= Dial Records =

Dial Records may refer to:

- Dial Records (1946), a U.S.-based jazz and classical label, active 1946–1954
- Dial Records (1960s American record label), a U.S.-based R&B label active 1961-1979
- Dial Records (1998), a U.S.-based rock label
- Dial Records (1999), a German-based dance music label
- Dial Records (UK label), a defunct British label founded by William Barrington-Coupe and David Gooch

== See also ==
- List of record labels
