= Mmantsae Diale =

South African physicist

- Born: Pretoria, South Africa
- Occupation: Professor
- Awards: National Science and Technology Forum (NSTF) prize in 2018

Academic background
- Education: PhD degree, the University of Pretoria MSc in Physics from the Medical University of Southern Africa (SMU)
- Alma mater: University of Pretoria

Academic work
- Discipline: Scientists(Physics)

Mmantsae Diale is a South African professor of physics at the University of Pretoria, researcher, and the South African Research Chair (SARCHI) in clean and green energy. Her research focus is on physical and chemical means to control the electronic and optical properties of materials. Mmantsae Diale is the founder and chair of Women in Physics in South Africa (WiPiSA).

== Education ==
Mmantsae Diale obtained her Bachelor of Science in Education(Physics and Mathematics) from North West University (Mafikeng), Master of Science in Physics from the Medical University of Southern Africa (SMU)and BSc Honours in Physics at Sefako Makgatho University in Pretoria. She studied for her PhD degree at the University of Pretoria.

== Awards ==
In 2018, Diale was awarded the National Science and Technology Forum (NSTF) Award for Engineering Research Capacity Development for her significant impact on STEM capacity building in South Africa. In 2023, she was elected a Fellow of the African Academy of Sciences, recognizing her contributions to scientific research and development on the continent.

== Selected publications ==
- Mtangi, W.; Auret, F.D.; Nyamhere, C.; Janse van Rensburg, P.J.; Chawanda, M. Diale, A. (2009). "Analysis of temperature dependent measurements on Pd/ZnO Schottky barrier diodes and the determination of the Richardson constant". Physica B: Condensed Matter. 404 (8–11): 1092–1096. Bibcode:2009PhyB..404.1092M. doi:10.1016/j.physb.2008.11.022.
- Diale, M.; Auret, F.D.; van der Berg, N.G.; Odendaal, R.Q.; Roos, W.D. (2005). "Analysis of GaN cleaning procedures". Applied Surface Science. 246 (1–3): 279–289. Bibcode:2005ApSS..246..279D. doi:10.1016/j.apsusc.2004.11.024.
- Kyesmen, Pannan I.; Nombona, Nolwazi; Diale, Mmantsae (2021). "Heterojunction of nanostructured α-Fe2O3/CuO for enhancement of photoelectrochemical water splitting" (PDF). Journal of Alloys and Compounds. 863 158724. doi:10.1016/j.jallcom.2021.158724.
- Omotoso, E.; Meyer, W.E.; Auret, F.D.; Paradzah, A.T.; Diale, M.; Coelho, S.M.M.; Janse van Rensburg, P.J. (2015). "The influence of high energy electron irradiation on the Schottky barrier height and the Richardson constant of Ni/4H-SiC Schottky diodes" (PDF). Materials Science in Semiconductor Processing. 39: 112–118. doi:10.1016/j.mssp.2015.04.031.
- Rosenberg, John W.; Legodi, Matshisa J.; Rakita, Yevgeny; Cahen, David; Diale, Mmantsae (2017-10-14). "Laplace current deep level transient spectroscopy measurements of defect states in methylammonium lead bromide single crystals" (PDF). Journal of Applied Physics. 122 (14) 145701. Bibcode:2017JAP...122n5701R. doi:10.1063/1.4995970. ISSN 0021-8979.
- Mayimele, M A; van Rensburg, J P. Janse; Auret, F D; Diale, M (2016). "Analysis of temperature-dependant current–voltage characteristics and extraction of series resistance in Pd/ZnO Schottky barrier diodes" (PDF). Physica B: Condensed Matter. 480: 58–62. Bibcode:2016PhyB..480...58M. doi:10.1016/j.physb.2015.07.034.
- Mayimele, Meehleketo A.; Diale, Mmantsae; Mtangi, Wilbert; Auret, Francois D. (2015). "Temperature-dependent current–voltage characteristics of Pd/ZnO Schottky barrier diodes and the determination of the Richardson constant" (PDF). Materials Science in Semiconductor Processing. 34: 359–364. doi:10.1016/j.mssp.2015.02.018.
- Mtangi, W.; Auret, F.D.; Nyamhere, C.; Janse van Rensburg, P.J.; Chawanda, A.; Diale, M.; Nel, J.M.; Meyer, W.E. (2009). "The dependence of barrier height on temperature for Pd Schottky contacts on ZnO" (PDF). Physica B: Condensed Matter. 404 (22): 4402–4405. Bibcode:2009PhyB..404.4402M. doi:10.1016/j.physb.2009.09.022.
- Mwankemwa, Benard S.; Nambala, Fred J.; Kyeyune, Farooq; Hlatshwayo, Thulani T.; Nel, Jackie M.; Diale, Mmantsae (2017). "Influence of ammonia concentration on the microstructure, electrical and raman properties of low temperature chemical bath deposited ZnO nanorods" (PDF). Materials Science in Semiconductor Processing. 71: 209–216. doi:10.1016/j.mssp.2017.08.005.
