= Redvers House =

Office block in Sheffield, South Yorkshire, England

Coordinates: 53.377937°N 1.470513°W

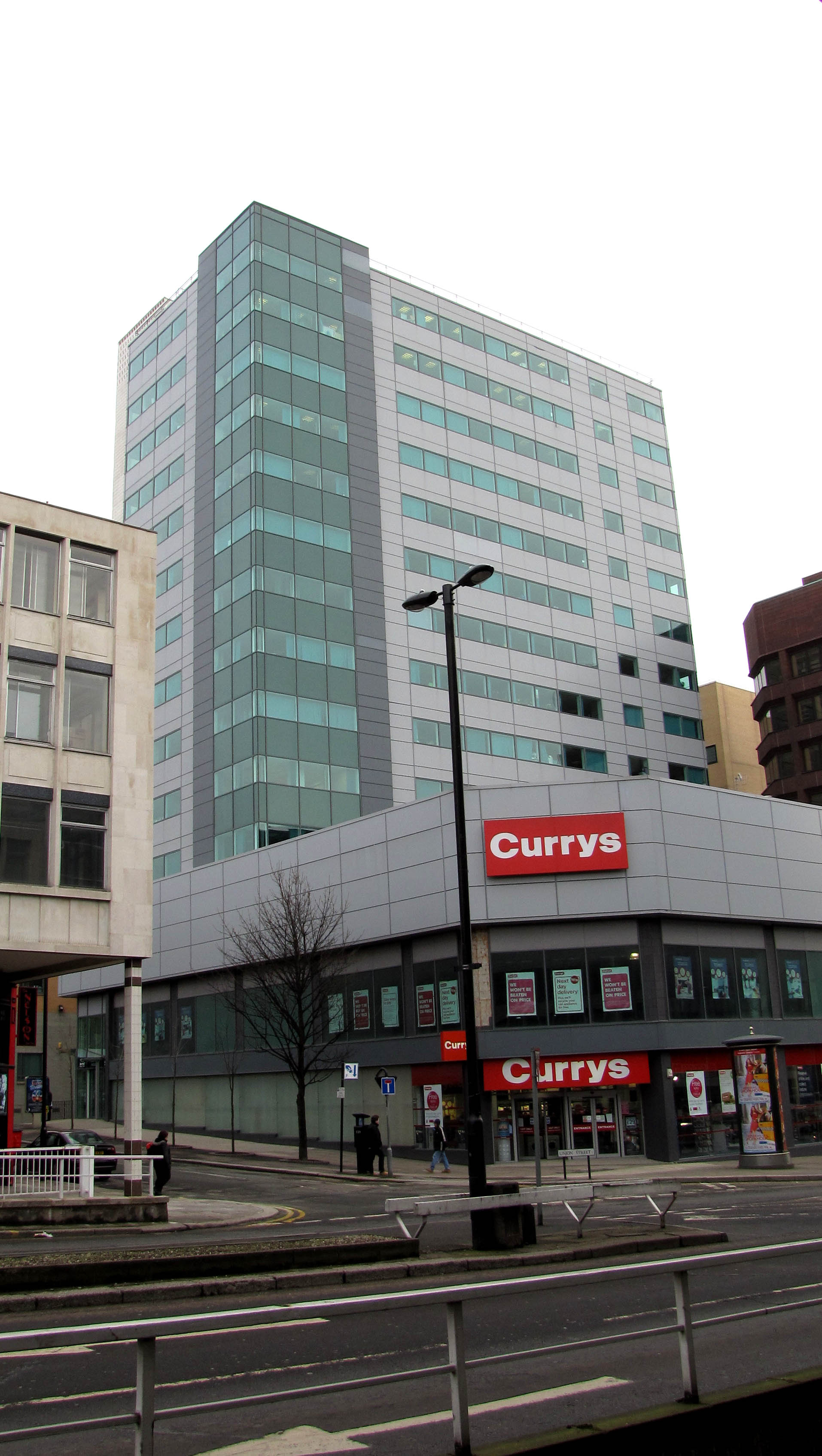
Seen from Furnival Gate

Redvers House is an office block situated on Union Street in the centre of the city of Sheffield in South Yorkshire, England. Redvers House was built in 1971 by the construction firm Newman Doncaster Associates. It is owned by Sheffield City Council and the top 11 stories are used as offices by certain sections of their Social Services department as offices.

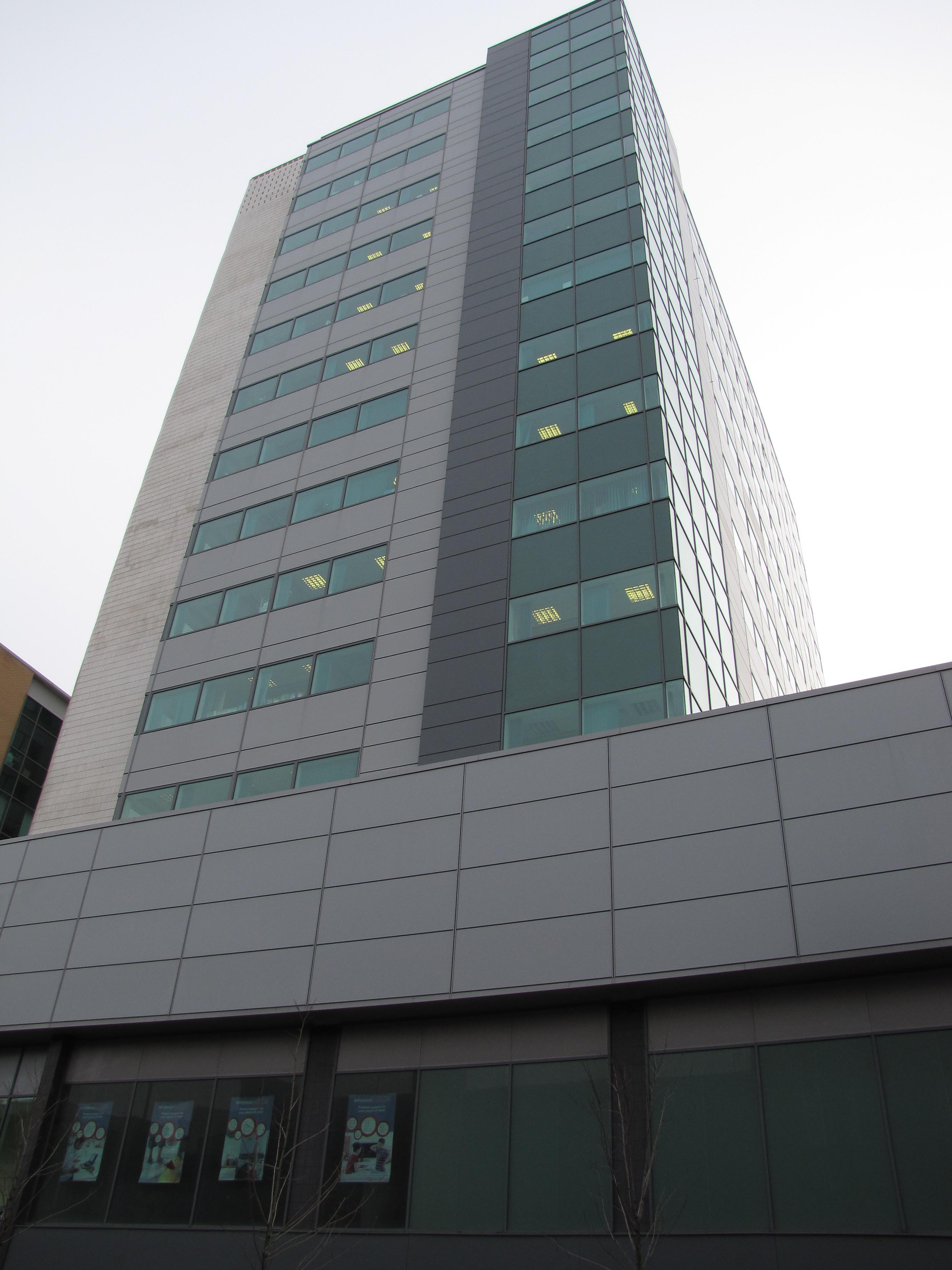
Looking up from Union Street

Among the branches of the department that use Redvers House are Family And Community Services, Sheffield Safeguarding Children Board, Residential Accommodation Bed Bureau, Sheffield Adult Protection and the Child Protection Office.

Redvers House has a height of 54 metres (177 feet) and has 14 floors. The original building consisted of much copper tinted glass, however the building received a major refurbishment in 2005 which include the exterior being re-clad in its present light grey and aqua colour scheme. The refurbishment which was carried out by the Leeds based building contractor Irwins cost £7,000,000 and also included complete renovation of the offices, staircases and toilet facilities.

The lower three stories of the building incorporates a Nisbetts retail store which faces onto Furnival Gate.

In late October 2014 Redvers House came up for sale with a £7,000,000 asking price with Sheffield City Council intending to vacate the building by the end of 2014. The agents in charge of the sale stated that Redvers House could remain as offices or be converted to residential apartments. The building was vacated, following the relocation of Council departments to the Moorfoot Building. Redvers House was subsequently converted in residential accommodation for students and young professionals.
