= Vita Student Sheffield =

High-rise building in Sheffield, England

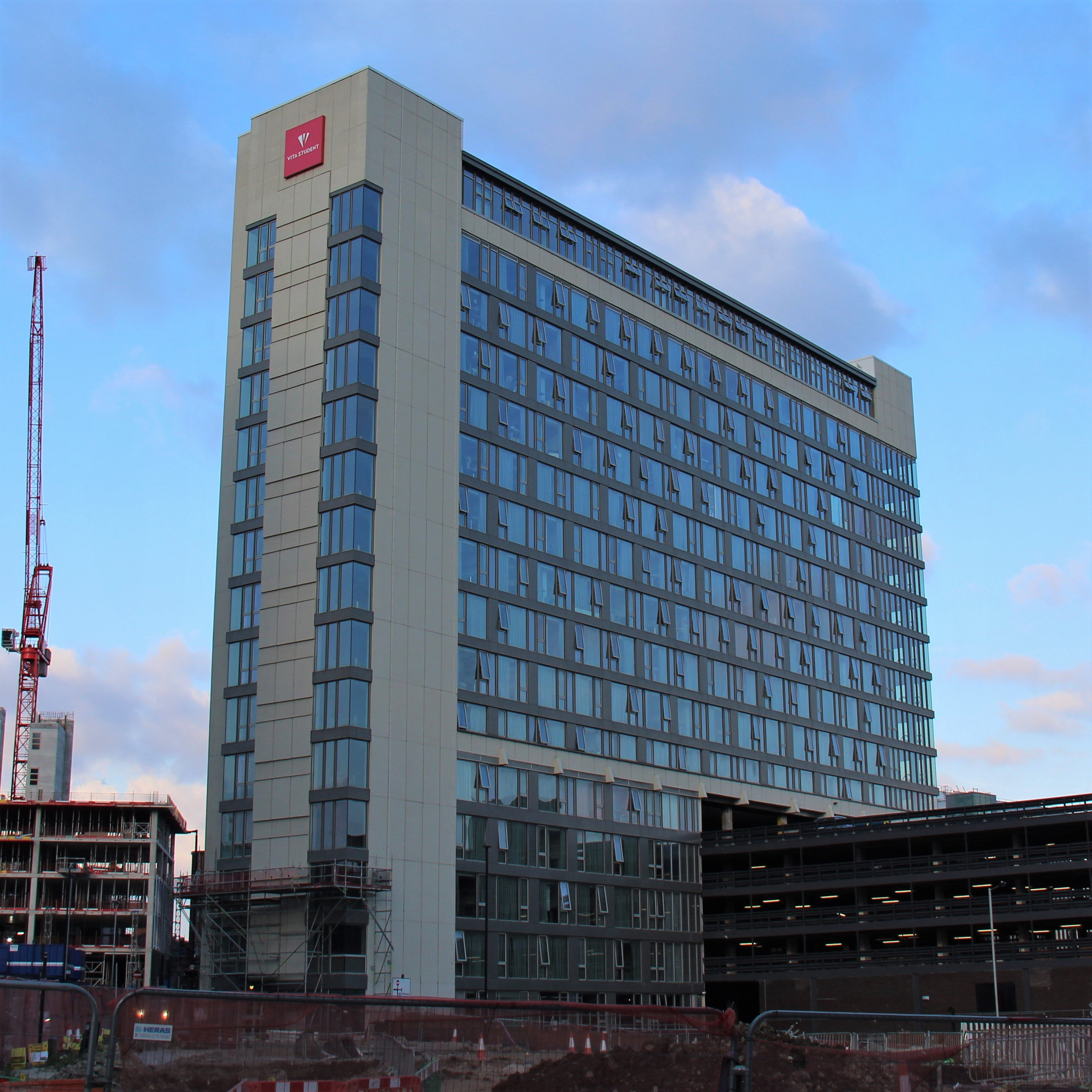
- Vita Student Sheffield following refurbishment, April 2022
- Interactive map of the Vita Student Sheffield area
- Former names: Telephone House (1972–2014)

General information
- Status: Completed
- Type: Office (1972–2012); Vacant (2012–2015); Residential (2015–)
- Location: Sheffield, South Yorkshire
- Coordinates: 53.378343°N 1.473686°W
- Completed: 1972
- Owner: Vita Student

Height
- Roof: 56 m (184 ft)
- Top floor: 56 m (184 ft)

Technical details
- Floor count: 16

Design and construction
- Developer: The General Post Office

Other information
- Public transit access: B Y West Street

Vita Student Sheffield (known as Telephone House prior to 2014) is a high-rise building on Wellington Street, near Charter Row in Sheffield city centre. It is 56 metres tall and has sixteen floors. When completed in 1972, it was Sheffield's third-tallest building; as of May 2020, it is now the ninth-tallest.

== History ==
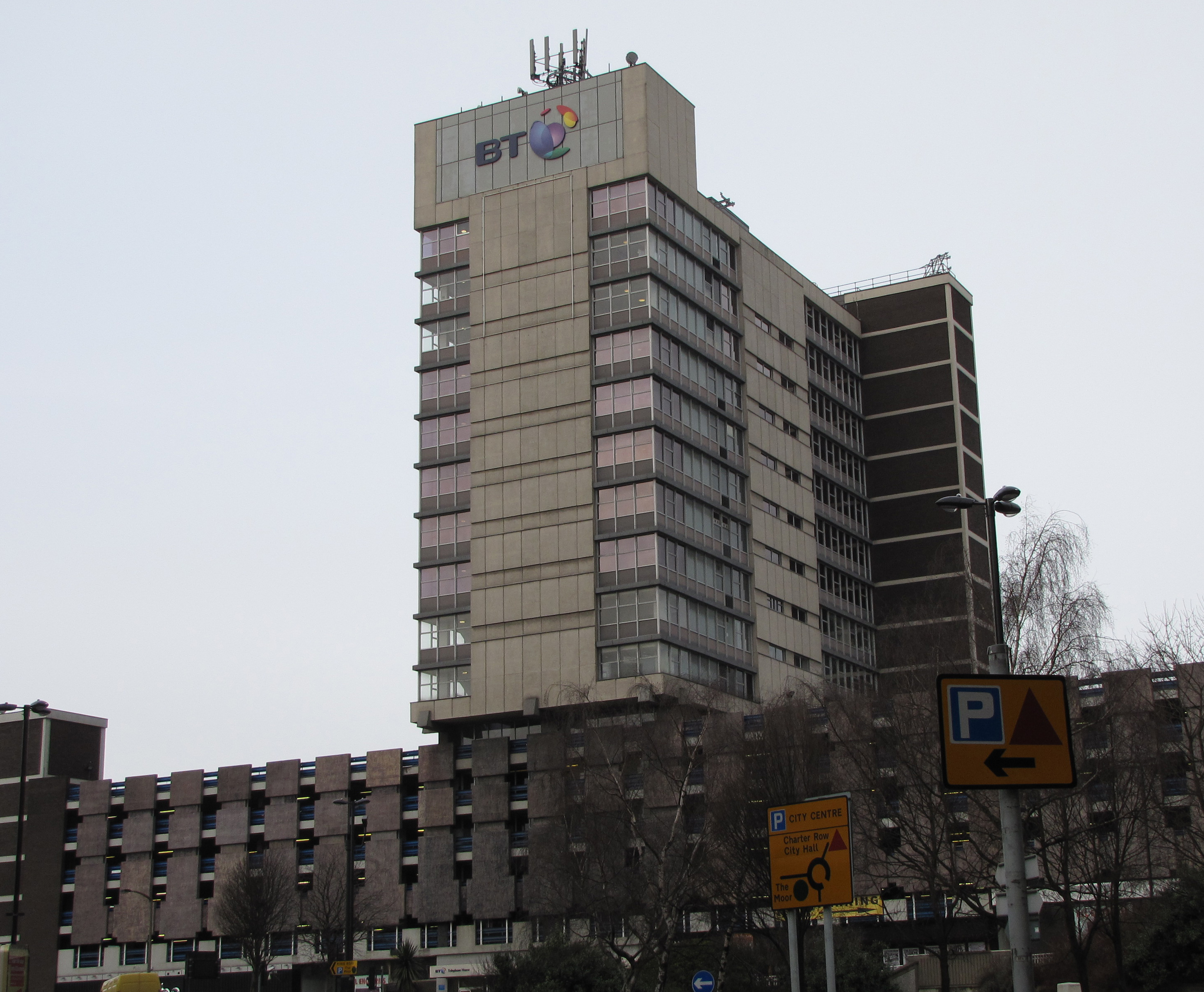
Telephone House seen in 2009, prior to refurbishment

Completed in 1972, it was until 2012 utilised by BT in order to manage Sheffield's phone networks. It was built on the site of council housing towards the end of the 1960s/1970s regeneration of Sheffield. Part of the lower stories of the building now form a large multi-storey car park.

In January 2012, a business consortium comprising companies Ace Liberty and Stone purchased the building, and BT fully vacated in October later that year. Around 400 BT workers and agency staff were made redundant due to the move, although some employees were offered the chance to take up work at Plusnet's Sheffield offices, as the company is a division of BT.

=== Student accommodation ===
In March 2014, the vacant Telephone House was purchased by developer Vita Student, with the intention of converting the building into 366 'high-standard' apartments for students attending Sheffield's two universities (Hallam and Sheffield). The building was renamed to Vita Student Sheffield at this time. The value of the project is estimated at around £35 million and the redevelopment of the building involved a complete refurbishment of the interior and a facelift for the exterior, with all the windows being replaced, while retaining the original look of the building. A sixteenth floor was added containing luxury penthouses and suites. The ground and basement floors, originally used as a car park, are now used for communal facilities such as a gym, cinema, games room, laundry room and reception area.

Refurbishment work began in July 2014 and was completed in August 2015 in time for the 2015–2016 academic year.
