= The Moor Quarter =

Quarter in Sheffield, England

The Moor
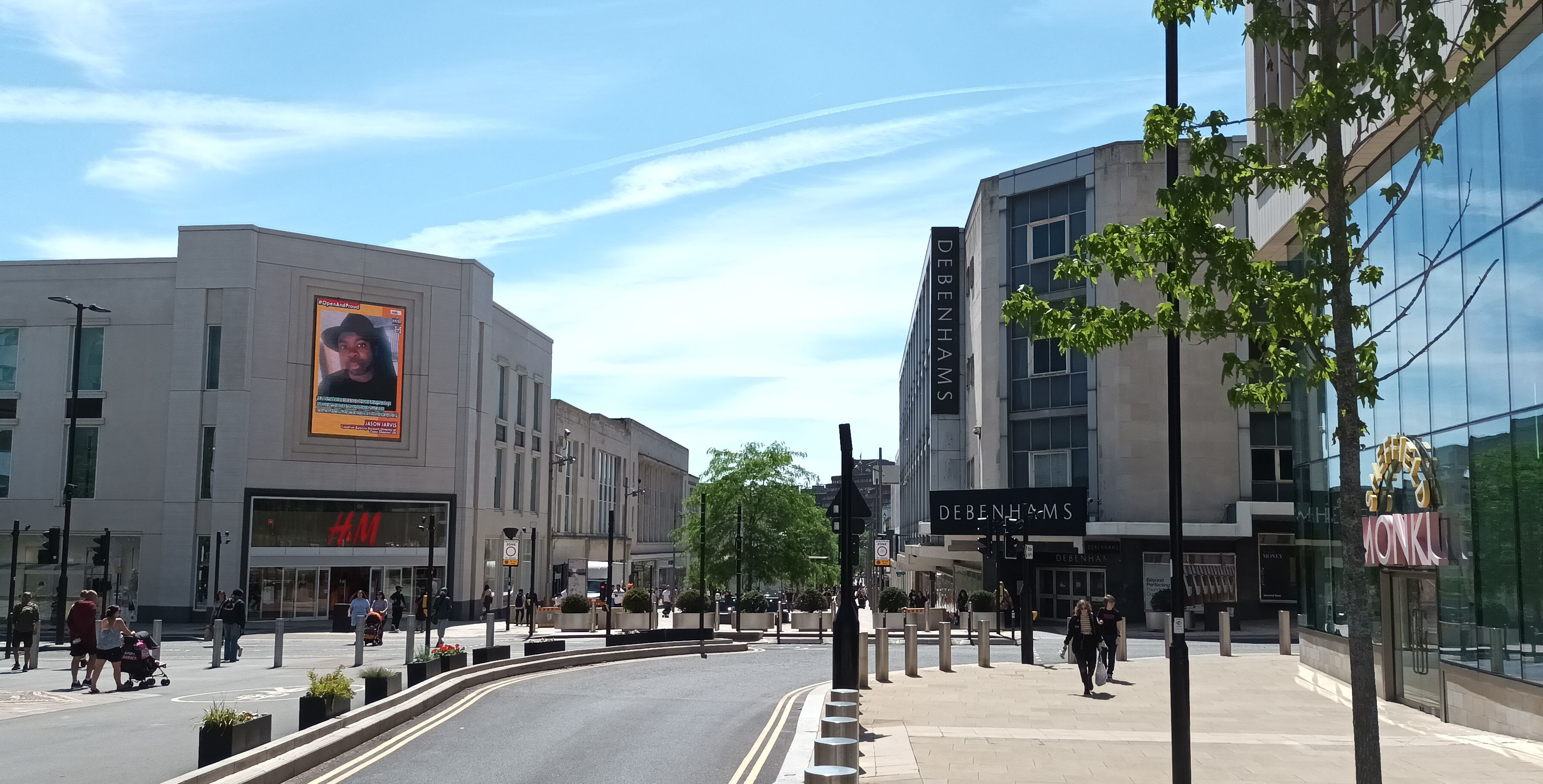
- The Moor View

- Location within Sheffield
- Former name: Sheffield Moor South Street
- Length: 0.3 mi (0.48 km)
- Location: Sheffield, England
- Postal code: S1
- Coordinates: 53.375789°N 1.47367°W
- North end: Furnival Gate / Pinstone Street
- South end: Hereford Street

Other
- Website: moorsheffield.com

The Moor Quarter is one of Sheffield's twelve designated quarters, built around and named for The Moor, a pedestrianised thoroughfare. It is bound by Furnival Gate in the north-east, Eyre Street in the south-east, St Mary's Gate to the south, and Moore Street and Charter Row to the north-west.

It is primarily a retail location, with the city's main market now located in the quarter and more than 70 shops and restaurants. There are also some offices at Charter Row and Moorfoot. It benefits from a good location, centrally between the Devonshire Quarter, Cultural Industries Quarter, Heart of the City and London Road and Ecclesall Road shops.

The monolithic Moorfoot Building is at the south-west end of the Moor. It previously housed central British government departments, but is now used by Sheffield City Council.

== Location ==
The Moor is approximately 0.3 mi (0.5 km) in length and is located in the southern part of Sheffield City Centre. It begins at Hereford Street at the southern end by the Moorfoot Building. It then runs past Fitzwilliam Gate, Cumberland Street, Holy Green, Earl Street, Rockingham Gate and Matilda Street before terminating at the junction between Furnival Gate and Pinstone Street.

== The Moor ==
The Moor itself is a primary pedestrianised thoroughfare and one of the main shopping streets of Sheffield, England. Along its length lie some of the most popular British and international high street names leading it to become the main focal point for retail in the city centre in recent years. The street was originally named Sheffield Moor, then in the early nineteenth century was renamed "South Street", but was again renamed in order to avoid confusion with a South Street near Hyde Park. The shops along it were rebuilt in the 1950s following damage in the Second World War and pedestrianised in 1979 with market stalls now occupying the former roadway.

The Moor stretches from Furnival Gate, Moorhead to the north to Cumberland Street, Moorfoot to the south, where the former Moorfoot Building blocks the route on to London Road.

The major retailers on The Moor include Next, H&M, New Look, River Island, Sports Direct, Primark, independent department store Atkinsons, JD Sports and Sainsbury's. There are also numerous smaller units as well as open-air market stalls in the middle of the pedestrianised area.

== Regeneration ==
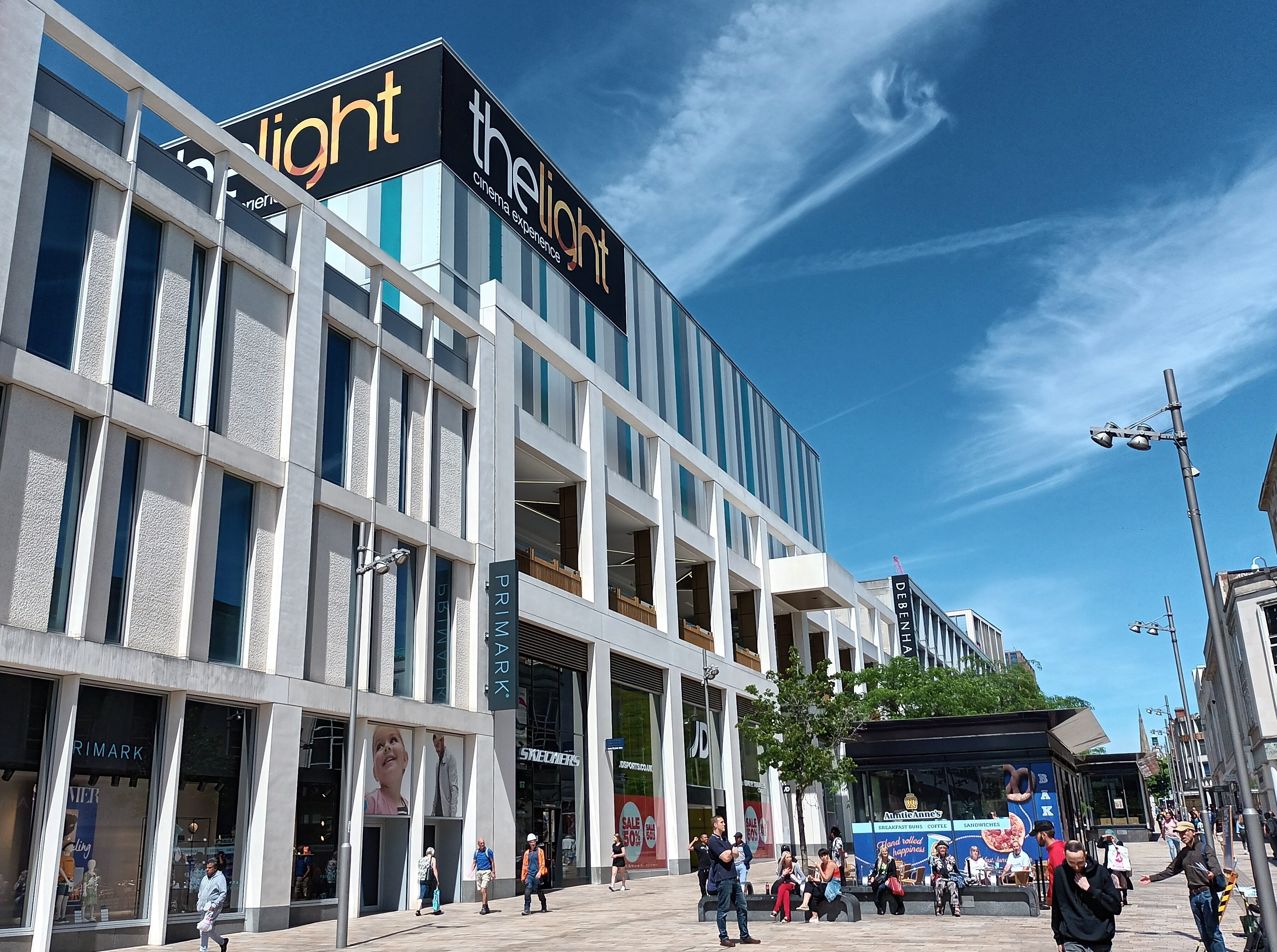
The Light Cinema on the Moor, Sheffield

Since development started in the late 2000s after the area became empty and rundown due to shops closing, The Moor has been undergoing a programme of regeneration by Scottish Widows Investment Partnership, who own most of the buildings on The Moor. In July 2011, SWIP submitted a planning application for a 55,000 sq ft retail block at the north end of the street, which will feature a large digital screen and space for two shops and a department store. The new Moor Market opened in November 2013 as Phase One replacing the old Castle Market in the Wicker area of Sheffield, a new gym also opened in 2016 above the market. After years of planning and construction the new flagship Primark store opened on The Moor in October 2016 as part of Phase Two of the regeneration. The second part of phase one includes The Light cinema and a variety of restaurants, in March 2017 it was announced that the new complex would open on 14 April the same year. The third and final phase of The Moor regeneration opened in 2018/2019 and includes a large digital screen and new shops and restaurants. H&M is the new anchor tenant.

== Moor Market ==
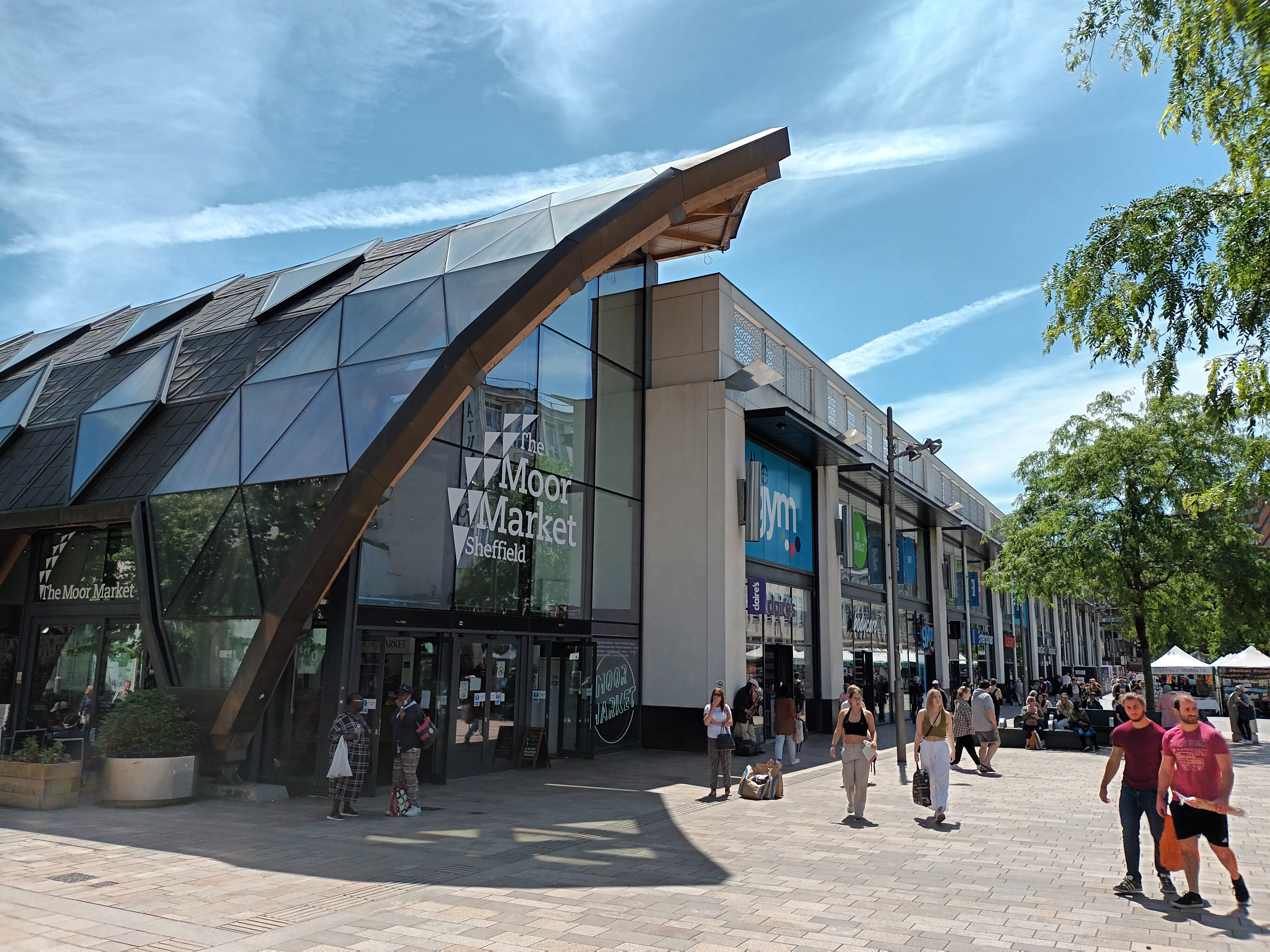
The Moor Market

The Moor Market opened in November 2013 on the corner of The Moor and Earl Street, replacing Castle Market in the Castlegate area which closed on the same weekend. The scheme cost £18 million and includes 200 market stalls and eight shops.

Sheffield City Council own the market and aim to attract 100,000 shoppers per week. Most stalls have been let rent-free for the first six months and at half-rent for the following six months to encourage businesses to locate in the market.
