= Arundel Gate =

Main thoroughfares in Sheffield, England

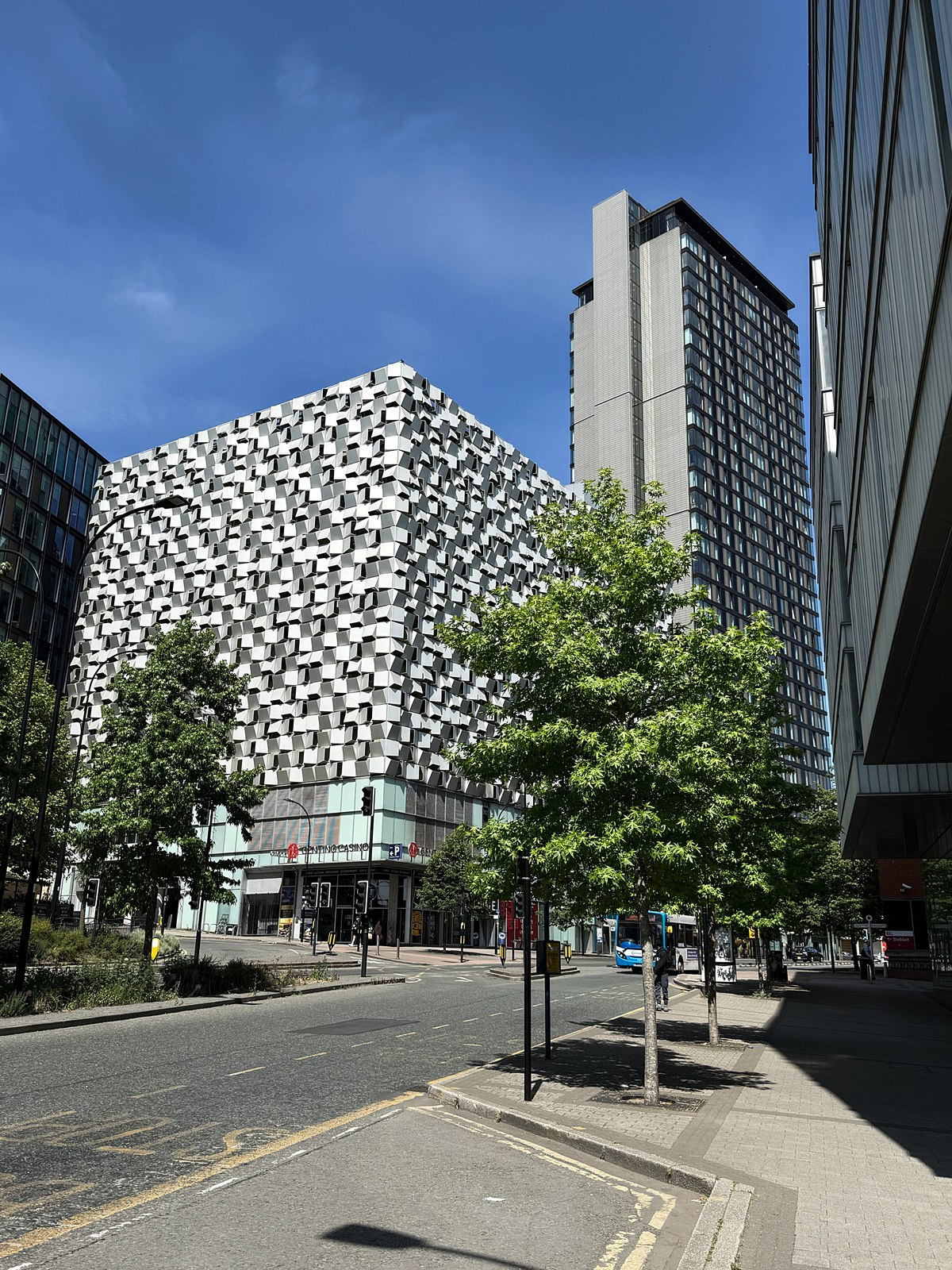
A view down Arundel Gate

Arundel Gate is one of the main thoroughfares in Sheffield, England. It is located in the Heart of the City area of Sheffield City Centre. Arundel Gate also features a fifteen-stand bus station, including a ticket office building, completed in 2005.

Arundel Gate is 0.5 mi (0.8 km) long, running through the eastern side of the city centre. It starts as a continuation of the Eyre Street dual carriageway from the Furnival Square roundabout where it meets Furnival Gate and Furnival Street. Arundel Gate initially heads northeast as a dual carriageway, before turning north at Hallam Square and becoming a single carriageway. Continuing northwards, Arundel Gate becomes a dual carriageway again shortly before terminating at Castle Square, the junction with High Street, continuing onwards as Angel Street (the southeast direction of Arundel Gate becoming a bus gate in early 2023).

Two conservation areas have been designated by Sheffield City Council in the areas surrounding Arundel Gate. These are the City Centre Conservation Area, which covers an area of 0.12 sq mi (0.3 km^{2}) on the western side of Arundel Gate, and the Cultural Industries Quarter Conservation Area on the eastern side of the road.

== Notable buildings ==
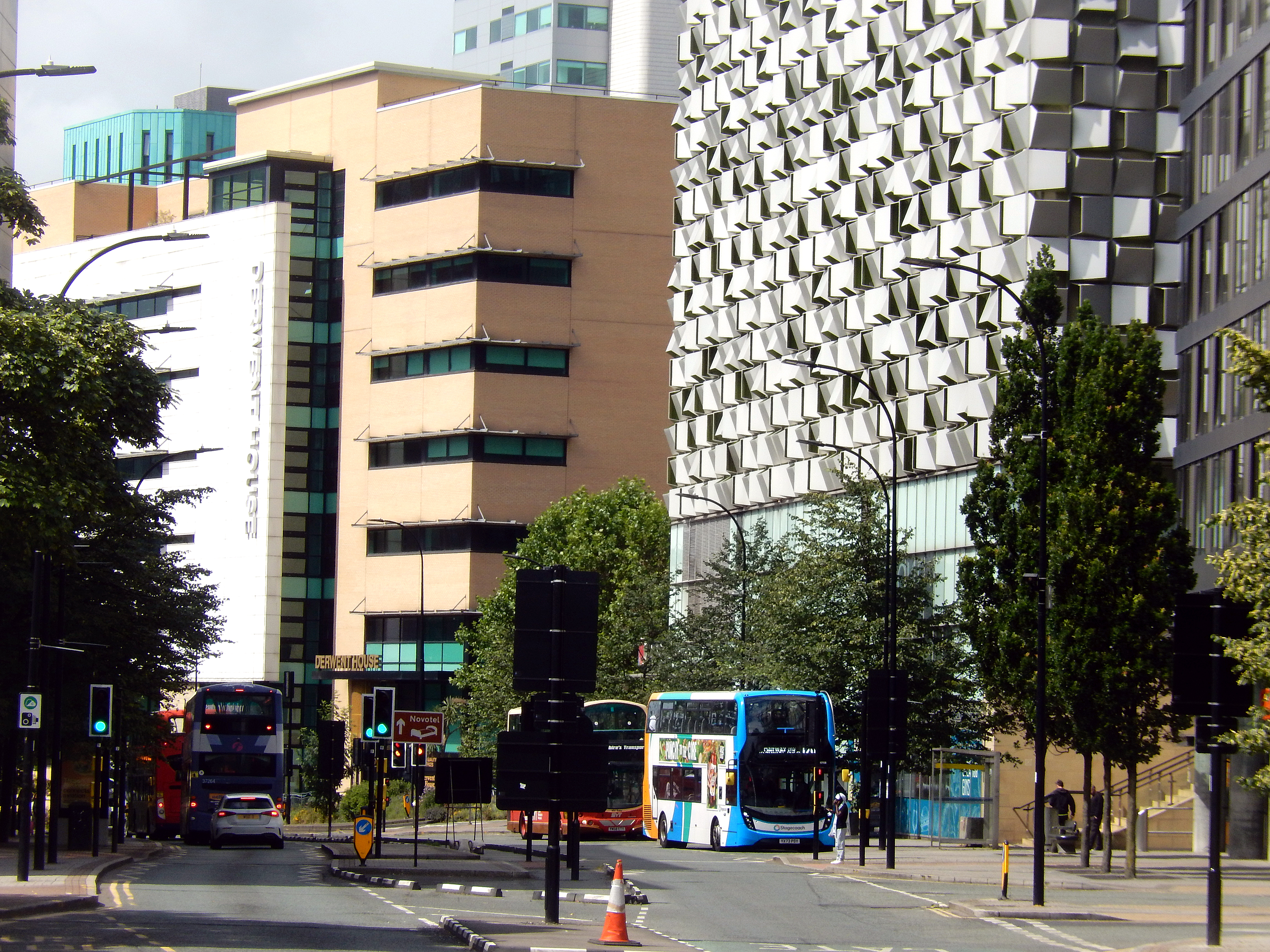
Another view of Arundel Gate

A number of Sheffield's most prominent landmarks are located along Arundel Gate. St Paul's Tower, the tallest building in the city at 101 m (331 ft) tall, and the adjacent "Cheesegrater" car park were both completed in 2011, fronting onto Arundel Gate as part of the St Paul's Place redevelopment. The Millennium Gallery, opened in 2001, also features an entrance onto Arundel Gate. Tudor Square is located next to Arundel Gate near its northern end; the square includes the Crucible Theatre, the venue for the annual World Snooker Championship, as well as the Central Library, Lyceum Theatre, Studio Theatre and Winter Gardens.

Opposite Tudor Square is a large brutalist structure built into the steep hillside between Arundel Gate and Pond Street in the 1970s. The structure is home to the O2 Academy Sheffield, a music venue which opened in 2008; it had previously been the Roxy's nightclub. Next to the O2 Academy is Odeon Sheffield, a seven-screen cinema opened on the site of the former Fiesta nightclub in 1992. In December 2018, the Odeon was reopened as an Odeon Luxe cinema after a refurbishment. A small underground nightclub, Tank, is located next to the cinema. Running underneath the entire O2 Academy and Odeon structure is a multi-storey car park, accessed from the top via an underpass from Arundel Gate or from the bottom on Flat Street, opposite Sheffield Interchange; it is operated by National Car Parks.

Hallam Square is a pedestrianised public square adjoining onto Arundel Gate to the south of the brutalist complex mentioned above. Several buildings of Sheffield Hallam University's City Campus front onto Arundel Gate around Hallam Square, leading down Howard Street.

== Arundel Gate Interchange ==
Arundel Gate Interchange
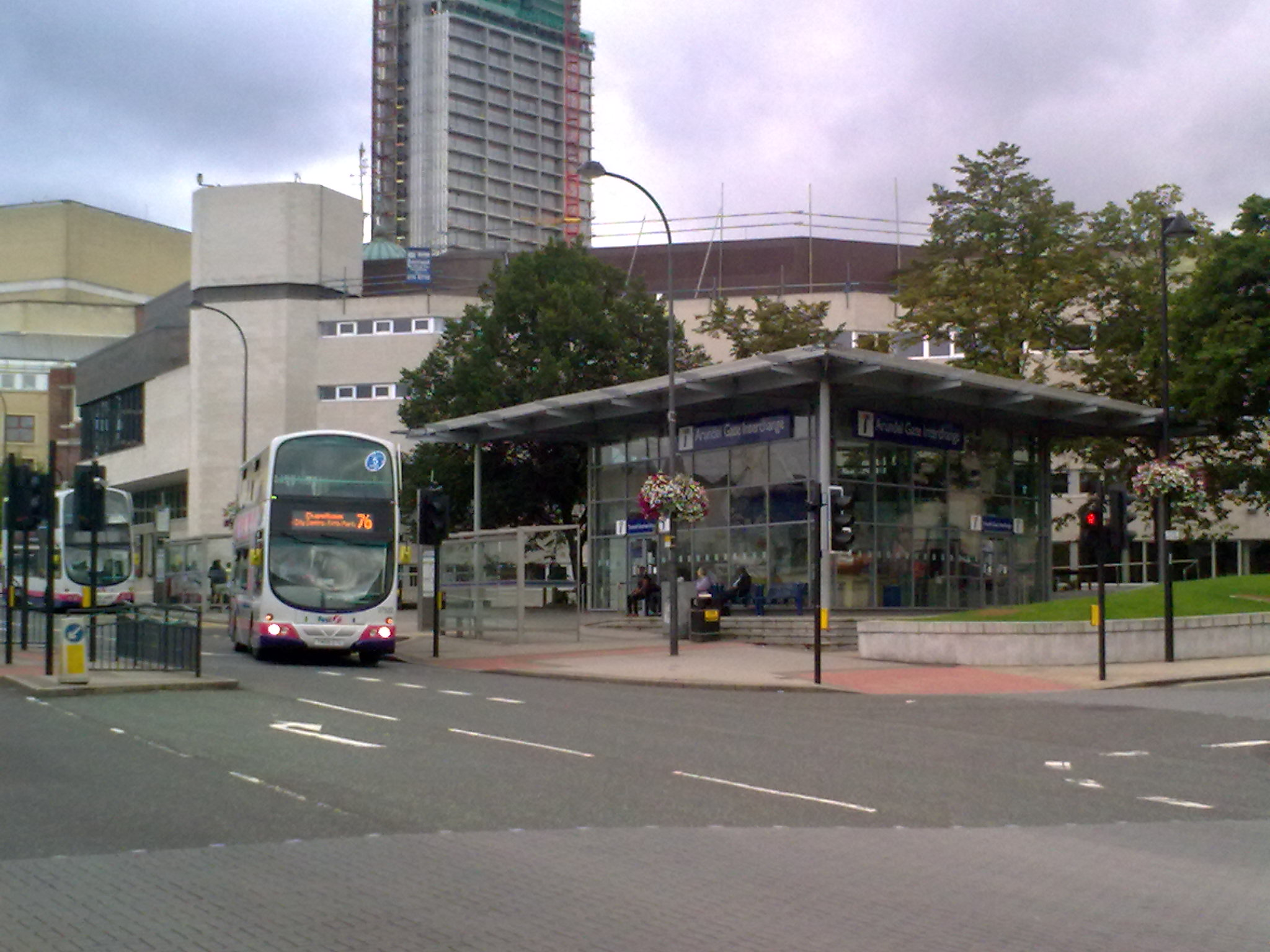

General information
- Location: 30 Arundel Gate, Sheffield City Centre; Sheffield (S1 2PP); England
- Owner: South Yorkshire People's Network
- Bus stands: 15
- Bus operators: First South Yorkshire, South Pennine Community Transport, Stagecoach Yorkshire, TM Travel
- Connections: B P Y TT Castle Square; Sheffield Interchange; Sheffield railway station

Construction
- Parking: Yes (National Car Parks)
- Cycle facilities: Yes
- Accessible: Yes

History
- Opened: 2005 (ticket office)
Location

Arundel Gate Interchange is a linear bus station located along both sides of Arundel Gate at its northern end, between Castle Square and Hallam Square. It is one of two Travel South Yorkshire interchanges located in Sheffield City Centre, along with the main bus station at Sheffield Interchange located 150 m (490 ft) to the east on Pond Street. As well as Sheffield Interchange, further onward connections are available from Castle Square tram stop on the South Yorkshire Supertram network, located at the northern end of Arundel Gate; and from Sheffield station, located beyond Sheffield Interchange.

As well as fifteen roadside bus stops, there is a small Travel South Yorkshire ticket office building located at 30 Arundel Gate, in the middle of the triangle junction between Arundel Gate, Norfolk Street and Milk Street. It is a small triangular building constructed primarily of a blue metal frame with large floor-to-ceiling windows, located directly next to the Crucible Theatre. The ticket office was opened in 2005, originally featuring staffed ticket desks and paper timetable stands. As of 2021, the staffed ticket desks remain, although the paper timetables have now been replaced by automated electronic ticket machines for issuing products onto Travel South Yorkshire smartcards; paper timetables are no longer produced. The ticket office is staffed from 07:00 to 19:00 from Monday to Saturday, and does not open on Sundays. There is also a free-to-use disability-accessible public toilet located on the outside of the building which is available to use 24 hours a day.

A refurbishment project to link Arundel Gate Interchange and Sheffield Interchange commenced in 2018 and was completed in 2020. The project featured the demolition of a row of shops on Arundel Gate, the pedestrianisation of Esperanto Place and Fitzalan Square and widening of pedestrian walkways along Flat Street and Pond Street, and the creation of a new pedestrian link between the cul-de-sac of Esperanto Place and Arundel Gate at the site of the demolished shop buildings. This project created a new high-quality walkway between the two bus stations.

In response to the COVID-19 pandemic in the United Kingdom, temporary changes were made to Arundel Gate Interchange in order to allow for more effective social distancing at peak times. To reduce overcrowding at existing bus stops, two new bus stops were opened on the southbound side of Arundel Gate. These new bus stops were numbered AG123 and AG124; this temporary numbering scheme in the hundreds follows on from other temporary bus stops installed across Sheffield City Centre in response to the pandemic, rather than the numbering system of the existing permanent bus stops at Arundel Gate. Additionally, the roadway at Arundel Gate was reduced from three lanes wide in the northbound direction to two, allowing the pavement to be widened to increase available pedestrian space at the existing bus stops.

=== Services ===
Bus stops AG1 to AG8 and AG11 are located on the northbound side of Arundel Gate; all of the others are located on the southbound side of the road, including temporary bus stops AG123 and AG124.

As of March 2024, the stand allocation is:

Stand	Route	Destination
AG1	41	Dyke Vale Road via Sheffield Interchange, Manor Top, Frecheville and Normanton Spring (First)
AG1	120	Halfway via Sheffield Interchange, Manor Top, Frecheville, Crystal Peaks and Waterthorpe (First & Stagecoach)
AG2	30, 30a	Plumbley via Handsworth, Woodhouse, Beighton, Sothall, Crystal Peaks and Westfield (TM Travel)
AG2	52, 52a	Woodhouse via Darnall, Handsworth and Woodhouse Mill (First & Stagecoach)
AG2	80, 80a	Chesterfield via Sheffield Interchange, Manor Top, Mosborough, Crystal Peaks, Waterthorpe, Halfway, Killamarsh, Norwood, Mastin Moor and Staveley (Stagecoach)
AG2	X30	Harthill via Normanton Spring, Woodhouse, Beighton, Sothall, Halfway, Killamarsh, Norwood and Woodall (TM Travel)
AG3
AG3	24, 25	Woodhouse via Manor Park, Richmond and Stradbroke (First & Stagecoach)
AG4	1, 1a	High Green via the Northern General Hospital, Firth Park, Shiregreen, Ecclesfield and Chapeltown (First & Stagecoach)
AG4	88	Ecclesfield via Burngreave, Pitsmoor, the Northern General Hospital and Firth Park (Stagecoach)
AG5	75, 76	Shiregreen via Pitsmoor, Fir Vale, the Northern General Hospital and Firth Park (First)
AG6	20	Ecclesfield via Burngreave, Pitsmoor, the Northern General Hospital, Shirecliffe, Southey Green and Parson Cross (First)
AG6	83	Ecclesfield via Pitsmoor, Shirecliffe and Southey Green (First & Stagecoach)
AG6	97, 98	Hillsborough via Burngreave, Pitsmoor, the Northern General Hospital, Shirecliffe and Southey Green (First)
AG6	X1, X2	Maltby via Attercliffe, Meadowhall, Masbrough, Rotherham, Herringthorpe, Wickersley and Flanderwell (First Steel Link)
AG7	5	Firth Park via Burngreave, Pitsmoor, Grimesthorpe, Page Hall and the Wensley Estate (TM Travel)
AG7	7, 8	Ecclesfield via Hillsborough, Owlerton and Wadsley Bridge (First & Stagecoach)
AG8	81, 82	Stannington via Upperthorpe and Hillsborough (First)
AG8	86	Chapeltown via Hillsborough, Wadsley Bridge, Parson Cross, Grenoside and Burncross (Stagecoach)
AG8	252	Crystal Peaks via Sheffield Interchange, Newfield Green, Gleadless Townend, Ridgeway, Marsh Lane, Eckington, Halfway and Waterthorpe (TM Travel)
AG9
AG9	20	Hemsworth via Heeley and Norton (First)
AG9	24, 25	Bradway via Heeley, Woodseats, Meadowhead and Lowedges (First & Stagecoach)
AG10	43, 44	Chesterfield via Woodseats, Coal Aston, Dronfield Woodhouse, Dronfield, Unstone and Sheepbridge (Stagecoach)
AG11	6	Millhouses via the University of Sheffield, the Royal Hallamshire Hospital, Endcliffe and Carter Knowle (Stagecoach)
AG11	51	Lodge Moor via the University of Sheffield, Broomhill and Crosspool (First)
AG12	5	Sheffield, Moor Market via Sheffield City Centre (Powell's Bus)
AG12	X17	Matlock via Woodseats, Whittington Moor, Chesterfield, Walton, Holymoorside, Stone Edge and Kelstedge (Stagecoach Gold)
AG13	1, 1a, 11	Herdings Park via Newfield Green, Hemsworth and Jordanthorpe (First and Stagecoach)
AG13	80, 80a	Sheffield, Moor Market via Sheffield City Centre (Stagecoach)
AG13	X1, X2	Sheffield, Moor Market via Sheffield City Centre (First Steel Link)
AG123	75, 76, 76a	Lowedges via Woodseats, Chancet Wood, Greenhill, Batemoor and Jordanthorpe (First & TM Travel)
AG123	86	Lowedges via Nether Edge (Stagecoach)
AG123	97, 98	Totley Brook via Millhouses, Dore and Totley (First)
AG124	81, 82	Dore via Hunter's Bar, Millhouses, Ecclesall and Whirlow (First)
AG124	83	Fulwood via Hunter's Bar and Bents Green (First & Stagecoach)
AG124	88	Bents Green via Hunter's Bar and Banner Cross (Stagecoach)

== Gallery ==
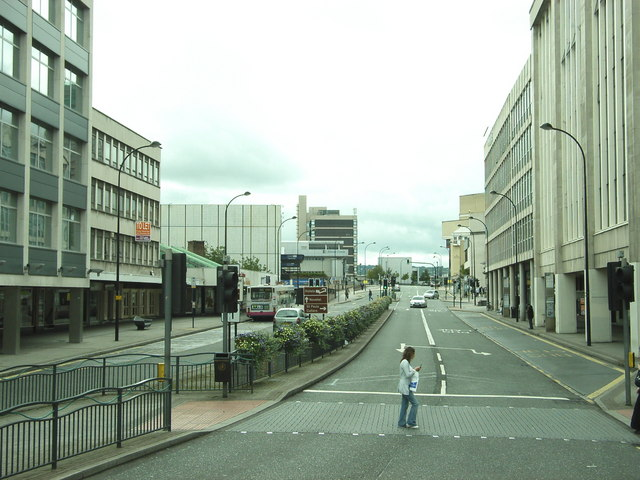
The north end of Arundel Gate seen from Castle Square, 2008

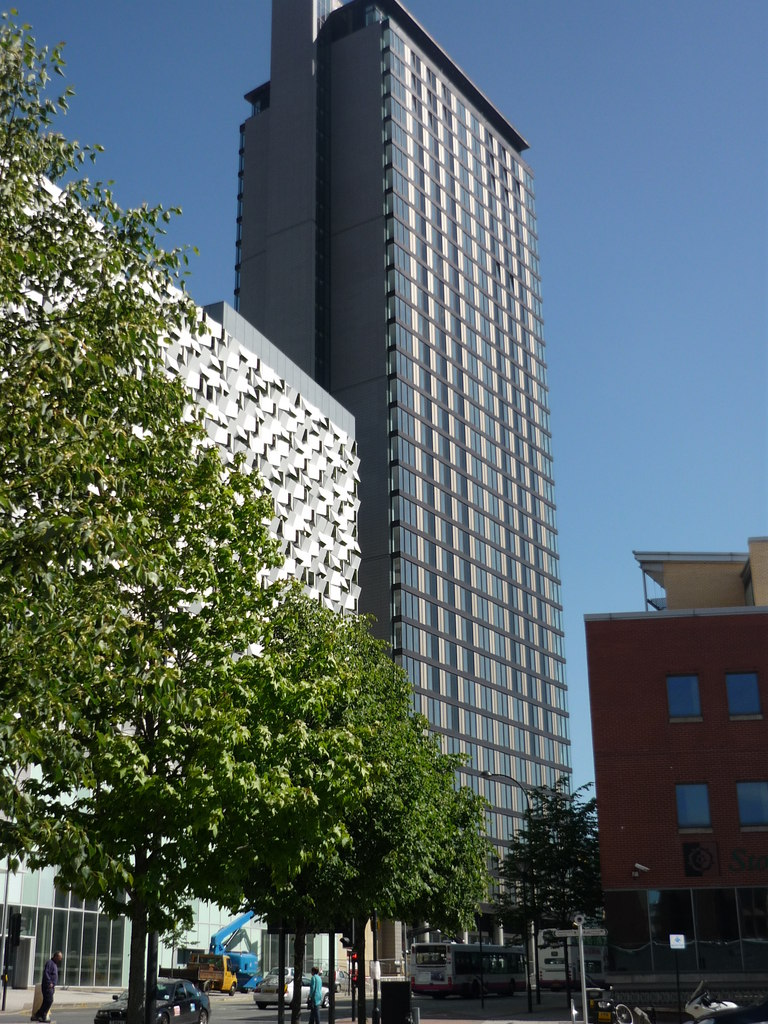
St Paul's Tower, the tallest building in the city, and adjacent "Cheesegrater" car park, 2010

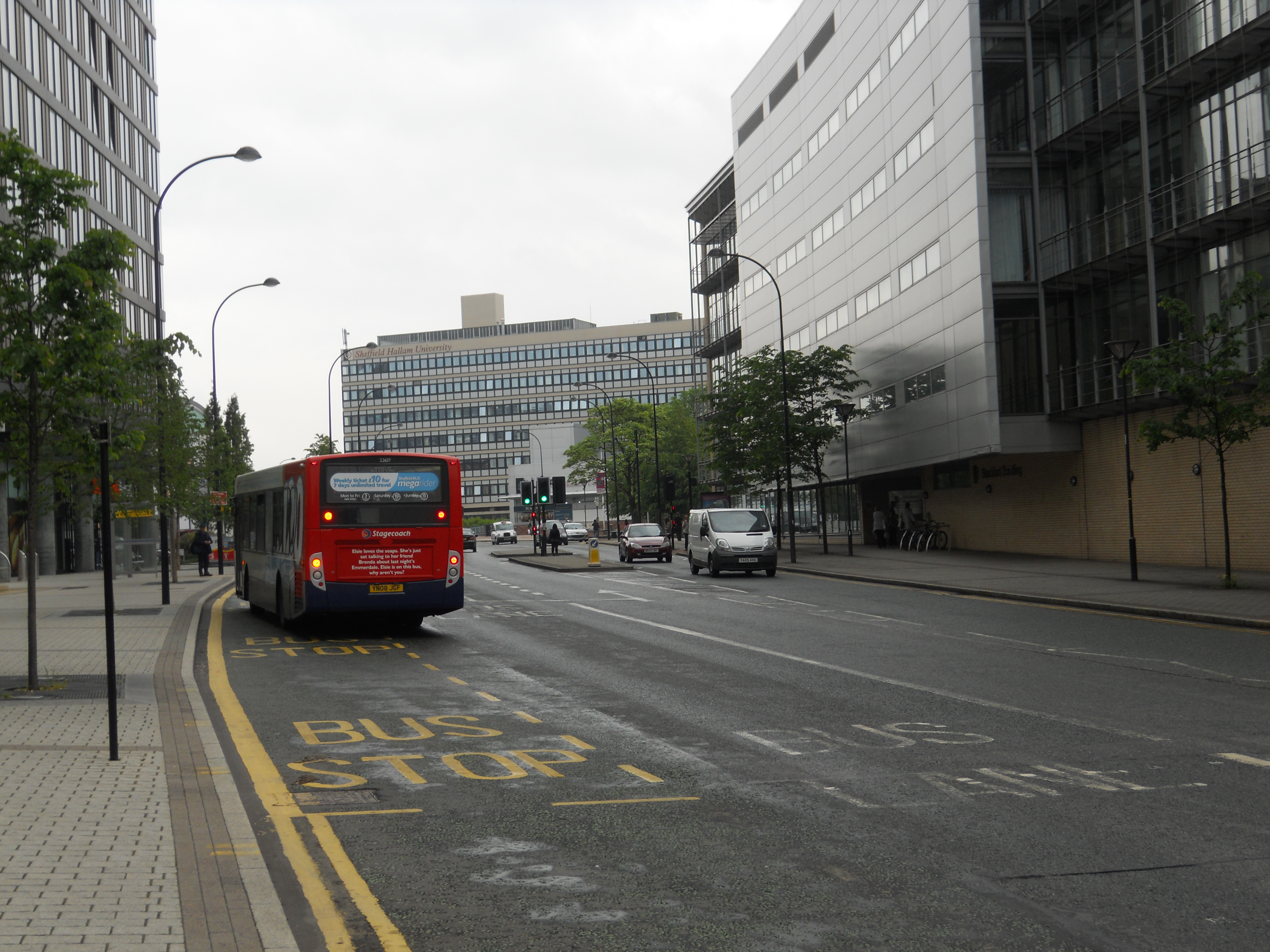
Looking towards the buildings of Sheffield Hallam University, 2011

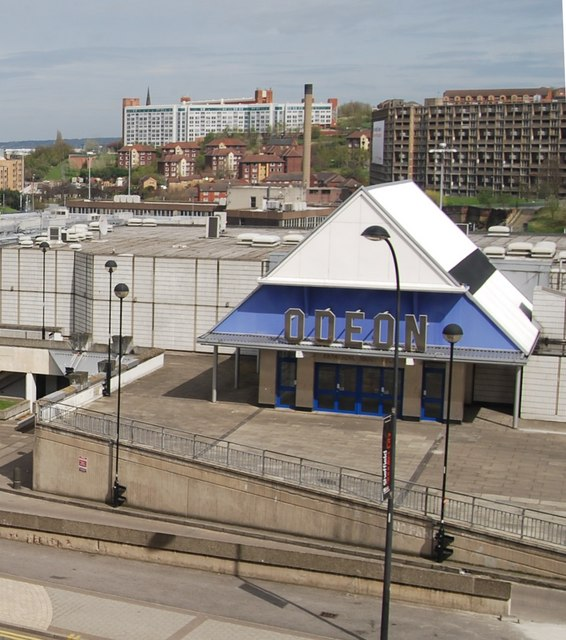
Odeon Sheffield facing onto Arundel Gate, 2008

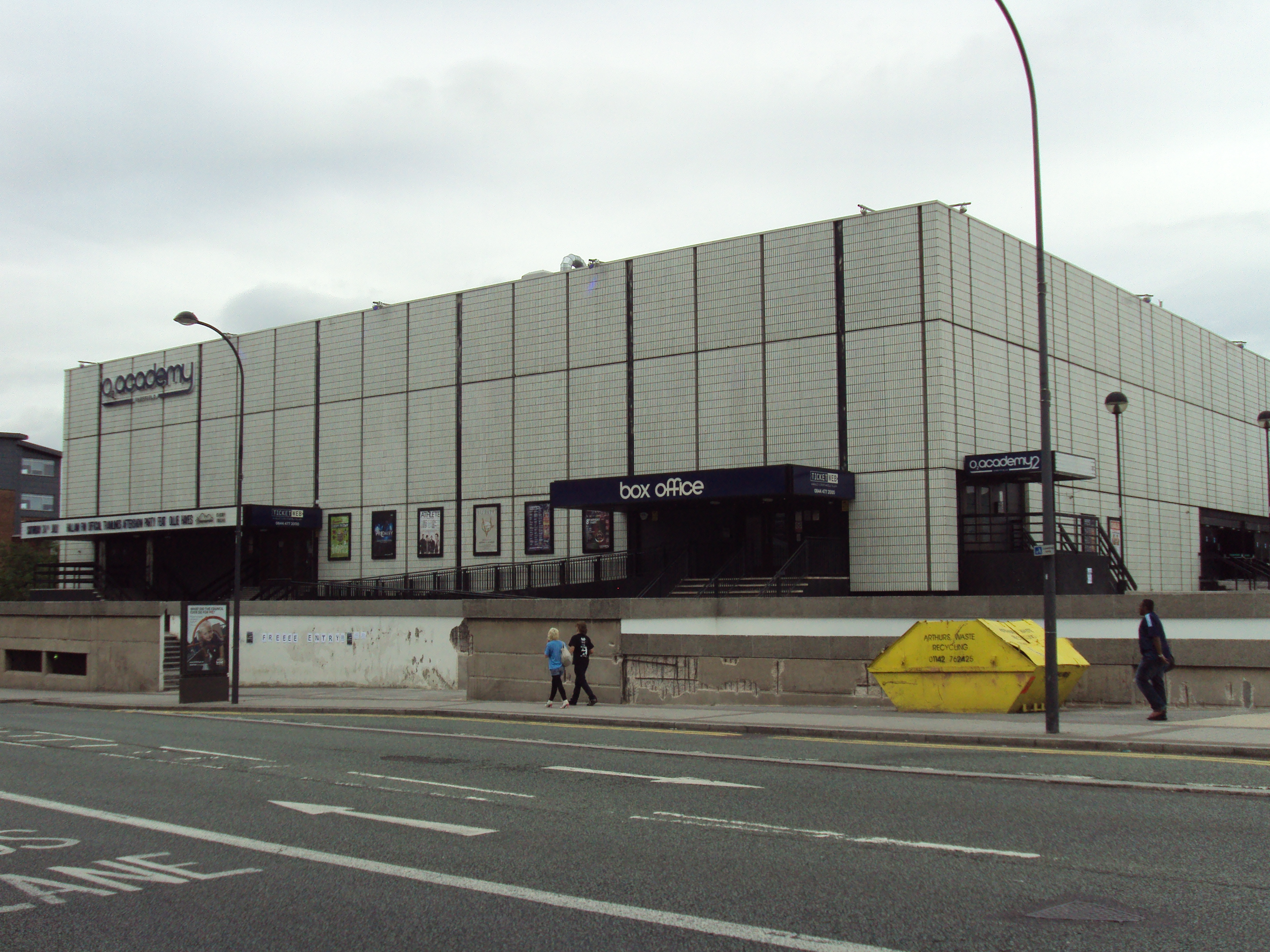
The reopened former Roxys Disco, now the O2 Academy Sheffield, 2010

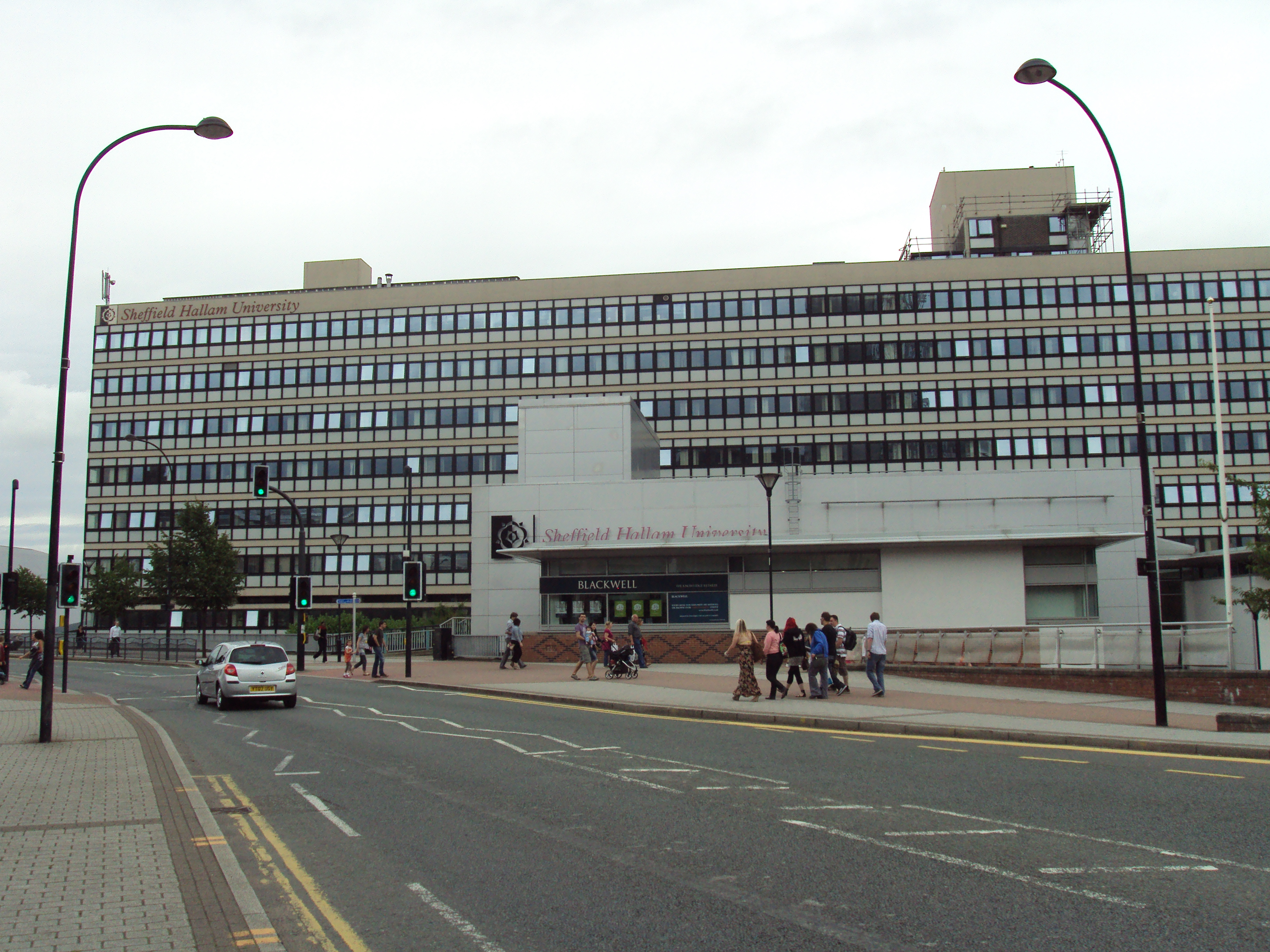
The Owen Building of Sheffield Hallam University, 2010

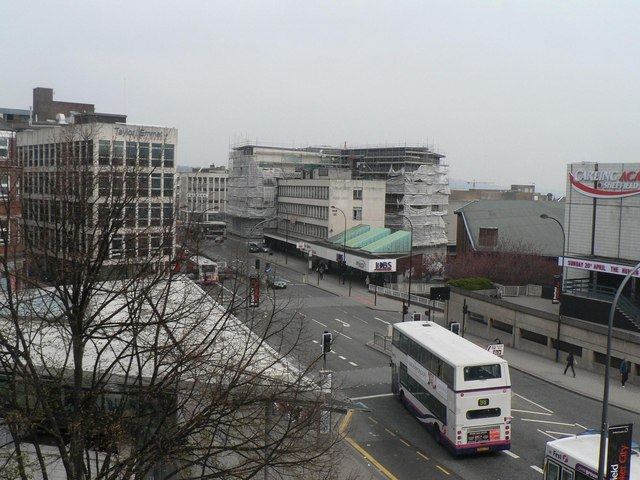
Looking up Arundel Gate towards Castle Square in 2008, with the ticket office on the left

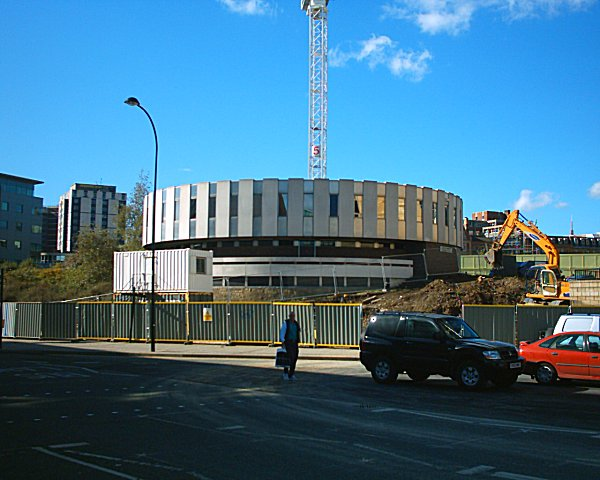
2004 view of the former Registry Office "wedding cake" building, now the site of St Paul's Tower

== See also ==
- Heart of the City, Sheffield
