= Neil Anderson =

Neil Anderson may refer to:

== Government ==
- Neil Anderson (Illinois politician) (born 1982), American politician in the Illinois Senate
- Neil Anderson (Idaho politician) (born 1947), American politician in the Idaho House of Representatives
- Neil Anderson (RNZN officer) (1927–2010), New Zealand Chief of Naval Staff

== Others ==
- Neil Anderson (cricketer) (born 1979), Irish cricketer
- Neil Anderson (writer), English writer and journalist
- Neil T. Anderson, theologian and author on spiritual freedom
- Neil Anderson, former member of Seven Nations

== See also ==
- Neal Anderson (born 1964), American football player
- Neil L. Andersen (born 1951), junior member of the Quorum of the Twelve Apostles of the Church of Jesus Christ of Latter-day Saints
