= Cultural Industries Quarter =

District in Sheffield, England

Coordinates: 53.378°N 1.466°W

The Cultural Industries Quarter is a district in the city centre of Sheffield, England. It is roughly triangular in shape, and is bound by Howard Street, Sheaf Square and Suffolk Road to the north-east, St Mary's Road to the south and Eyre Street and Arundel Gate to the north-west, with Granville Square in the south-east.

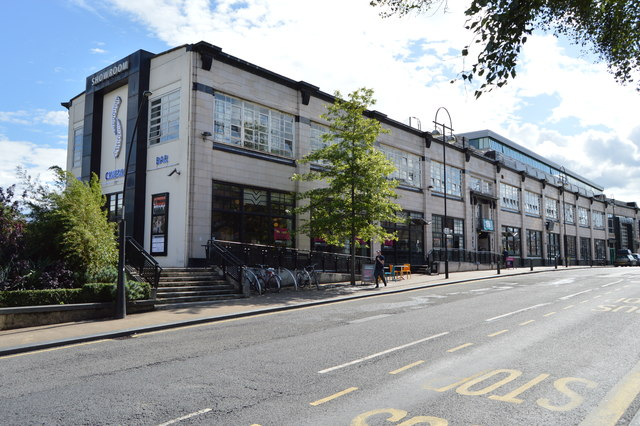
Showroom/Workstation building in the CIQ

The name given reflects the intention to create a cluster of music, film and science-based businesses in the area.

Organisations based in the area include:

- Showroom/Workstation
- Red Tape Music Studios
- Leadmill nightclub and venue
- Sheffield Hallam University and its Students' Union (former National Centre for Popular Music)
- Sheffield Institute of Art Gallery
- Sheffield Live
- Site Gallery
- Spearmint Rhino
- CBC Computer Systems Ltd

The Sheffield Doc/Fest is held around the CIQ each June.

== Significant buildings ==
1. The Butcher's Wheel
2. Stirling Works
3. 92 & 92a Arundel Street
4. 113 Arundel Street
5. Sylvester Works
6. Venture Works
7. Truro Works
8. Columbia Place
9. Redwood House
10. Cooper Buildings
