= Burngreave Community Radio =

Coordinates: 53.391274°N 1.458489°W

England
- Broadcast area: Burngreave, Sheffield
- Frequency: 103.1 MHz

Programming
- Format: On line Internet Radio

Ownership
- Owner: Independent

History
- First air date: 2008

Burngreave Community Radio, also known as BCR103.1FM or simply BCR is a community radio station based in Burngreave, Sheffield, England. The pre-decessor of BCR was Pure Community Music (PCM) broadcast around March–April 2001 on medium wave (1413AM kHz, through a Restricted Service Licence (RSL) broadcast. BCR is Sheffield's newest major radio station, and can be accessed in the local area on 103.1FM or by streaming over the web. BCR plays a wide range of music, and also hosts news, sports, Breakfast shows, talkshows and religious programmes, and has shows in English, Arabic, Urdu and Kurdish. BCR has over 80 presenters, and 440 members and volunteers who help run the station. BCR is also active in the local community, going to events, advertising local shops and businesses, and working in close partnership with schools and charities.

Burngreave Community Radio Limited was incorporated on 21 September 2007 and dissolved on 11 January 2011. Burngreave Community Radio (BCR) stopped broadcasting on 103.1FM in September 2011.
