= Furnival Gate =

Main thoroughfares in Sheffield, England

Coordinates: 53.3779°N 1.4715°W

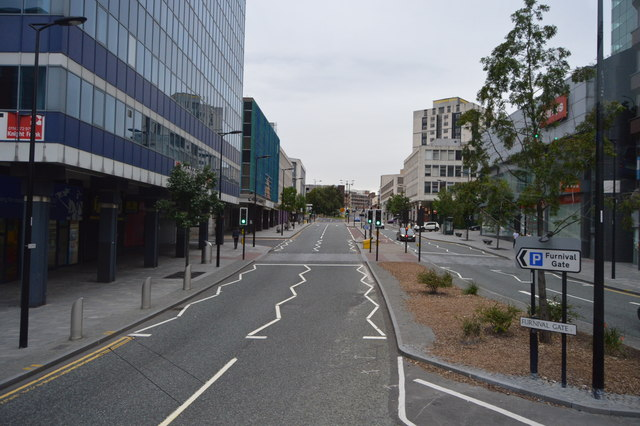
Furnival Gate

Furnival Gate is one of the main thoroughfares in Sheffield, England.

It is located in the Heart of the City area of Sheffield City Centre. The Furnival Square roundabout connects Arundel Gate, Furnival Street, and Eyre Street, running parallel to The Moor Quarter.

The street is named for Thomas de Furnival.

== Notable buildings ==
- Midcity Tower
- The Gate

== See also ==
- Heart of the City, Sheffield
