= Odeon Sheffield =

Multiplex cinema in Sheffield, South Yorkshire, England

Coordinates: 53.380705°N 1.465175°W

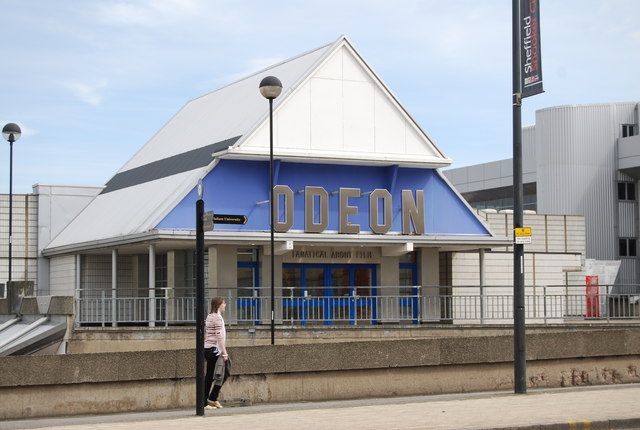
Odeon Sheffield entrance

Odeon Sheffield is a multiplex cinema located at Arundel Gate in Sheffield city centre, South Yorkshire, England, adjacent to the city's O2 Academy.

It is operated by Odeon Cinemas and has ten screens. Screen 1 is the largest, having 252 seats, and is the only one with 3D capability. Both Screen 4 & 5 have the smallest number of seats at 113.

The building itself was built in the 1970s as the Fiesta nightclub and played host to such acts as The Jackson Five, The Beach Boys and Stevie Wonder. Opening as Odeon 7 on 5 March 1992, the cinema had seven screens before it expanded into what was previously the 'Showroom' in 1994 (not to be confused with Sheffield's Showroom Cinema).

Sheffield had two earlier Odeon cinemas, the 1956 Odeon on Flat Street (closed in 1971 and turned over to bingo) and the 1987 Odeon twin on Burgess Street (the parsimonious replacement for the large Gaumont) which survived only until 1994 and is now the Embrace nightclub.

It is now an Odeon Luxe from December 2018.
