= Page Hall =

Suburb of Sheffield, South Yorkshire, England

Coordinates: 53.409030°N 1.4478524°W

- Suburb
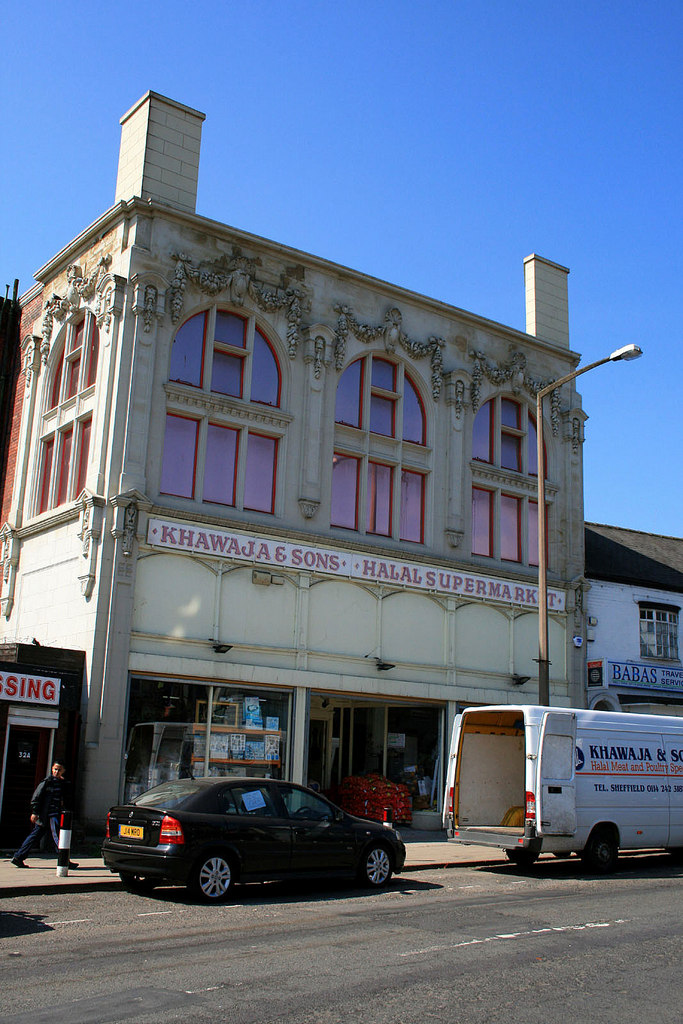
- Khawaja and Sons, now Hamza Supermarket, on Page Hall Road.

- Location within South Yorkshire
- OS grid reference: SK368903
- Metropolitan borough: Sheffield
- Metropolitan county: South Yorkshire
- Region: Yorkshire and the Humber
- Country: England
- Sovereign state: United Kingdom
- Post town: SHEFFIELD
- Postcode district: S4-S5
- Dialling code: 0114
- Police: South Yorkshire
- Fire: South Yorkshire
- Ambulance: Yorkshire
- UK Parliament: Sheffield Brightside and Hillsborough

Page Hall is a suburb of Sheffield, South Yorkshire, England. Located 2 miles (3 km) north-east of Sheffield City Centre, it falls within the Burngreave ward of the city.

== History ==
The origins of the district come from Page Hall, a house built in 1773 for industrialist and banker Thomas Broadbent. The grounds of this house originally extended north into what is now Firth Park. In 1830, the house was purchased by Mark Firth who subsequently expanded the house. The house later became a teachers' orphanage and today stands as Abbey Grange Care Home.

In the early 20th century, the area around the house began to develop with terraced housing built around it. These became home to workers in nearby factories. During the 1960s, immigrants from Pakistan-controlled parts of Kashmir began to move in. In the latter half of the century, the suburb entered a period of decline and by 2005, 37% of properties in the suburb were deemed unfit. However, by 2012, only 33 properties had been improved.

In the early half of the 2010s, Roma immigrants began to move into the area. This resulted in social tensions between the established White British and Pakistani populations and the newer Roma population. This resulted in the suburb being publicised negatively, and it quickly earned a poor reputation for violence. Several mass brawls were published online. Due to the high crime rate, police set up a makeshift base in a house in 2020. After this move, a decline in crime was perceived.

== Education ==
Fir Vale School, a comprehensive secondary school, opened in the area in 1998. There is also Oasis Academy Fir Vale, a primary school, located next to the secondary school and opened in 2014. Sheffield College also have a campus adjoined to the secondary, which specialises in English and Maths courses.

== In popular culture ==
The former Page Hall Picture House, later the Roxy Cinema, on Idsworth Road was used for external shots of the fictitious "Millthorpe Working Men's Club" in the film The Full Monty.
