= Fiesta Nightclub (Sheffield) =

Nightclub

- Industry: Nightclub
- Founded: August 1970
- Founder: Keith and Jim Lipthorpe
- Defunct: 1980
- Headquarters: Sheffield, England

When Keith and Jim Lipthorpe opened it in August 1970, the Fiesta nightclub in Sheffield, England, was reputed to be the largest in Europe. The Lipthorpes had opened a Fiesta nightclub in Stockton five years earlier on the Tees. The Sheffield Fiesta was situated on Arundel Gate in Sheffield, it cost £500,000 to purchase and had a 1,300-seat amphitheatre. Many celebrities of the 1960s and 1970s performed there, generally for a week at a time, with the opening act being The Shadows. Other major music stars performing there included Frankie Valli & The Four Seasons, Matt Monro, Sandie Shaw, The Beach Boys, Stevie Wonder, Roy Orbison, Ella Fitzgerald, The Four Tops, Cilla Black, Lynsey de Paul, Olivia Newton-John, Tony Christie, The Stylists and the Jackson Five, but also comedians such as Les Dawson and Tommy Cooper, as well as the entertainer, Bruce Forsyth.

The building now houses the Sheffield Odeon cinema, which opened in 1992.

== Closure ==
The club closed in 1976 following a 17-day strike by the workers who attempted to join the Transport & General Workers Union. It reopened under new management shortly afterwards before permanently closing in 1980. It is said that the Fiesta's history mirrored that of Sheffield itself. When it opened in 1970, Sheffield was a city with a booming industrial economy and high employment, but by the 1980s, the steel and coal industries were in steep decline.

The venue's story is told in the No Siesta 'Til Club Fiesta book by Neil Anderson. A full listing of the artists that appeared at the Fiesta Nightclub is provided in Anderson's second book, ‘Dirty Stop Outs Guide to 1970s Sheffield – The Fiesta Edition’, by Neil Anderson, in 2020.

== See also ==
- Drinking culture
- Nightlife
