= Firth Park (ward) =

Electoral ward in the City of Sheffield, South Yorkshire, England

Coordinates: 53.417°N 1.444°W

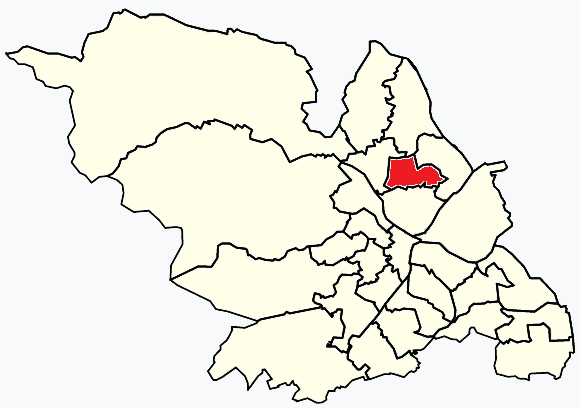
- Shown within Sheffield
- Population: 21,141
- Metropolitan borough: City of Sheffield
- Metropolitan county: South Yorkshire
- Region: Yorkshire and the Humber
- Country: England
- Sovereign state: United Kingdom
- UK Parliament: Sheffield, Brightside and Hillsborough
- Councillors: Fran Belbin (Labour Party); Nikki Belfield (Labour Party); Abdul Khayum (Labour Party)

Firth Park ward—which includes the districts of Firth Park, Longley, Parson Cross and parts of Wincobank—is one of the 28 electoral wards in City of Sheffield, England located in the northern part of the city and covering an area of 1.66 square miles (4.3 km^{2}). The population of this ward in 2011 was 21,141 people in 8,602 households.

Firth Park is one of the four-and-a-half wards that make up the current Sheffield Hillsborough and Brightside Parliamentary constituency.

== Districts in Firth Park ward ==
=== Firth Park ===
Firth Park (grid reference SK368913) is a district of Sheffield surrounding the local park, also named Firth Park, given to the city by Mark Firth in 1875 and opened by the Prince of Wales, HRH Prince Albert Edward, later Edward VII. Mark Firth was the pioneer of a number of Sheffield Steelworks including the well-known company of the era 'Firth Brown'. He was reported as wanting to create an environment with quality housing, leisure and greenery for his workers and their families. The concept has been likened to that of the Bournville project near Birmingham. Firth Park stream emerges from a culvert within the park.

Located just 1.5 miles (2.4 km) from Meadowhall Shopping Centre and the M1 junction 34, and 3 miles (5 km) from the city centre, the area runs from Addison Road in the south of postal district S5 to the top of Bellhouse Road bordering Sheffield Lane Top and Shiregreen. The main through routes are the B6086 and A6135.

Firth Park includes the protected ancient woodland known as Hinde Common Wood, plus a substantial area of parkland along with mostly large Victorian style terraced houses which were built around 1910. Well known landmarks include the clock tower community centre and old library on Firth Park Road, both listed buildings from the early 1900s.

The area benefits from being on a major cross city public transport route for the city of Sheffield and has a shopping centre with over 40 independent shops as well as High Street banks and building societies, national supermarket chains, well-known chemists and a variety of healthcare practitioners.

In the centre of the Firth Park area is the park of the same name, which was refurbished between 1998 and 2004 with a major community centre added in the place of the old park keepers house, new trees planted and a refurbished central roundabout themed on the old tram turnaround point from the 1950s.

In January 2010, the Firth Park regeneration masterplan has been announced to include the utilisation of the natural water stream which runs through Hinde Common Wood. The plans are to bring the stream to the surface within the park itself on Firth Park Road, through the centre of the parkland then under the road to rejoin the woodland via the old boating lake/duckpond next to the historic clock tower.

The scheme is to include new architecture, lighting and seating. It is aimed that the scheme will complete around 2012 and add further trees to the already attractive and popular woodland area.

Significant city council regeneration of private properties in the south of the area in 2005 has helped both the quality of housing and the respective house prices. The area is now one of the more popular residential districts on the North side of the city.

Firth Park district has also been at the forefront of domestic technology for a number of decades. The early 1960s saw the first UK cable TV trial known as 'British Relay' installed across the area and then the city of Sheffield. Yorkshire Cable (Virgin Media) installed cable TV and telephone as early as 1994. British Telecom also provide high speed broadband to the district from their nearby exchange. All major mobile phone operators are served by a transmitter at the centre of the village.

The Firth Park Grammar School was also a well-known landmark and stood for over 100 years at the north of the area with a well-deserved reputation for quality schooling. It was demolished and replaced by a new community college in 2003 which offers a diverse range of subjects.

The Northern General Hospital (formerly the City General), which lies on the edge of the ward, is the largest teaching hospital in the county, spreading from Barnsley Road on the west of the village across to Herries Road on a large site, and has a number of specialist units of national repute. Off Barnsley Road at the bottom of Idsworth Road stands one of Sheffield's oldest working mans club, The Firth Park Working Man's Club.

In January 2026 Yorkshire Water announced plans to start work on a storm overflow project on the site of Firth Park Community Allotments, off Vickers Road. An underground tank with a capacity of 1.5m litres is under construction. The tank is expected to result in a 90% reduction of storm discharges going into Firth Park stream. The work is expected to be completed in summer 2027.

=== Longley ===
grid reference SK352912 Longley is a district of the city made up of mainly local authority built houses and is located between the districts of Firth Park and Sheffield Lane Top in the North of the City.

Longley Park is a substantial area of parkland and adds to beautiful views over part of the city. In the 1960s the park was home to “Longley Baths”, Sheffield’s most popular lido. On warm summer days, especially during the school annual holidays, it was a leisure point for many of North Sheffield’s teenage population. Local business includes the head office of the National Blood transfusion service.

=== Parson Cross ===
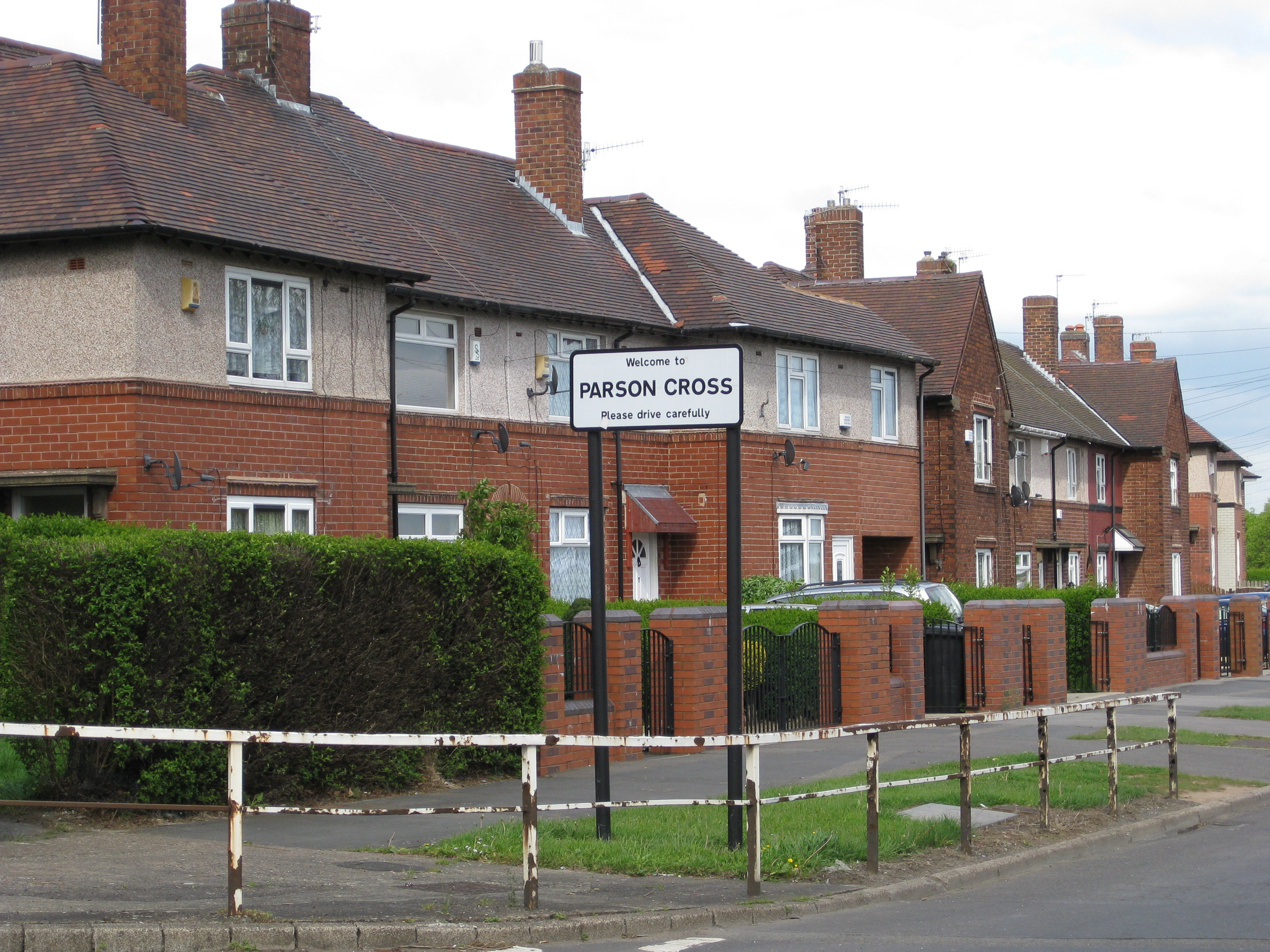
Welcome to Parson Cross

Parson Cross (grid reference SK368913) is a Council housing estate situated 3.75 miles (6 km) north of Sheffield City Centre. Most of the housing was built pre-war in 1938 (referred to as "Old Parson Cross" or simply "Sheffield 5") and post-war in 1947 (referred to as "New Parson Cross" or "The Colley Estate" ), although there was significant continuation during the war, using Italian PoWs who were billeted at Potter Hill Camp, High Green, and Lodge Moor Camp.

In the mid-1930s, Sheffield Council, and the neighbouring Wortley Rural District Council agreed to develop a large area of farmland for domestic habitation. The green belt was bordered to the south by Hillsborough and Wadsley Bridge and to the north by Grenoside and Ecclesfield. The Sheffield-West Riding demarcation line ran through the centre; consequently, there was a small but vociferous opposition from some members of the Wortley Rural District Council, who saw it as an inevitable “swallowing up” of their historical villages by an ever-expanding industrial city. For Sheffield, however, it was essential that they find room for some 30,000 new homes as they continued production of a large proportion of the world's stainless steel. A power sharing agreement ensured that one third of these new homes would be built here, Parson Cross. (One anomaly of this power sharing was that kids in the same class at school, who lived at different ends of the same street, could well be administered by differing education authorities.) According to a 1901 map, a 0.3 miles (0.5 km) circle based around Parson Cross Road and Parson Cross School, was then a small estate known as Parson Cross. The name originates from a large marker cross based at "The Grange" (now Wadsley Bridge WMC) which was visible from miles around, and signified the pathway to the Parsonage at Ecclesfield Church. The base to this cross was unearthed in circa 1908, on the site of The Grange's new vinery, and scattered into pieces. A second marker cross was situated at Creswick Greave. The only recognisable Parson Cross street in existence in 1901 was Doe Royd Lane.

Towards the end of the Second World War, and immediately afterwards, Henry Boot Construction were tasked with building the new estate. German PoWs, who were encamped at the site which would become "Parson Cross Filling Station", were a key part of the building team, and left their mark in fresh concrete at a number of sites, notably at the Westernmost junction of Wordsworth Avenue and Margetson Crescent. During the late 1940s and throughout the 1950s, families were moved onto Parson Cross from industrialized areas of Sheffield such as Attercliffe and Heeley, where Victorian and Georgian cramped social housing units were being demolished, or turned from multi-occupancy to single-occupancy buildings. The estate now bordered the other Sheffield estates of Shiregreen, Ecclesfield, Longley, Southey, Owlerton, Wadsley Bridge, and Foxhill.

The two main roads (no new thoroughfare was called “Street”) were Wordsworth Avenue, which runs the entire length from south to north, and Deerlands Avenue, running east to west. The point at which the two avenues cross is generally seen as the epicentre of (nickname) “The Cross” and is home to The Parson Cross Hotel and, for many years, was the 53 bus terminus. In 2011 a large Asda Supermarket opened at this juncture, on Chaucer School's former playing fields. Still the epicentre, it's now universally known as "The Asda Roundabout"

The other thoroughfares (Chaucer Road, Yew Lane, Southey Green Road, Buchanan Road, Lindsay Avenue and Colley Road) cross the estate. The A61 (Halifax Road) runs to the west and the A6135 (Barnsley Road) runs to the east of the estate. Schools include Meynell, Mansel, Monteney, Parson Cross and St Thomas More's Primary Schools with Yewlands and Chaucer Secondary Schools. Shopping centres are located on Margetson Crescent, Wordsworth Drive, Buchanan Road, Lindsay Avenue, Wheata Road and Chaucer Road. Playing fields are situated at Colley Recreation Ground and Parson Cross Park. A new library was built on Wordsworth Avenue, opposite the Asda in 2011. The church for the post-war New Parson Cross area is St Paul's on Wordsworth Avenue. The only significant waterway in Parson Cross is the "Tongue Gutter", a small brook which runs parallel with Deerlands Avenue for the entire width of the estate and which fed Ecclesfield Well from the 16th century onwards. In 1960, Parson Cross contained 10,000 houses, which were home to a total of 50,000 people, one-tenth of Sheffield's entire population, and together with the Shiregreen estate formed "Sheffield 5", Europe’s largest social housing conurbation.

For the first families moving on to Parson Cross, it was a working-class paradise. Most had experienced only multi-occupancy terraced dwellings, and the chance to have one's own house, with indoor bathroom and toilet and front and back gardens was something previously unimaginable, especially after the dark years of World War II and the extra industrial responsibility this laid on the shoulders of the local industries. Those who did not go to war had worked long hard hours in cramped and often dangerous conditions, providing the backbone to the war effort. Welders, platers and grinders provided munitions of all shapes and sizes, and many female steelworkers, filled the gaps the men had left. Even the heavy industry of the rolling mills and forges continued.

After the war, the wives of Parson Cross turned their hands to the bakeries (Fletchers and Sunblest) and confectionery (Bachelors and Bassetts). Many continued working in the steel industry, although most of the skilled work went back to the men, and the women picked up the more routine roles.

Many of the children born in the immediate post-war years, were the first phase of Baby Boomers. For these families Parson cross was an idyll. First-class social housing, blending into a lush green belt.

In September 1955, the Parish Council expressed interest in acquiring certain sites for “allotment purposes”. The estate is referred to as “Ecclesfield Parson Cross” by the architect. Listed below are the proposed sites:

- Site A, Mansell Road West Side of street, in centre.

- Site B, Knutton Crescent, north side of Eightfoot walking towards Chaucer Road

- Site C, Knutton Road behind Margetson Shops (now SOAR Works)

- Site D, Adlington Road, North of Deerlands Ave junction.

- Site E, Holgate Crescent, North of Deerlands Avenue junction.

- Site F, Rokeby Road, Just east of junction with Turie Avenue.

- Site G, Colley Crescent, north-east of Rokeby Drive junction

- Site H, Monteney Road, South side of street at Wordsworth Avenue end.

- Site J, North side of street at Morrall Road end

In the following exchange of letters, it was suggested that, rather than allotment sites, they should be used for the construction of garages; Site B was suggested as a children’s playground site.

Sheffield Corporation asked if they could acquire Site C for a “Public Works Depot” (in the 1960s, this was indeed the local PWD site) and Site G for a “Sunday School” Site C is now home to SOAR Works, an Enterprise Centre providing office, artist and workshop space to local businesses and individuals.

The local cinema was The Ritz. Situated at the junction of Wordsworth Avenue and Southey Green Road, it opened in 1939 and closed as a cinema in 1966, although it continued as a bingo hall until 2001. The final film was shown on Wednesday 9 November 1966 – Kim Novak & Richard Johnson in “The Amorous Adventures Of Moll Flanders”. During the early years of the new millennium, the building was allowed to fall into ruin and became the victim of graffiti artists and arsonists alike. In the closing weeks of 2012, the bulldozers moved in and began dismantling this former "Palace of Laughter", completing the task in early 2013.

=== Notable residents ===
Valerie Howarth, Baroness Howarth of Breckland OBE (born 5 September 1940, died 23 March 2025), Parson Cross's most celebrated daughter, was born and grew up on Buchanan Rd, and took the title of "Baroness of Parson Cross in the County of South Yorkshire" when she was made a life peer in 2001. She attended Southey School until the age of 11 when she passed her Eleven-plus and transferred to the Abbeydale Girls Grammar School. After studies at University of Leicester, she became a family caseworker and manager in Lambeth, then head of Social Services for Brent Council. She later worked alongside Esther Rantzen as the first CEO of Childline. She was a campaigner and active in many charities.

Parson Cross’s most famous son is Baron David Blunkett PC (born 6 June 1947), who, despite being born totally blind, carved out a successful political career, rising to the post of Education Secretary and eventually Home Secretary. He announced that he would be retiring as an MP at the 2015 election.

Olympic silver medallist Sheila Sherwood (Long Jump, Mexico 1968) is also a native of the estate. As Sheila Parkin, she attended local secondary modern school “Yew Lane”, later renamed "Yewlands", where, at the age of fifteen, she was appointed as Head-Girl. After a successful set of O-Level results, she transferred to a grammar school in nearby Ecclesfield to study for her A-Levels.

=== Redevelopment ===
In the late 1990s, the housing Authorities instigated a programme of housing reduction. Many of the two-bedroom houses, especially those on and around Buchanan Road, were demolished, and the land they occupied left to grow wild. In 2012 some of these sites were developed as new housing facilities.

This was followed by the demolition of the Malthouses (houses built by World War II Italian POWs constructed from reinforced concrete sections) on Mansel Crescent, Mansel Avenue and Wordsworth Avenue.

The long-term effect of this programme, still underway in 2009, is to create a less crowded, greener environment for future generations.

In June 2008, Radio Sheffield broadcast a play about the impact of this regeneration. Entitled The View, it featured four fictional characters and was used as a catalyst for an invited audience of Parson Cross residents to comment on the plans and to talk about the issues raised. Much of the content was inspired by the writings of present and former residents on the Parson Cross section of the Sheffield Forum, a website for all things Sheffield.

In 2010 a book about growing up in Parson Cross in the fifties, “Get Thi Neck Weshed” by Graham Shepherd, was published by ACMRetro, specialists in Sheffield’s post war social history. This was followed in 2011 by “Gee’or Ruwerin” by Steve Bush, a similar account but based this time centred around a 1960s childhood. Both books are unashamedly written in the Parson Cross vernacular and contain a wealth of local idioms.

Origin of the word “Eightfoot”

A letter from the Parish Clerk to County Hall in Wakefield, January 1954, refers to the pathways between houses on Parson Cross, Wordsworth Avenue, Colley Avenue and Rokeby Rd, as “Eight-foot Pathways”. This was the name given to these walkways by the site architects. The paths are still known as “Eightfoots” by local residents.
