= Howard Street, Sheffield =

Street in Sheffield, England

Coordinates: 53.3783°N 1.4657°W

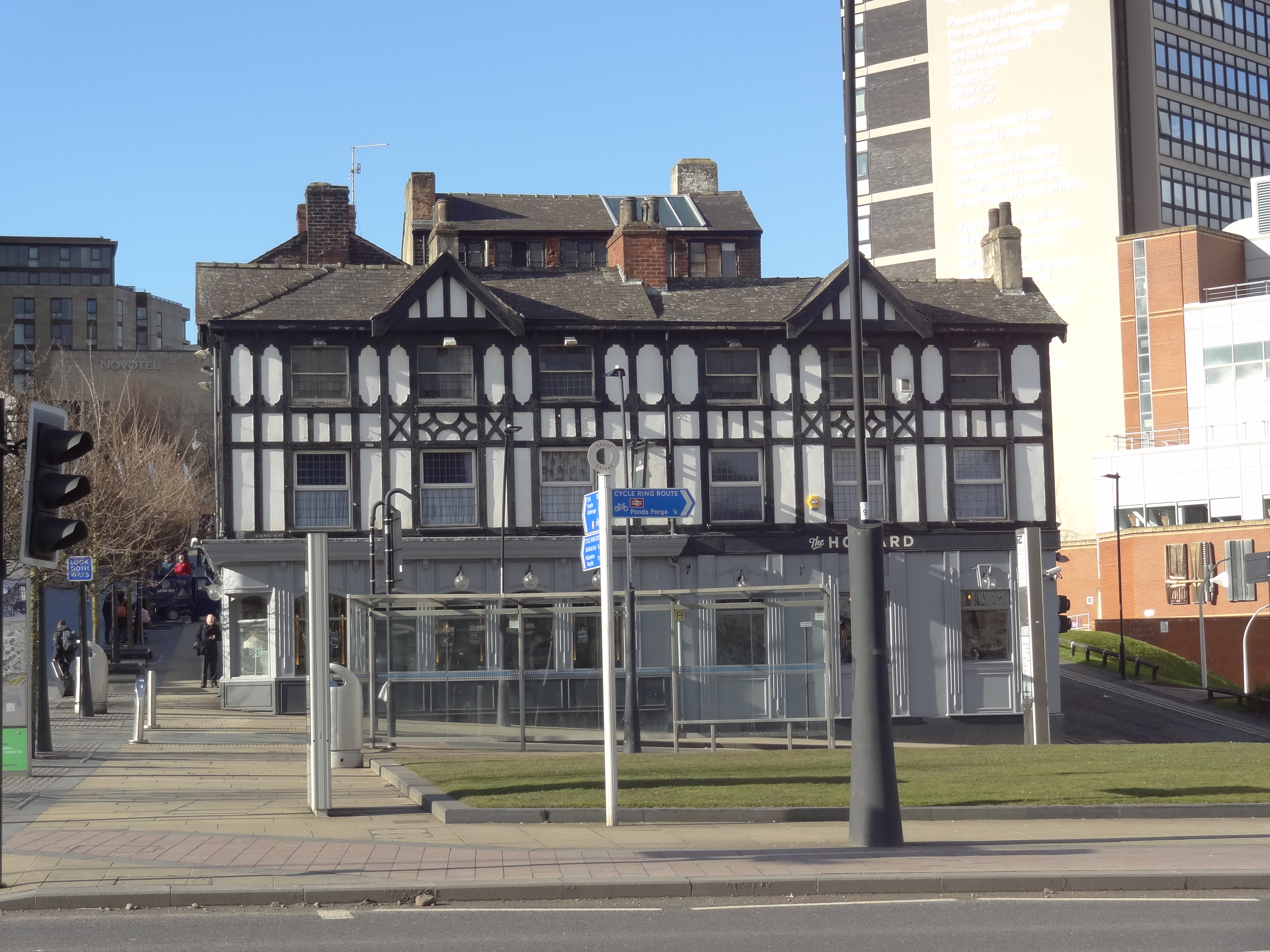
The Howard Hotel at the bottom of Howard Street

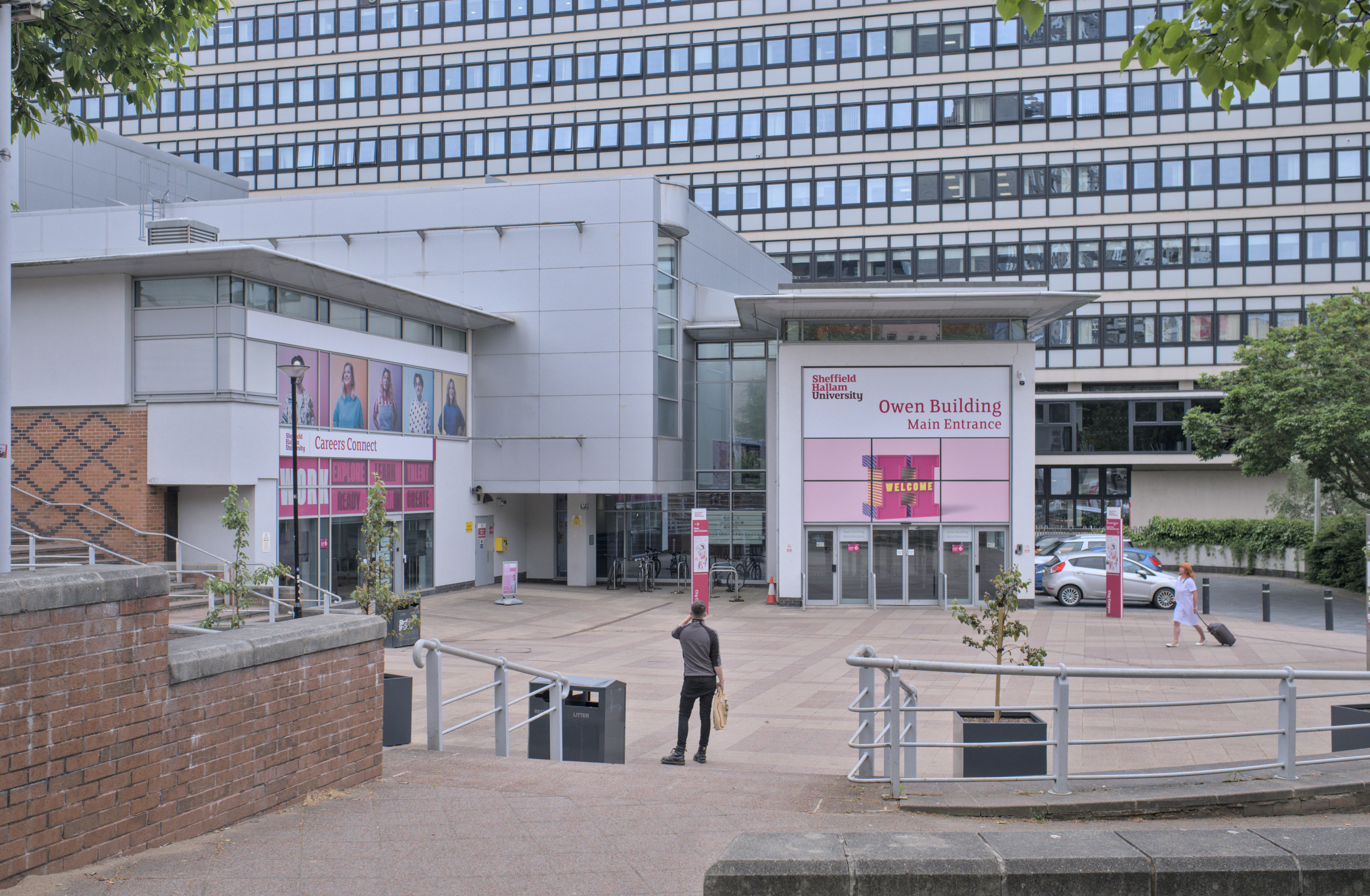
Hallam University's Owen building and Hallam Square

Howard Street is a street in the city centre of Sheffield, England. It provides a short link between Sheaf Square and one of the great road arteries, Arundel Gate. The street was pedestrianised in 2005 so as to provide safe haven to pedestrians using the railway station. Howard Street is paved all through in granite.

The top end of Howard Street was pedestrianised in the late 1990s and transformed into Hallam Square. Hallam Square is a half amphitheatre shaped plaza with seating and a water feature.

To the bottom end of Howard Street is the Howard Hotel, a half timbered public house, An Artists Collective/Gallery and shop called the Silverworks that showcases local artists and sells their work, artists include Patrick Amber, Cassie Limb and Gordie Cavill, there is also Hallam University's Science Park. Along the southern side of the street are terraced houses.
