= Firth Park (public park) =

Park in Sheffield, South Yorkshire, England

Coordinates: 53.4154494°N 1.446593°W

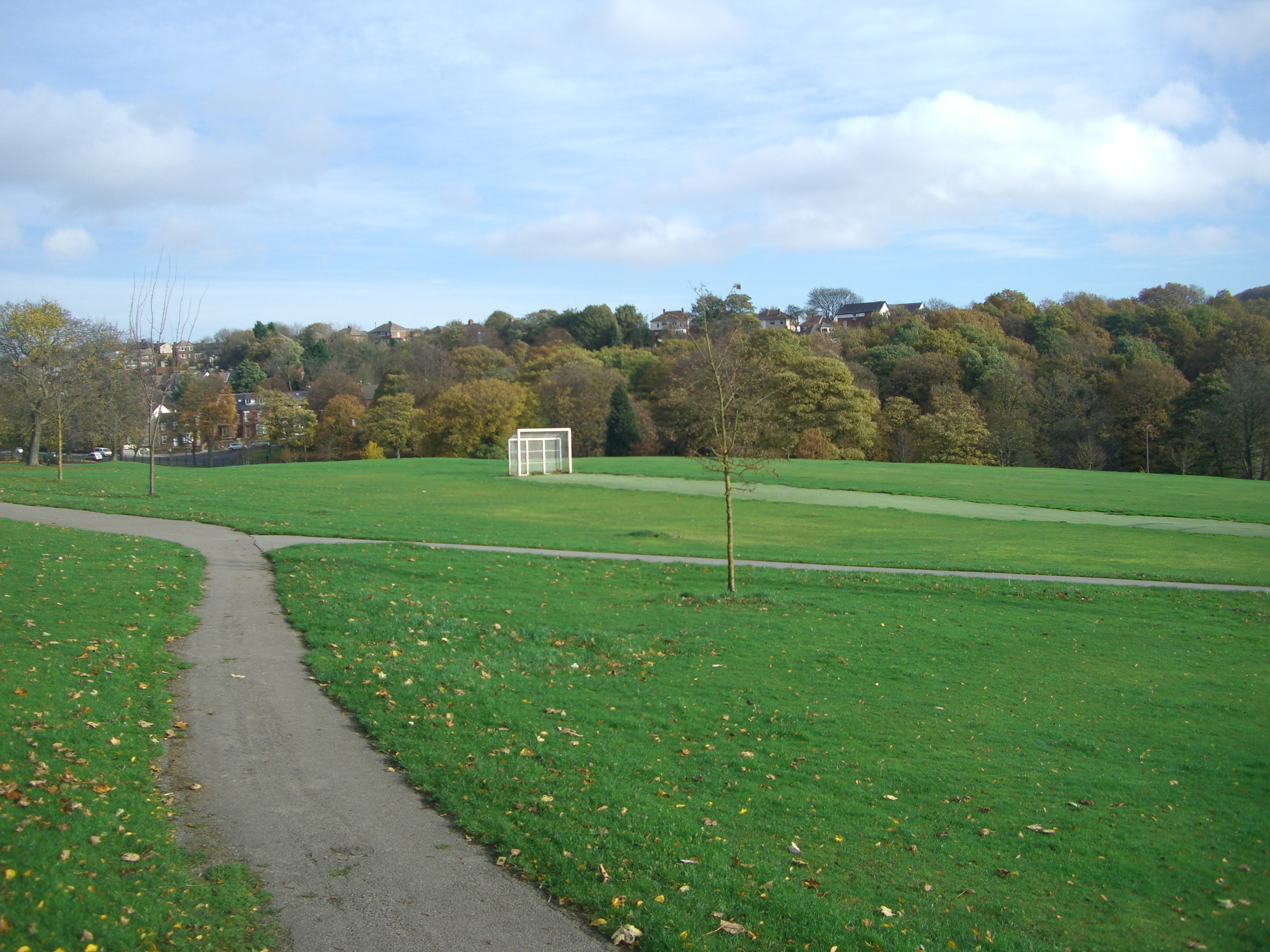
The park seen from the Vivian Road entrance with Hinde Common Wood in the background

Firth Park is a public park in the Firth Park area of the City of Sheffield in England. It is located 2.33 miles (3.75 km) north-northeast of the city centre. The main entrance to the park is on Hucklow Road although there are several entrances on Firth Park Road to the east and one on Vivian Road to the south. Established in 1875, the park gave its name to the Sheffield suburb of Firth Park, a social housing estate constructed around the area of the park in the 1920s and 1930s.

== History ==
=== Grand opening ===
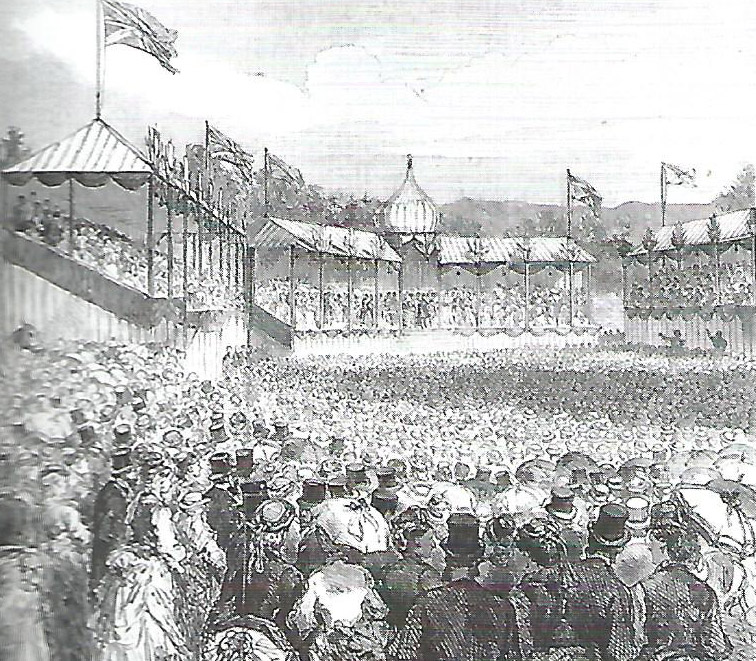
The ceremonial opening of Firth Park on 16 April 1875

The 36-acre park was a gift from the Sheffield industrialist Mark Firth. The land had originally been part of the grounds of Page Hall (now Abbey Grange Nursing Home) which Firth had bought in 1873.

The park was opened on 16 August 1875 by Albert Edward, the then Prince of Wales, and Princess Alexander. The royal couple were the guests of Firth, staying at his mansion Oakbrook in the city. The weekly newspaper The Graphic reported that the royal visitors arrived at Firth Park in a procession of forty carriages from Victoria station with the band of the Hallamshire Volunteer Rifle Corps playing the "Firth Park March". The royal couple were seated in a temporary pavilion designed to look like a Turkish minaret and 15,000 school children were assembled in front to sing the national anthem. At the time of the royal opening much of the park was still unfinished and Firth spent an additional £9,000 before a second ceremony was performed on 22 August 1876 to mark the completion.

In its early days the park had a pavilion, lodge, bandstand, drinking fountain and ornamental lake with ducks. The park was very popular at this time with an estimated 1,000 people visiting daily in spring and summer and as many as 30,000 on Good Fridays. In 1908 the Firth Park Bowling Club was established. After the Second World War the lake was renovated and became a shallow paddling and boating pool, used extensively by the Sheffield Ship Model Society. The pool was eventually filled in and landscaped.

The lodge has a striking clock tower which in its early days stood at the main entrance to the park at the then farthest extent of Firth Park Road. The lodge incorporated a park keeper's house and refreshment rooms. In June 1973 the building was designated a Grade II listed building, and today it provides community facilities, having been refurbished after an arson attack in 1995. In 1949 the main entrance to the park was moved onto Hucklow Road near the main shopping area of the newly established suburb of Firth Park. Formal gardens were also laid out at this time, and in the 1970s a children's playground was constructed.

== Wooded area ==
The park incorporates two wooded areas. The most important of these is Hinde Common Wood on its eastern flank. It is an ancient woodland which was first mentioned in documents in 1637, it stands on the eastern side of Firth Park Road, separated from the rest of the park by that thoroughfare. The wood was not integrated into the park until 1909 when it became public property. In recent years Hinde Common Wood has undergone a restoration programme which has encouraged the regeneration of native trees, while non-native and invasive species have been removed. Access to the wood has also been improved by upgrading paths and providing additional seating.

On the western side of the park is Brushes Wood, a small wooded area in a shallow valley close to Hucklow Road and the Brushes allotments.

== Present day ==
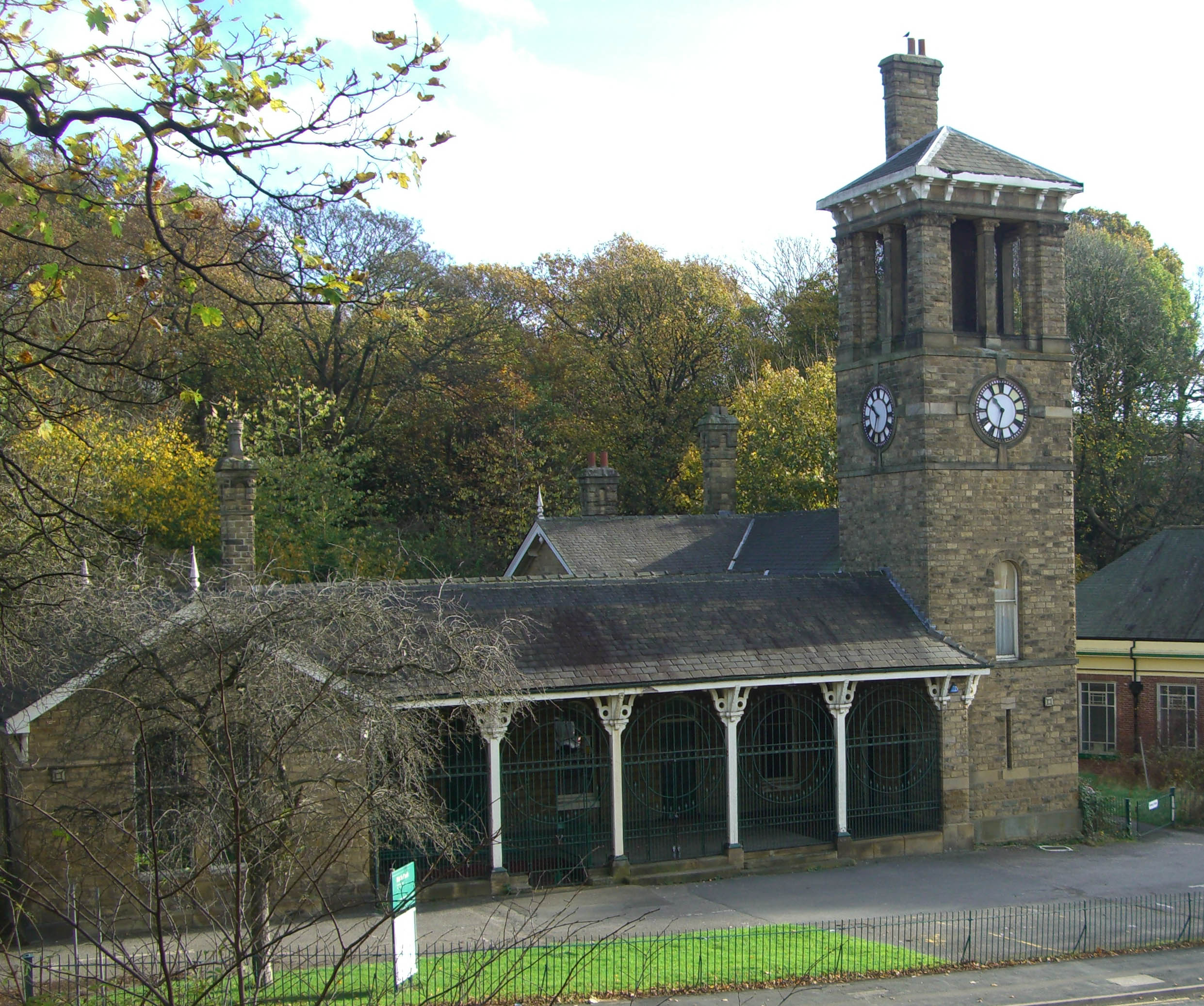
The lodge on Firth Park Road was the original main gate for the park.

In the 1980s the maintenance and upkeep of the park was scaled back and Firth Park entered a period of deterioration and neglect. In 2000 the Friends Of Firth Park group was formed to help regenerate the park. This included the opening of a new First Start Centre in 2005 which incorporated a toddler group, drop-in nursery and a community snack bar known as Henry's Café. Today the park also has a multi-use games area that includes facilities for football, hockey, basketball and cricket as well as a children's playground and bowling green.
