= Neil Anderson (Idaho politician) =

American politician from Idaho

Member of the Idaho House of Representatives from District 31 Seat A
- In office December 1, 2012 – December 1, 2020
- Preceded by: Marc Gibbs
- Succeeded by: David Cannon

Personal details
- Born: February 21, 1947 (age 79) Rexburg, Idaho, U.S.
- Party: Republican
- Education: Ricks College; Idaho State University
- Website: andersonforthehouse.org

Neil Alan Anderson (born February 21, 1947) is a Republican Idaho State Representative since 2012 representing District 31 in the A seat.

== Education ==
Anderson earned his associate degree in mathematics from Ricks College and his bachelor's degree in business from Idaho State University.

== Elections ==
District 31 House Seat A - Part of Bingham County
Year	Candidate	Votes	Pct	Candidate	Votes	Pct	Candidate	Votes	Pct	Candidate	Votes	Pct
2012 Primary	Neil Anderson	2,497	39.8%	R. David Moore	1,408	22.4%	Robert Butler	1,268	20.2%	Mike Duff	1,099	17.5%
2012 General	Neil Anderson	12,414	72.6%	Barbara Ann Clark	4,681	27.4%						
2014 Primary	Neil Anderson (incumbent)	5,117	100.0%									
2014 General	Neil Anderson (incumbent)	9,139	100.0%									
2016 Primary	Neil Anderson (incumbent)	1,855	67.4%	David Esplin	898	32.6%						
2016 General	Neil Anderson (incumbent)	14,183	100.0%									
