= Shirecliffe =

Suburb of Sheffield, England

Coordinates: 53.412496°N 1.4729°W

- Location within South Yorkshire
- Population: 4.200 https://www.ons.gov.uk
- OS grid reference: SK351907
- Metropolitan borough: Sheffield
- Metropolitan county: South Yorkshire
- Region: Yorkshire and the Humber
- Country: England
- Sovereign state: United Kingdom
- Post town: SHEFFIELD
- Postcode district: S5 & S3
- Dialling code: 0114
- Police: South Yorkshire
- Fire: South Yorkshire
- Ambulance: Yorkshire
- UK Parliament: Sheffield Brightside and Hillsborough

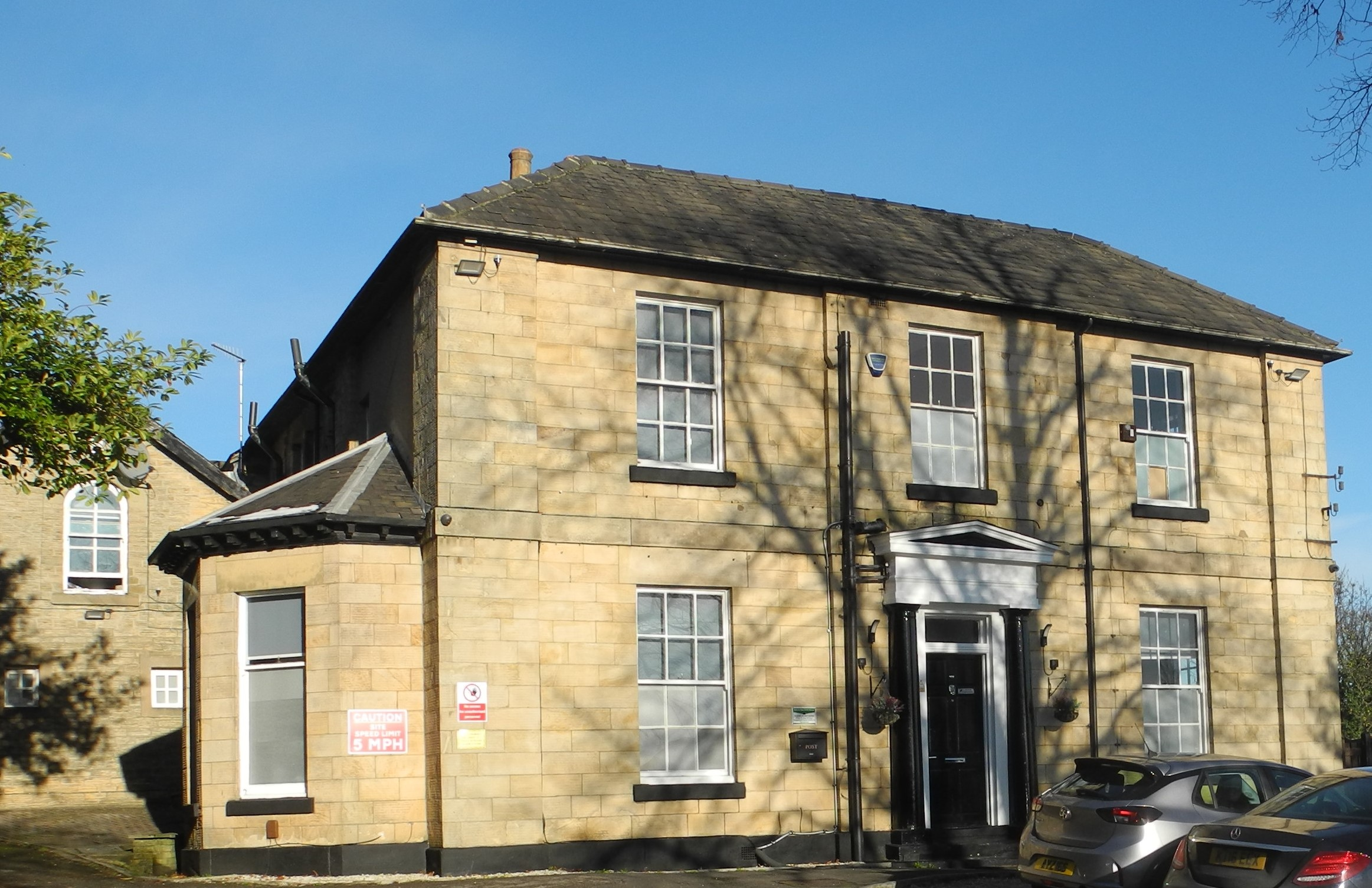
Shirecliffe House is now a guest house called the Diplomats Lodge.

Shirecliffe is a suburb of the City of Sheffield. It lies about 2 miles (3.2 km) north of the city centre; it is now a residential neighbourhood consisting mostly of public housing. In the past it was a rural area made up of farmland and scattered small country houses. The name of the suburb derives from "Scir-clifff", meaning a bright steep hillside: this is appropriate as it is located at the top of a steep escarpment which rises out of the Don valley at Neepsend.

== History ==
The rural hamlet of "Shiercliffe" started to develop during Anglo-Saxon times and was part of the Saxon manor of Grimesthou (now Grimesthorpe). After the Norman Conquest it became one of several sub manors dependent on Sheffield Castle created by the Norman Lords, the Furnivals, for their principal supporters during the conflict. Shirecliffe was granted to the de Mounteney family of Cowley Manor at Ecclesfield.

The de Mounteneys, originally from Montigny in Normandy, turned much of the area into a deer park with hunting rights approved by royal charter, it would later become known as Old Park Wood. Sir Robert de Mounteney went on crusade with Gerard de Furnival at the end of the 12th century and at that time the de Mounteneys were the second most important family in Hallamshire after the Furnivals.

The Mounteneys continued to own the manor of Shirecliffe up until the 16th century, building the manor house, Shirecliffe Hall, which stood on the west side of present day Shirecliffe Road near its junction with Shirecliffe Lane. The manor of Shirecliffe was sold to George Talbot, 6th Earl of Shrewsbury in 1572 although the hall remained a separate and desirable residence into the 17th century with the dissenting minister Rowland Hancock living there, followed by Sheffield's leading attorney Joseph Banks. Around this time the deer were removed from the adjacent 143 acre deer park and it was turned into a coppice wood and is thus shown on William Fairbank's map of 1795. Joseph Hunter in his 1819 book "Hallamshire" said that there was nothing remaining of the ancient manor house at the time of writing that book although a replacement was built close by in the 18th century.

=== Shirecliffe House ===
Shirecliffe House is the only listed building in the suburb. It is Grade II listed. It was built around 1840 as a private house and stands at the junction of Shirecliffe Lane and Shirecliffe Road. It suffered bomb damage during the Second World War and was repaired and extended in 1950. It became a remand home for boys and then in the 1980s became part of Shirecliffe College, Department of Management. The building has now been converted into a guest house known as the Diplomat's Lodge.

=== Modern times ===
Shirecliffe remained a mostly rural area into the 20th century with the 1905 map showing a scattering of larger houses such as The Woodlands, The Oaks and Selwood Lodge which all still stand today on Shirecliffe Road. The second Shirecliffe Hall (replacement for the old manor house) was demolished in the 20th century. The Great Park Wood was finally felled during the 1920s with much of the area being turned into a landfill site; however a remnant of it does remain off Herries Road as it descends to Owlerton, this is Scraith Wood which is recognised as an ancient woodland. During World War II, anti-aircraft emplacements were set up in Shirecliffe to take advantage of the hilly terrain.

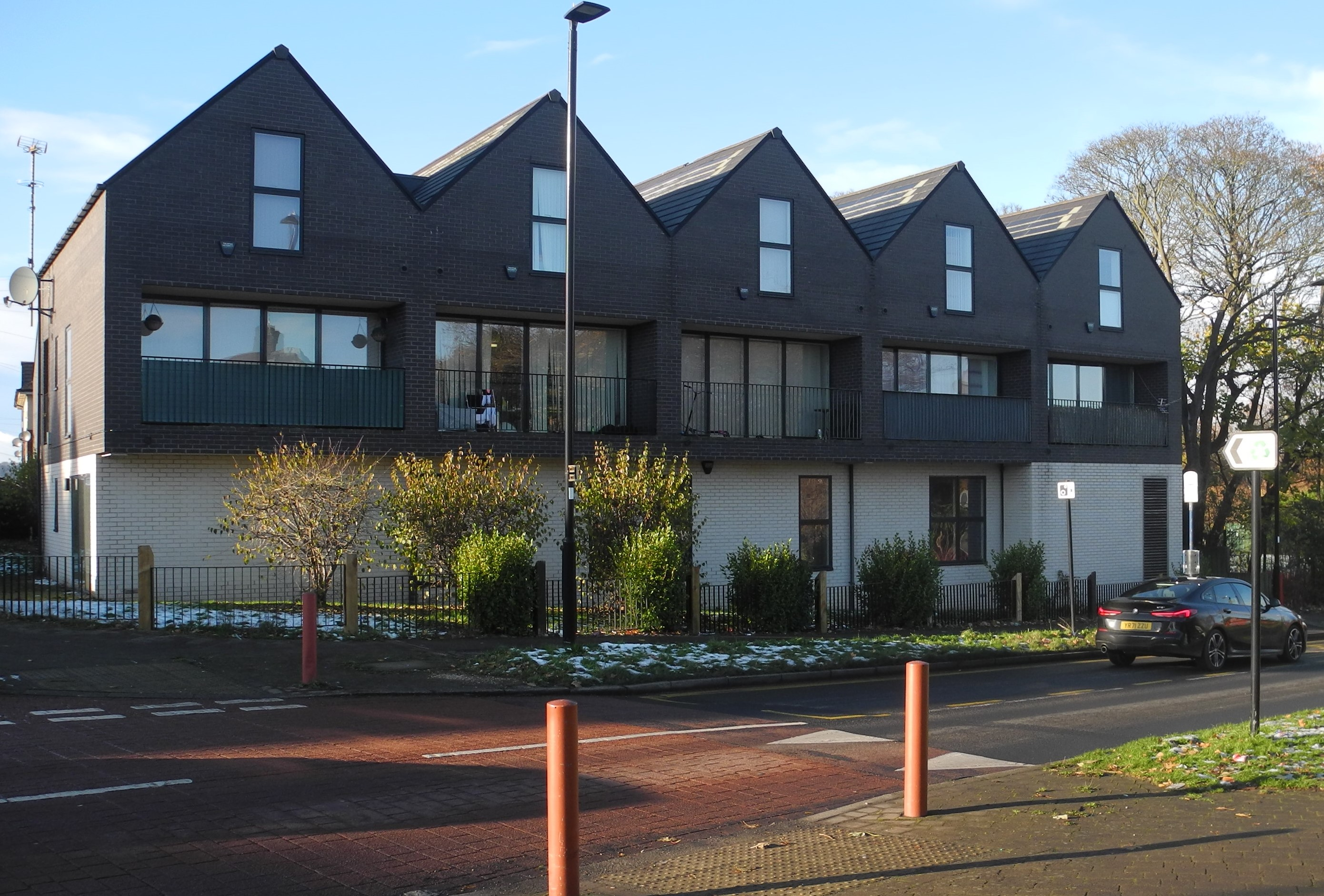
New housing on Shirecliffe Road which won an award in the 2010 Housing Design Awards.

A major programme of house building was started in the area by Sheffield City Council in the interwar period which turned the rural area into a residential suburb. The development included the building of two pubs, the Devonshire Arms on Herries Road and the Timber Top which was built on the ruins of Cockshutt farm on Shirecliffe Road. The Timber Top has closed in recent years and is now a car wash facility. In 2010 a programme of replacing certain pockets of aging housing with new developments was undertaken in Shirecliffe. 79 new dwellings were built in 16 locations by the contractors Henry Boot plc in conjunction with the architects Stephenson Bell, the development won a nomination in the 2010 Housing Design Awards.

Shirecliffe College opened in 1968 and closed in 1998, it stood at the highest point of Shirecliffe Road and was visible from most parts of Sheffield. It was a vocational establishment which taught trades to young people. It was demolished and replaced by housing.

== Amenities ==
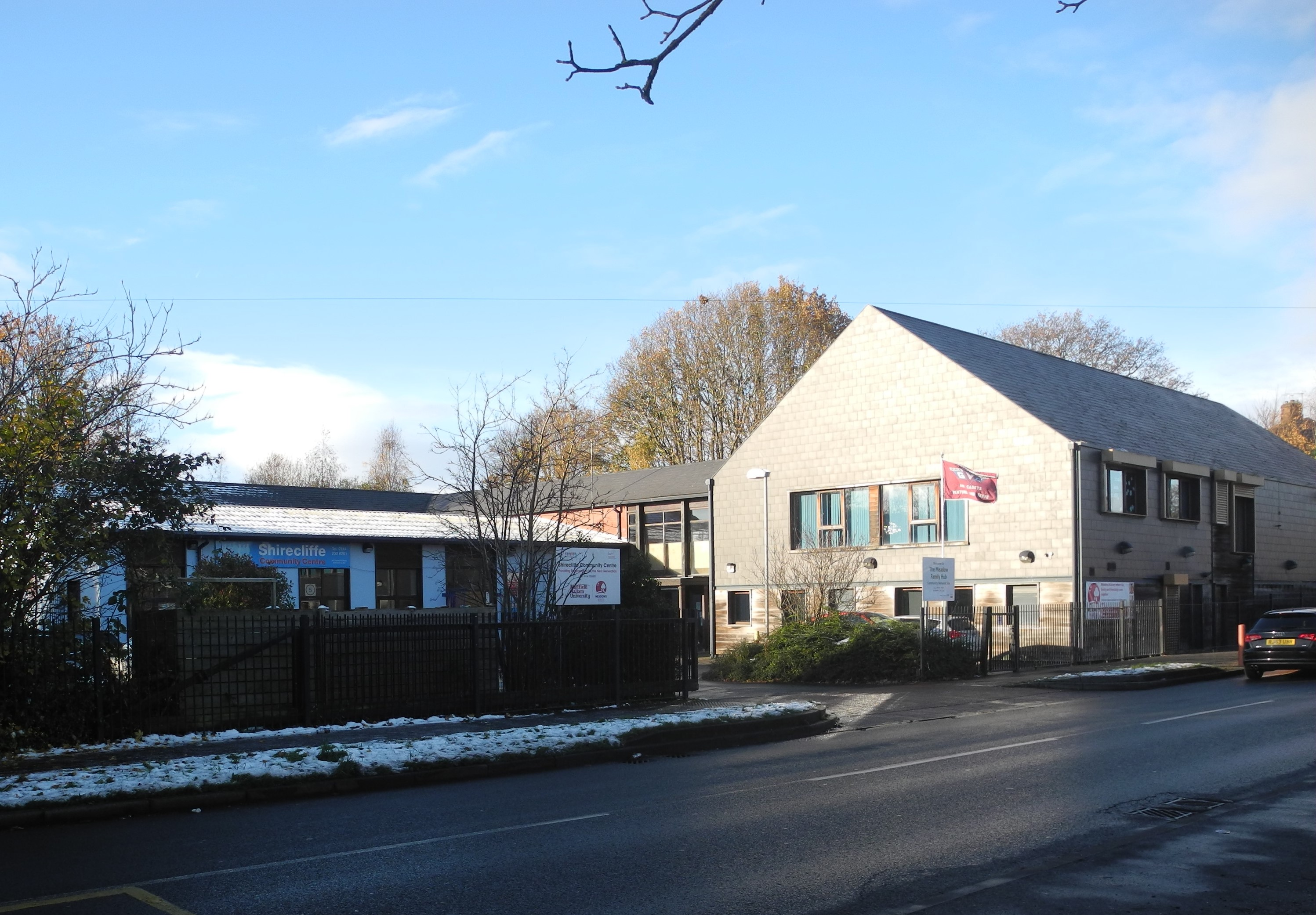
Shirecliffe community centre and Meadows Nursery on Shirecliffe Road.

The main shopping area for the suburb is the Herries Road shops which stand near the roundabout at the junction of Shirecliffe Road and Herries Road. There are smaller shopping areas on Teynham Road and Longley Avenue West.

The principal outdoor recreation area in Shirecliffe is Busk Meadows Park, which has a children's playground, a foothall pitch with raised sides, and an area of woodland. Sheffield United F.C. have their football academy on Shirecliffe Road: they moved there in 2002 but the site was a sports ground long before that.

Other notable sites in the suburb include a Household Waste Recycling Centre on Longley Avenue West, run by Sheffield Council. This has caused some animosity among local residents who feel the centre should not be based in a residential area, but promises to move the centre to a more appropriate place have come to nothing.

The nearest GP practices for Shirecliffe residents are just outside the suburb with the Norwood Medical Centre, Pitsmoor Surgery and Southey Green Medical Centre all being less than a mile away. The main primary school for the area is the Watercliffe Meadow Community Primary School on Boynton Road while the Parkwood E-ACT Academy on Longley Avenue West is the principal secondary school for the area, it was built on the site of the old Herries School. The Meadows nursery school, a new facility at the heart of the community, opened in Spring 2021, it is a co-operation between SHU, the Council and Save the Children. The Community Centre stands on Shirecliffe Road. It was extended and renovated in 2007: the £1.25 million refit included a two storey office block to the rear which can be rented out to raise funds for the centre.
