= Midcity Tower =

Coordinates: 53.378°N 1.471°W

- Interactive map of the Midcity Tower area

General information
- Status: Approved
- Type: Residential, Retail
- Location: Sheffield, England
- Construction started: Estimated 2010
- Estimated completion: 2013

Height
- Roof: 65 m (213 ft)
- Top floor: 62 m (203 ft)

Technical details
- Floor count: 19 above ground, 1 below ground
- Floor area: 540 m^{2} (5,800 sq ft)

Design and construction
- Architect: Hadfield Cawkwell Davidson
- Developer: W D King Group

Midcity Tower (previously known by its street address, 23 Furnival Gate) is an approved tower in Sheffield, England. Plans were submitted in 2005 and accepted later the same year. Construction is yet to start as of 2016, and proposed plans would mean the demolition of 'The Nelson' public house.

If completed, the tower would be 65 m (213 ft) tall, with the top floor at a height of 62 m (205 ft). The proposed building would contain 20 floors, with 19 being above ground and one below, as well as two elevators. The ground floor would have a concourse and retail space, the floor below ground having storage space and all other floors containing a total of 90 apartments.

The architect for the planned building is Hadfield Cawkwell Davidson, with the developers designated as W D King Group.
