= Neil Anderson (writer) =

English writer and journalist

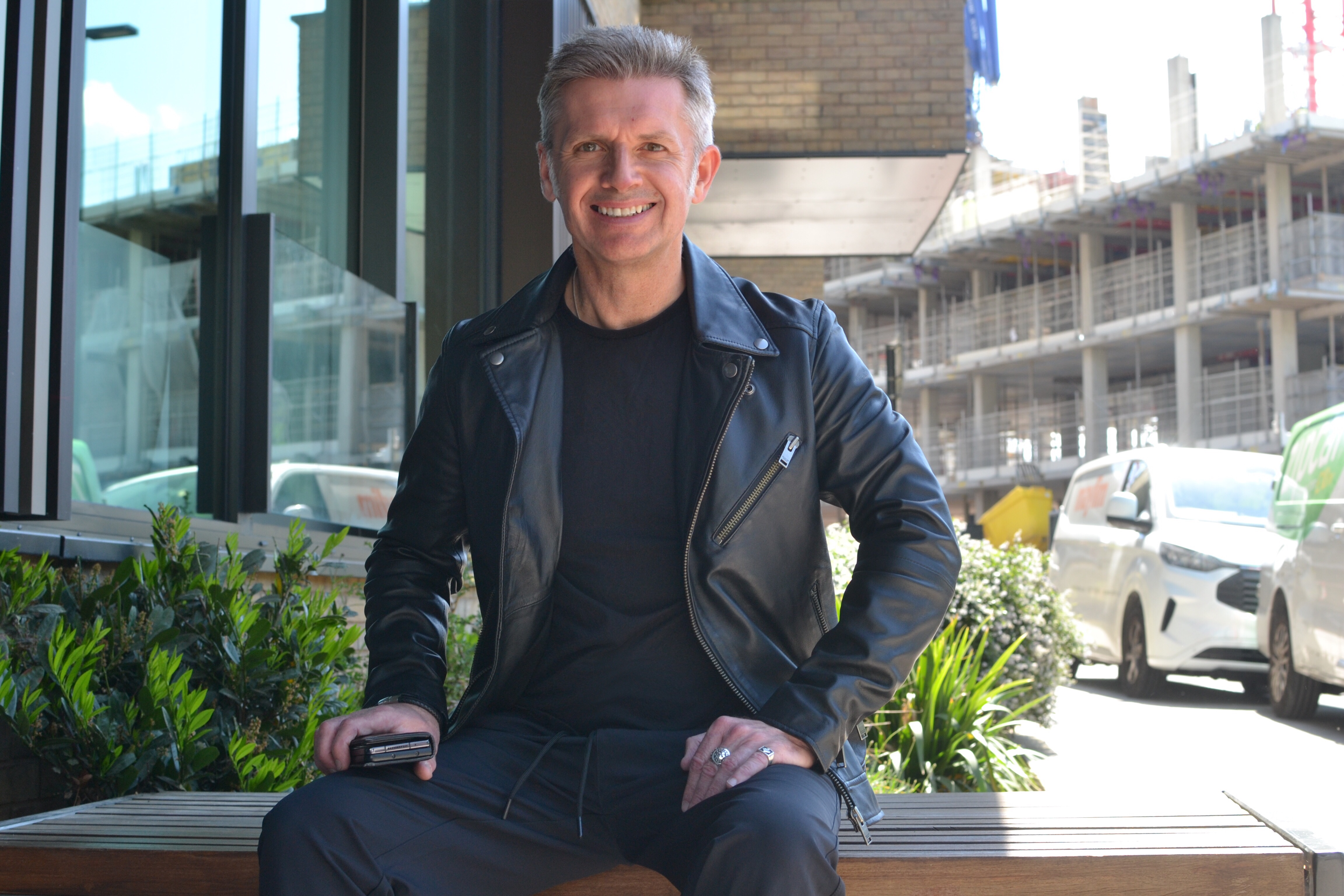
- Neil Anderson in 2025
- Born: Sheffield, United Kingdom
- Occupation: Writer, historian journalist
- Notable works: Dirty Stop Out's Guide series

Website
- neilandersonmedia.com

Neil Anderson is a British writer, historian and journalist. He worked as a columnist for the Sheffield Telegraph. Anderson wrote Sheffield’s Date With Hitler, Signing On For the Devil, and Take It to the Limit. He is also known for his Dirty Stop Out’s Guide series of the British cities.

== Early life and education ==
Anderson was born in Sheffield, and attended Sheffield Hallam University.

== Career ==
While attending university, Anderson got a job at Sheffield City Hall in its publicity office. After graduating, he continued to work for city hall until 2000, later moving in the press office.

Anderson worked at the Sheffield Telegraph as a columnist for more than 10 years and also wrote for The Independent and The Big Issue. He is a regular contributor to the music magazine Vive Le Rock.

In 1995, Anderson began work on the Dirty Stop Out’s Guide of Sheffield documenting the city's cultural life, night life, and venues. This led to a series of Dirty Stop Out’s Guide series including Birmingham, Manchester, Liverpool, Coventry, Barnsley and Chesterfield. In 2010, Anderson published Take It to the Limit about the Sheffield club The Limit, which operated on the city's West Street from 1978 to 1991. The same year, he also wrote Signing on for the Devil, chronicling Sheffield's heavy metal music scene in the 1980s.

== Works ==
=== Books ===
- Take It to the Limit (2009)
- Shopaholic's Guide To 1970s Sheffield (2009)
- Dirty Stop Out's Guide To 1970s Sheffield (2010)
- Sheffield's Date With Hitler (2010)
- Signing on for the Devil (2010)
- Facts, Figures & Fallacious Goings-On in Sheffield (2011)
- Dirty Stop Out's Guide to 1960s Sheffield (2011)
- Dirty Stop Out's Guide to 1980s Sheffield (2011)
- Dirty Stop Out's Guide to 1950s Sheffield (2012)
- Sheffield City Hall (2012)
- Forgotten Memories From A Forgotten Blitz (2012)
- No Siesta 'Til Club Fiesta (2012)
- Dirty Stop Out's Guide to 1980s Chesterfield (2013)
- Dirty Stop Out's Guide to 1990s Sheffield (2013)
- The Atkinsons Story (2013)
- Dirty Stop Out's Guide to 1970s Chesterfield (2014)
- Defiant! Sheffield Blitz 75th The Definitive Visuals Guide (2015)
- Dirty Stop Out's Guide to Working Mens' Clubs (2017).

=== Articles ===
- Anderson, Neil. 2009. “Neil Anderson Takes It to the Limit.” BBC Sheffield & South Yorkshire, October 28, 2009.
- Anderson, Neil. 2025. “Sheffield Blitz Secrets Unearthed: 15 Years of Research Reveals the Truth.” The Star, Sheffield, February 26, 2025.
