= Burngreave =

District of Sheffield South Yorkshire, England

Coordinates: 53.391°N 1.453°W

- Location within Sheffield
- Population: 27,481 (Ward. 2011)
- OS grid reference: SK363884
- Metropolitan borough: City of Sheffield
- Metropolitan county: South Yorkshire
- Region: Yorkshire and the Humber
- Country: England
- Sovereign state: United Kingdom
- Post town: SHEFFIELD
- Postcode district: S3, S4
- Dialling code: 0114
- Police: South Yorkshire
- Fire: South Yorkshire
- Ambulance: Yorkshire
- UK Parliament: Sheffield Brightside and Hillsborough

Burngreave is an inner city district of Sheffield, South Yorkshire, England lying north of the city centre. The population of the ward taken at the 2011 census was 27,481. It started to develop in the second half of the 19th century. Prior to this, this area was mostly covered by Burnt Greave wood. Most of the area of the wood is covered by Burngreave Cemetery which was built in 1860 (consecrated 1861) and extended in the early 1900s. Grimesthorpe Lane, which runs through Burngreave, is a very old road that follows the course of the Roman Rig, a man-made defensive ridge—probably built by the Celtic Brigantes tribe—that used to run from near the Wicker to Mexborough.

== History ==
=== Prehistory ===
Although there is not much physical evidence of early settlement in Burngreave, we do know that an Iron Age fort was discovered in Roe Woods. The people who built this may have been from a Celtic tribe, the Brigantes. In the early 20th century you could still see the circular banks of the fort they had built. In 1922, however, it was destroyed to build a sports ground (now owned by Sheffield United FC).

=== Roman period ===
There is very little evidence of the Roman presence in Burngreave. A hoard of 13 coins was found in Pitsmoor in 1906.

=== Middle Ages ===
Around the mid 9th century the north of England fell under Danish control. Several local place names suggest Viking settlement in the area. Osgathorpe (an old Danish name) means the farm belonging to Osga and Grimesthorpe means Grims outlying farm. From this we can imagine that the area was occupied by a farming community at a time when Sheffield was still a small, insignificant place. The name of Roe Wood may possibly be derived from the old Norse word ra meaning rowan tree.

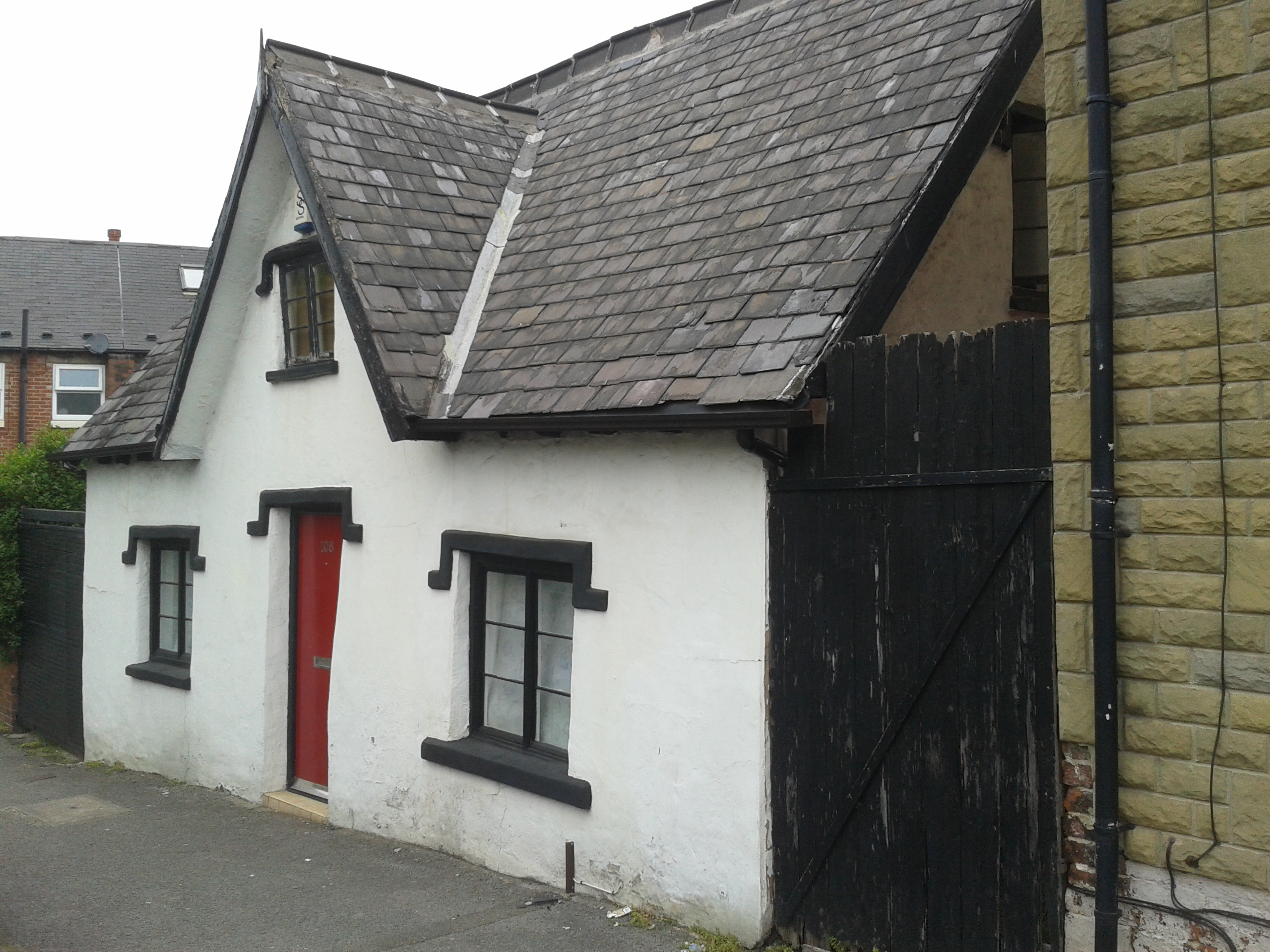
The Tudor White House on Andover Street, formerly a fish and chip shop

In the 12th century, a local lord of the manor founded a hospital in the area, called St Leonards. Although there is no trace of it remaining, the name has been passed on to streets in the vicinity, called Spital Hill and Spital Lane (as in hospital).

In the 13th century, a Norman family called De Mounteney were prominent in the area and owned land around Shirecliffe and Grimesthorpe.

=== Early Modern period ===
In the 15th century and 16th century, Burngreave was an area of open countryside with scattered farms, fields and woodland. The name Burngreave was first recorded in 1440 as Byron Greve, meaning Bryons Wood. This is shown in early maps on the site currently occupied by Burngreave Cemetery and along Burngreave Road. During the Tudor period Sheffield began to grow but Burngreave remained on the outskirts. Looking back from the top of Pitsmoor at that time, you would have seen rolling hills and farmland leading down to Lady's Bridge where a cluster of shops and houses had developed around the market place next to Sheffield Castle.

=== Urbanisation and population growth ===
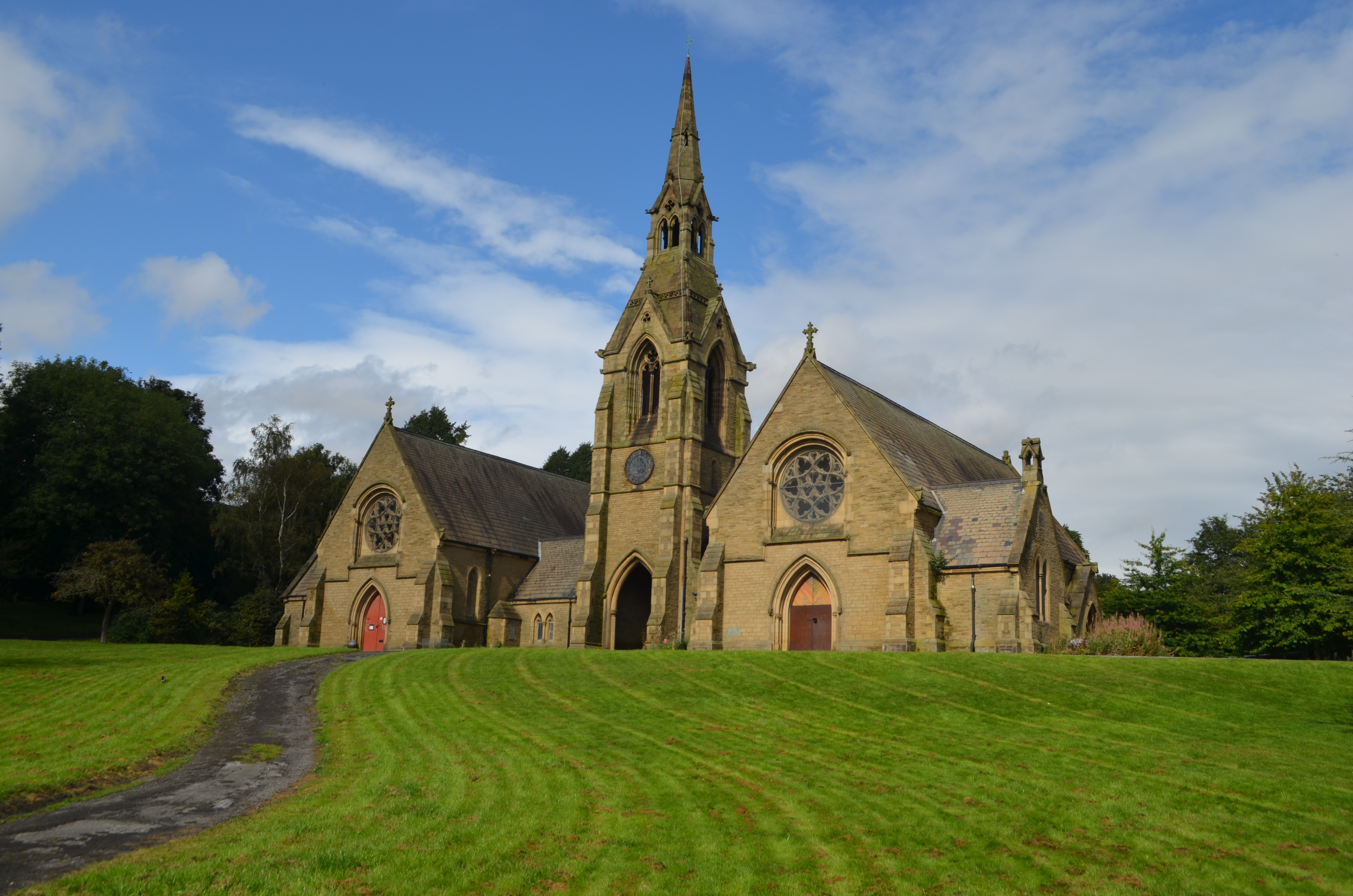
Burngreave Cemetery chapels

During the 18th century and 19th century the area remained still largely rural but industry was beginning to have an impact. In the 1820s the town of Sheffield stopped at the Wicker, below Spital Hill. Pitsmoor was just a hamlet through which the main turnpike road ran from Sheffield to Barnsley and Wakefield. Industry in the area was mostly in the form of small workshops, attached to farm buildings, producing knives and tools for a local market. There were no factories as yet. Maps from the 1830s and 40s show farmsteads, fields, some woodland and a few scattered mansions that belonged to the wealthy elite of Sheffield. At this time Burngreave was considered a highly desirable place for rich families to build new homes in. Mansions such as Osgathorpe House and Firs Hill (both now demolished) were built during this period.

By 1870 a dramatic transformation had taken place. The arrival of heavy steel and engineering industries, concentrated in the Don Valley, created jobs for migrant workers from all over England and as far away as Ireland. Development of the railways and roads also contributed to the expansion of Sheffield as a centre for craftsmanship and industry.

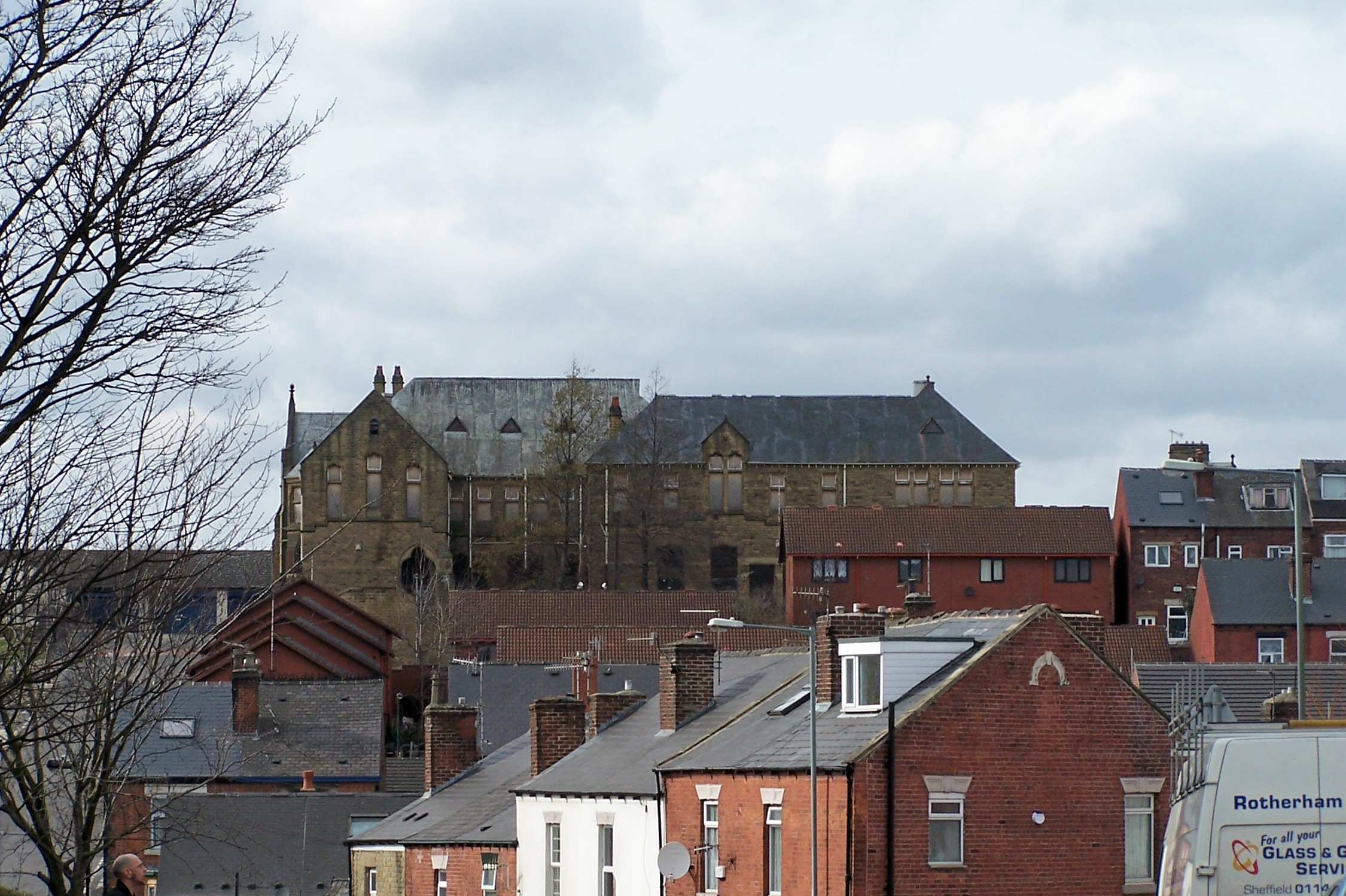
View across typical Burngreave terraced housing to Pye Bank School

Between 1820 and 1860 the population of Sheffield tripled from just over 65,000 to 185,000. In Burngreave many new houses including a group of cottages built by William Pass and occupied by miners called Pass-houses (now this location is called Passhouses Road), to accommodate the workforce of nearby industries. These were often terraced or constructed around courts and changed the character of the area completely. Neighbourhoods such as Ellesmere and Woodside became established. In the 1870s the writer Alfred Gatty described the view from Osgathorpe down into the Don Valley: “….there stands, as it were, Dante's city of Dis…masses of buildings, from the tops of which issue fire, and smoke, and steam, which cloud the whole scene, however bright the sunshine.” A drawing from 1879 of John Sorbys Spital Hill steel works captures this atmosphere completely.

Despite this grim picture of development, the higher part of Burngreave was far enough away from the noise and pollution to remain popular with Sheffield's industrialists and professional classes. Abbeyfield House was built during the late 19th century by William Pass as his own residence. Originally called Pitsmoor Abbey, it first belonged to William Pass, the owner of a local colliery, then the house was bought by a solicitor, Bernard Wake, who turned it into the family home. He altered the house greatly, adding a sundial, conservatory, greenhouses, a tennis court and outhouses. The gardens were redesigned and a boating lake created around 1883. In the early 20th century Abbeyfield House was occupied by the Greenwood family and then into the possession of the Sheffield Parks Department Training Centre.

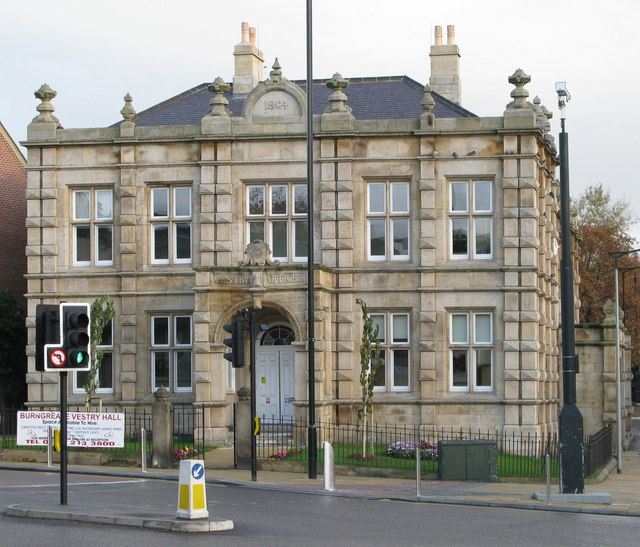
Burngreave Vestry Hall

By the late 19th century much of the former countryside of Burngreave was covered in houses. Along with these were created the Vestry Hall in 1864 to administer civic functions. Schools, churches, pubs and allotments were also created in the 19th century. The first school, Pitsmoor Village School, was opened in 1836. In 1861 Burngreave cemetery was laid out to accommodate the overflow from local church yards as these were full. A cinema and public baths were built in the early 20th century. By this time, Burngreave was a suburb of Sheffield, still prosperous and considered a pleasant place to live. It did, however, have an interesting mix of wealthy and working class residents. Occasional declines in the fortunes of the cutlery trade resulted in periods of unemployment and great hardship for many poorer families in the area. A cartoon from a newspaper in 1879 shows a soup kitchen operating from the Vestry Hall, turning away barefoot and hungry children.

=== The World Wars ===
Burngreave was badly affected by both World Wars. Zeppelin raids killed people and damaged homes in 1916. Again, in 1940, the area was heavily bombed causing much damage to homes and businesses in the area as well as killing and injuring people. In both wars men volunteered or were sent off as conscripts to fight and their places taken in the factories by women. During the Second World War children were evacuated to the countryside and those who stayed behind went to school in peoples' homes as it was considered too risky to operate schools normally.

=== Since 1945 ===
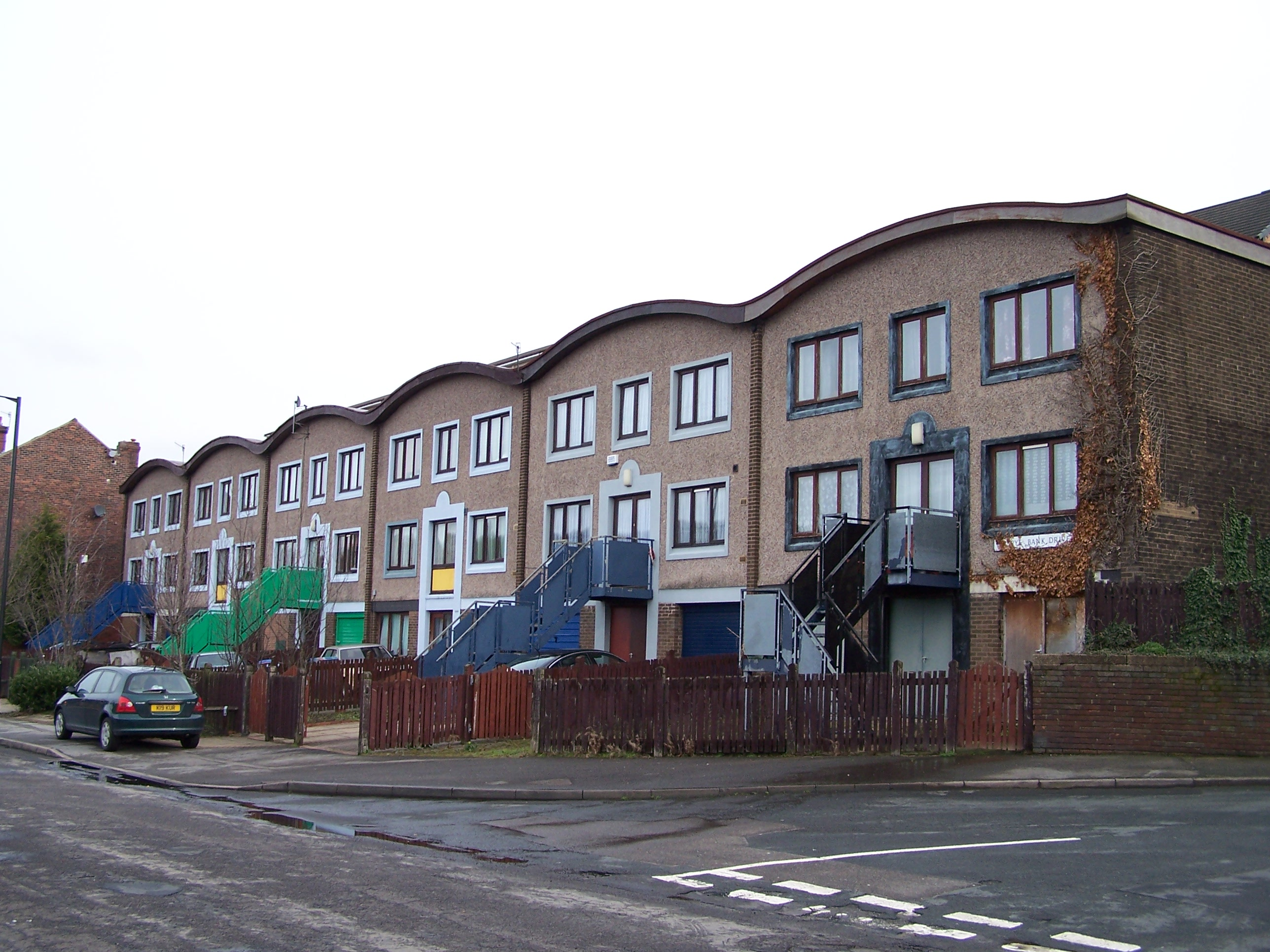
Housing on Pye Bank road, dating from the 1970s

After the Second World War housing renewal had a major impact on the area. Slum clearance started in earnest and whole neighbourhoods were decanted to other parts of the city whilst the old substandard housing was demolished. In place of the back-to-backs and terraces came new estates of council housing and flats. This changed the character of the area quite dramatically and resulted in many people moving away, never to return. The disruption that many people experienced at this time also affected the sense of community and identity of the area.

In the years immediately after the Second World War, there was a desperate need for labour in Sheffield to rebuild the city and its industries. Around this time Burngreave became home to many new immigrants, arriving from the Caribbean, Pakistan and Yemen. Many found jobs in the steel industry and the hospitals in Sheffield. Later they brought their families to join them and became part of the local community. This was the beginnings of the multicultural community that is Burngreave today. We do know, however, that Asian people had lived in the area even before this period. In Burngreave cemetery there is a grave of an Indian man killed in a colliery accident in Beighton in 1923, called Sultan Mohomed.

Since the 1990s the area has also become home to people from Chile, Somalia, Eritrea, Iraq, Sudan, and several other countries. More recently, Romani people from Slovakia have been settled there. The arrival of people from so many different backgrounds has made Burngreave one of the most ethnically diverse neighbourhoods in Sheffield. A number of different languages are spoken locally and a variety of food on offer in local restaurants and shops.

The industrial decline of the 1980s and 90s in South Yorkshire has taken its toll on Burngreave. High levels of unemployment resulted in poverty once again and a general decline in the appearance of the area. However Burngreave is now experiencing a change in fortune. This has partly resulted from the determination of local residents to stop the spiral of decay and bring about changes. In addition a huge government funded regeneration programme, Burngreave New Deal for Communities, was initiated to bring prosperity back to the area, with improvements to houses and green spaces locally. New shops have opened recently to serve the needs of different ethnic communities. In late 2011, a Tesco Extra opened on Saville Street, a couple of hundred yards from Spital Hill, the traditional shopping hotspot of the area.

In 2013 and 2014 there was unrest between Slovak Roma and Yemeni residents in the Page Hall area.

== Transport ==
Bus routes 1, 2, 88 (all provided by Stagecoach), 1a, 20, 97 and 98 (all provided by First) link Burngreave to Sheffield City Centre.
