= Areas of Sheffield =

Sheffield is a city and metropolitan borough in the north of England. Some of the areas developed from villages or hamlets, that were absorbed into Sheffield as the city grew, and thus their centres are well defined, but the boundaries of many areas are ambiguous. The city is divided into 28 electoral wards for local elections and 6 parliamentary constituencies for national elections.

== History ==
Prior to 1848 the parish of Sheffield was divided into six townships: Attercliff-cum-Darnall; Brightside Bierlow; Ecclesall Bierlow; Nether Hallam; Sheffield township; and Upper Hallam. In 1832 the new borough constituency of Sheffield was formed from these townships with the exception of most of Upper Hallam and parts of Ecclesall Bierlow. In 1843 the Municipal Borough of Sheffield was created from the whole of the six townships, becoming the City of Sheffield in 1893.

== City centre ==
The following 'quarters' of Sheffield city centre are detailed in the Sheffield City Centre Urban Design Compendium, published by Sheffield City Council in 2003–4.

- Castlegate
- Cathedral
- Cultural Industries
- Devonshire
- Heart of the City
- Kelham Island
- Riverside
- Sheaf Valley
- St George's
- St Vincent's
- The Moor

== Wards and localities ==
Sheffield is divided into 28 electoral wards for the purposes of City Council elections. The number of electors per ward was set at about 13,500 ± 10% in 2004, following a Local Government ward boundary review.

- Beauchief and Greenhill
  - Abbeydale, Beauchief, Batemoor, Chancet Wood, Greenhill, Jordanthorpe, Lowedges and Meadowhead
- Beighton
  - Beighton, Hackenthorpe (east), Owlthorpe and Sothall
- Birley
  - Frecheville, Hackenthorpe (west) and Gleadless (east)
- Broomhill & Sharrow Vale
  - Broomhall, Broomhill, Crookes(moor), Endcliffe
- Burngreave
  - Burngreave, Fir Vale, Grimesthorpe, Pitsmoor, Shirecliffe and Woodside
- City
  - City Centre and Highfield (east)
- Crookes & Crosspool
  - Crookes and Crosspool
- Darnall
  - Attercliffe, Carbrook, Darnall, Tinsley and part of Handsworth
- Dore and Totley
  - Bradway, Dore, Ringinglow, Totley and Whirlow
- East Ecclesfield
  - Chapeltown, Ecclesfield and Parson Cross (east)
- Ecclesall
  - Bents Green, Carterknowle, Ecclesall, Greystones and Millhouses
- Firth Park
  - Firth Park and Longley
- Fulwood
  - Fulwood, Lodge Moor and Ranmoor
- Gleadless Valley
  - Gleadless Valley, Herdings, Hemsworth, Rollestone, Newfield Green, Heeley and Meersbrook
- Graves Park
  - Norton, Norton Lees, Norton Woodseats and Woodseats
- Hillsborough
  - Hillsborough, Malin Bridge, Owlerton, Wadsley and Wisewood
- Manor Castle
  - Manor, Park Hill and Wybourn
- Mosborough
  - Halfway, Mosborough, Plumbley, Waterthorpe and Westfield
- Nether Edge & Sharrow
  - Highfield (west), Lowfield, Nether Edge and part of Sharrow
- Park & Arbourthorne
  - Arbourthorne, Gleadless, Newfield Green, Norfolk Park and Ridgeway
- Richmond
  - Intake, Normanton Spring, Richmond and Woodthorpe
- Shiregreen and Brightside
  - Brightside, Shiregreen and Wincobank
- Southey
  - Birley Carr, Foxhill, Parson Cross (west), Southey and Wadsley Bridge
- Stannington
  - High Bradfield, Low Bradfield, Dungworth, Loxley, Middlewood, Stannington, Strines, Woodland View and Worrall
- Stocksbridge and Upper Don
  - Bolsterstone, Deepcar, Ewden, Midhopestones, Oughtibridge, Stocksbridge and Wharncliffe Side
- Walkley
  - Neepsend, Netherthorpe, Upperthorpe and Walkley
- West Ecclesfield
  - Burncross, Grenoside and High Green
- Woodhouse
  - Handsworth, Orgreave and Woodhouse

== Civil parishes ==
- Bradfield
- Ecclesfield
- Stocksbridge

== Other areas ==
- Lower Don Valley, the historic East End of Sheffield

== Parliamentary constituencies ==
Sheffield is covered by six parliamentary constituencies, each formed from a number of wards.

- Sheffield Brightside and Hillsborough
- Sheffield Central
- Sheffield Hallam
- Sheffield Heeley
- Sheffield South East
- Penistone and Stocksbridge, which also includes parts of the Metropolitan Borough of Barnsley.

=== Former ===
The Sheffield constituency was broken into five divisions in 1885: Attercliffe; Brightside; Central; Ecclesall; and Hallam, with the addition of Hillsborough and Park constituencies in 1918 after the City extended its boundaries. The Central and Ecclesall constituencies were abolished in 1950 in favour of two new constituencies, Heeley and Neepsend, but the latter was abolished in 1955 and the former was replaced by a revived Central constituency in 1983.
