= Herdings Twin Towers =

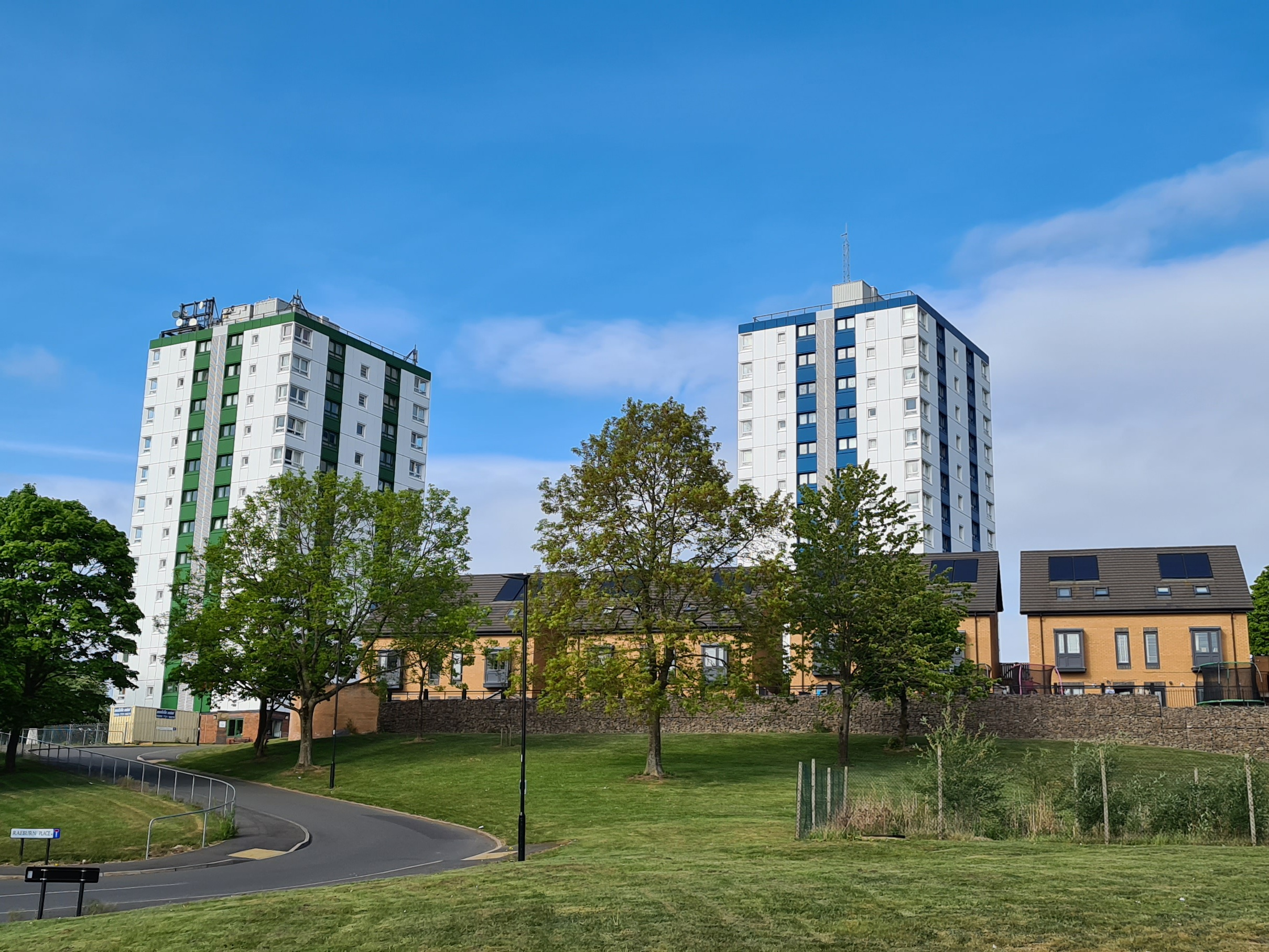
- The twin towers in May 2020. Mid-2010s low-rise housing on the right is where the third tower once stood.
- Interactive map of the Herdings Twin Towers area

General information
- Status: Completed
- Type: Residential
- Location: Raeburn Place; Herdings Park; Sheffield; South Yorkshire; S14 1SG
- Coordinates: 53.3435°N 1.4390°W
- Construction started: 1958
- Completed: 1959
- Renovated: 1998
- Demolished: 13 October 1996 (third tower only)
- Owner: Sheffield City Council
- Operator: Places for People

Height
- Antenna spire: 55 m (180 ft) (Queen Anne Court only)
- Roof: 38 m (125 ft) (both towers)

Technical details
- Floor count: 13 (per tower)
- Lifts/elevators: 1 (per tower)

Design and construction
- Main contractor: Tersons Ltd.

Other information
- Public transit access: P Herdings Park

The Herdings Twin Towers (officially known as Queen Anne Court and Queen Elizabeth Court) are twin towers located on Raeburn Place in the Herdings residential suburb of southern Sheffield, England. Although not the tallest buildings in Sheffield, their location atop a hill makes their rooftops the highest manmade location in the city. By virtue of its rooftop radio antenna, Queen Anne Court is the tenth-tallest building in Sheffield; it was the second-tallest upon completion in 1959, behind only Sheffield Town Hall.

The towers were built in 1959; at the time of construction, there were three towers at this location, receiving the nickname of the Three Sisters. The three towers were officially named Leighton, Morland and Raeburn. However, Raeburn was demolished in the year 1996 after being declared unsafe due to its construction atop an undiscovered fault, leading to the current Twin Towers nickname. After sitting empty for many years, the area of Raeburn Place around the location of the former third tower was redeveloped into semi-detached housing in 2013–2015.

The towers' location atop a hill has resulted in them being visible from across the city and beyond for many miles around, becoming iconic for the area. The northern tower was renamed from Leighton to Queen Elizabeth Court upon refurbishment, and is situated on the left of the image in this article; while the southern tower was renamed from Morland to Queen Anne Court. The towers are both 38 metres tall to the rooftop, although Queen Anne Court has a radio mast on the roof which raises its total height to around 55 metres. Both towers are constructed from brick and concrete originally in the brutalist style typical of tower blocks in Sheffield of this period. However, both towers were refurbished in 1998 to receive their current white cladding, with a green stripe on Queen Elizabeth Court and a blue stripe on Queen Anne Court.

The towers can be accessed from the Purple Route of the South Yorkshire Supertram network at nearby Herdings Park tram stop, the southern terminus of this line towards Cathedral in the city centre. Additionally, Herdings Park bus terminus on Raeburn Road, a short distance from the towers, is served by First South Yorkshire bus route 1A towards Chapeltown on the opposite side of the city, as well as school services 718 to Newfield Secondary School and PS1 to Dronfield Henry Fanshawe School.

== See also ==
- Brutalism in Sheffield
- Park Hill, Sheffield
- Regent Court
- List of tallest buildings in Sheffield
