= Beighton (ward) =

Electoral ward in the City of Sheffield, South Yorkshire, England

Coordinates: 53°21′N 01°13′W

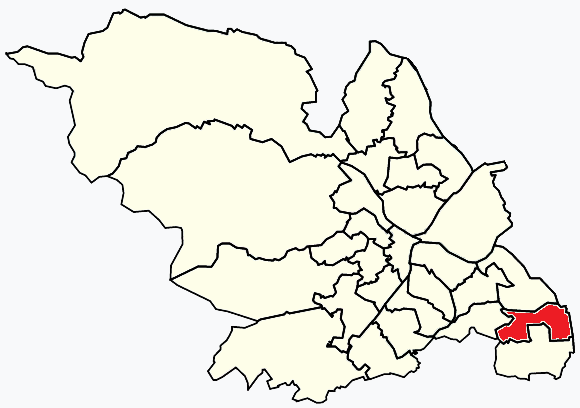
- Shown within Sheffield
- Population: 17,939 2011 census
- Metropolitan borough: City of Sheffield
- Metropolitan county: South Yorkshire
- Region: Yorkshire and the Humber
- Country: England
- Sovereign state: United Kingdom
- UK Parliament: Sheffield South East
- Councillors: Helen Mirfin-Boukouris (Labour Party); Christopher Rosling-Josephs (Labour Party); Ian Saunders (Labour Party)

Beighton (/ˈbeɪtən, ˈbaɪ-/)—which includes the districts of Beighton, Hackenthorpe, Owlthorpe, and Sothall—is one of the 28 electoral wards in City of Sheffield, England. It is located in the eastern part of the city, on the border with Rotherham and covers an area of 5.7 km^{2}. The population of this ward in 2011 was 17,939 people in 7,538 households.

Before 1967, the districts of this ward formed part of Derbyshire. In that year an extension of the then County Borough of Sheffield took in the area, which was consequently transferred to the West Riding of Yorkshire. In 1974 the area became part of the City of Sheffield, in the metropolitan and ceremonial county of South Yorkshire.

== Districts of Beighton ward ==
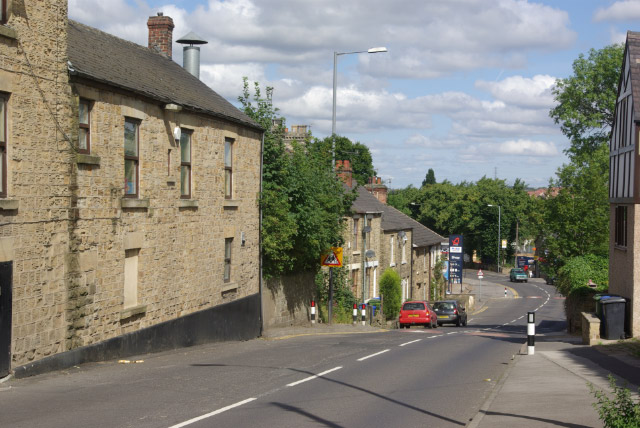
Looking down High Street of Beighton as it falls quite steeply from the area around the church into the bottom of the Rother Valley.

=== Beighton ===
Beighton (grid reference SK440835) is now a suburb of Sheffield after much expansion from a village in the last 100 years. The village was mentioned three times in the Domesday Book of 1086 as Bectun—the name meaning a farmstead beside a stream (or beck). Some remnants of the old village have survived including the church of Saint Mary the Virgin, which was built in the 12th century. The population in 1931 was 5,553.

Being primarily a coal mining area, many of the houses erected in the first part of the 20th century were by the National Coal Board. Later expansion in the last 30 years has been in private housing.

The Rother Valley Country Park is just outside the eastern edge of the village and is a local centre for water sports. A number of artificial lakes have been created for this purpose.

Beighton railway station was on the Great Central Main Line.

The parish church St. Mary the Virgin was restored in 1868 and a clock was erected in the tower in 1921 as a memorial to parishioners who gave their lives in the Great War.

Beighton Miners Welfare F.C. and Beighton Recreation F.C. both represented the area in the FA Cup

=== Sothall ===
grid reference SK440825 Sothall also includes the Meadowgate estate. It should not be confused with Southall.

Brook House Junior School is the main junior school in Sothall, with 304 pupils. It serves from Year 3 to Year 6 (7-11 year olds). Beighton Nursery Infant School is the main nursery and the main infant school in the area. The nursery section serves 0-4 year olds and the infant school serves Reception to Year 2 (4-7 year olds).

=== Owlthorpe ===
grid reference SK418825

Owlthorpe is a mainly residential area with the areas of Hackenthorpe, Birley and Waterthorpe. The South Yorkshire Supertram circulates around the estate and can be easily accessed depending on your location at three tram stops: Birley Moor Road, Donetsk Way or Hackenthorpe. It was mostly rural until the late 1980s when major development was planned and followed through for the area.

=== Hackenthorpe ===
grid reference SK408838
Hackenthorpe is a village 5 miles south east of Sheffield's city centre, now classed as a historic township of the city. Due to much expansion, the village became a part of Sheffield city during the 1950s. During much of the late 19th and 20th centuries the village was noted for its steelmaking, with the Thomas Staniforth & Co sickle works being based at Main Street. Another prominent feature of the village is the 17th century Hackenthorpe Hall, built by John Newbould for the Hounsfield family, with James Hounsfield being a prominent land owner. The building is today used as a nursery. Hackenthope was once a part of Derbyshire in the parish of Beighton but is now part of South Yorkshire.
