= Sheaf Valley Quarter =

Coordinates: 53.380°N 1.466°W

Sheaf Valley Quarter is an area in the centre of Sheffield, England. It is one of Sheffield's 11 designated City Centre Quarters, situated around the rail station and River Sheaf. Its borders are Commercial Street and a bowstring bridge to the north, the railway line to the east, Granville Road to the south (excluding Granville Square, Suffolk Road, Sheaf Square and Howard Street to the south-west and Arundel Gate to the west. It is named after the River Sheaf, which flows from the south of the city, underneath the current station and into the River Don and Castlegate. It is one of only 2 quarters (the other being Kelham) with some land outside the ring road.

== Current developments ==
Midland Mainline has just completed a £50 million re-fit of the station, which included a new multi-storey car park, new pedestrian footbridge, additional retail outlets, a larger concourse, new departure boards and the removal of a roundabout to create a large public square with a sculpture – the cutting edge and water feature. Improvement have been made to the pedestrian environment on Howard Street, with another new water feature and the creation of a tree-lined boulevard. A £110 million e-campus development aims to provide 600,000 sq ft (56,000 m^{2}) of office space for companies in the creative and digital industries. The Sheaf Valley Development framework provides a £1.5 billion, 20-year plan to develop the area around the railway station.
