= Ochre Dyke =

River in Sheffield, England

Coordinates: 53°21′09″N 1°19′57″W

The Ochre Dyke is a small stream in the south eastern part of the City of Sheffield in South Yorkshire, England. It rises some 100m to the east/south east of the ruined barn known as Eckington Lees. This is at the extreme western end of Birley Wood Golf Course. Ochre Dyke flows east/south east along the southern border of the golf course and passes through Birley Wood; up to this point it is the county boundary between South Yorkshire and North East Derbyshire. During summer months the brook frequently dries up to this point. The Ochre dyke gets its name from the pollution of the water by yellow ochre (Iron Oxide) as a result of coal mining activity in the upper reaches of the valley. The area in and around Birley wood was extensively mined for coal and black-band iron ore from at least the medieval period up to the mid 20th century when Dent Main Colliery closed. Other mines along the course of the stream were Moorhole Colliery East, Moorhole Colliery North and Moorhole Colliery South.

After passing Birley Moor Road, the brook flows through Owlthorpe, past the Crystal Peaks shopping centre, before heading into Beighton and passing beneath Sothall Green at its junction with the main road. The stream eventually flows into the River Rother.

The Ochre Dyke has never been used for powering Sickle grinding wheels, unlike the nearby Shire Brook which has hosted several wheels including the Nether Wheel, Carr Forge, Rainbow Forge and Cliff Wheel. The Cliff Wheel was located along the stream and was used for grinding.
