= Sheffield Inner Ring Road =

Road in Sheffield, England

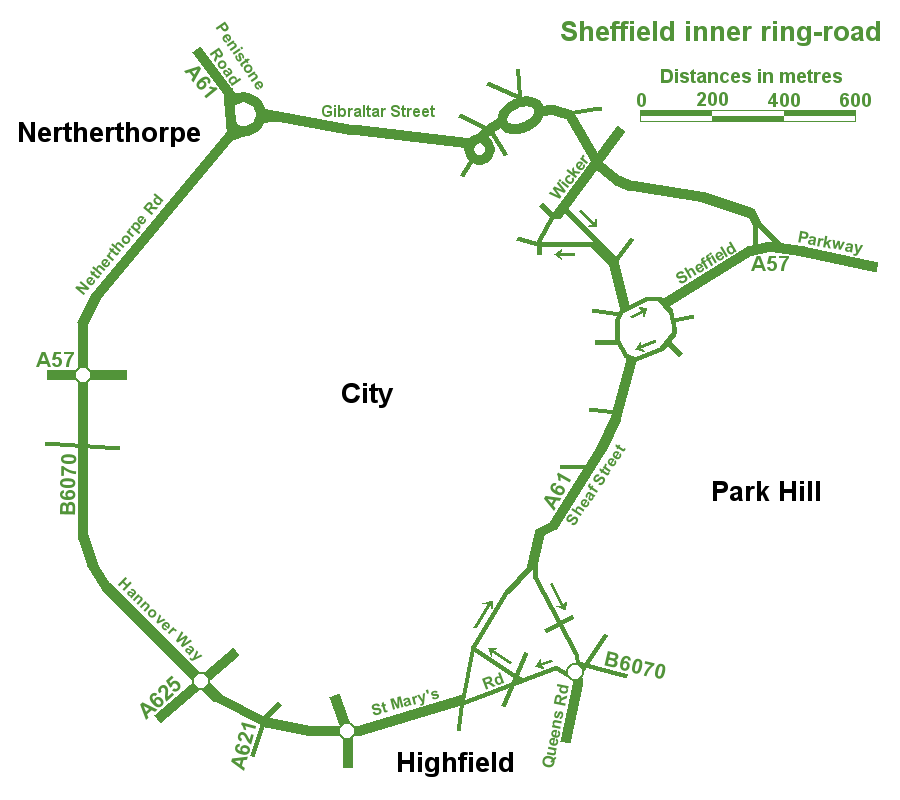
Route of the ring road

Sheffield Inner Ring Road is a dual-carriageway circling central Sheffield, South Yorkshire, England. Marked up as the A61 all the way around, it was built from the 1960s onwards. The Ring Road connects to the Sheffield Parkway, which itself connects with the M1 motorway. Many of Sheffield's current and under construction major office premises and luxury apartments are located on the Ring Road.

== Route ==
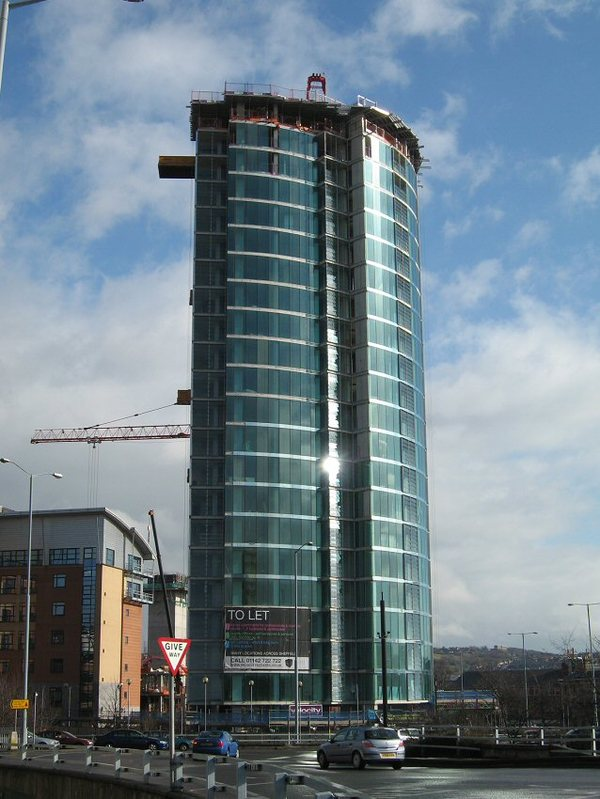
The 22-floor Velocity Tower on Moore Street roundabout.

It is formed mostly from the north–south A61, coming in from Chesterfield as the Unstone-Dronfield Bypass, Chesterfield Road South, Meadowhead, Chesterfield Road, London Road and Queens Road, joining the ring road itself at Suffolk Road. The A57 (as Sheffield Parkway) approaches Sheffield from the east (M1 jct 33) and arrives at Park Square Roundabout, the start of the ring road. Travelling clockwise, the ring road consists of Sheaf Street, Sheaf Square, Suffolk Road (anticlockwise) and Shoreham Street (clockwise), St Mary's Road, St Mary's Gate, Hannover Way, Upper Hannover Street, Netherthorpe Road and Hoyle Street, terminating at Shalesmoor, where the A61 turns north-west the Sheffield's northern suburbs and onto Barnsley. The South portion of the inner ring road follows most of the course of the B6070 before the dual-carriageway sections were built. The B6070 now only applies to Granville Road and Rutland Road at either ends of the southern portion of the ring road.

== Northern Relief Road ==
The Sheffield Northern Relief Road is the scheme closing a hole in the Inner Ring Road. Work began in 1999, with phase 1 finished in 2000 as Cutlers Gate and was subsequently renamed late in 2008 as Derek Dooley Way, in honour of the late Sheffielder who played football for Sheffield Wednesday before breaking his leg and going on to perform a number of backroom roles across the city at Sheffield United. Derek Dooley Way named section runs from the Parkway to the Wicker. In 2005 work started on the remainder, closing the gap from there to Shalesmoor and ended at the end of 2007. This section goes from Shalesmoor, down Moorfields, turning north at the junction with Gibraltar Street via a newly built road, meeting Corporation Street. It then crosses a new bridge before making its way to the Wicker through what was disused factories. There, at Junction 9, Bridgehouses, the road diverges, with part linking up to the Cutlers Gate section as described to join the Parkway where motorists may then turn right to continue on the ring road to Park Square and part heads underneath the viaduct and links to Spital Hill, Savile Street and Burngreave Road for connections to Attercliffe, Carbrook and the northeast of Sheffield at Meadowhall Centre/Tinsley. Nursery Street, the Wicker and Exchange Place were downgraded as part of the project.

== Junctions ==
Sheffield Inner Ring Road
left and right assume clockwise direction of travel roads which only allow access to, and not exit from the IRR have not been included, for example Milton Street (53.374861°N 1.479936°W
Left exits	Junction	Right exits
Parkway (for Darnall, Handsworth and Woodhouse suburbs, Sheffield City Airport, Sheffield Business Park, Advanced Manufacturing Park Outer Ring Road and M1)	1 (Cutlers Gate)	No exit
Broad Street (for Cricket Inn Road, Wybourn Estate); Duke Street (for Manor Top and Manor Estate)	2 (Park Square)	Commercial Street (for City Centre, Ponds Forge and Bus Station); Broad Street (for The Square); Exchange Place (for Castlegate Quarter, Furnival Road, Victoria Holiday Inn and The Wicker south end)
Sheffield Midland Station and Sheaf Valley Quarter	–
Shrewsbury Road (for Manor Top); Granville Road (for The Sheffield College); Queens Road for routes south to Chesterfield; Shoreham Street (for Bramall Lane football ground and routes south to Chesterfield)	3 (Granville Square)	Shoreham Street (for BBC Yorkshire's Radio Sheffield HQ the Leadmill and CIQ)
Mary Street^{ac} (for CIQ)	–	no exit
Eyre Street (for CIQ, the Moor parking, Heart of the City Parking, The Moor Quarter, and Town Hall)	4 (Bramall Lane)	Bramall Lane (for Bramall Lane Football ground, Heeley Mosque, Gleadless Valley and routes south to Chesterfield)
London Road^{c} (for London Road Shops and restaurants and unofficial Chinatown, Abbeydale Road restaurants and Meersbrook Park)	–	South Lane (for the Moor and DWP, DfES and Home Office in the Moorfoot Building)
Ecclesall Road (for shopping, boutiques, restaurants and Hunter's Bar, plus routes to the south-western suburbs of Dore, Totley and Ecclesall and the Peak District)	5 (Moore Street)	Moore Street (for The Moor Quarter, Devonshire Quarter, Heart of the City, BT tower, Grosvenor Hotel, pubs and bars)
Broomhall Street^{c} (for Broomhall and the Groves suburbs)	–	no exit
Broomspring Lane^{c} (for Broomhall)	–	Gell Street^{ac} (for West End parking, Devonshire Quarter
no exit	–	Leavygreave Road (for University St. George's Campus)
Western Bank (for University West Campus, Children's Hospital+A&E, Central Sheffield University Hospitals, Weston Park and its Museum); Bolsover Street (for Crookesmoor and Walkley suburbs) and Crookes Valley Park	6 (University Square)	Broad Lane (for St. George's Quarter, University St. George's Campus and Cathedral Quarter)
Morpeth Street	–	no exit
Meadow Street (for Upperthorpe and Infirmary Road shops)	–	Meadow Street (for St. Vincent's Quarter)
no exit	–	Doncaster Street (for St. Vincent's Quarter)
Penistone Road (for Hillsborough, Grenoside, Ecclesfield and Chapeltown suburbs, Hillsborough shops, Hillsborough – Sheffield Wednesday FC and Owlerton stadia, Northern General Hospital and routes north to Barnsley)	7 (Shalesmoor)	no exit
Ebenezer Street^{ac} (for Neepsend and Kelham Island)	–	Shepherd Street^{c} (for Kelham Island and St. Vincent's Quarter residential areas)
Russell Street^{ac}	–	Gibraltar Street^{c}
Cotton Mill Row (for Alma Street, Fat Cat Pub and Kelham Island Industrial Museum)	8 (Corporation Street)	Plum Lane (for Riverside Quarter, River Don and Castlemore); Corporation Street (for West Bar, Law Courts and Paradise Square)
Alma Street (for Fat Cat Pub and Kelham Island Goit); Mowbray Street (for Neepsend); Chatham Street (for Residential areas Neepsend and Burngreave)	9 (Bridgehouses)	Bridge Street (for Castlegate); Nursery Street (for Spitalfield and riverside)
Spital Hill (for Burngreave); Saville Street (for Lower Don Valley inc Valley Centertainment, Sheffield Arena)	10 (Spital Hill)	no exit
^{c} – clockwise travel only. ^{ac} – anticlockwise travel only

For an explanation of the Quarters, see Sheffield City Centre's Quarters

== In popular culture ==
American musician Rodney Crowell refers to the Ring Road in the song Glasgow Girl on his 2005 album The Outsider. In it the singer states "I'm stuck out on the Ring Road...if I don't find my way around soon I'm sure to end up lost. Sheffield has that certain mix of danger and despair; I need to roll these windows down and breathe the cool night air."
