= List of council high-rise apartment buildings in the City of Leeds =

This article lists existing and demolished council commissioned high-rise apartment buildings in the City of Leeds. High-rise being defined as being eight stories or more.

== Armley ==
Current status	Name	Location	Completed	Image	Notes
Existent	Burnsall Court	Theaker Lane, Armley	1963		
Existent	Burnsall Croft	Theaker Lane, Armley	1965		
Existent	Burnsall Gardens	Theaker Lane, Armley	1963		
Existent	Burnsall Grange	Theaker Lane	1966		
Existent	The Heights East	Tong Road, Armley			
Existent	The Heights West	Tong Road, Armley			
Existent	Westerly Croft	Mistress Lane, Armley	1963		
Existent	Westerly Rise	Mistress Lane, Armley	1963		

== Beckett Park ==
Current status	Name	Location	Completed	Image	Notes
Existent	Queenswood Court	Queenswood Drive, Beckett Park	1963		
Existent	Queenswood Heights	Queenswood Drive, Beckett Park	1965		

== Beeston ==
Current status	Name	Location	Completed	Image	Notes
Existent	Crescent Grange	Dewsbury Road, Beeston			
Existent	Crescent Towers	Dewsbury Road, Beeston			

== Bramley ==
Current status	Name	Location	Completed	Image	Notes
Existent	Gamble Hill Croft	Gamble Hill Estate, Bramley	1968		
Existent	Gamble Hill Grange	Gamble Hill Estate, Bramley	1969		
Existent	Poplar Court 1	Poplar Mount, Bramley	1964		
Existent	Poplar Court 2	Poplar Mount, Bramley	1964		
Existent	Poplar Mount 1	Poplar Mount, Bramley	1963		
Existent	Poplar Mount 2	Poplar Mount, Bramley	1963		
Existent	Rycroft Court Court	Rycroft Avenue, Bramley			
Existent	Rycroft Green	Rycroft Avenue, Bramley			
Existent	Rycroft Place	Rycroft Avenue, Bramley			
Existent	Rycroft Towers	Swinnow Lane, Bramley			

== Burley ==
Current status	Name	Location	Completed	Image	Notes
Existent	Marlborough Towers	Duncombe Street, Leeds	1966		

== Burmantofts ==
Current status	Name	Location	Completed	Image	Notes
Existent	Brignall Croft	Gargrave Approach, Burmantofts	1966		
Existent	Cromwell Heights	Cromwell Street, Burmantofts			
Existent	Ebor Gardens Flats (4 blocks)	Ebor Gardens Estate			
Existent	Naseby Grange	Cromwell Street, Burmantofts			
Existent	Gargrave Court	Gargrave Approach, Burmantofts	1966		
Demolished	Oxton Close	Oxton Way, Burmantofts			10 storey T block with deck access. Part of a five block development of which only Torre Gardens and Torre Green exist. Demolished between 1987 and 2002.
Demolished	Oxton Gardens	Oxton Way, Burmantofts			10 storey T block with deck access. Part of a five block development of which only Torre Gardens and Torre Green exist. Demolished between 1987 and 2002.
Demolished	Oxton Place	Oxton Way, Burmantofts			10 storey T block with deck access. Part of a five block development of which only Torre Gardens and Torre Green exist. Demolished between 1987 and 2002.
Existent	Scargill Grange	Gargrave Approach, Burmantofts	1966		
Existent	Torre Gardens	Torre Road			One of two remaining blocks of what was originally a five block development.
Existent	Torre Green	Torre Road			One of two remaining blocks of what was originally a five block development.

== Chapel Allerton ==
Current status	Name	Location	Completed	Image	Notes
Existent	Potternewton Heights	Potternewton Lane, Chapel Allerton	1965		Built by George Wimpey

== Cottingley ==
Current status	Name	Location	Completed	Image	Notes
Existent	Cottingley Heights	Cottingley	1972		
Existent	Cottingley Towers	Cottingley	1972		

== Farnley ==
Current status	Name	Location	Completed	Image	Notes
Existent	Whincover Grange	Whincover Drive, Farnley			

== Farsley ==
Current status	Name	Location	Completed	Image	Notes
Existent	Marsden Court	Farsley			

== Gipton ==
Current status	Name	Location	Completed	Image	Notes
Existent	Brecon Court	Brecon Approach, Gipton			
Existent	Briarsdale Court	Oak Tree Drive, Gipton			
Existent	Briarsdale Croft, Gipton	Oak Tree Drive, Gipton			
Existent	Gipton Gate East	Gipton			
Existent	Gipton Gate West	Gipton			

== Gledhow ==
Current status	Name	Location	Completed	Image	Notes
Existent	Gledhow Towers	Brackenwood Drive, Gledhow			
Existent	Lidgett Towers	Gledhow			

== Halton Moor ==
Current status	Name	Location	Completed	Image	Notes
Existent	Lakeland Court	Cartmel Drive, Halton Moor			Originally three blocks plus low rise four-storye blocks of maisonettes. These were demolished in the 1990s and Lakeland Court was reclad and the decks glazed in

== Harehills ==
Current status	Name	Location	Completed	Image	Notes
Existent	Shakespeare Court	Beckett Street, Harehills	1969		
Existent	Shakespeare Grange	Beckett Street, Harehills	1969		
Existent	Shakespeare Towers	Beckett Street, Harehills	1969		

== Holbeck ==
Current status	Name	Location	Completed	Image	Notes
Demolished (2010)	Gaitskell Flats (5 blocks)	Holbeck Moor Road			
Existent	Meynell Heights	Meynell Approach, Holbeck	1966		

== Ireland Wood ==
Current status	Name	Location	Completed	Image	Notes
Existent	Beevers Court	Iveson Approach, Ireland Wood			

== Killingbeck ==
Current status	Name	Location	Completed	Image	Notes
Demolished	Highways flats (2 blocks)	York Road, Killingbeck			Demolition proposed in 2021 Manually demolished 2024

== Kirkstall ==
Current status	Name	Location	Completed	Image	Notes
Existent	Grayston Crest	Eden Mount, Kirkstall			
Existent	Grayson Heights	Eden Mount, Kirkstall			

== Lincoln Green ==
Current status	Name	Location	Completed	Image	Notes
Existent	Lincoln Road Flats (8 blocks, 480 flats)	Lincoln Road, Lincoln Gren	1958		Constructed by Shepherd Building Group to design by architect RAH Livett. Refurbished 2014–15 with red metalwork repainted turquoise.
Existent	Roxby Close	Beckett Street, Burmantofts	1959		Constructed by George Wimpey to design by architect RAH Livett.

== Little London ==
Current status	Name	Location	Completed	Image	Notes
Existent	Carlton Croft	Little London			
Existent	Carlton Garth	Little London			
Demolished (2010)	Carlton Towers (flats 1-49)	Little London			
Demolished (2010)	Carlton Towers (flats 50–98)	Little London			
Existent	Lovell Park Grange	Lovell Park Road, Little London	1964		
Existent	Lovell Park Heights	Lovell Park Road, Little London	1964		
Existent	Lovell Park Towers	Lovell Park Road, Little London	1964		
Existent	Oatlands Court	Oatlands Court, Little London	1969		
Existent	Oatlands Heights	Oatlands Drive, Little London	1969		
Existent	Oatlands Towers	Oatlands Drive, Little London	1969		

== Moor Allerton ==
Current status	Name	Location	Completed	Image	Notes
Existent	Leafield Towers	King Lane, Moor Allerton			
Existent	Scotland Wood Flats (3 blocks)	Scotland Wood Road, Moor Allerton			

== Moor Grange ==
Current status	Name	Location	Completed	Image	Notes
Existent	Clayton Court	Fillingfir Drive, Moor Grange	1958		
Existent	Clayton Grange	Fillingfir Drive, Moor Grange	1958		This block of flats was used in the filming of The Beiderbecke Affair
Existent	Moor Grange Court	Butcher Hill, Moor Grange	1958		

== Saxton Gardens ==
Current status	Name	Location	Completed	Image	Notes
Existent	Saxton Gardens Flats (eight blocks)	Marsh Lane, Leeds			

== Seacroft ==
Current status	Name	Location	Completed	Image	Notes
Existent	Bailey Towers	Bailey's Lane, Seacroft			
Existent	Barncroft Court	Boggart Hill Drive, Seacroft	1962		
Existent	Barncroft Grange	Boggart Hill Drive, Seacroft	1962		
Existent	Barncroft Heights	Boggart Hill Drive, Seacroft	1962		
Existent	Barncroft Towers	Boggart Hill Drive, Seacroft	1963		
Existent	Brooklands Towers	Bailey's Lane, Seacroft			
Existent	Parkway Court	Foundry Lane, Seacroft			
Existent	Parkway Grange	Foundry Lane, Seacroft			
Existent	Queensview	Brooklands Avenue, Seacroft			
Existent	Ramshead Heights	North Parkway, Seacroft			
Existent	Seacroft Gate 1	North Parkway, Seacroft			
Existent	Seacroft Gate 2	York Roaf, Seacroft			

== Swarcliffe ==
Current status	Name	Location	Completed	Image	Notes
Demolished	Ash Tree Court	Swarcliffe			Manually demolished 2005
Demolished	Ash Tree Grange	Swarcliffe			Manually demolished 2003
Demolished	Brayton Grange	Swarcliffe	1966		Demolished by explosives 2001
Demolished	Elmet Towers	Swarcliffe			Deck access 'T' block. All others in area were internal access 'H' blocks. Manually demolished 2008
Demolished	Farndale Court	Swarcliffe			Demolished by explosives 2001
Demolished	Langbar Grange	Swarcliffe	1966		Manually demolished 2006
Demolished	Langbar Towers	Swarcliffe			Manually demolished 2003
Demolished	Penwell Croft	Swarcliffe			Manually demolished 2005
Existent	Sherburn Court	Sherburn Approach, Swarcliffe			Last remaining high-rise in Swarcliffe

== West Park ==
Current status	Name	Location	Completed	Image	Notes
Existent	Norman Towers	Spen Lane, West Park	1958		

== Woodhouse ==
Current status	Name	Location	Completed	Image	Notes
Existent	Holborn Towers	Shay Street, Woodhouse	1965		

== Wortley ==
Current status	Name	Location	Completed	Image	Notes
Existent	Clyde Court	Wellington Road, Wortley	1968		
Existent	Clyde Grange	Wellington Road, Wortley	1968		
Existent	Wortley Towers	Tong Road, Wortley	1966		
Existent	Wortley Heights	Tong Road, Wortley			

== See also ==
- Architecture of Leeds
- Brutalism in Sheffield
- Glasgow tower blocks
- List of tallest buildings and structures in Leeds
