= Reema construction =

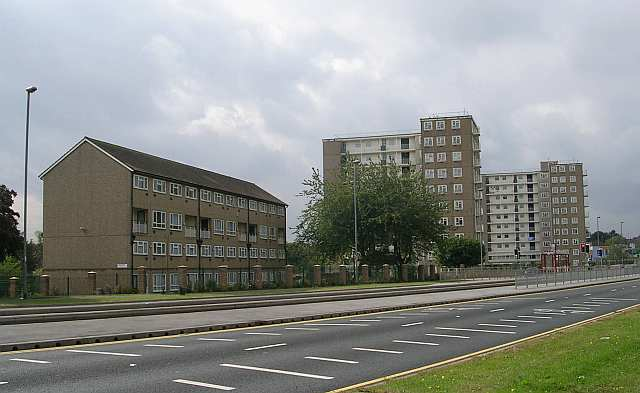
An array of Reema panel buildings in Killingbeck, Leeds.

Reema construction is a system of building using prefabricated reinforced concrete panels which came into being in the late 1940s and was still in use well into the 1960s.

Buildings made in this way are currently (2008) very hard to obtain finance on in the UK, primarily due to potential problems with similar large panel system construction buildings, such as Ronan Point. There are two different types of Reema Construction, Reema Hollow Panel, and Reema Conclad. Owners of Reema Conclad will have a slightly easier time obtaining a mortgage, but many major high street lenders will still not fund purchase of this type of building.

Reema was the trading name of Reed & Mallik, a company that traded in Salisbury between 1937 and 1968.

Its history is detailed in a monograph published by the SWIAS (South Wiltshire Industrial Archaeology Society): One Man and his Construction Company Reed and Mallik 1937 to 1968 by John Illston

Synopsis: William Edward Reed founded his company in 1937. It grew and prospered without moving from its modest base in Salisbury. Examples of their work include prefabricated concrete houses and high rise apartment blocks, village halls, dams in Wales and Scotland and Bridges in Australasia. Sources include company files and the house magazine, Strongwork News, as well as Bill's widow, Mrs Brenda Reed and a number of company employees.

Copies can be obtained from SWIAS.

Traditionally a hard to heat property, but with the installation of external wall insulation it will see them dramatically reduce their heat loss. Typically full grants are now available to have this work completed, this is especially so for households that use coal, oil, or electricity to heat their homes.
