= Castlegate Quarter =

Quarter of Sheffield city centre in England

Coordinates: 53.3837°N 1.4614°W

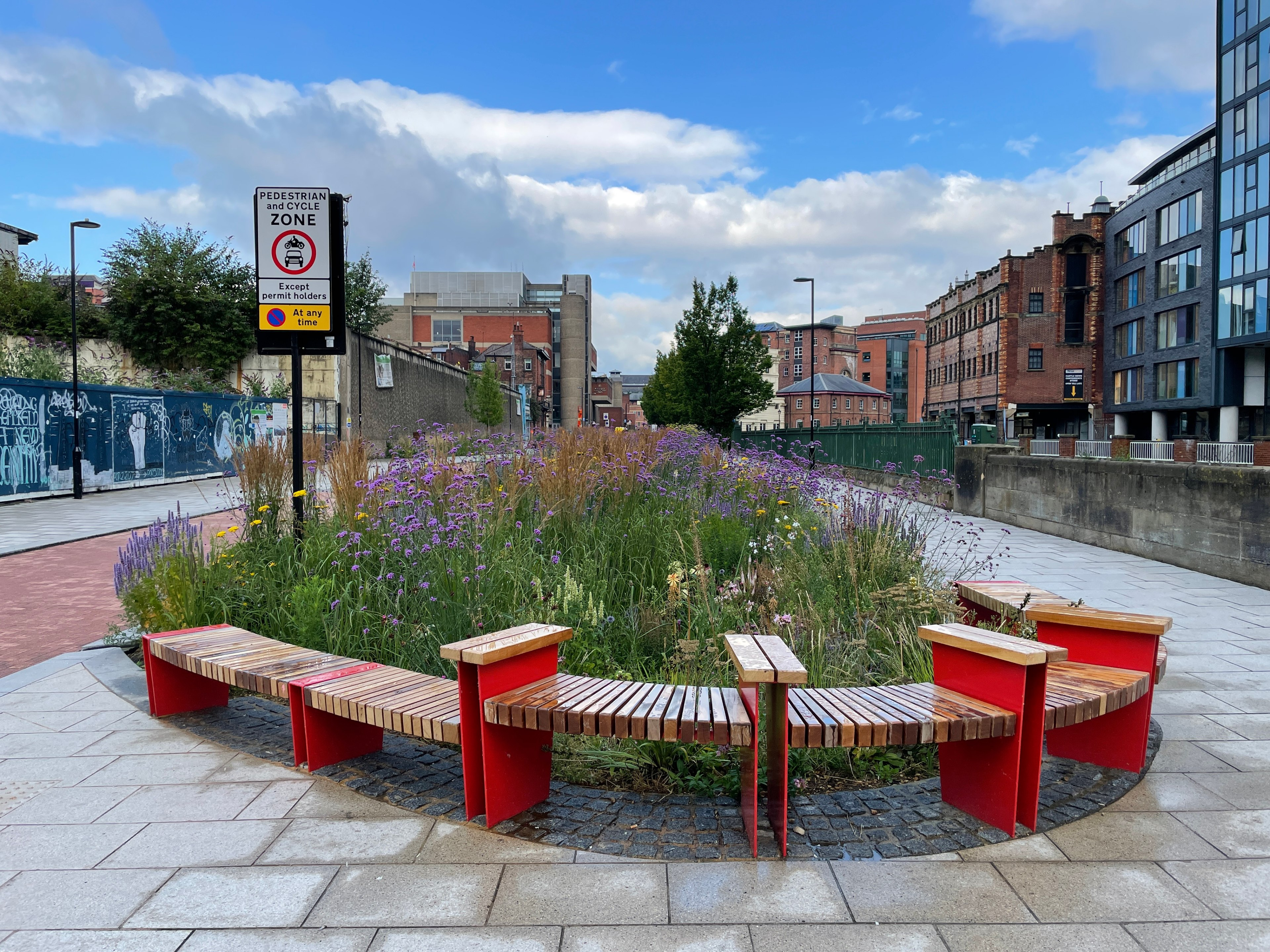
Castlegate

The Castlegate Quarter is one of the eleven quarters of Sheffield city centre. It is named after Castlegate, the quarter's main thoroughfare. The boundaries of the Castlegate Quarter are formed by Castlegate and the River Don to the north, Exchange Place to the east, Commercial Street and part of the High Street to the south, and Angel Street and Snig Hill to the west. For the latter part of the 20th century, the Castlegate Quarter was dominated by Castle Market, a large indoor market building. Following the demolition of Castle Market in 2015, the quarter is now undergoing regeneration as of 2020.

The quarter's eponymous road, Castlegate, was originally part of the main thoroughfare from the city centre to the north of the city, linking Park Square to The Wicker; however, the completion of the Sheffield Northern Relief Road dual-carriageway in 2007 redirected traffic away from the Castlegate area, and the road was downgraded. Castlegate was built along the southern bank of the River Don along the north side of what was once Sheffield Castle, and was originally the location of several slaughterhouses. It has also subsequently served as a back entrance to the Alexandra Opera House and then the Castle Market, which was constructed in the 1960s to provide permanent accommodation to tradesmen. Castle Market closed in November 2013 with the opening of the Moor Markets across the city centre, and demolition of Castle Market commenced in 2015.

The foundations of the old Sheffield Castle, from which the area takes its name, were rediscovered following the demolition of the market building. In August 2018, archaeologists began excavations of the castle foundations in order to return them to public view for the first time in hundreds of years. Sheffield City Council subsequently invested £5 million as part of Grey to Green Phase Two, a regeneration plan for the Castlegate Quarter following the closure of the market, which includes removing the River Sheaf from its culvert close to its confluence with the River Don and creating a new riverside park incorporating the castle ruins. As part of the scheme, Castlegate was pedestrianised and its bus stops were relocated onto surrounding roads. Construction to deculvert the Sheaf and create the new park began in February 2024 and is due to be completed in 2026.

In October 2021, Sheffield City Council was awarded 'levelling up' funding for the deculverting of the River Sheaf and the restoration of the former Castle site into a city centre park.

== Castlegate ==
Alongside the Castlegate Quarter is Castlegate the street.

This was subject to a scheme called 'Grey to Green' which restored the road from an urban dual carriageway to a linear urban park.
