= Park Square Bridge =

Bridge in Sheffield, England

Coordinates: 53.3829°N 1.4615°W

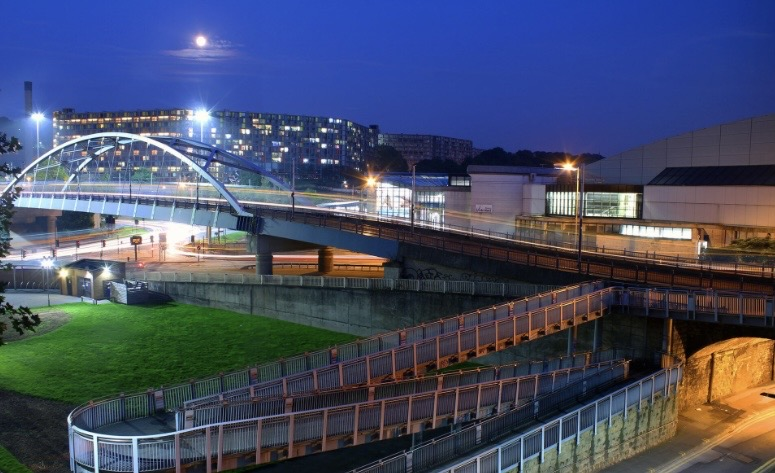
Park Square Bridge

Park Square Bridge, also known as the Supertram Bridge, is a prominent bridge in the city of Sheffield, England. It was constructed in 1993 using a bowstring, or tied arch design. The bridge carries the Sheffield Supertram system from Commercial Street onto the Park Square roundabout.
