= St George's Quarter =

Coordinates: 53.382°N 1.479°W

St. George's Quarter is one of the eleven "quarters" located in the centre of Sheffield, Yorkshire, devised in the 1994 City Centre Strategy. It is bounded by Upper Hanover Street to the west, West Street to the south, Rockingham Street to the east and Broad Lane to the north.

It developed around and is named after St. George's Church, which is now used as a lecture theatre by the University of Sheffield. Much of the quarter is given over to buildings and departments of the university, including a library, health centre, computer room, departments of engineering and materials science (with history, English and modern languages linguistics to follow in the new Jessop West Department Building, with music in the old Jessop Hospital).

== Significant buildings ==
1. St. George's Church Lecture Theatre
2. Sir Frederick Mappin Building
3. Steel City House
4. Somme Barracks and Drill Hall
5. Jessop Hospital
6. 23, 25, 27 Trippet Lane

== Character areas ==
1. St. George's Churchyard
2. West Street
