= Church of St Mary the Virgin, Beighton =

Church in South Yorkshire, England

Coordinates: 53.34552°N 1.337132°W

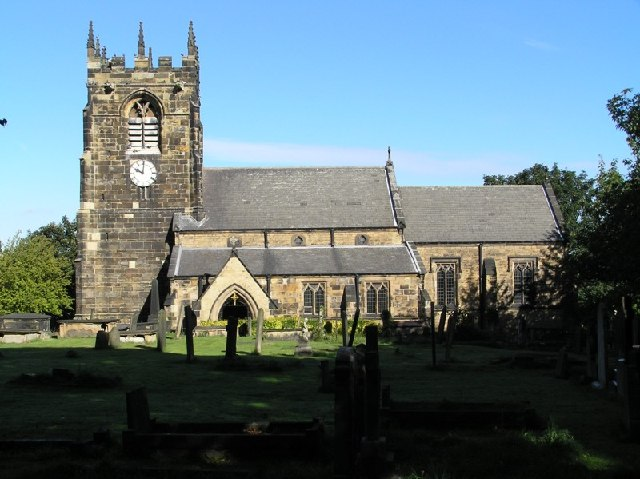

The Church of St Mary the Virgin is situated in Beighton, a suburb of the City of Sheffield, England. It is located just off High Street, it is the parish church for the parish of Beighton and a Grade II* listed building. Although the original church dated from the 12th century there is no remaining trace of this original structure, although there are some later Medieval parts (see below). It is dedicated to Mary, the mother of Jesus. The benefice is currently vacant (no minister). The Church now ( 2025 ) has a Minister shared with St James Woodhouse.

== History and architecture ==
Beighton was mentioned in the Domesday Book of 1086 but there was no reference to any church in the settlement. It is believed that St. Mary's dates from the year c. 1150, this is based on the discovery of a disintegrating late Norman semi-circular chancel arch which was unearthed during late 19th century repair work. The first documented mention of the church is in an undated deed written during the reign of Edward I (1272-1307). At that time the church was dedicated to Saint Radegund who originated in Thuringia, there is no date for the change of dedication to St Mary and as late as 1557 there was a mention of "the churche yard of V(ir)gyn Radegond at Beghton".

The tower arch is thought to be the oldest part of the present building and may date to the 13th century, while the north aisle dates from the 15th century, there was probably once a chantry chapel at its east end. There was a period of rebuilding and alteration towards the end of the 14th century that saw the addition of a pointed chancel arch and nave arcades. There was further restoration in 1773 but by the 1860s the church was in a dilapidated state and the newly appointed minister the Reverend George Antrobus employed the Chesterfield architect Samuel Rollinson (1827-1891) to oversee an extensive programme of reconstruction and renovation which took place between October 1867 and December 1868. The work included taking down the walls of the chancel and the south aisle and rebuilding them on the original footprint, the Clerestory windows to the nave were removed, and a gallery at the west end of the church was taken down. Bench pews replaced the box pews allowing for the capacity of the church to be increased to 291.

The north door or Devil's door, was blocked up at one time and then later re-opened. The devil's door was left ajar during baptisms to release any evil spirits in the child. On the north side of the chancel are two gravestones, one of these refers to the Jermyns, a wealthy family who owned property in Beighton, Hackenthorpe and Eckington. There is a Hagioscope or squint cut into the wall between the chancel and the nave, this enabled worshippers to see the priest's actions indirectly. Two brasses on the south wall of the nave mark the resting places of William Jessoppe, vicar of Beighton, who died in 1667 and M. Robert Jessoppe of Waterthorp Gent who died in 1753. The rood was designed by Ninian Comper.

In December 2006, Ed Dennison Archaeological Services Ltd were commissioned by the church council to conduct archaeological observations during internal refurbishment of the church and the replacement of the external drainage system. The result of this observation found no evidence of any remaining features connected with the original medieval church. The most noteworthy feature uncovered was the rediscovery of an early stone floor, last recorded in 1816 and buried in the 1867 restoration. The floor is thought to date from the early 16th century.

== List of rectors ==
- 1316 – Bartholomew de Coryngham
- 1349 – Geoffrey de Haddon
- 1356 – William de Fereby
- ? – Richard de Beuley
- 1367 – Richard de Raundes
- 1374 – Richard de Kyngeston
- 1396 – John del More
- 1429 – Roger Wyresdale
- 1435 – Thomas Wakesley
- 1442 – Matthew Lachford
- 1456 – William Orwell (Collated by Bishop)
- ? - John Tynker (Buried at Beighton 1480)
- 1490 - Thomas Atkinson
- 1535? – Leonard Lynley (d 1538 buried in chancel)
- 1538 – Thomas Rainshaw
- 1543 – Ralph Royez
- 1557 – William Wordsworth
- ? – Nicholas Harvey
- 1567 – George Harvey
- 1603 – John Higdon (d 1613, buried in chancel)
- 1638 – Edward Haslam
- 1640 – John Hunne
- 1650 – William Jessop (d 18 April 1667 d at Beighton) Appointed by Parliamentary Commission
- 1667 – Thomas Goold (Buried at Beighton 1674)
- 1674 – Henry Burdyn
- 1690 – Thomas Jackson
- 1703 – Marmaduke Drake (Buried at Beighton 2 December 1741)
- 1733 - John Drake
- 1745 – John Drake Jnr (Buried at Beighton 7 February 1763)
- 1763 – Thomas Purcell (Buried at Beighton 28 July 1764)
- 1764 – Joseph Meller
- 1769 – Richard Morton
- 1821 – Hon. Thomas Erskine (Buried Beighton 5 January 1859)
- 1859 – George Hardolph Eyre
- 1865 – George Antrobus (buried at Beight 21 November 1872)
- 1872 – Edward Reynolds
- 1889 – Robert Stewart Hare
- 1911 – Andrew Brown Maughan
- 1932 – Paul Basil Honeybourne Ashwin
- 1939 – Ernest, Reginald Redfern
- 1946 – Harold Pickles
- 1957 – William Gilbert Potts
- 1964 – Colin Nield
- 1969 – Robert Edwin Michael Vickers (d 1 December 1975, Ashes interred at Beighton)
- 1976 – Alan Roy Billings
- 1978 – Alan Gardner Livesley
- 1984 – Alan Grenville Richards

Chantry Priests

- Richard Ashe (died 1541) was buried in the church.
