= Places for People =

British property owner

- Industry: Real estate
- Founded: 1965; 61 years ago
- Headquarters: United Kingdom
- Key people: Greg Reed
- Revenue: 546,000 pound sterling (2017)
- Number of employees: 12,900 (2025)
- Subsidiaries: Places Leisure; PfP Students
- Website: www.placesforpeople.co.uk

Places for People (PfP) is a property management, development, regeneration and leisure company based in the United Kingdom. On 20 March 2024, it was announced that it had completed the merger of its operations with those of South Devon Rural (SDR).

== History ==
Places for People was founded in 1965 by the North British Housing Association. A year after Bristol Churches Housing Association joined the group, its name was changed to Places for People Group Ltd. on 1 June 2000.

With Places for People Scotland Care and Support and Procurement Hub, a public procurement consortium, as part of the firm, PfP raises money from investors by issuing corporate bonds in its own name. PfP was the first housing group to respond by providing mortgages for shared ownership on its own developments.

In April 2008, PfP launched the Ownhome equity loan scheme in partnership with the Co-operative Bank. This was aimed at enabling first-time buyers, key workers and occupants of social housing to purchase homes on the open market through a combination of a standard cooperative bank mortgage for between 60 and 80% of the value, with the balance funded via an equity loan from Places for People. The scheme ended in April 2010.

In 2010, the group recorded a £25 million impairment in the value of its assets, the largest write-down by a UK housing association up to that date. The following year, it raised the social housing sector's first unsecured UK bond.

=== Awards ===
In 2012 and 2014, PfP won Landlord of the Year at Property Week's RESI awards.
