= Park Square, Sheffield =

Road Interchange in Sheffield

Coordinates: 53.383°N 1.460°W

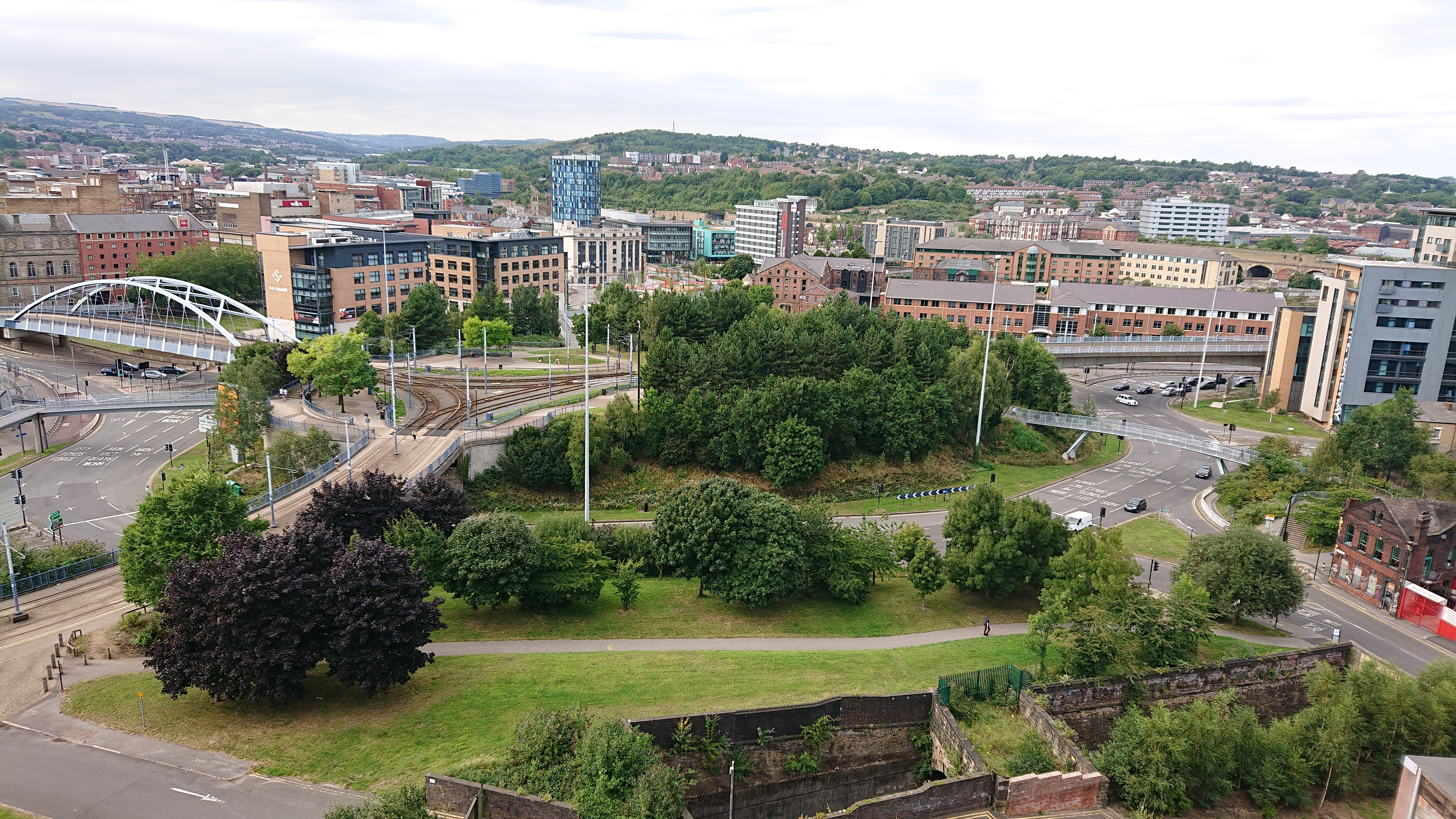
Park Square

Park Square is a major roundabout in Sheffield, England. The Sheffield Parkway, a major road from M1 Junction 33, terminates here. It is located next to Ponds Forge and Victoria Quays.

It is also a major tram junction connecting to the Park Square Bridge, and has many pedestrian bridges.

During February 2025, an event dubbed as the Park Square siege occurred, in which an armed 47-year-old man in a nearby apartment building was involved with a standoff with South Yorkshire Police.

== Roads running into Park Square ==
Clockwise from the North-East:

- Sheffield Parkway (A61/A57)
- Broad Street
- Duke Street (B6070)
- Sheaf Street (A61)
- Commercial Street
- Broad Street West
- Exchange Place
