= J. L. Womersley =

British architect and town planner

J. L. Womersley CBE FRIBA FRTPI
- Womersley in the 1950s
- Born: John Lewis Womersley; 12 December 1909; Sheffield, West Riding of Yorkshire
- Died: 28 October 1990 (aged 80); Sheffield, South Yorkshire
- Education: Huddersfield School of Architecture
- Occupation: Architect
- Practice: Sheffield City Council
- Projects: Gleadless Valley, Hyde Park, Park Hill

John Lewis Womersley CBE, FRIBA, FRTPI, Hon. LL.D. and MA (12 December 1909 – 28 October 1990) was a British architect and town planner known for his work as City Architect for Sheffield, leading the team that created the Gleadless Valley, Hyde Park and Park Hill estates, but also infamous for Manchester's vast Hulme Crescents, whose design faults led to them becoming unlettable and their demolition after only twenty years. Womersley's passion was "incorporating buildings, roads, paths, play-grounds, schools and superb landscaping as the complete architectural environment."

== Principles ==
Working under a Labour local government, Womersley believed strongly in creating a better, more egalitarian society through the re-building of post-war Britain. He believed that ordinary people deserve and benefit from thoughtful planning and good architecture, improving tenants’ living experience through the preservation of woodland and separating pedestrians from road traffic. In a letter to The Times (8 July 1965) Womersley laid out his ideas about the coexistence of man and machine:

Traffic should serve not master people. Urban motorway proposals should include careful analysis of the human unhappiness and environmental destruction that will result.

Womersley was dedicated to providing social housing that improved not only quality of living, but quality of life. His housing estates in Sheffield and Northampton were laid out in "crisp and modern style" with "detail and care often missing from later social housing." The scale of urban transformation that Womersley invested during his time in Sheffield remains unique in this country, his department committed to, "creating houses for working people as monuments for future generations rather than shamefaced hutches."

One of his constructions, Park Hill, at the time of its construction was considered "a brave, enlightened approach to housing – people coming across the world to see it. We are unlikely ever again to see architecture, let alone housing, delivered in such a confident and optimistic way." When it was built it was considered an "ambitious inner city development"

Delivering a paper to the Architectural Association in 1966, Womersley stated that architectural design and human experience are not mutually exclusive, "If we are to have satisfaction again we need to make original design once more the primary force in town and country planning, making an attempt to produce something significant for today when judged by those of tomorrow.".

Womersley's Local Authority office invested in building schools, churches and other public buildings that were valued locally, but it was their social housing that became of world importance. With his team, Womersley was able to pioneer new building technologies that fostered creativity that placed Sheffield in the forefront of social housing, culminating in the city hosting the RIBA annual conference in 1963.

== Training ==
Womersley was born before the First World War and, in his youth, would have been aware of the hardship endured by ordinary people during the Depression Years through unemployment, poor housing and bad living conditions in the tightly packed Industrial cities of the North. His father, a Huddersfield cloth designer, was unable to see the potential in his son and declined to fund his university education. At Huddersfield School of Architecture, Womersley received a rounded basic training in practical design, building construction and professional practice. He was mentored by Norman Culley, First Head of the school. Writing in his obituary, Womersley described Culley as a man who "had that vital spark that turns a teacher into a leader: boundless enthusiasm, perpetual youthfulness and the power to enthuse and inspire." Both men shared the belief that in order to produce buildings that are worthy of heritage, the architect must strive for ‘beauty through simplicity.’

Following his study of Architecture, Womersley completed a degree in Town Planning and developed a keen interest in the work of the Garden City Movement and sought to emulate for his generation the high qualities of housing layout and amenities achieved in Letchworth and Welwyn Garden City. He became a powerful supporter of the movement to create a better, more egalitarian society in the re-building of war-devastated Britain.

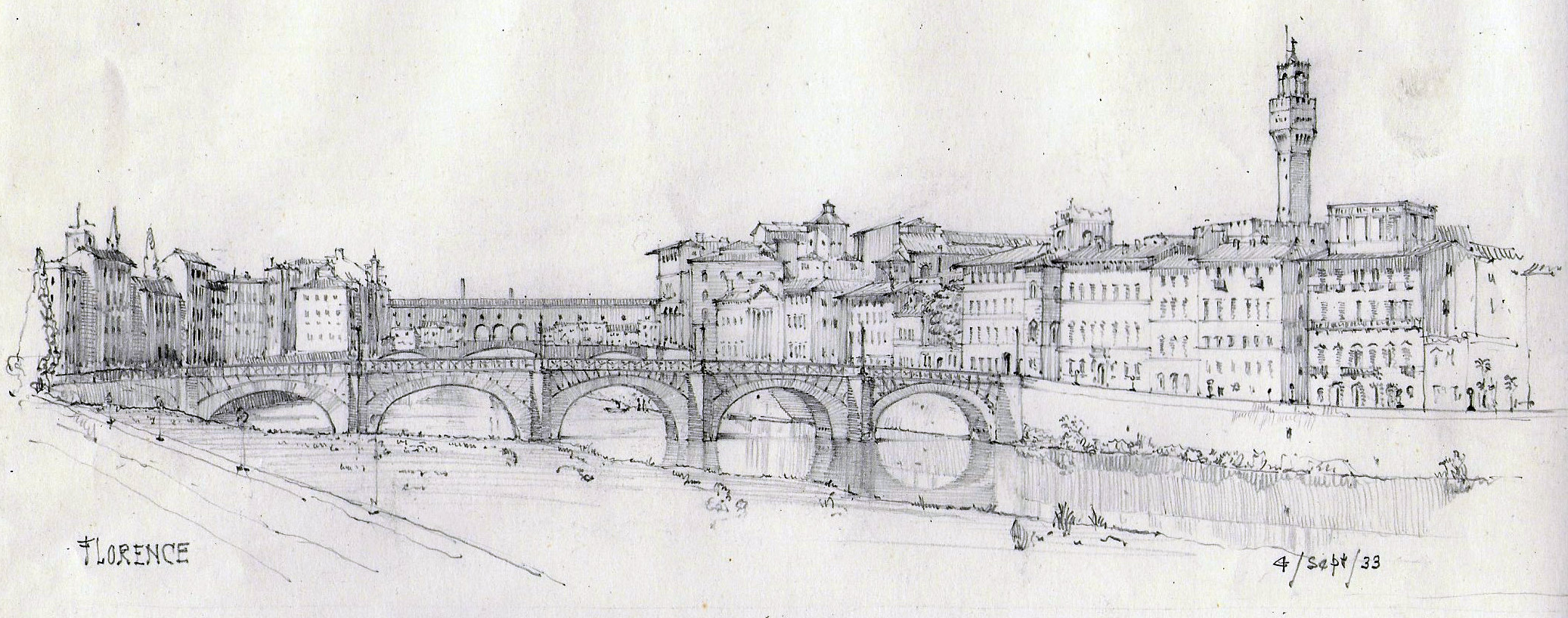
Florence, sketched during his travelling scholarship, 1933

== Early career ==
After qualifying, Womersley spent some time working in London, where he designed an underground restaurant in Golders Green, complete with sprung dance floor. He was awarded a Nicholson Travelling Scholarship by the West Yorkshire Society of Architects in 1933, which gave him the opportunity to travel to Europe, sketching buildings in Paris, Rome, Florence and Venice and hillside towns. This was a key experience for Womersley, who was to repeat this trip some twenty years later, this time accompanied by Sheffield City councillors, in a journey that would inspire the city planning in the renewal of Sheffield. He left London to become Herbert J. Rowse's Principal Assistant in the Liverpool practice of Bradshaw, Rowse and Harker, designing municipal buildings in St. Helens and Fylde and working in the redevelopment of parts of Liverpool and Birkenhead. He married a school teacher, Jean Roberts, who he met whilst walking in Bridge of Orchy in the Scottish Highlands. Together, they had two sons, Richard (1944–1985) and John Womersley (1941–2017).

== Northampton ==
In 1946 Womersley was appointed Borough Architect of Northampton, subsequently being made Borough Architect and Town Planning Officer. Believing that housing should be inseparable from town planning, Womersley's designs included shops, schools, colleges, bus garages, markets, fire stations, libraries, public houses and places of worship. The national housing shortage, coupled with rising building costs necessitated the provision of simple, low cost housing made with good quality materials. On 8 November 1951, the block of four Hopley Houses on Winchester Road, Delapre were ceremoniously opened, providing proof that a terraced house that could accommodate a family of five could be built for £1083, one third less than the average cost of council houses of the same type and constructed in three and a half months, rather than twelve.

One of the first to experiment with Radburn Design Housing, 'Hopley' cottage housing was linked by a footpath system separating pedestrians from roads. Driven by his belief that the motor vehicle had the potential to be a ‘wrecker of the environment’ as well as impacting upon the senses of man, Womersley wrote on the design of his Eastfield estate:

In Eastfield, footpaths branching from the pavement of the spine road give pedestrian access to the front entrances of houses along each Green and connect at the other end with the footpaths in the Park. In order to encourage children to play on this, small paved play areas were incorporated adjacent to the branch footpaths… Being as remote as possible from both service roads and the main spine road, these were really safe. Kitchens were planned to overlook the pedestrian ways so that mothers could keep their children in view.

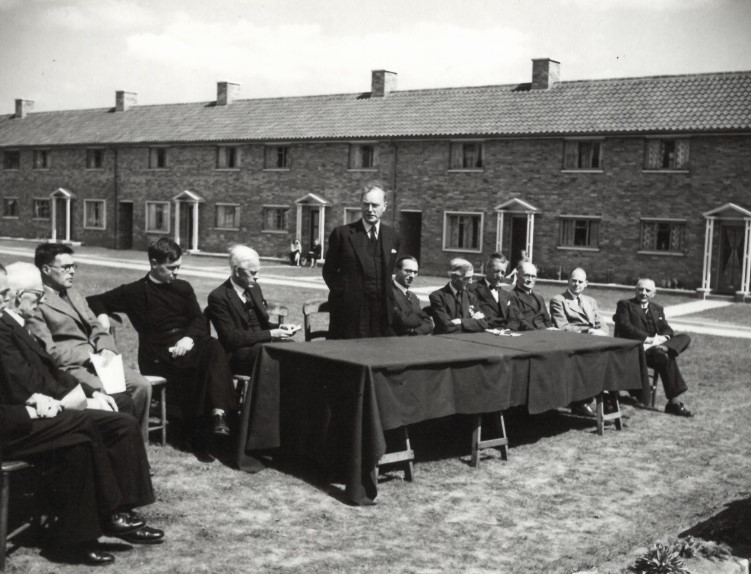
Opening of the 'Hopley' Houses, Northampton 1951

Trees were carefully preserved, houses being grouped around them. Similar attention to detail is evident at King's Heath, Dallington Fields and his other estates. It was in Northampton that Womersley's first ‘point block’ was built, the 10 storey St. Katherine's Court, balancing the limitations of space with housing shortage and allowing people to walk a short distance to work, unmolested by traffic. This was Womersley's first venture into building upwards: multi-storey living. Womersley's drawings of the layout and dwelling types were passed on to his successor, Brian Bunch, who succeeded him as Northampton Borough Architect ad Town Planning Officer in 1953.

== Sheffield: flood the valleys, plant the tops ==
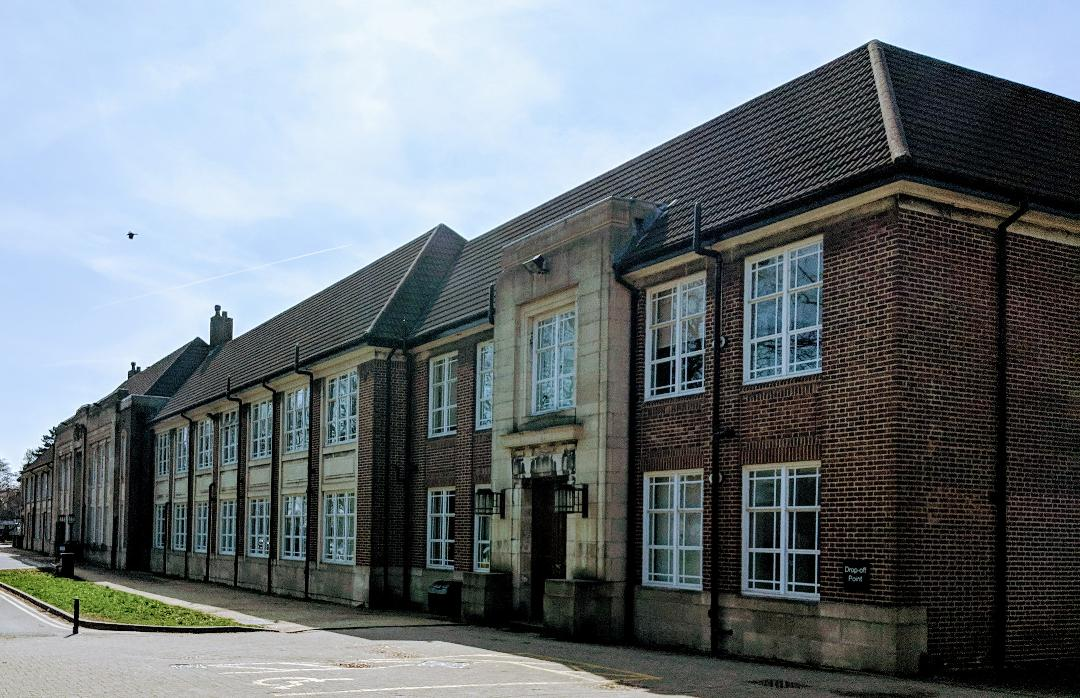
Davies & Womersley, High Storrs School

With W.G. Davies, Womersley had designed the now Grade II listed building, High Storrs School, Ecclesall, in 1933. In 1953, he returned to the city, having been selected from 40 competitors for the post of City Architect of Sheffield. The specification was created in the post-war 1952 Development Plan, which identified 20,000 unfit houses in a plan to relieve overcrowding in heavily industrial areas of Sheffield. The plan estimated that 2,700 acres would be required to house the population, although there were only 2,400 acres available. The inhabitants of the slums were removed to council estates on Hallamshire, with the impact upon the tenants of costlier rents and longer distances for them to travel to work. It became apparent, following a failed application for the city boundaries to be extended, that the pre-war density of population would need to be addressed. The main challenges were the need for slum clearance, a shortage of land on which to house the population and the immobility of heavy industry. In order to re-house most people near to their original homes with adequate space in an attractive environment, use had to be made of land that was considered too steep for development using a combination of high and low rise buildings.

Laying out his vision, Womersley made the commitment that:

If we are to design cities and not merely housing we must go beyond the individual dwelling and portray the grand design.

He led Sheffield Council leaders on visits to sites across Europe, to share his vision of "an audacious programme of building around the city." What he was about to achieve in one decade was the first benign urban transformation on a scale of a city of over half a million people that we had ever seen in Britain.

Womersley was an advocate of high rise living and it was seen as a solution to slum clearance, being raised at two major RIBA symposia in 1955 and 1957, where he suggested that 50% of the population wished to inhabit high-rise accommodation. He determined that this would be the solution to the difficulties presented by the Sheffield specification and in order to do so, he established an imaginative and highly enthusiastic team, including Ivor Smith and Jack Lynn, committed to creating the good quality accommodation for people to live in. The city's topology, three main land masses containing steep escarpment, rolling plateau and a series of ridges, presented a challenge but allowed many of them to be visually related; "with the hilltop architectural compositions producing something of the fascination of the Italian hill towns" that had inspired Womersley in the 1930s. The city centre, which, up until then had been neglected, with all council resources directed towards housing, was to be redeveloped under Womersley's department, including the Hole in the Road and the Castle Market, designed by Andrew Derbyshire with J. Stuart Mackie. The Castle Market was intended to form the cornerstone of a pedestrianised city centre which was as pioneering as Park Hill. Unfortunately it never progressed and the market was demolished in 2015.

The Greenhill site, Beauchief and Greenhill, presented an opportunity to house 10,000 people, but in order to do so, it had to be drained, with the water pumped back into the city system. Utilising the Radburn style hedgerows and footpaths, in accordance with his beliefs, to provide separation of pedestrian from traffic, the 70 person per acre density was achieved using three thirteen-storey towers for child-free domiciles; four-storey maisonettes for small families; and two-storey terraces with corner flats for larger families.

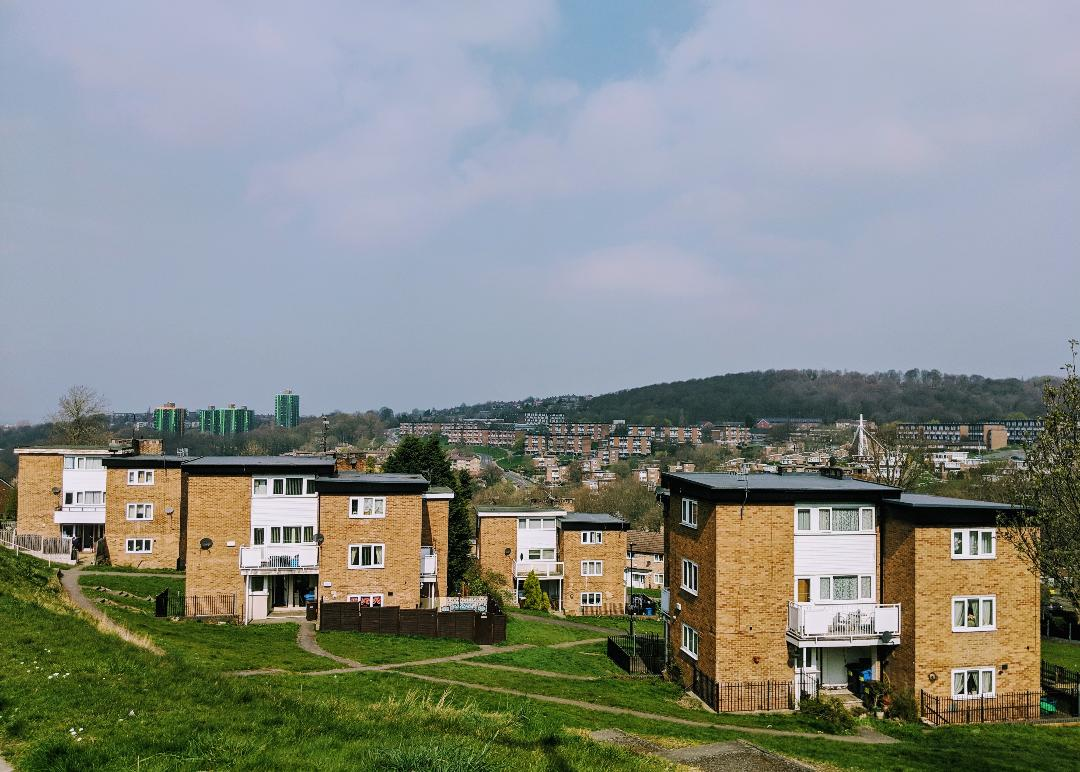
Gleadless Estate, Sheffield

Gleadless Valley was ear marked to house 17,000 people but, with slopes averaging 1 in 8, the landscape presented a challenge that was transformed into an advantage and today remains the most spectacular of his many estates. Writing in The Builder in 1963, Womersley noted:

By arranging for dwellings to be terraced up the hillside with living rooms on the upper floors, a view can be obtained over the roofs of the houses below. Specially designed patio houses in the Rollestone neighbourhood at Gleadless and Norfolk Park will exploit its topographical position.

The estate has a footpath system independent of roads linking three distinct neighbourhoods, each with its own infant and junior schools and shopping centre and comprises two-storey houses, three-storey flats, four and six storey maisonettes and three tower-blocks crowning the hilltop.

Following transformation of the two of Sheffield's central hills, Netherthorpe and Woodside, attention was turned to the third, Park Hill, which was to become the largest listed building in Europe. Commenting in Melvyn Bragg's Reel History of Britain, Charlie Luxton describes it as, "one of Britain’s best examples of what modern council housing can be about. The idea was to create a sense of community with these streets in the sky… They invested in the infrastructure, they invested in the shops, the schools, the playgrounds". Park Hill's principal architects, Jack Lynn and Ivor Smith, were appointed almost straight from college without formal interviews. Inspired by Le Corbusier’s Unite d’Habitation in Marseille they created these ‘streets in the sky’ on the steeply sloping land near the city centre. Every effort was made to establish a community feel – the decks, or ‘streets’, facilitating doorstep gossip and encouraging children to play ‘outside’. The streets, it is affectionately recalled, were wide enough for milk floats and tricycles and importantly separated man and child from traffic. Like the sheltered balconies of each flat, the decks provided magnificent views. They were given the street names of the original slums, Norwich, Long Henry and Hague, with previous neighbours housed close to one another as far as possible. Contained in the grounds were shops, schools, children's play areas, pubs, concierges and a police station. Womersley reflected on his team's architectural developments across Sheffield that:

We have envisaged each scheme, be it new development on virgin territory or the redevelopment of a slum area, as a piece of civic design to be carefully integrated with the whole Town Plan. Most of our projects were important additions to the total environment – the more so because the topographical characteristics of the city allow many of them to relate visually to one another.

However, sound proofing was very poor, it was not envisaged that every flat would house a television and parking provision was negligible due to the focus on provision of green space in which to walk. For the major high rise developments, Hyde Park and Park Hill, from the 1970s, a lack of maintenance; the loss of most of the caretakers and of the police station led to vandalism and vermin. With Hyde Park, the ‘keep’ of the mega-structures, it is acknowledged that Womersley over-reached himself – the building was remote and it was exposed to the elements – the magnificent view unable to compensate for the wind on the landings. The Labour government had gone and with it, the era of mass social housing had disappeared also. After a series of accidents, one in which a girl in Hyde Park was killed when a television set was dropped from a balcony, door after door were boarded up. Hyde Park was demolished and, had it not been listed in 1998, Park Hill would have suffered the same fate.

It was decided that the responsibility for town planning would be removed from the architects and placed in the control of the City Engineers and with this, the ability of Womersley's department to bring about social change through housing was depleted. Perhaps ironically, a series of major roads were built through the city and man and machine were forced to co-exist. The ethos of the department was collapsed. It was rare for architects to exert control over the development of roads in relation to buildings and this was a freedom that would continue to create conflict for Womersley in his later career.

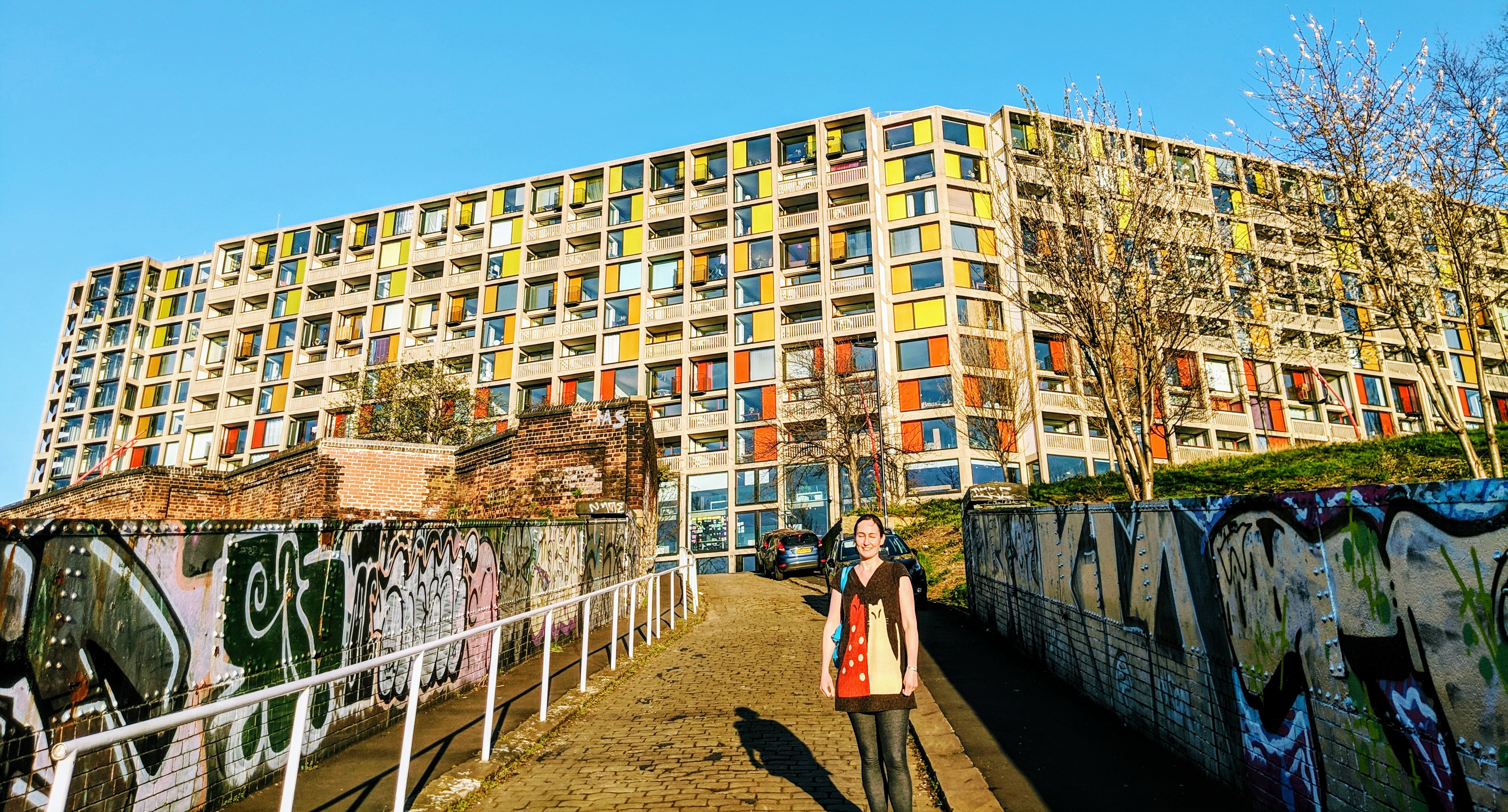
Park Hill Estate Regenerated

In 2006 the developers Urban Splash secured agreement with the council to complete a regeneration programme to provide a ‘mixed and multigenerational community’ – but one with relatively few ‘affordable’ homes. Park Hill continues its regeneration today under the auspices of Urban Splash and many of Womersley's department's developments across Sheffield and the town centre remain.

== Manchester ==
By 1964, the input of City Architect into the development of the city, along with the route for the M1, was in the hands of the City Engineer and Womersley left Sheffield to join Hugh Wilson as partner in private practice in Manchester, taking with him six of his Sheffield staff, including Jack Lynn and J. Stuart Mackie.

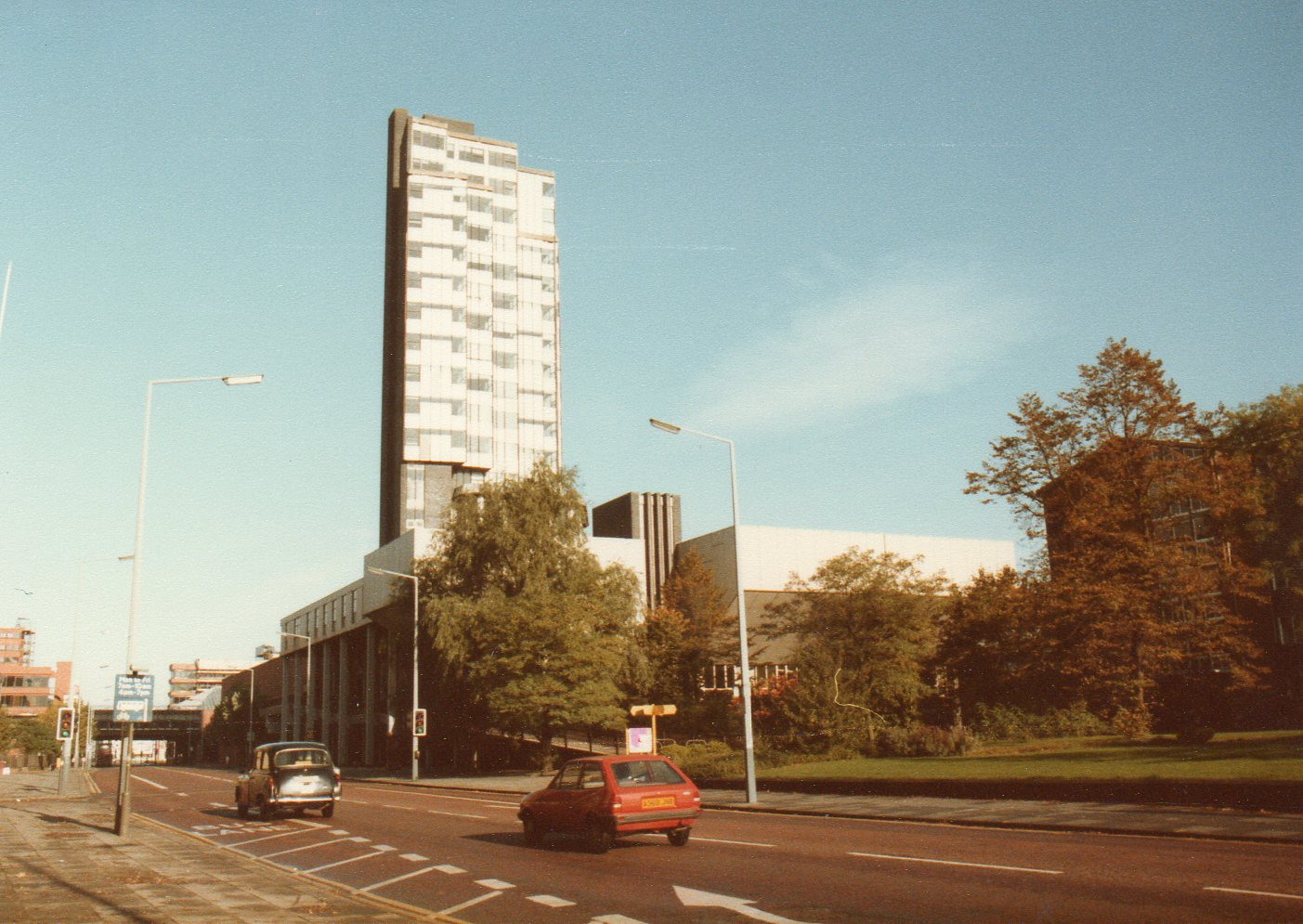
Oxford Road, Manchester, 1985; Precinct Centre (far left), Computer Building (left) and Mathematics Building (centre)

The firm planned Manchester Education Precinct, which unified the Manchester Business School, Manchester Royal Infirmary, Manchester University and city colleges. The Manchester Education Precinct Plan covered a larger area than any campus in Europe, extending two-and-a-half miles out of the city centre and covering several square miles (280 acres). The plan was a joint enterprise of the City Council, the university and the area health authority. As well as student residences, lecture halls and advisory services the plan included restaurants, bookshops and banks. The combined population of staff and students from the six or seven institutions was then about 25,000. As well as the politics involved in working with several disunited institutions, there were huge physical problems. The team, including Tony Pass, encountered great difficulty implementing the vehicle separation which had become their trademark policy. Footways had to be elevated 6m from ground level to be above the traffic, but funding was delivered piecemeal, resulting in pedestrian walkways, ramps and bridges that were incorporated into isolated buildings at great cost, connecting to nothing in particular. This also presented problems with the entrances of buildings as most of them subsequently had two access points, one at ground level and the other six metres above, which proved difficult to staff.

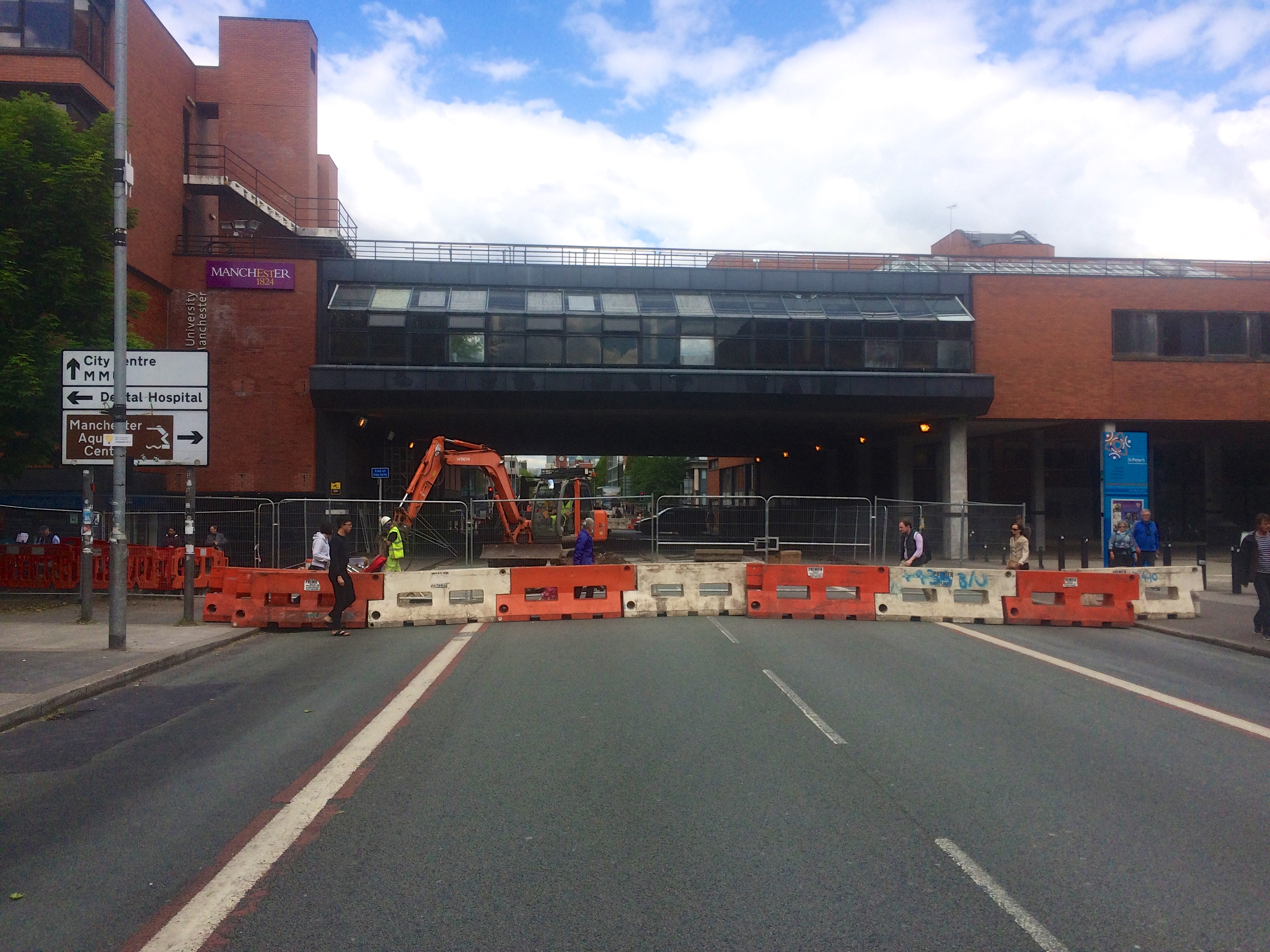
The Precinct Centre bridge

It was partly to try to unify the overall Plan that the next phase, Precinct Centre was conceived. It was sited at a ‘hinge point’ between the colleges and residences to provide a commercial heart, mainly at walkway level. The Precinct Centre incorporated a shopping centre, a business school, offices and student accommodation across six floors. This model of mixed-purpose ‘streets in the sky’ was designed to provide a lively University hub. Despite difficulties connecting adjacent buildings, the planning of the campus, with careful consideration to separating pedestrian from car, was well received and Wilson and Womersley's detailed survey and analysis of human and vehicular traffic, parking requirements, and public transport, environment and buildings facilitated free movement of its population.

Enough of the individual major development sites Maths and Computer Science buildings, Business School, Royal Northern College of Music were linked to make the Precinct Centre viable, but only just. It was planned that the walkways would be extended to All Saints and the city, but this was thwarted by the reluctance of the new Polytechnic, and the central theme of the Plan was abandoned.

In managing slum clearance, Manchester experienced the same difficulties encountered by Sheffield City Council with shortage of land, but, unlike Sheffield, was opposed to high rise living. Despite concentrating efforts on the refurbishment of existing architecture, rather than demolition and renewal, the area of Hulme had been bulldozed by the 1960s and a vision for Hulme close to that expounded by the Park Hill estate emerged. This was the third major commission for Wilson and Womersley. Recreating a sense of community such as those envisaged in the ‘streets in the sky’ model of Park Hill seemed to be a fitting solution. However, despite planning to combine the social amenities afforded at Park Hill, such as self-contained shops and schooling, pubs, churches and bus stops, Hulme Crescents, completed in 1972, lacked the focus on community that was integral to Womersley's work in Sheffield. Park Hill had exploited the hills surrounding Sheffield city centre for practical and scenic effect: Manchester offered no such opportunity. Moreover, the population was effectively cut off from the rest of the city with the development of the Princess parkway and Mancunian Way; the new building techniques were poorly understood and imperfectly applied. The progressive collapse of Ronan Point high rise flats in London due to a gas explosion resulted in all similar concrete panel system-built schemes having to replace gas central heating with electric heating which tenants could not afford to use, leading to rampant condensation. The resultant problems with damp and poor sewerage system attracted vermin and social deprivation accompanied. They were demolished less than 20 years later.

Working to a specification which did not support his investment in social facilities such as schools, leisure facilities and shops, left Womersley vulnerable to criticism levelled at creating structures that did not support communities. The rapid change of fortune and reputation that he suffered in the 1970s hurt him badly. and he returned his attention to single purpose structures.

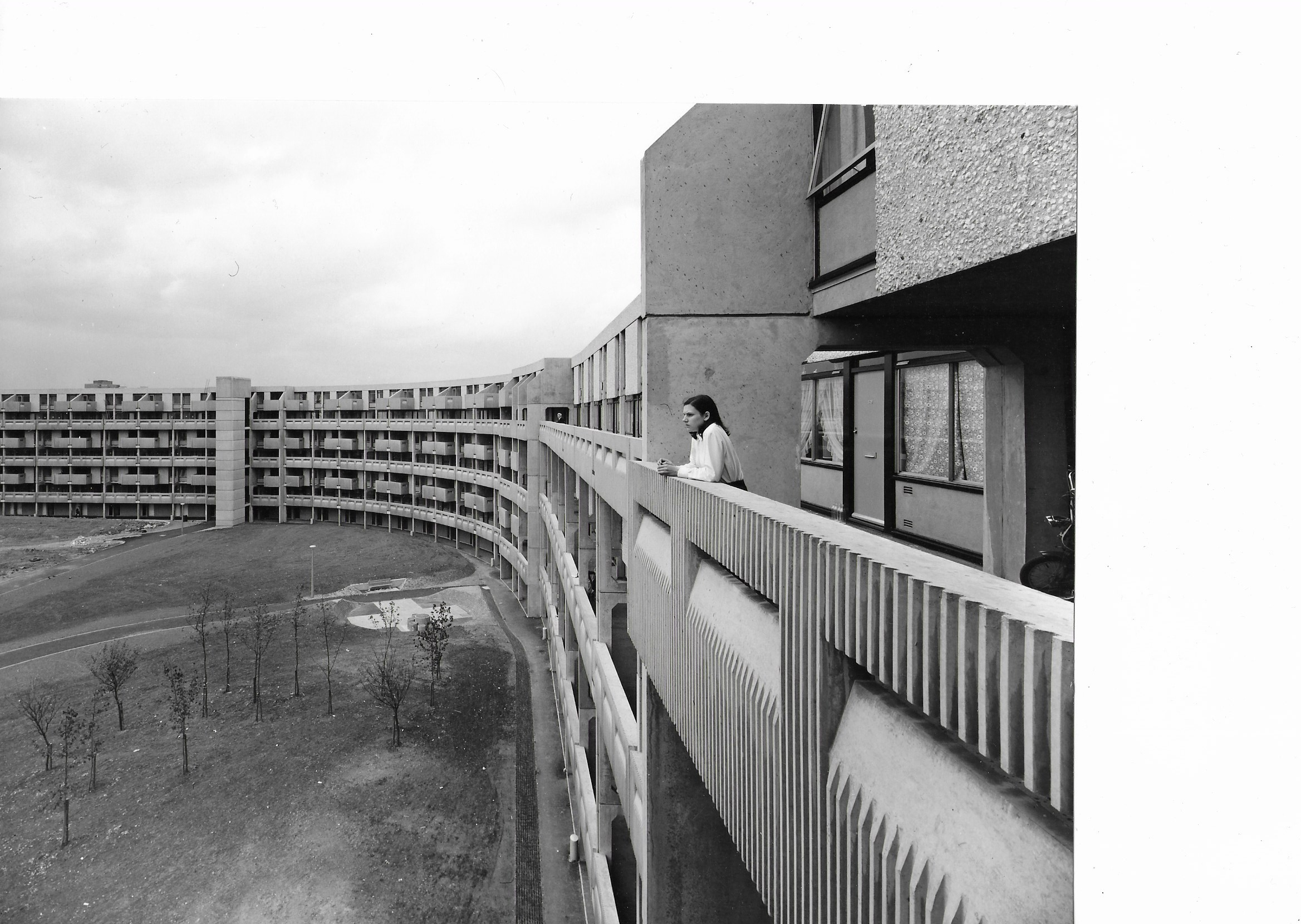
The Crescents, 1972

Commissioned by Manchester Corporation, Womersley was not afforded the freedom in private practice that he had enjoyed in Sheffield. Wilson & Womersley were employed to design the largest covered shopping centre of its time, the Arndale Centre, constructed in 1972 but were restricted by conflicts with the City Engineer and with the limiting specification that the display windows would be introspective, a feature which the architects warned, "would not be attractive." This American-inspired design provoked the author Bill Bryson to observe that the mustard tiles rendered the Arndale, "the world's largest gents' lavatory."

More successful was involvement in aid to the City in its problems of land shortage during the 1960s. The practice was commissioned by a joint committee of the Cheshire County, Manchester City and Wilmslow Borough Councils to prepare a Comprehensive Plan for the Development of Wilmslow. Published in 1966, the Plan was followed by the construction of housing for Mancunians at Colshaw Farm.

In 1976, Womersley was appointed Chairman of the Albert Memorial Restoration Committee, which raised £50,000 to conserve the stonework and rescue the Albert Memorial, Albert Square, Manchester, from being dismantled by Manchester City Council. Memorial Committees had been set up throughout Britain following the death of Queen Victoria's Consort in 1861 and the statue was designed by Matthew Noble, a statue set within a canopy in the style of the Scott monument in Edinburgh. The bricks were donated by the Manchester Brickmakers Protection Society and was unveiled in 1867 and gifted to the City of Manchester. However, a regular maintenance programme was not put in place and the monument deteriorated, partly from the iron railings being removed during the ‘Scrap for Victory’ campaign in World War II and the City Council resolved to dismantle it in 1971. Manchester's Albert Memorial Appeal Committee was formed in February 1976 and appointed Womersley as its chairman, with him, Antony Pass from the Planning Department. The committee were tasked to convince a city that a purely decorative and unfashionable monument which had been condemned not long before was worth salvaging by public subscription. The revenue for the original memorial was raised by public revenue, a fact noted in the inscription on the base of the memorial, and the funds for its restoration were also financed by public appeal, with car and lapel stickers produced to raise awareness. It is listed as a Grade 1 Building of Special Architectural and Historic Interest.

== Huddersfield ==
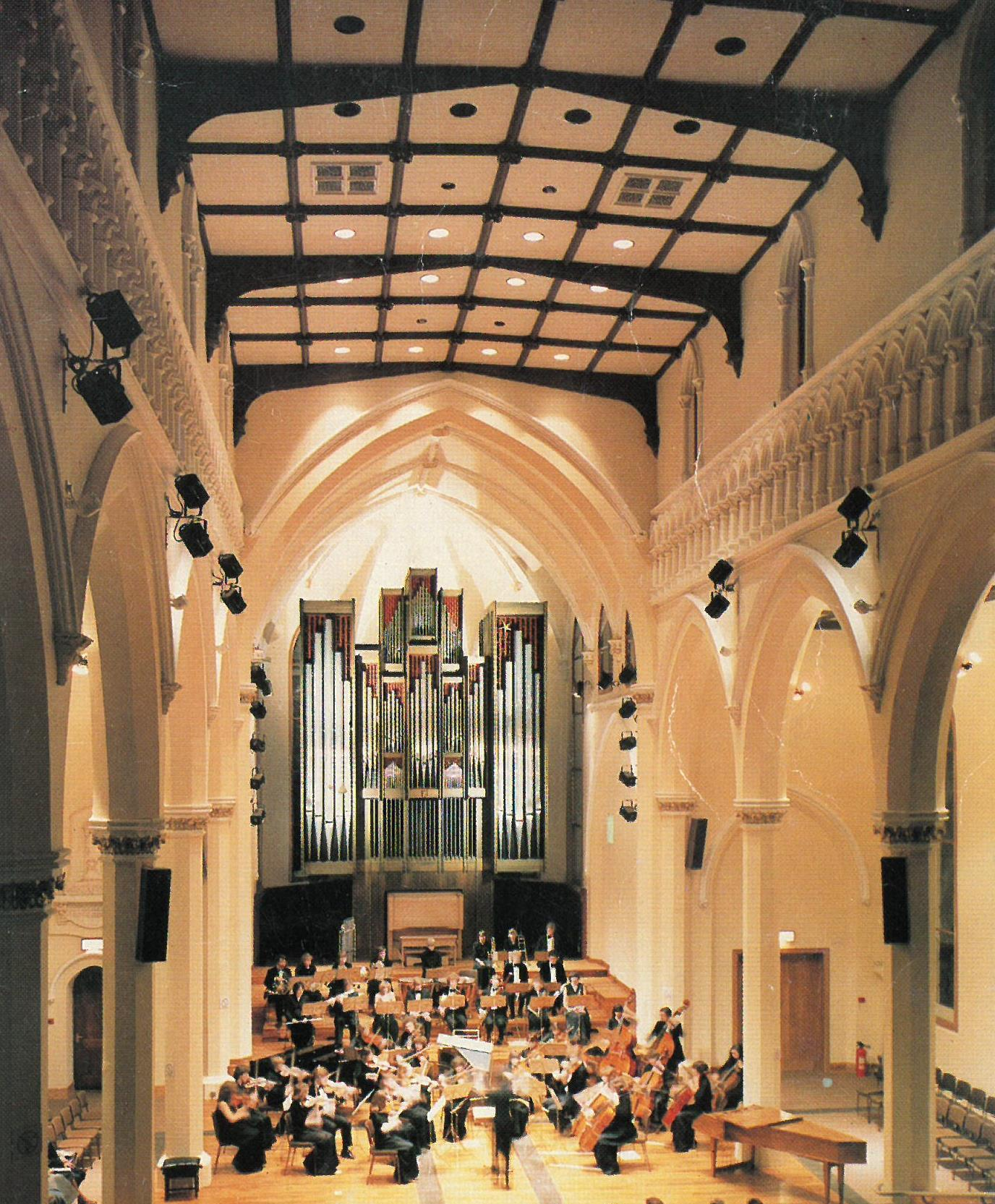
St. Paul's Concert Hall, Huddersfield 1980

The firm undertook re-design of the precinct of Huddersfield Polytechnic Campus and later in 1979, the conversion of St. Paul's Church in Huddersfield into a concert hall. On awarding him a Fellowship for the redevelopment of the Campus in 1977, Dr. Stewart Armstrong, Deputy Rector, said of Womersley, "Only a planner with both vision and courage could have foreseen the Polytechnic campus as it is today. The splendid Central Services building stands as monument to that foresight".

== The Lake District ==
In 1972 Wilson & Womersley published ‘Traffic Management in the Lake District National Park’ for Friends of the Lake District in which the terms of reference were, ‘To prepare a report on the problems raised by increasing motor traffic within the Lake District National Park and to suggest solutions for the present and future which will be in accordance with the preservation of the natural beauty of the Lake District and the rights of the public to enjoy it – an area close to Womersley's heart, choosing to retire to Bowness-on-Windermere. Evoking the words of John Bunyan:

I love being in places where there is no rattling of coaches or rumbling of wheels.

Wilson and Womersley conducted a detailed survey of the roads, traffic flow and natural beauty spots throughout Cumbria and proposed parking and traffic management solutions to balance the peak flow of tourist traffic with the preservation of the natural surroundings.

The Practice had offices in London and Scotland and was as well known for town planning work as for architecture. In 1989, the Practice merged with the then largest architectural PLC in the country, D. Y. Davis, a company that collapsed during the recession of the nineties.

Womersley began to develop symptoms of Parkinson's Disease in 1971 and died in Glasgow on 28 October 1990.

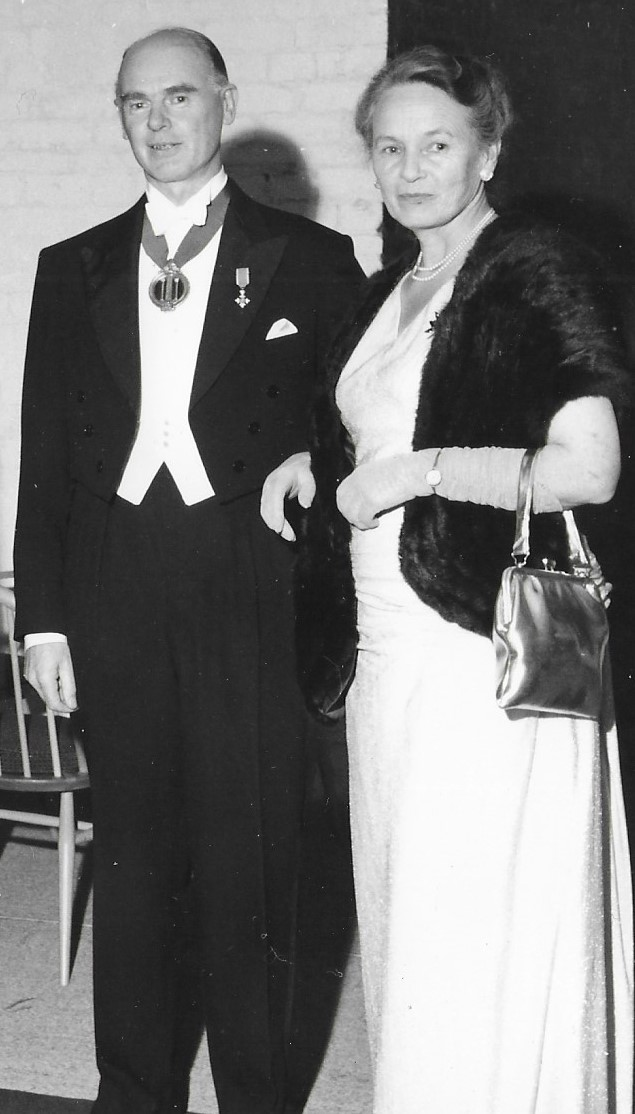
Lewis & Jean Womersley on collecting his CBE

== Awards ==
1933 Nicholson Travelling Scholarship.

1950 Ministry of Housing and Local Government Medal for parts of Kings Heath, Northampton.

1951 Builder competition, won with his Deputy, Geoffrey Hopkinson for the Hopley House. The competition was to design a house for five people costing £1000.

1953 RIBA Bronze medal for the shopping centre at King's Heath, Northampton.

1958 RIBA bronze medal for the bus garage, Greenland Road, Northampton.

1958 Distinction in Town Planning by the Royal Town Planning Institute.

1960 Commander of the British Empire (CBE).

1962 MOHLG Award for Good Design.

1962 RIBA Housing Medal and Diploma for Park Hill Estate.

1966 Honorary Degree of Doctor of Laws, Sheffield University.

1971 Fellowship of Huddersfield Polytechnic.
