= Hulme Crescents =

Former housing development in Manchester, England

Coordinates: 53°27′59.6″N 2°15′12.6″W

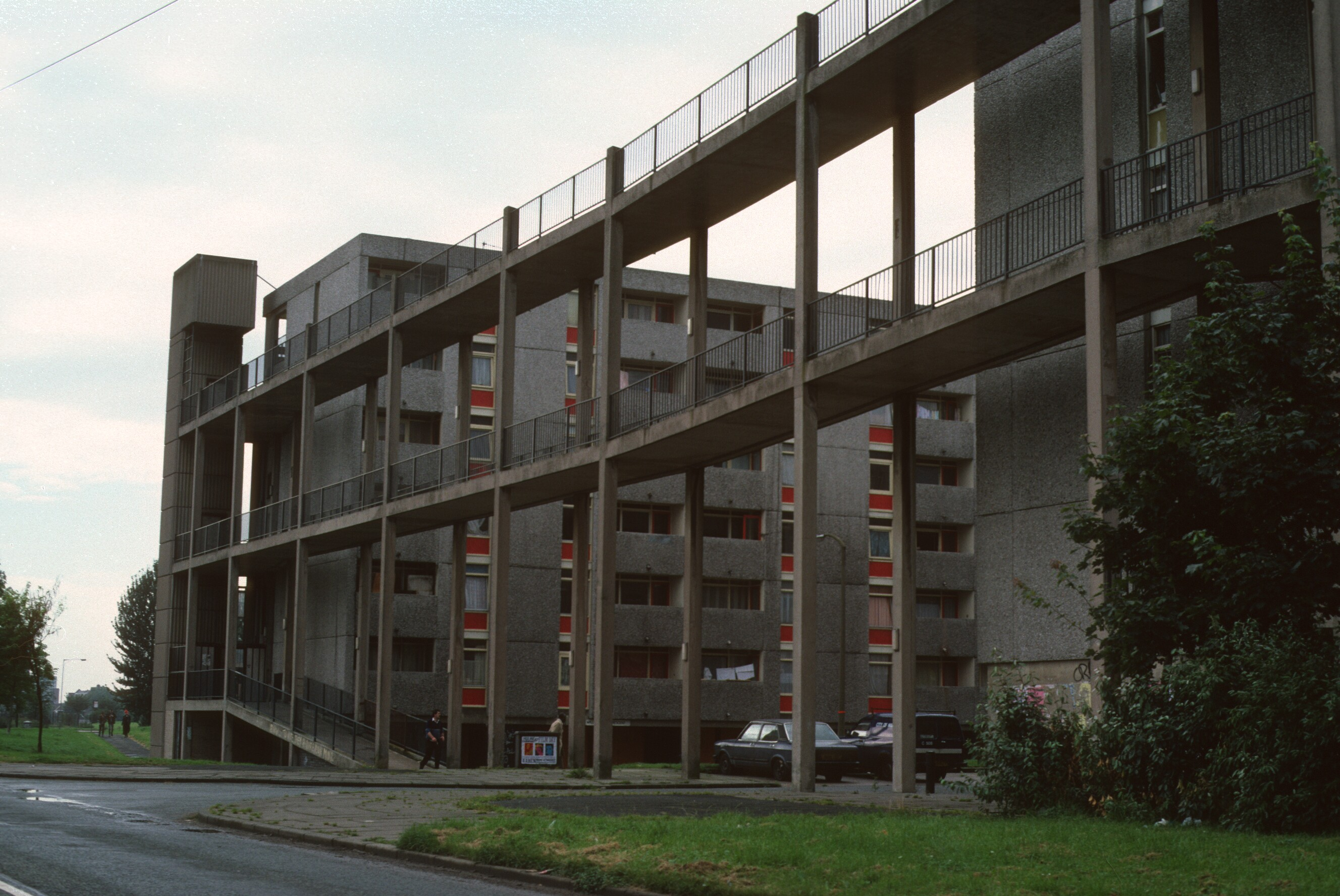
- Interactive map of Hulme Crescents

General information
- Location: Manchester, England
- Status: Adult-only from 1974, Abandoned in 1984; Demolished in 1993
- Category: High-rise, high density residential social housing

Construction
- Constructed: 1972
- Architect: Wilson & Wormersley
- Style: Brutalist architecture

Listing
- Demolished: 1993–1995

Other information
- Governing body: Manchester City Council
- Famous residents: Nico, Alain Delon, Mark Kermode

Hulme Crescents was a large housing development in the Hulme district of Manchester, England. Hulme was the largest public housing development in Europe, encompassing 3,284 deck-access homes and capacity for over 13,000 people, but was marred by serious construction and design errors. Demolition of the Crescents, comprising 923 dwellings, began in 1993, 21 years after it was constructed in 1972.

The Crescents were described by the Architects' Journal as "Europe's worst housing stock... hideous system-built deck-access block which gave Hulme its unsavoury reputation." The Hulme Crescents had implications for new housing in Manchester and signalled the end of the streets in the sky idea popular throughout the 1960s and 1970s in the United Kingdom. After demolition, Hulme was redeveloped in the 1990s with a mix of low-rise to medium-rise housing.

== History ==
=== Proposal ===
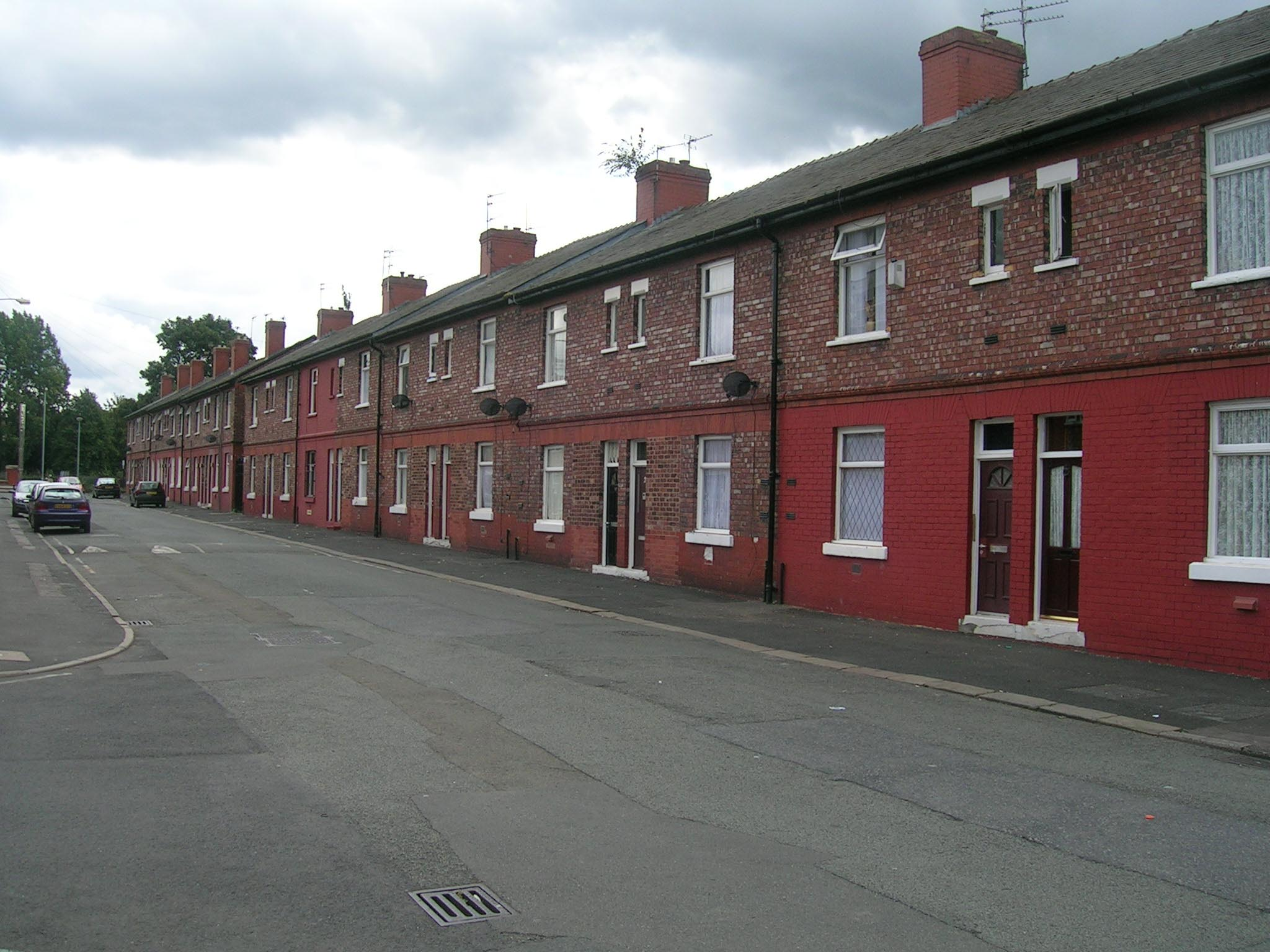
A terraced street in Hulme. Similar streets in the area were cleared to build Hulme Crescents.

In 1945, the Manchester Corporation published the long-term development plan. The development plan described the existing housing stock in Hulme as "Endless rows of grimy houses: no gardens, no parks, no community buildings, no hope.” Manchester Corporation historically refrained from the high-rise residential tower block schemes that were eminent in other British cities such as neighbouring Salford. By the 1960s a need for high-density housing had become apparent and Hulme with vacant land and housing stock perceived to be outdated was an ideal area for new housing.

In 1969, during the housing development, Nikolaus Pevsner wrote of "the biggest redevelopment area of Manchester, many say of England, and some of Europe. At the time of writing whole blocks lie waste, streets are blocked and new streets are made”. The centrepiece of the new housing development would be the Hulme Crescents. The Crescents were designed by Hugh Wilson and J. L. Womersley – the latter was in charge of the delivery of Park Hill flats in Sheffield in the 1960s and the much-maligned Manchester Arndale retail development in the 1970s.

The housing scheme consisted of four south-facing u-shaped blocks, seven storeys high. Each block contained a variety of flats, from one to five bedrooms in size, each with a private balcony. To protect the occupants from noise and provide privacy, the only rooms that faced onto the decks were kitchens and dining rooms and the decks were sufficiently wide to allow milk floats to pass by. These looked onto a landscaped communal area intended for public use, containing play parks and trees were intended to be planted that would conceal the garage floor level and give the impression that the buildings floated at first floor level. Similar to the Park Hill model, the estate was to contain shops, churches and public amenities to ensure that the population could exist free from traffic.

Each crescent was named after a distinguished architect – Adam, Nash, Barry and Kent – a decision which appeared seriously misjudged after the failings of the Crescents surfaced. Womersley said: "We feel that the analogy we have made with Georgian London and Bath is entirely valid. By the use of similar shapes and proportions, large-scale building groups and open spaces, and, above all, by skilful landscaping and extensive tree planning, it is our endeavour to achieve at Hulme a solution to the problems of twentieth-century living which would be the equivalent in quality that reached the requirements of eighteenth-century Bloomsbury and Bath."

=== Failures ===
Two years after opening, Manchester City Council deemed The Crescents unsuitable for families and the housing scheme became adult-only. The decks had intended to be streets in the sky where neighbours would see one another and children could play unsupervised.

Serious design flaws such as thick concrete balconies prevented residents from seeing one another. Worst of all, the balconies had a horizontal aperture which allowed curious children to climb onto the balcony ledge. Children climbed the balcony ledge by putting a foot in the aperture and lifting themselves onto the ledge. In 1974 this flaw came to a head when a five-year-old child died after falling from a balcony. After the incident, a petition was launched and was signed by 643 residents who wished to be rehoused. Manchester City Council agreed to re-house families from The Crescents and the flats were offered to students and all-adult households.

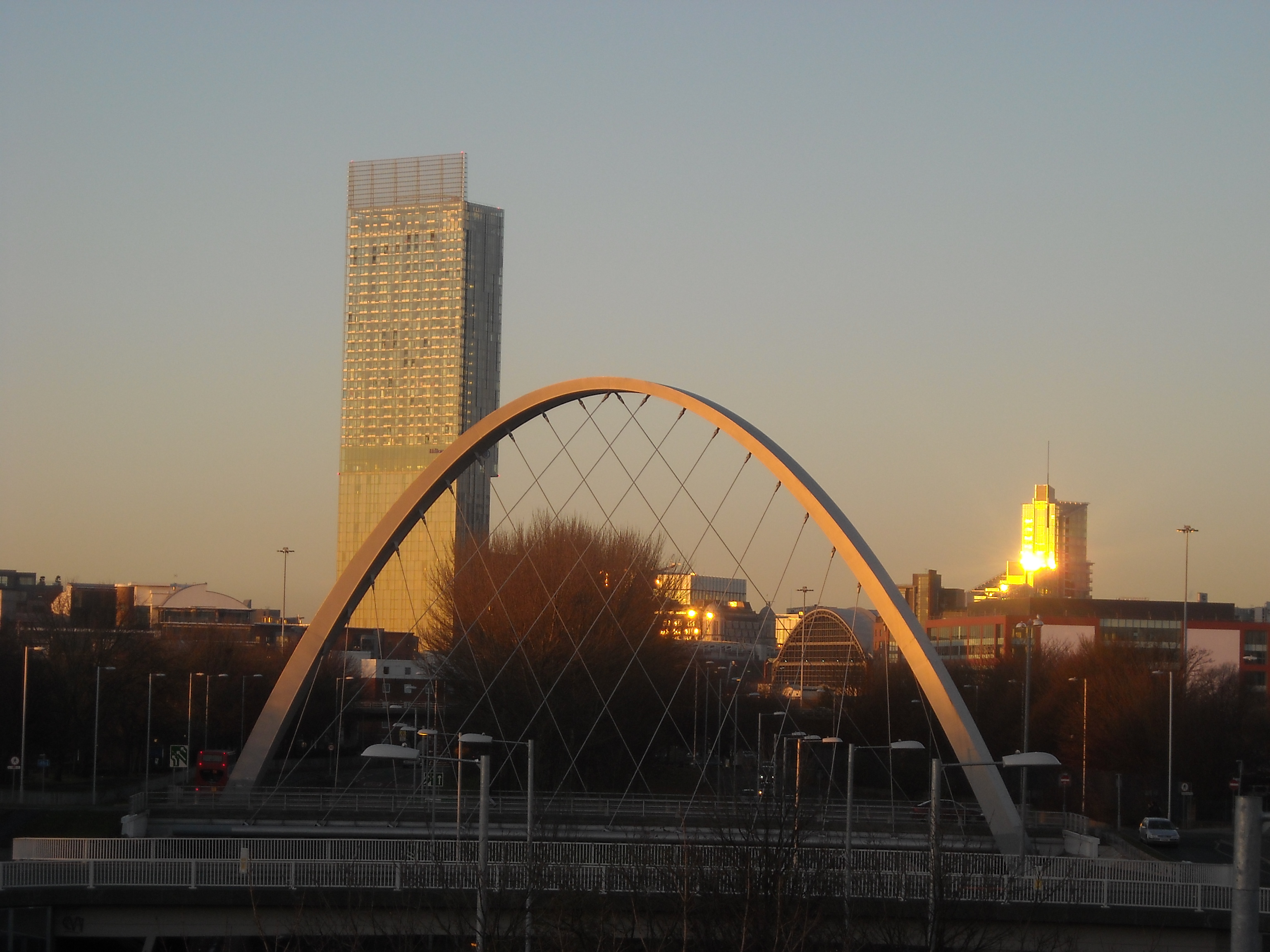
The Hulme Arch Bridge was built in 1997 to re-establish links to the city eliminated by the construction of Princess Parkway Road

The new Mancunian Way flyover and Princess Parkway road left residents feeling isolated and "cut off" from the rest of the city. The feeling persisted for decades and the Hulme Arch Bridge, built in 1997, aimed to re-establish this link to the city. Police did not patrol the upper decks despite the intention of streets in the sky and quick responses to incidents was often complicated by the scale of the estate, which totalled over a quarter of a mile of passageways. Responses to emergencies were also complicated by faulty lifts which had been described as "usually filthy" even when in service.

Construction was rushed, building techniques were improperly understood and not sufficiently applied. Furthermore, the collapse of Ronan Point in London following a gas explosion had led to gas heating being discontinued in high rise accommodation and the occupants could no longer afford to heat their homes. The resultant damp coupled with inadequate sewage system attracted vermin and the flats were no longer fit for inhabitation. The Crescents, therefore, were not heated by radiators – but by advanced underfloor heating which was in an early stage of development during the 1970s. The architects proposed underfloor heating in the proposal stages in the late 1960s and The Crescents were completed by 1972. However the architects did not foresee the 1973 oil crisis and consequently many tenants could not afford the heating costs.

Pest infestation was a problem from the outset due to serious failures in the construction and design process. The subsoil was not cleansed from pest infestation before construction of the Crescents. Cockroaches were prevalent in the undamp-proofed slum houses due to the high water and moisture availability. The Crescents were district heated with long ducts linking flats together. Cockroaches and mice thrived on the warmth and ducts provided a constant source of food in waste areas. The use of asbestos in construction compounded the issue and meant that treating ducts with pesticide to remove the cockroaches was practically impossible due to the dangers of removing asbestos.

The long list of failures gave the Crescents national notoriety. In 1975, just three years after opening, a survey was conducted which found 96.3% of residents wanted to leave the Crescents and be re-housed. In 1978, the Granada Television investigative programme World in Action questioned the suitability of Hulme Crescent. The Guardian described the development as "a morass in which design faults and tenants' revulsion at their environment have combined to produce a staggering number of maintenance demands and angry howls of neglect".

In 1980 economist Milton Friedman visited the Crescents in the fourth episode of his documentary series Free to Choose. The Crescents' residents were used as an example for his critique of the welfare state. Friedman cites the Crescents as an example of what happens where welfare policy goes even further than his previous example of public housing projects in The Bronx, New York.

=== Abandonment ===
By 1984, the Crescents had become so undesired by prospective residents that Manchester City Council, which lacked sufficient funds to demolish the housing scheme, stopped charging rents entirely from tenants. However the council did still provide electricity to the building to those who needed it. The Crescents became an eclectic place for various subculture groups such as bohemians, criminals and squatters. Unwanted by the council, occupants resorted to altering The Crescents themselves. A recording studio called The Kitchen—"a dive ... a very basic derelict concrete room with nothing in there", created from three knocked-through flats—attracted many musicians from 1986; it was later operated as a late night club, described as a "much wilder alternative" to the nearby Haçienda club. Creative residents proceeded to put their own stamp on the building and covered the dreary grey concrete surfaces in graffiti.

In the book A Guide to the New Ruins of Great Britain (2010), Owen Hatherley said that the sense of dereliction made The Crescents a breeding ground for creativity. "All the things bemoaned as deleterious to family life . . . the complexity of the blocks, the noise and sense of height, the lack of a feeling of 'ownership' in the communal areas" turned out to be "perfect" for a different sort of tenant, Manchester's young bohemians, who relished the estate's air of decaying modernism. By the early 80s, it had an art house cinema, club nights run by the soon-to-be-famous Factory Records, and even a "Hulme look" of intense youths in baggy second-hand suits. Hatherley juxtaposes the difference between the Manchester of the 1980s and 2010s: "the very fact that [many] spaces were unused . . . led to a sense of possibility absent from the sewn-up, high-rent city of today".

Burglaries in the estate were so frequent that resident Mick Hucknall of Simply Red slept with an axe by his bed; film critic Mark Kermode was burgled so often he had a security door fitted—it was taken off its hinges and stolen. "Violence, muggings, poverty" were rife.

=== Demolition ===
In 1991, the government provided Manchester with £31 million to revive housing stock. It was decided that a tabula rasa approach was required and the entire Hulme Crescents were demolished from 1993 to 1995.

=== Asbestos ===
A legacy of Hulmes post war council housing has been through the deadly effects of asbestos dust. John Shiers, a campaigner and later a leading figure in Save the Children, had moved to council housing in Hulme in the late 1970s, where he discovered his and thousands of his neighbours' council properties were riddled with asbestos. He had been one of the first to speak out about the asbestos in the properties, he campaigned for change and was a founding member of the Hulme Asbestos Action Group. He died in 2011 of mesothelioma, a type of cancer associated with asbestos. Manchester City Council admitted limited liability for his death in their role as his landlord. During a Parliamentary Asbestos Seminar, it was estimated that nationally the deaths between 1968 and 2008 had exceeded 110,000.

== Post-demolition ==
Hulme was subsequently redeveloped at a cost of £400 million with input from residents, most of whom advocated a return to traditional forms of terraced and semi-detached housing. Nevertheless, some former residents formed a housing co-operative, Homes for Change, whose new building purposely replicated the Hulme estate medium-rise construction and communal walkways, known as 'the decks'.

== Notable residents ==
- Edward Barton, English poet and musician
- Ian Brown, English singer (The Stone Roses)
- Mick Hucknall, English singer (Simply Red)
- Mick Hume, English journalist
- Mike Joyce, English drummer (The Smiths)
- Mark Kermode, English film critic
- Martin Moscrop, English guitarist and trumpeter (A Certain Ratio)
- Nico, German actress, model and singer (The Velvet Underground)
- Gerald Simpson, English record producer (A Guy Called Gerald)

== See also ==
- Streets in the sky
- Park Hill, Sheffield
- Hunslet Grange Flats

== Bibliography ==
- Hartwell, Clare (2001). Pevsner Architectural Guides: Manchester. Penguin.
- Parkinson-Bailey, John (2000). Manchester: An Architectural History. Manchester University Press.
- Burridge, R. (2011). Unhealthy Housing: Research, remedies and reform. Taylor & Francis. ISBN 978-0415511711.
