= Jack Lynn (architect) =

Jack Lynn (30 October 1926 – 15 October 2013) was a British architect.

Born in North Seaton in Ashington, Lynn studied architecture at Durham University (at King's College, Newcastle – later the Newcastle University School of Architecture, Planning and Landscape), then worked for the East Anglia Health Board, followed by Coventry City Council. Gaining experience in the design of council housing, he became well known for designing the large Park Hill complex in Sheffield, with Ivor Smith. When J. Lewis Womersley, the Sheffield City Architect, moved to Manchester in 1964 to join in private practice with Sir Hugh Wilson, Lynn moved to Manchester where he was principal architect in the office. He oversaw preparation of plans for the Higher Education Precinct, for the Arndale shopping centre and for the development of Hulme, where Park Hill's principles of design proved less readily transferable to a flat site. In the late 1960s Lynn returned to the North East of England, working on the development of Newcastle University's campus and forming Kendrick and Lynn Associates, designing various Roman Catholic churches.
