= Hyde Park, Sheffield =

District of Sheffield, England

Coordinates: 53.383°N 1.45°W

Hyde Park
- Location within South Yorkshire
- Metropolitan borough: Sheffield
- Metropolitan county: South Yorkshire
- Region: Yorkshire and the Humber
- Country: England
- Sovereign state: United Kingdom
- Post town: Sheffield
- Postcode district: S2
- Dialling code: 0114
- Police: South Yorkshire
- Fire: South Yorkshire
- Ambulance: Yorkshire
- UK Parliament: Sheffield Central

Hyde Park is a district in Sheffield, England. The area is named after fields that occupied the area in the early 19th century which were used by Sheffield Cricket Club as a home venue from 1824 to 1856.

== Cricket venue ==
The area was used for important matches between 1824 and 1856 as a home venue of Sheffield Cricket Club. The fields provided enough space for up to 10 cricket matches at a time. It was the site of the first "Roses Match" between Yorkshire and Lancashire on 23–25 July 1849.

== Urban renewal ==
Hyde Park was the site of the earliest large scale slum clearance in Britain, the previous back-to-back housing having been known as "Little Chicago" in the 1930s, due to the violent crimes sometimes committed there. The area was partially razed before the Second World War.

The nearby Park Hill housing estate was built between 1957 and 1961. Designed by Jack Lynn and Ivor Smith, under the auspices of J. L. Womersley, the deck access scheme, inspired by Le Corbusier's Unité d'Habitation and the Smithson's unbuilt schemes, most notably for Golden Lane in London, was viewed as revolutionary at the time.

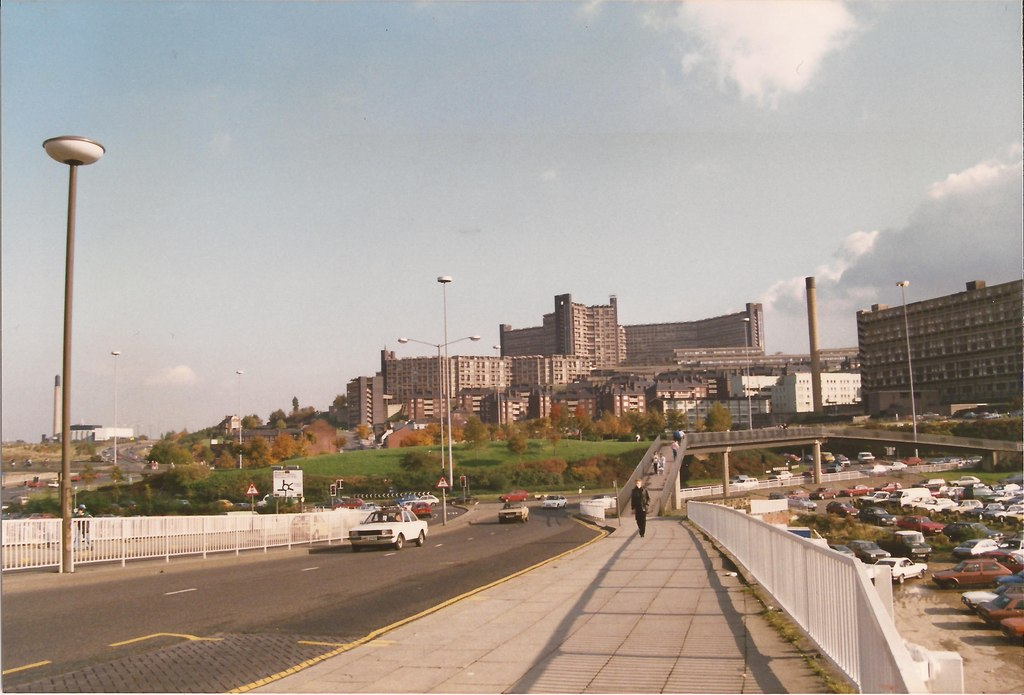
Hyde Park flats seen from Commercial Street (1987)

The plans for Hyde Park, then known as Part 2 of the Park Hill re-development scheme, were approved by the Housing Committee of Sheffield City Council on 21 February 1958. At 18 storeys, the flats were to be the highest in the country outside London. The building work was undertaken by the Council’s Public Works Department. The first residents moved into Block D in October 1963 with the project being declared complete in June 1965, when the keys to the last flats were handed over to tenants. The finished scheme had 1,313 dwellings comprising 665 flats and 648 maisonettes, housing around 4,600 people. The opening ceremony was performed on 23 June 1966 by Queen Elizabeth The Queen Mother, who gave a speech and unveiled a memorial plaque. Earlier in the day the Queen Mother had opened the Arts Tower at the University of Sheffield.

Hyde Park consisted of four blocks A, B, C and D, with each block having a public house, these were namely, The Earl Francis, The Target, The Samuel Plimsoll and The Crow’s Nest, there were shops, clinic, tenants hall, youth club and a launderette.

The concept of the flats was described as streets in the sky. Broad decks, wide enough for milk floats, had large numbers of front doors opening onto them. Each deck of structure, except the top one, has direct access to ground level at some point on the sloping site. The site also allows the roofline to remain level despite the building varying between four and thirteen stories in height. The scheme incorporates a shopping precinct and a primary school.

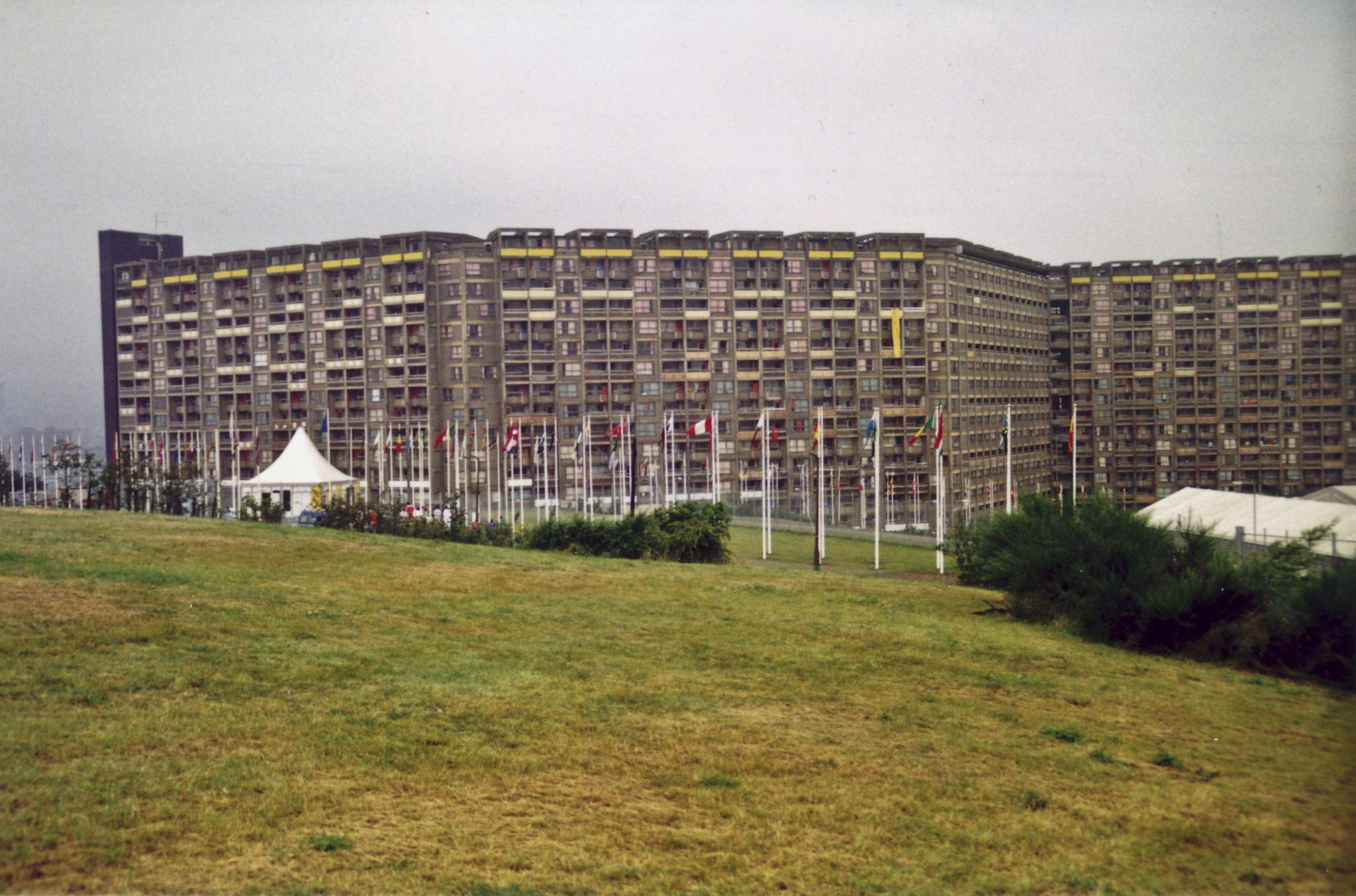
Hyde Park Flats during the 1991 Universiade

Further housing schemes were completed to similar designs, include the nearby Hyde Park estate and the Broomhall Flats and Kelvin Flats elsewhere in the city. Although initially popular and successful, over time the fabric of the buildings decayed somewhat and some other disadvantages have become apparent. The majority of buildings at Hyde Park were demolished, with the remaining blocks refurbished for use in the 1991 Summer Universiade, before returning to use as council housing. In line with this refurbishment, Hyde Park tram stop was opened on the Yellow route of the South Yorkshire Supertram network in 1994; Tram-Train services to Rotherham Parkgate commenced in 2018.

The Broomhall Flats and Kelvin Flats were demolished in the early nineties, replaced with the smaller Broomhall and Philadelphia housing estates with both private and rented houses. The Park Hill estate still survives as a grade II* listed building, and large scale renovation is under way.

== Bibliography ==
- Haygarth, Arthur (1862). Scores & Biographies, Volume 2 (1827–1840). Lillywhite.
- Haygarth, Arthur (1862). Scores & Biographies, Volume 4 (1849–1854). Lillywhite.
