= Park Hill, Sheffield =

Housing estate in Sheffield, South Yorkshire, England

Park Hill Flats
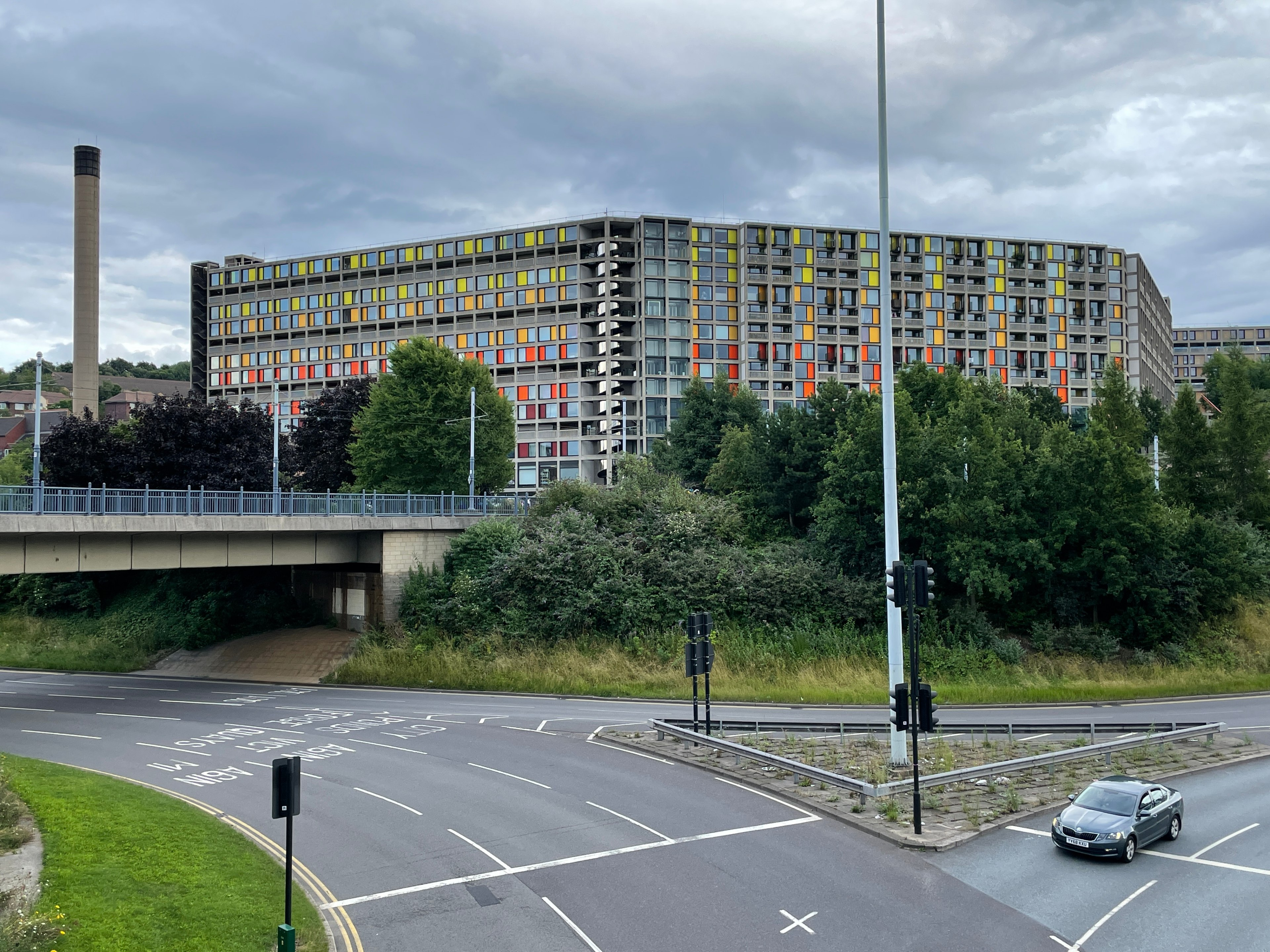
- Interactive map of Park Hill Flats

General information
- Location: Sheffield
- Coordinates: 53.380°N 1.458°W
- Status: Under renovation
- Area: 32 acres (13 ha)
- No. of units: 995
- Density: People 192 per acre (470/ha)

Construction
- Constructed: 1957–1961
- Architect: Jack Lynn Ivor Smith under J. L. Womersley
- Contractors: Direct service organisation
- Authority: Sheffield City Council
- Style: Brutalism
- Influence: Le Corbusier's Unité d'Habitation and the Smithsons

Refurbishment
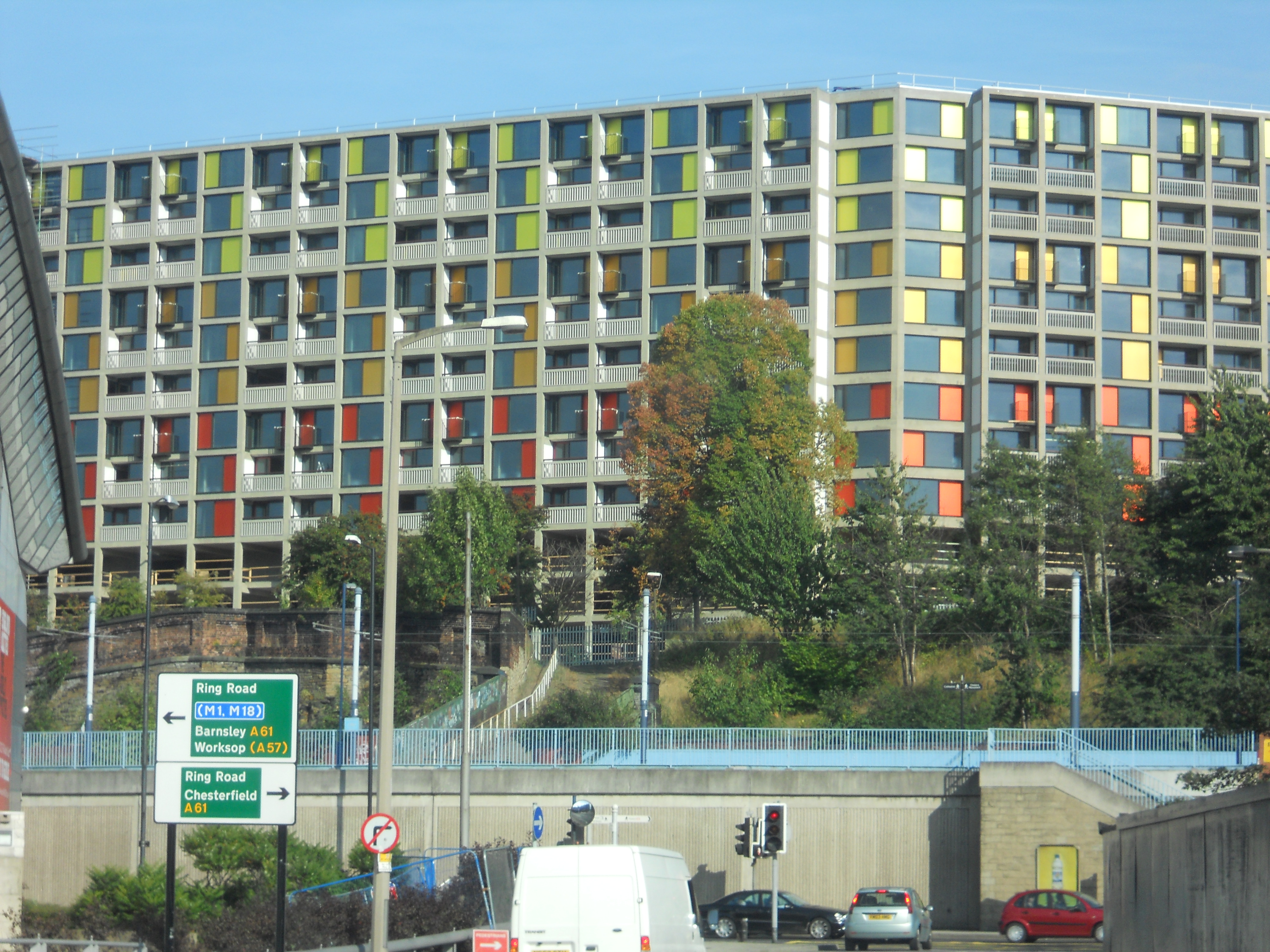
- Proposed action: Phase 1: Strip to H frame and rebuild, Phases 2–5: Light touch refurbishment
- Units: Phase 1: 260 flats, nursery school, commercial units, Phase 2: 195 flats and townhouses, commercial units, Phase 3: 356 student rooms, Phase 4: 125 flats and townhouses, 2 commercial units, Phase 5: 105 flats and townhouses, 1 commercial unit
- Refurbished: 2006–present
- Architect: Studio Egret West, Hawkins Brown and Grant Associates, Mikhail Riches, Whitham Cox, Carmody Groarke
- Contractor: Urban Splash, Alumno Group
- Directing authority: Sheffield City Council

Listing

Listed Building – Grade II*
- Designated: 1998
- Reference no.: 1246881

Park Hill is a housing estate in Sheffield, South Yorkshire, England. It was built between 1957 and 1961, and in 1998 was given Grade II* listed building status. Following a period of decline, the estate is being renovated by developers Urban Splash into a mostly private mixed-tenure estate made up of homes for market rent, private sale, shared ownership, and student housing while around a quarter of the units in the development will be social housing. The renovation was shortlisted for both the 2013 and 2024 RIBA Stirling Prize, for the first and second phases of the redevelopment respectively. The Estate falls within the Manor Castle ward of the City. Park Hill is also the name of the area in which the flats are sited. The name relates to the deer park attached to Sheffield Manor Lodge, the remnant of which is now known as Norfolk Park.

== History ==
Park Hill was previously the site of back-to-back housing, a mixture of 2–3-storey tenement buildings, open ground, quarries and steep gennels (alleyways) connecting the homes. The streets were arranged in a gridiron with terraces of back-to-back housing; a row facing the street, backed with a row facing inwards to a court-yard. There were shared privies unconnected to mains drainage. One standpipe supported up to 100 people. It was colloquially known as "Little Chicago" in the 1930s, due to the incidence of violent crime there. Clearance of the area began during the 1930s. The first clearance was made for the Duke/Bard/Bernard Street scheme in 1933. The courts were replaced with four-storey blocks of maisonettes. In 1935 it was proposed to clear the central area which included streets to the south of Duke Street; South Street, Low Street, Hague Lane, Lord Street, Stafford Street, Long Henry Street, Colliers Row, Norwich Street, Gilbert Street and Anson Street. John Rennie, the city's Medical Officer of Health, concluded:

the dwelling houses in that area [of Duke Street, Duke Street Lane, South Street and Low Street] are by reason of disrepair or sanitary defects unfit for human habitation, or are by reason of their bad arrangement, or the narrowness or bad arrangement of the streets, dangerous or injurious to the health of the inhabitants of the area, and that the other buildings in the area are for a like reason dangerous or injurious to the health of the said inhabitants, and that the most satisfactory method of dealing with the conditions in the area is the demolition of all the buildings in the area.

G. C. Craven, the city's planning officer, recommended wholesale demolition and possible replacement with multi-storey flats. The Second World War halted this.

Following the war it was decided that a radical scheme needed to be introduced to deal with rehousing the Park Hill community. To that end, architects Jack Lynn and Ivor Smith under the supervision of J. L. Womersley, Sheffield Council's City Architect, began work in 1953 designing the Park Hill Flats. Inspired by Le Corbusier's Unité d'Habitation and the Smithsons' unbuilt schemes, most notably for Golden Lane in London, the deck access design was viewed as 'revolutionary'; in reality the fantastical schemes were often less practical for the families actually living in them. The style is known as brutalism.

=== Construction ===
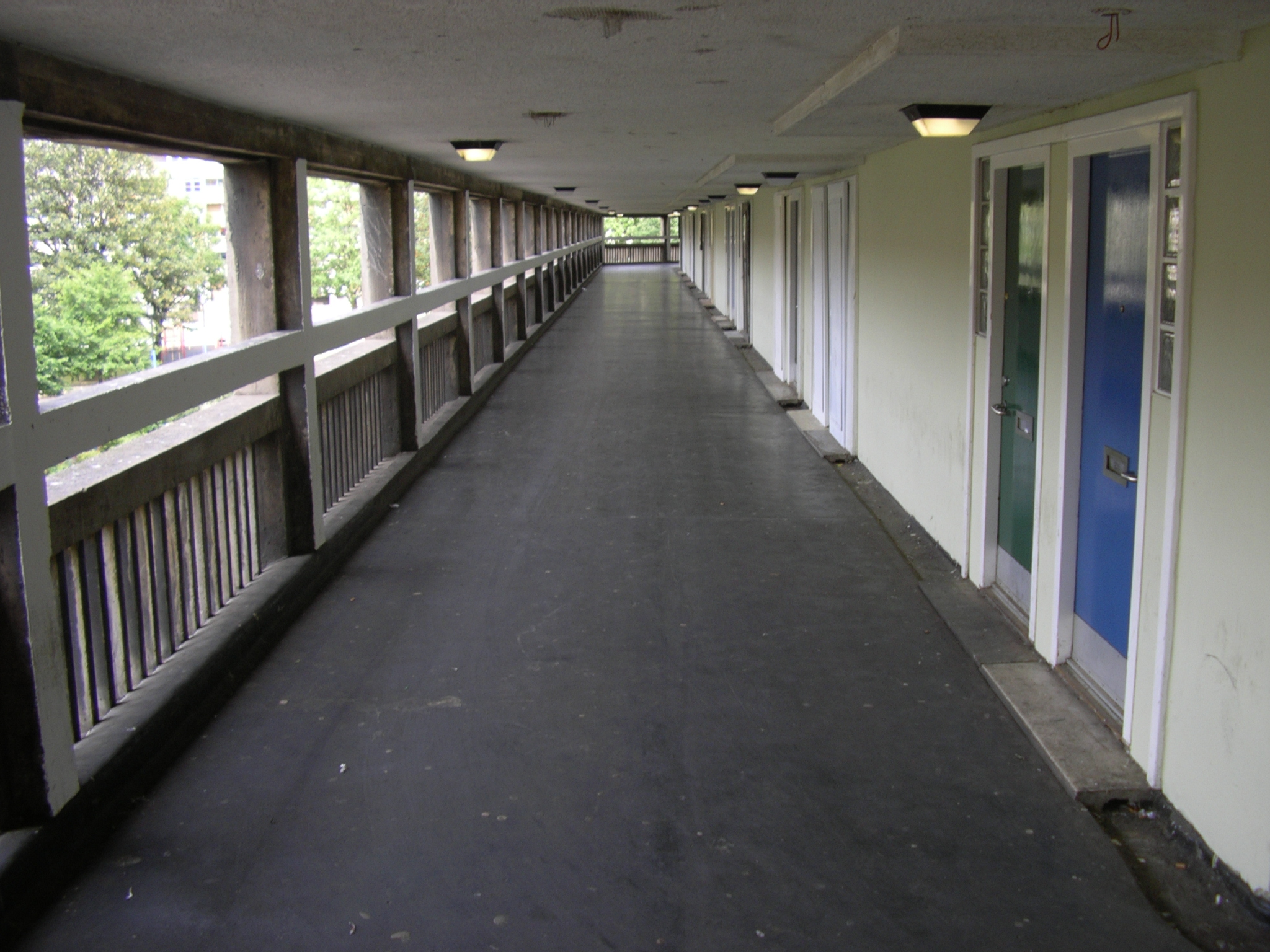
A typical deck at Park Hill

Construction began in 1957. Park Hill (Part One) was officially opened by Hugh Gaitskell, MP and Leader of the Opposition, on 16 June 1961. The City Council published a brochure on the scheme which was in several languages, including Russian.

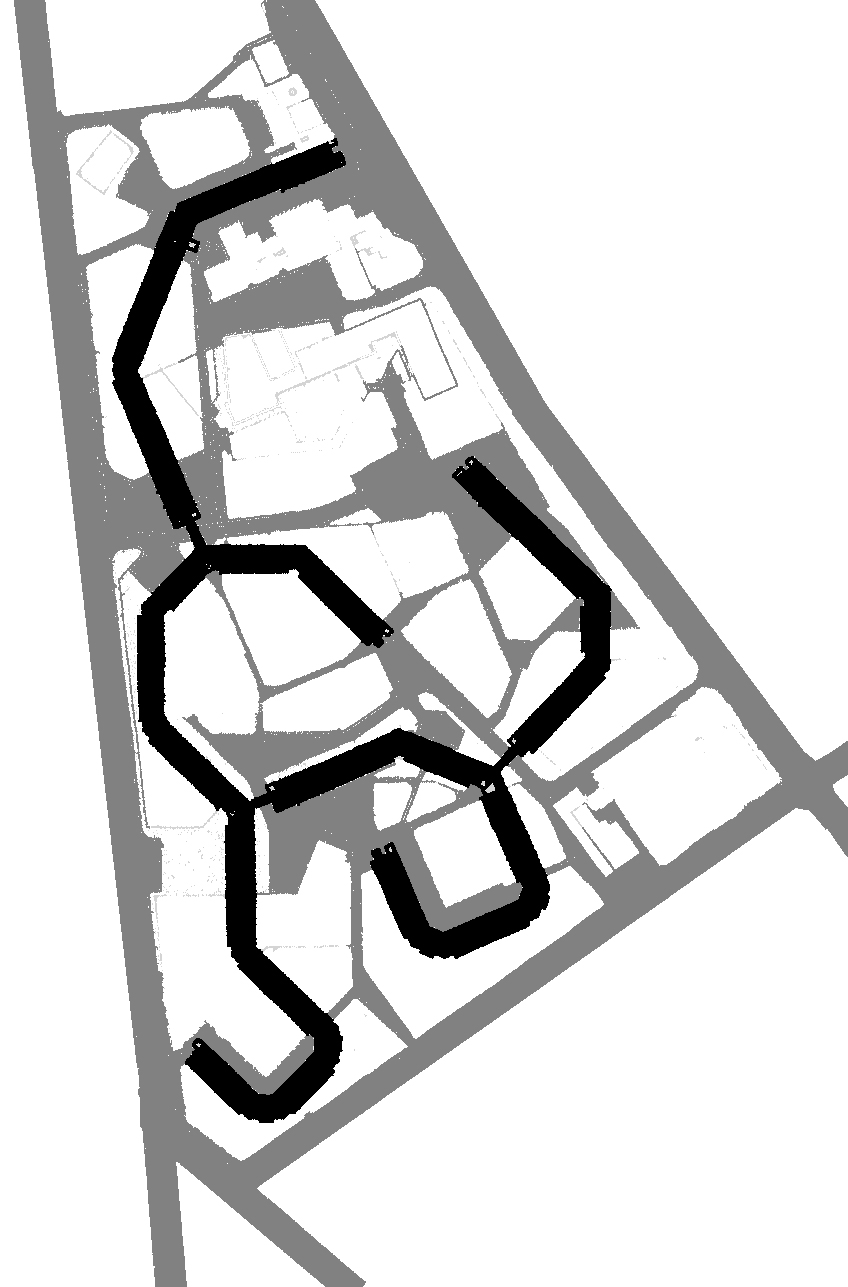
The footprint of the four blocks, with the paths and low-lying structures beneath

To maintain a strong sense of community, neighbours were re-homed next door to each other and old street names from the area were re-used (e.g. Gilbert Row, Long Henry Row). Cobbles from the terraced streets surrounded the flats and paved the pathways down the hill to Sheffield station and tramlines.

The second phase consisted of four high rise blocks, containing 1,160 dwellings, on the hill behind, joined to the main scheme by two three-storey terraces to the east of Bernard Street that contained 153 dwellings. This was renamed in May 1961, becoming the Hyde Park flats. The terraces became Hyde Park Walk and Hyde Park Terrace. The Hyde Park tower blocks were between five and 19 storeys high. This was opened on 23 June 1966 by Queen Elizabeth the Queen Mother.

Further housing schemes were completed to similar designs, including the Broomhall and Kelvin developments in Sheffield. At first these 'Streets in the sky' enjoyed some popularity and success; for the first time in their lives, the working-poor tenants had the luxury of private bathrooms and efficient heating, but problems soon began to surface; Parents felt unable to keep an eye on their children in the playgrounds so many floors below, some older people felt isolated – if the access lifts were out of order it meant many stairs to climb, and even when they were working, lifts could be unpleasant due to being used as "toilets" especially at weekends, requiring a caretaker to swill them with strong smelling disinfectant. Secluded walkways and stairwells provided opportunity for crime and anti-social behaviour while high balconies invited some to throw refuse and other more dangerous items over them; in the late 1970s a child was killed by a TV set thrown from Hyde Park flats. The high platforms also attracted suicidal jumpers. Government restrictions on how potential tenants were allocated to flats, the decay of the building's fabric when not maintained, poor noise insulation and issues with resident security caused their popularity to wane. For many years, the council found it difficult to find tenants for the flats.

=== Listing and renovation ===
Park Hill renovation

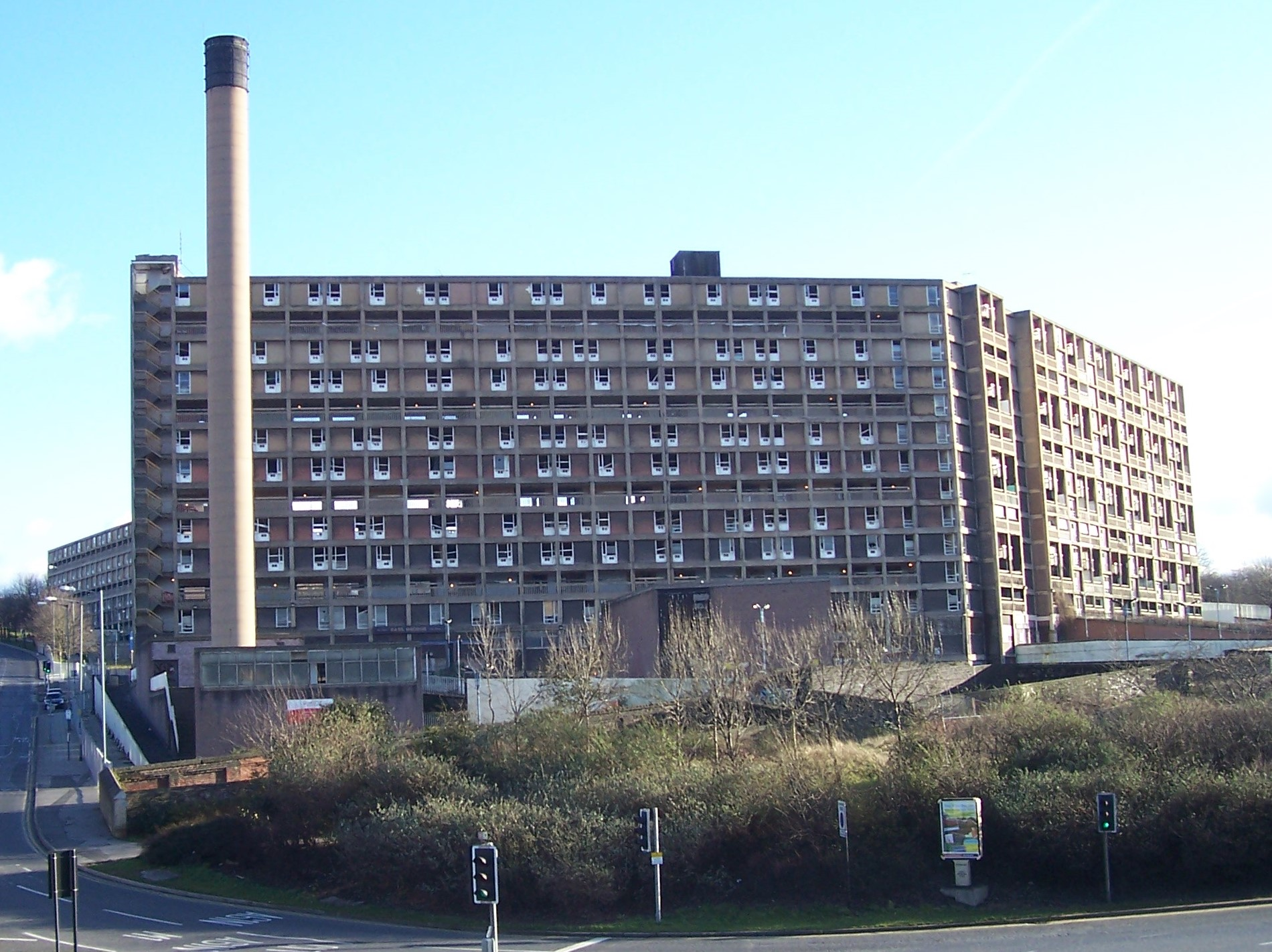
Park Hill in 2008

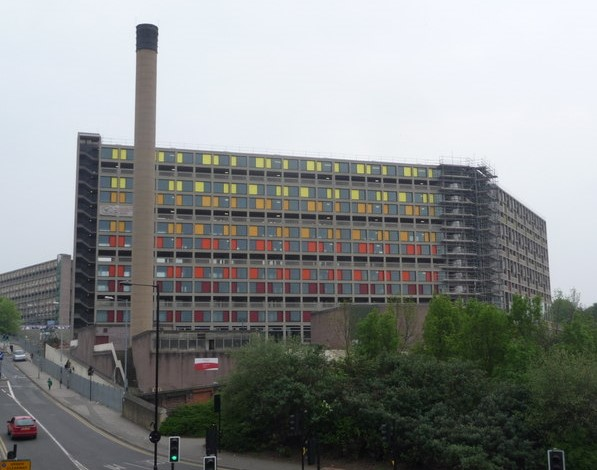
Park Hill in 2011

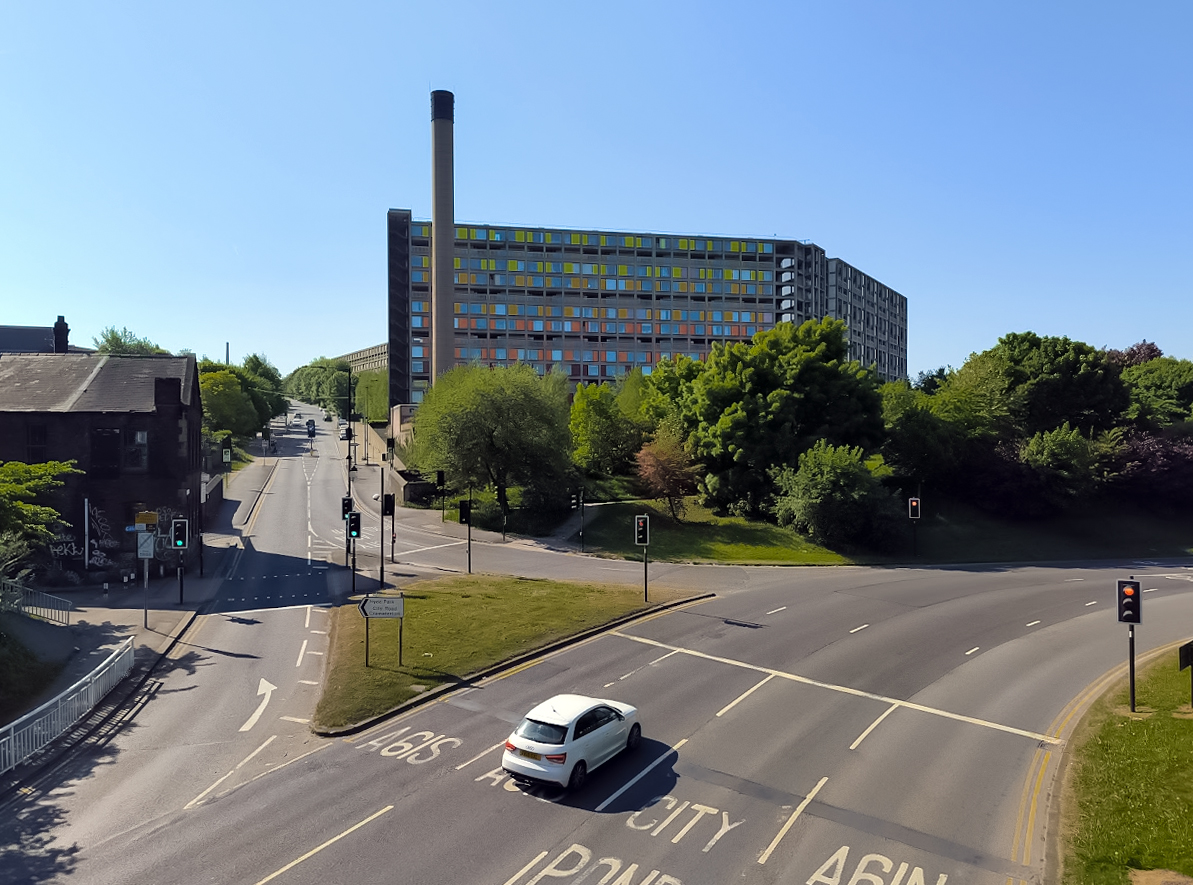
Park Hill and Duke Street in 2025

Despite the problems, the complex remained structurally sound, unlike many system-built blocks of the era, and controversially was Grade II* listed in 1998 making it the largest listed building in Europe. Sheffield City Council hoped this would attract investment to renovate the building, but this was not initially forthcoming. The decision to list the estate was controversial at the time and it continues to attract criticism. A part-privatisation scheme by the developer Urban Splash in partnership with English Heritage to turn the flats into upmarket apartments, business units and social housing is now underway.

Sheffield City Council have created a new public park, South Street Open Space, between the railway station and Park Hill. This includes a series of seating terraces and new planting areas.

==== Phase 1 ====
Flanks A, B and C (the tallest sections of the buildings) were initially cleared, leaving only their concrete shell. The renovation was one of the six shortlisted projects for the 2013 RIBA Stirling Prize. The renovation was due to start in around 2007 but was put on hold due to the recession. Work started in 2009 with the first phase open to residents in 2010/11.

==== Phase 2 ====
In comparison to the boldness of the Phase 1 renovation, Phase 2 instead implemented a "light touch" approach which retains the original brick infill and full width of the streets. 195 new flats and townhouses will be developed in flanks D, E, F, G and H around a central residents garden as well as 27,000 square feet (2,500 m^{2}) of commercial space. This phase also included the restoration of the link bridge to Phase 1.

Planning approval was granted in December 2017 and work began on site in January 2019. Homes went on sale in February 2020 and residents moved in from January 2022.

A pub opened in September 2023, the first pub at Park Hill since the original development. Its name, The Pearl, is an amalgamation of the names of 2 of those earlier establishments – The Parkway Tavern and The Earl George.

Phase 2 of the Park Hill redevelopment was shortlisted for the 2024 RIBA Stirling Prize.

==== Phase 3 ====
Phase 3 has been developed as student accommodation, consisting of 356 rooms in 74 townhouse style units as well as communal spaces and a convenience shop. Flanks M, N, O, P and Q were developed as part of this phase which has been named Béton House.

Planning approval was granted in July 2018 and work began on site in May 2019. Work completed in autumn 2020 with the first students moving in during September 2020.

The convenience store, Park Hill Provisions, opened in October 2021.

==== Phase 4 ====
Planning approval was granted in August 2019 for the redevelopment of flanks R, S and T into 95 residential units, artist accommodation, heritage flats, artist studios, and contemporary art gallery. An updated planning application was submitted in June 2023 in which the art gallery (and associated studios and accommodation) were removed due to a lack of funding. It also included controversial plans to replace some of the existing green space with car parks. A further amended planning application was approved in November 2023. Construction work began in January 2026, commencing an expected build programme of 106 weeks.

==== Phase 5 ====
A planning application for the fifth and final phase of the redevelopment was submitted in June 2024. Plans for flanks I, J, K and L included 105 residential units, a flexible commercial space and a residents allotment. Planning approval was granted in September 2024.

== Description ==
=== Background ===
The Park Hill area of Sheffield contained and had a population density in the range of 100 to 400 per acre (250 to 990/ha). It was identified as a slum where, according to Patrick Abercrombie's Sheffield Civic Survey and Development Plan (1924), there were death rates in the lower Park district of 20–26 per 1,000 inhabitants, and infant (under one year) mortality rate of 153–179 per 1,000 births. The central area amounted to 710 acres (290 ha), and contained 140 designated clearance areas.

=== Design ===
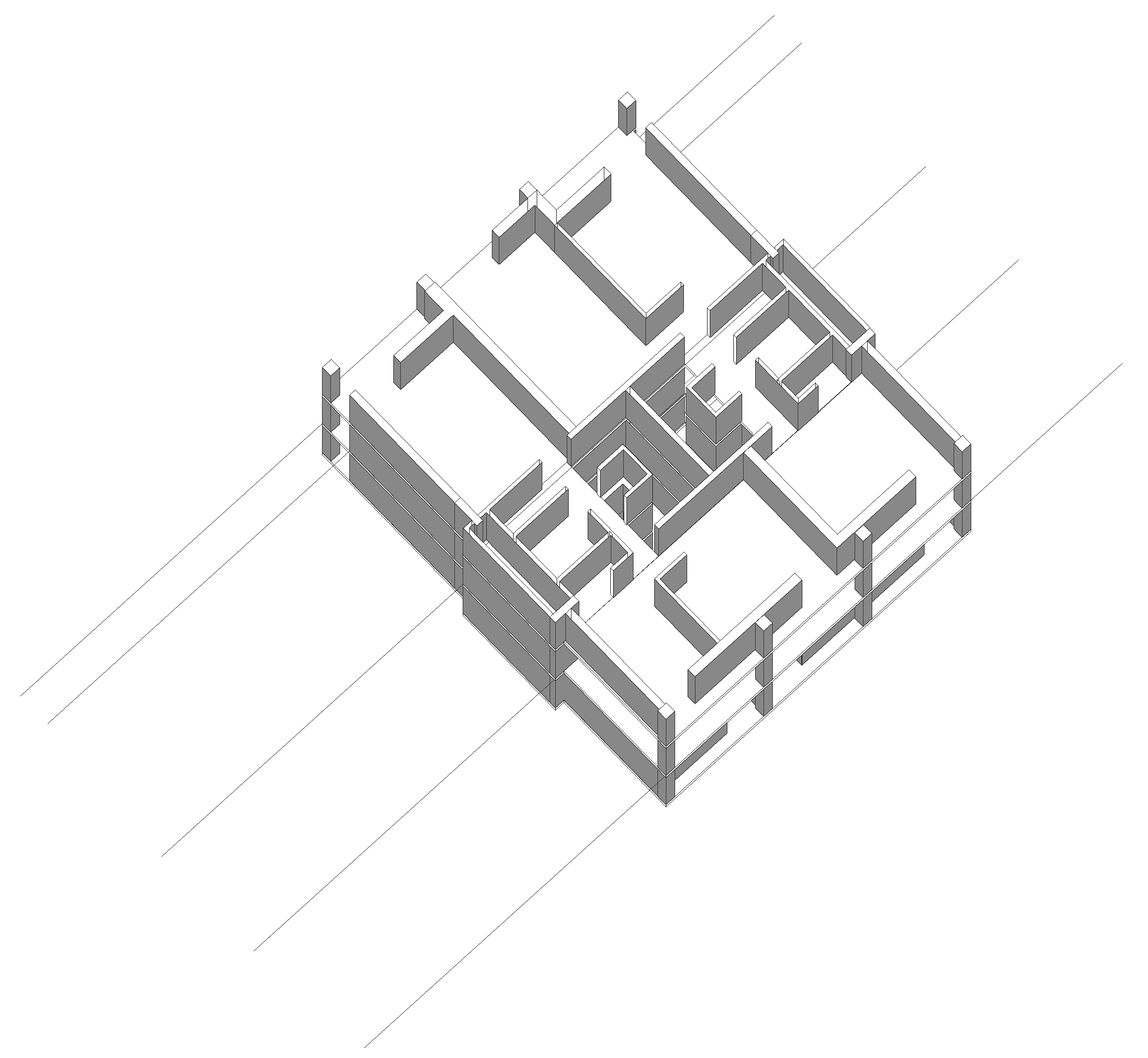
Basic three-level, three-bay module

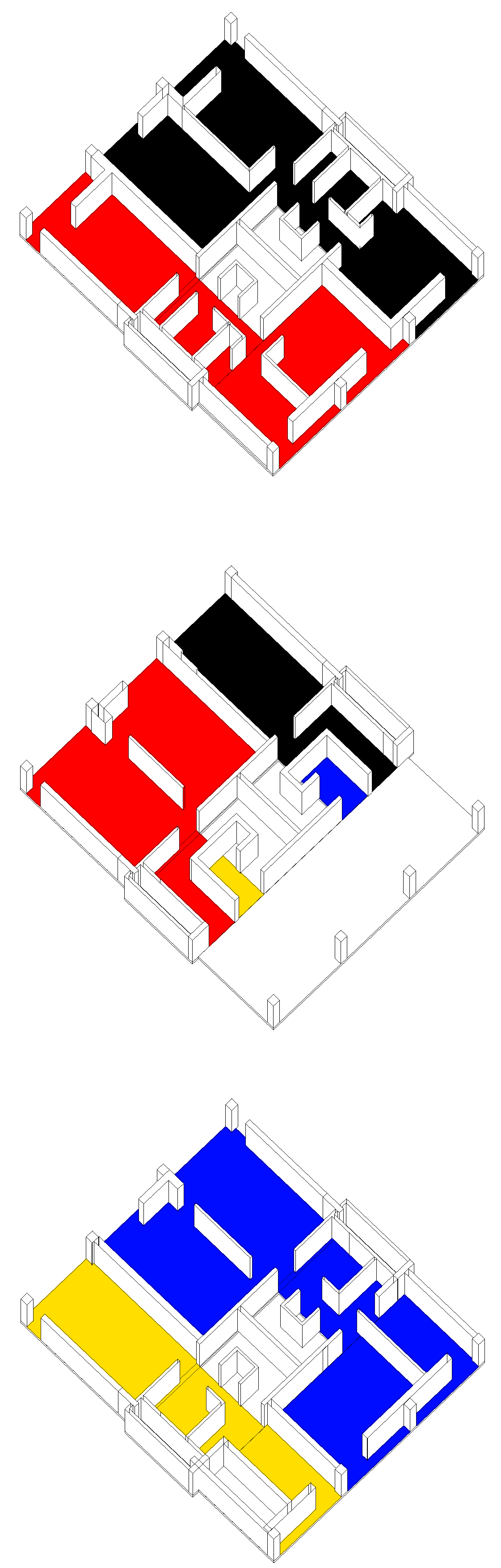
The horizontal design repeated itself every three bays: each of these units contained a one bedroom flat (yellow), a two bedroom flat (blue), a two bedroom maisonette (black) and a three bedroom maisonette (red). The levels are connected by the H-frame containing the stair columns.

The 995 Park Hill flats and maisonettes, three pubs and 31 shops were built in four ranges linked by bridges across the upper decks. The ranges were canted at obtuse angles to maximise the panoramic views across the city and the southern Pennines. The stair columns and lifts were placed at each turn. There were two service lifts capable of elevating maintenance vehicles.

The site is steeply sloping (gradient 1 in 10), enabling the designers to maintain a constant roof level though the buildings ranged from four to 13 storeys. There were access roadways 10 feet (3.0 m) on every third storey; these serviced a one-storey flat beneath and a two-storey maisonette on that level and on the level above. The horizontal design repeated itself every three bays, centred on a H-frame that carried the services and stair columns. Each of these units contained a one-bedroom flat, a two-bedroom flat, a two-bedroom maisonette and a three-bedroom maisonette, and stair columns. The kitchens and bathrooms were vertically aligned, allowing simple ducting for services and the Garchey waste disposal system.

Construction is of an exposed concrete frame with a progression of purple, terracotta, light red and cream brick curtain walling. However, as a result of weathering and soot-staining from passing trains, few people realise this and assume the building to be constructed entirely from concrete.

The concept of the flats was described as streets in the sky. There were four street decks, wide enough for milk floats, with large numbers of front doors opening onto them. This was a key concept of the design. Each deck of the structure, except the top one, has direct access to ground level at some point on the sloping site.

The shopping facilities, known as The Pavement, were provided on the lowest part of the site. There were four pubs: The Earl George on The Pavement, The Link and the Scottish Queen on Gilbert Row, and the Parkway on Hague Row.

== Location ==
Park Hill is one of the seven hills on which Sheffield is built. It is south of the River Don, and to the east of the River Sheaf. The estate is on steeply rising land the lower slopes, it is upwind of the former heavily polluting industrial areas of the Don Valley. The estate is bounded by Park Square roundabout on the A61, the B6070 Duke Street, B6071 Talbot Street and South Street.

Immediately to the west is Sheffield station that in 2010–11, was the 35th-busiest in the UK, and the 11th-busiest outside London. Also serving the wider Park Hill development, the South Yorkshire Supertram stop at Sheffield station opened in 1994, served by the Blue and Purple routes.

== Arts ==
A piece of graffiti, "Clare Middleton I love you will u marry me", written on one of the "bridges" linking two of the blocks, was the subject of a documentary broadcast on BBC Radio 4 in 2011. Jason Lowe spray-painted the graffiti proposal in 2001; Middleton did not marry him, and died of cancer in 2007. The graffiti was mentioned by Yungblud in his song "I Love You, Will You Marry Me", and Alex Turner of the Arctic Monkeys wore a T-shirt with a reproduction of the "I love you will u marry me" at a gig. As part of the renovation, Urban Splash overlaid that part of the graffiti in neon in 2008, but in early 2021 removed it while renovating the bridge.

Even now, inhabitants of Sheffield are split on the matter of Park Hill; many believe it to be a part of Sheffield's heritage, while others consider it an eyesore and blot on the landscape. Public nominations led it to the top 12 of Channel 4's Demolition programme. Other television appearances for the flats include Police 2020 and in an Arctic Monkeys video. A BBC programme called Saving Britain's Past sheds light on the building site's past and discusses the listing from several viewpoints in its second episode, called "Streets in the Sky". The 2014 film '71 used the buildings to recreate Belfast's notorious Divis Flats during The Troubles.

Park Hill has featured as a major source of inspiration for British artist Mandy Payne, with her paintings of the estate winning several awards.

Park Hill is referenced in the lyrics of Pulp's song "Sheffield Sex City".

Park Hill appears on the cover of Eagulls' self-titled debut album.

The building was used as the location for Harvey and Gadget's flat in This Is England '90 and also features in This Is England '86 during the fight scene.

The area and above-mentioned graffiti are the subject of the song "I Love You, Will You Marry Me" by South Yorkshire-born musician Yungblud.

Park Hill is featured in the eleventh series and twelfth series of Doctor Who, as the family home of companion Yaz Khan.

The musical Standing at the Sky's Edge, featuring songs by Richard Hawley, is set in Park Hill and tells the story of three families over sixty years beginning in 1961. The musical premiered at the Crucible Theatre, Sheffield in 2019 and transferred to the National Theatre in London in 2023. That same year, it won Best New Musical at the Laurence Olivier Awards. After the run at the National Theatre, it was announced that the musical would open in the West End in February 2024 at the Gillian Lynne Theatre.

Park Hill is featured in the 2017 science fiction romantic comedy film How to Talk to Girls at Parties, based on the short story of the same name by Neil Gaiman. Park Hill serves as the setting for a part of the main character's love story, as well as the climax of the film.

In July 2022, Park Hill was used as a filming location for The Full Monty TV series.

Scenes for the TV series Bodies were filmed at Park Hill during September 2022.

== Photo gallery ==
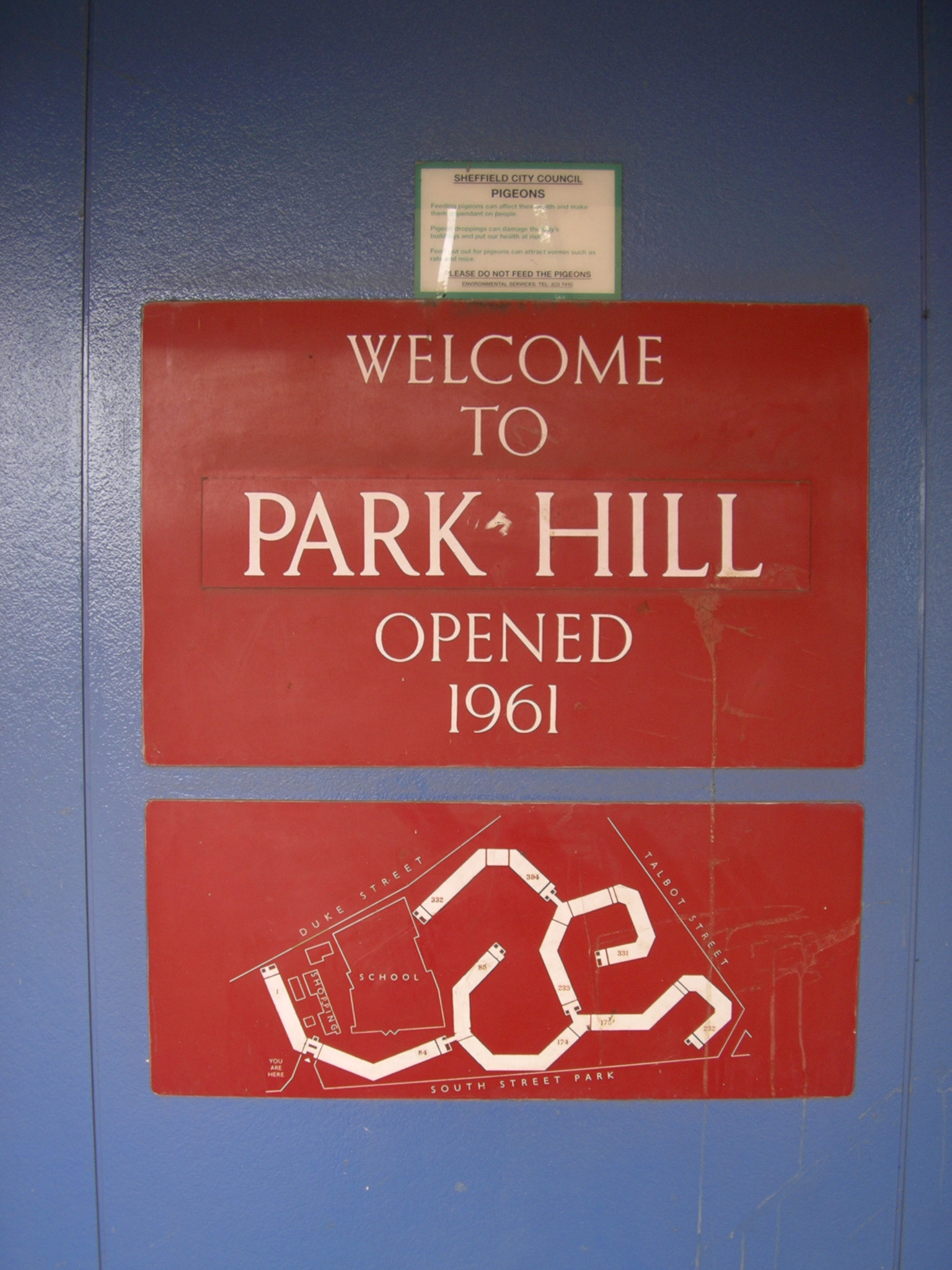
Welcome sign and plan at the main entrance.

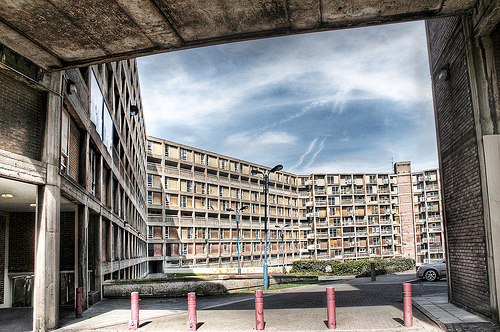
Entrance of Park Hill

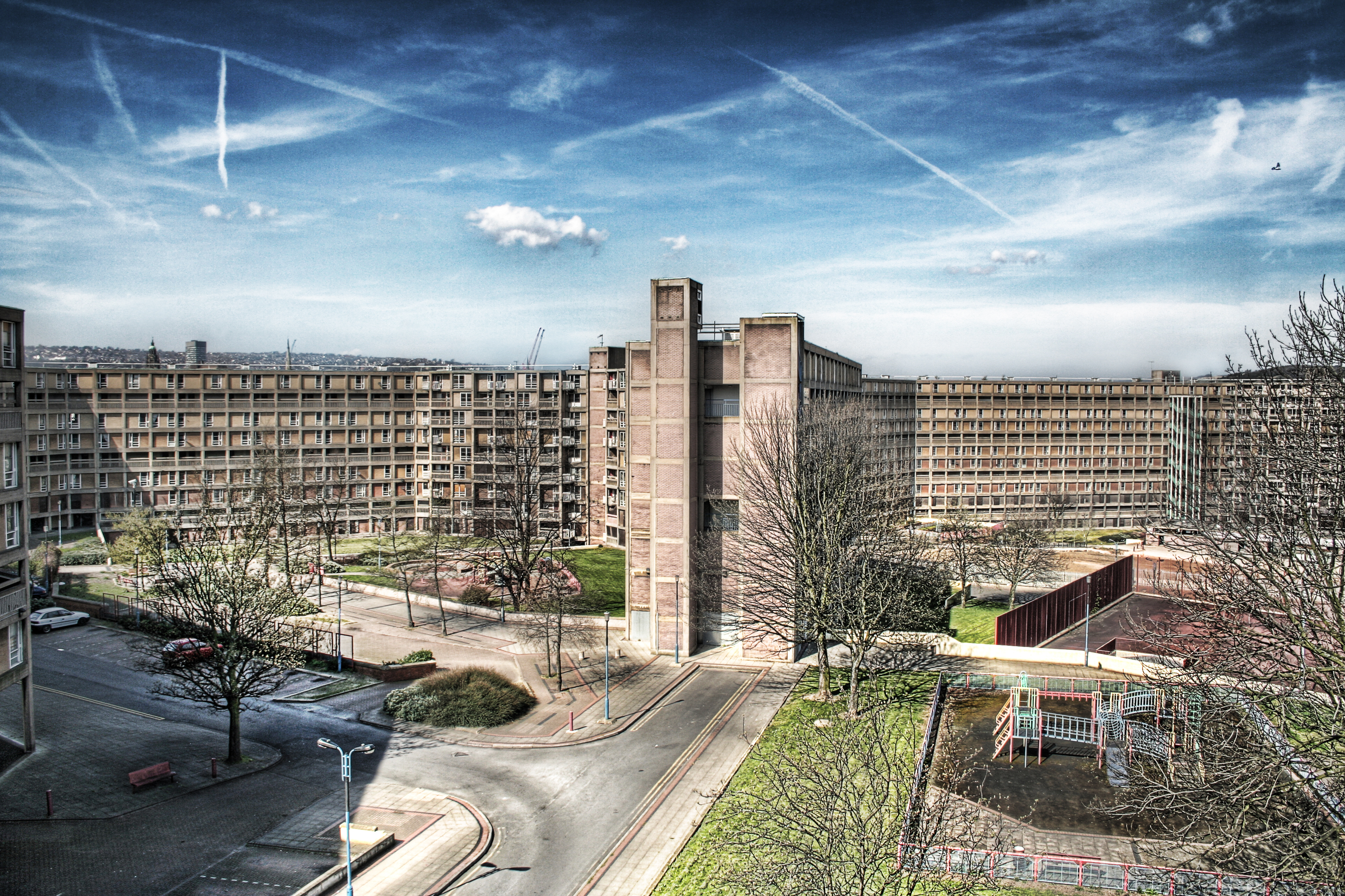
Panorama of Park Hill

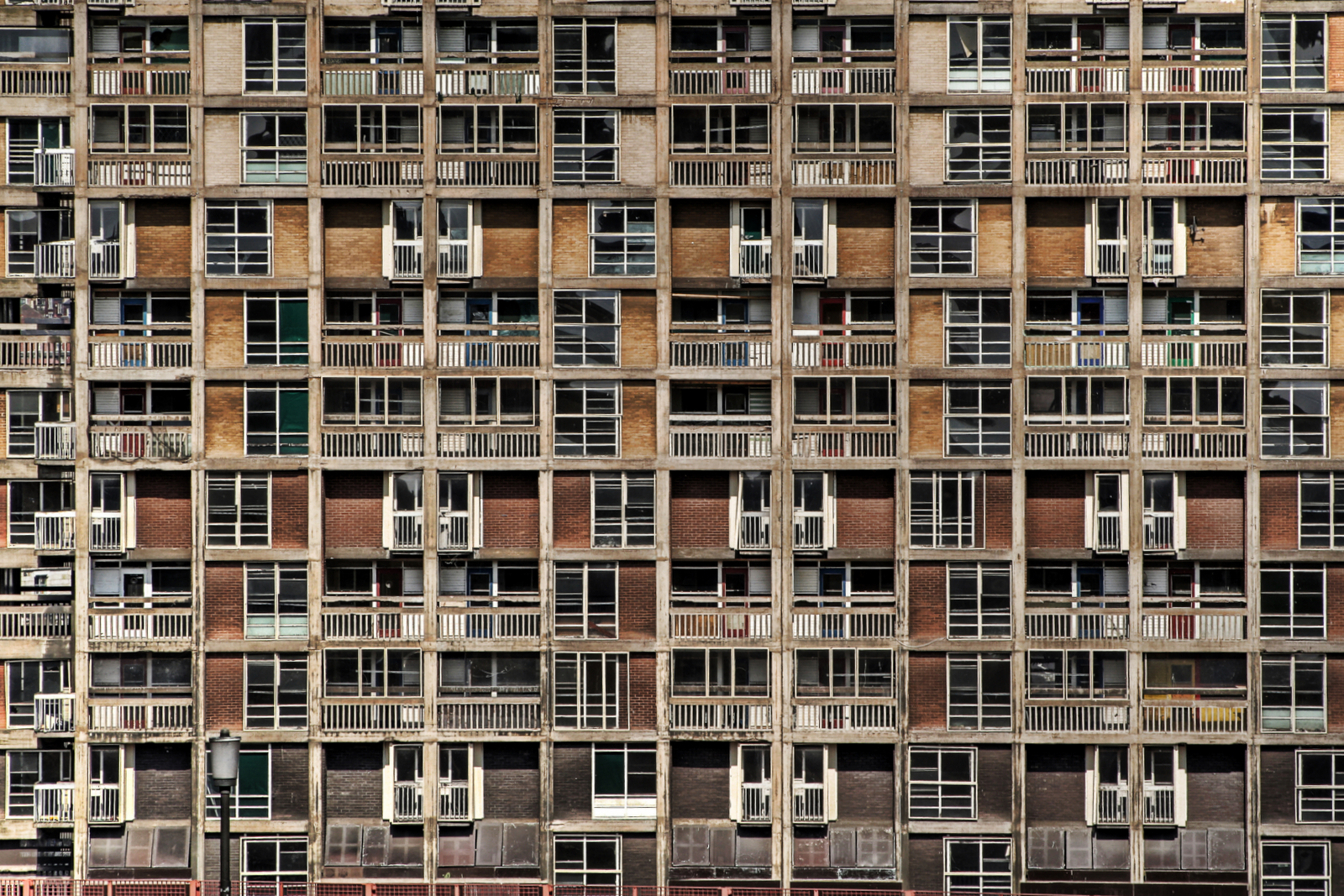
One of the Park Hill facades

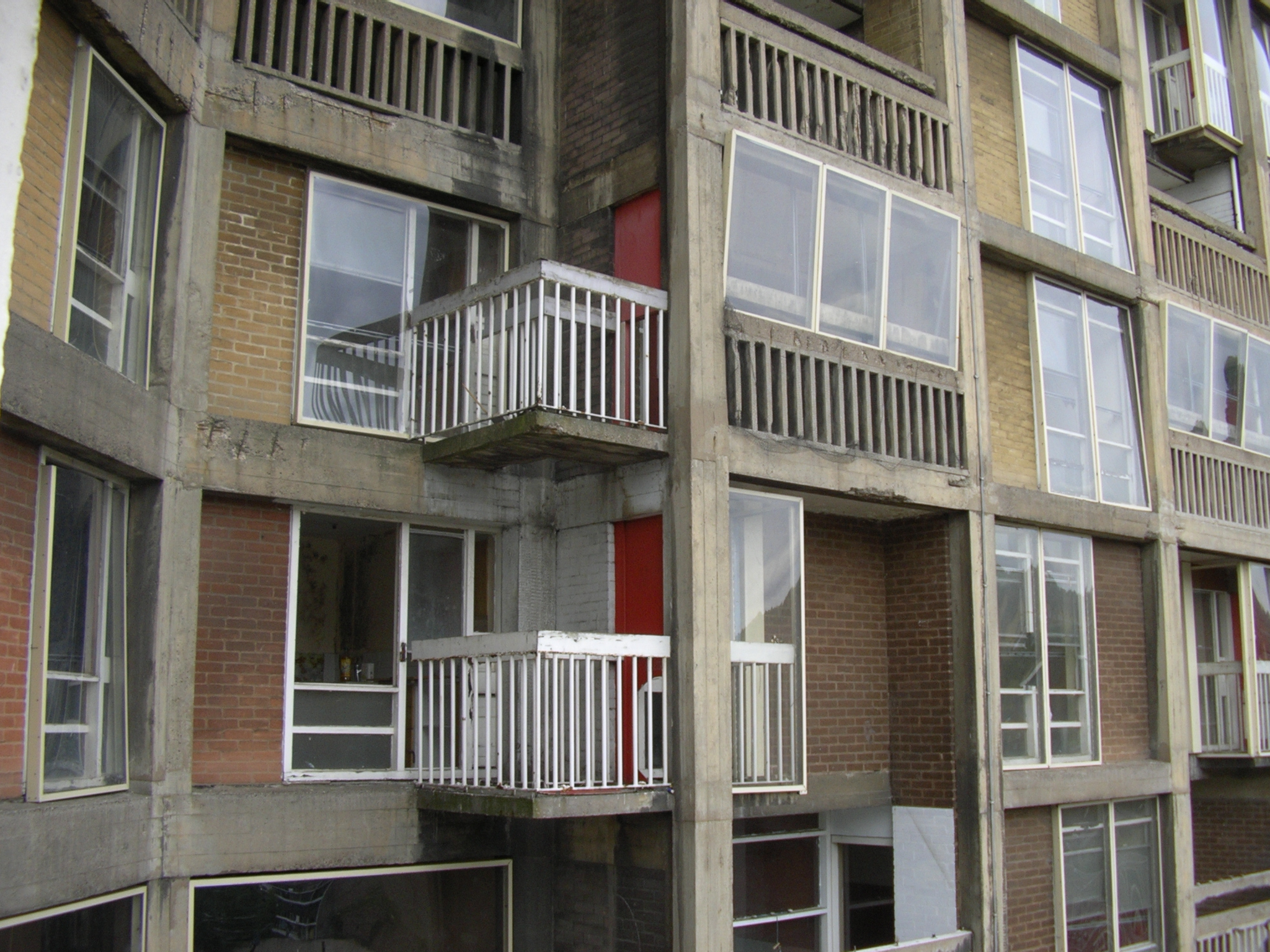
Close-up of the exterior

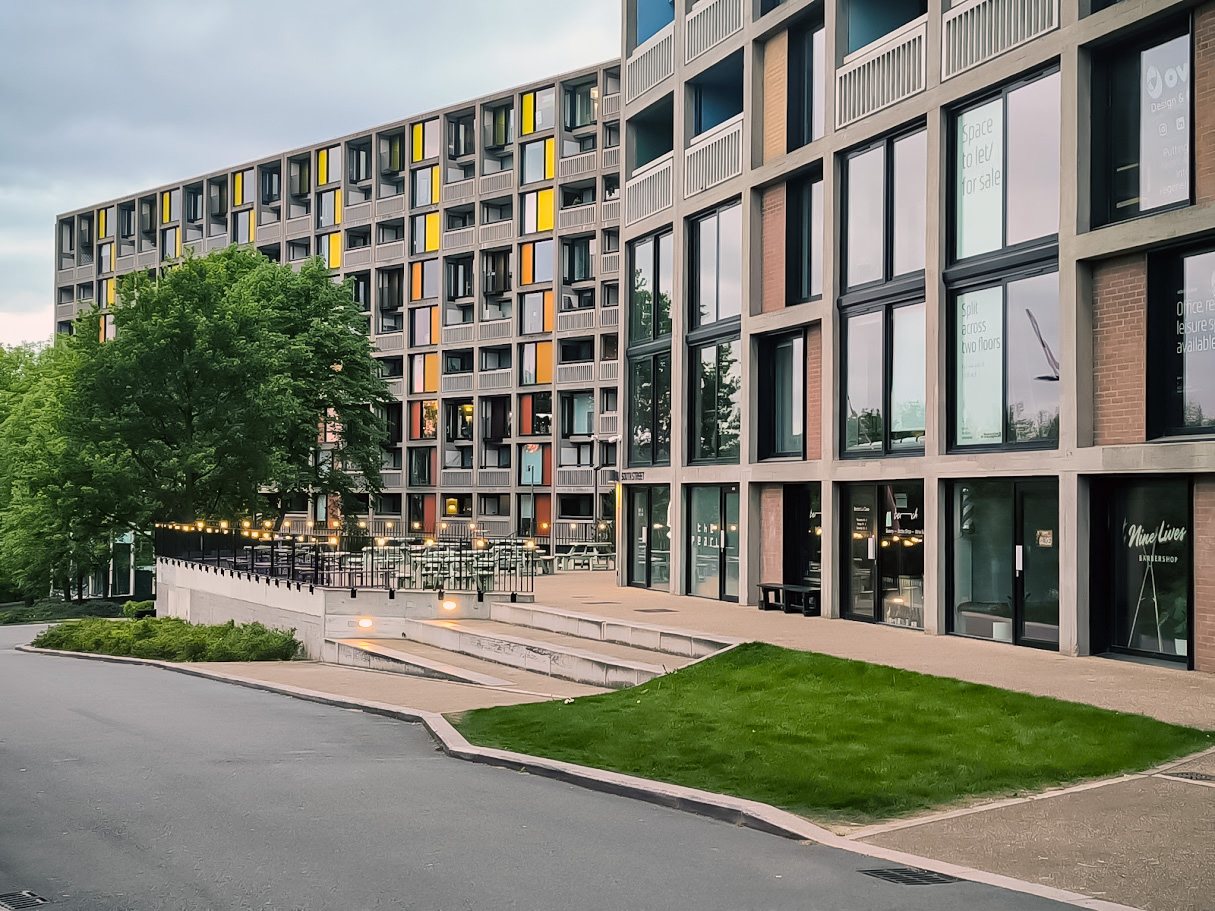
Cocktail Bar & Stores in Park Hill, along South Street

== See also ==
- List of brutalist apartment blocks in Sheffield
- List of Brutalist structures
- Cables Wynd House, Edinburgh, Scotland
- Byker Wall, Newcastle upon Tyne, England
- Prora, Rügen, Germany
- Falowiec, Gdansk, Poland
- Karl-Marx-Hof, Vienna, Austria
- Spinaceto, Rome, Italy
- Ballymun Flats, Dublin, Ireland
- Golden Lane Estate competition entry by Alison and Peter Smithson, London
- Robin Hood Gardens, London
- Habitat 67, Canada
- Hunslet Grange Flats, Leeds
