= Ivor Smith (architect) =

English architect

Ivor Stanley Smith (27 January 1926 – 18 February 2018) was an English architect, responsible in part for Park Hill in Sheffield under the auspices of J. Lewis Womersley.

He was a committed pacifist, and as a conscientious objector in the Second World War, he did farm work at Piggotts, the community in the Chilterns created by the sculptor Eric Gill.

In the 1970s he was partnered with Cailey Hutton. Together they were responsible for developments such as Morant House, which is a modern-for-its-time building for social housing. He spent a period of time in the 1970s visiting the School of architecture at University College Dublin, Richview, which was in need of being brought into the Modern era.

Written works include Architecture an Inspiration in paperback, published in 2014.

National Life Stories conducted an oral history interview (C467/129) with Ivor Smith in 2016 for its Architects Lives' collection held by the British Library.
