= Buildings and structures in Sheffield =

Buildings and structures in English city

Buildings and structures in Sheffield have been constructed over a time-span ranging from the 13th century to the present day. The majority of Sheffield's older buildings were built during the Industrial Revolution, with many medieval buildings demolished in the 19th century; some older buildings were lost during the Sheffield Blitz. Sheffield can only lay claim to five Grade I listed buildings, two of which are in the city centre.

The oldest structure is Beauchief Abbey, which dates back to the 12th century and is now still a functioning Abbey, open every Sunday with evensong once a month. Within the grounds, there are also signs of the old ruin of when the Abbey was once much bigger. The oldest complete structure is Sheffield Cathedral, parts of which date back to the 13th century. In relation to height, the 78-metre (256 ft) Arts Tower was the tallest completed building in Sheffield until the St Pauls tower (City Lofts) project was completed in 2011.

== History ==
=== Pre-19th century ===
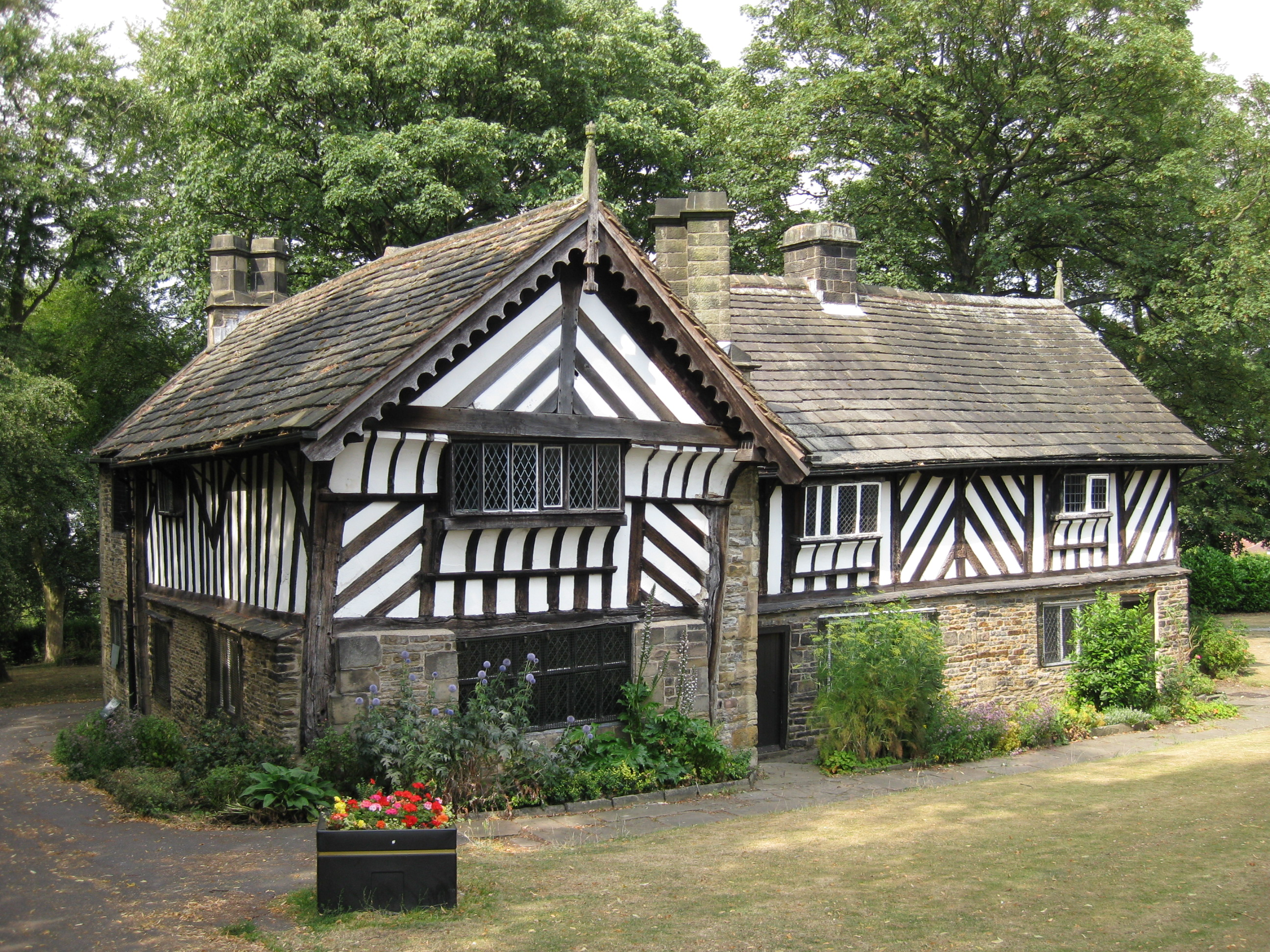
Bishops' House, built c.1500

At the time of the Norman Conquest Sheffield was a small hamlet dominated by a wooden long house occupied by Waltheof, 1st Earl of Northampton, which later became the site of the two castles.

The Domesday Book, which William the Conqueror ordered to be written so that the value of the townships and manors of England could be assessed, mentions :-

LANDS OF ROGER DE BUSLI
In Hallam, one manor with its sixteen hamlets, there are twenty-nine carucates [~14 km^{2}] to be taxed. There Earl Waltheof had an "Aula" [hall or court] ...

Beauchief Abbey was built four miles south-west of what was then a well-established town. In the 12th century a wooden motte-and-bailey castle was built. When this castle was destroyed in 1260, it was replaced with a stone castle, which would stand until the English Civil War.

In November 2005 the University of Sheffield's archaeological consultant, ARCUS, unearthed a Medieval well over three metres deep in the sandstone bedrock beneath Carmel House on Fargate. The Sheffield city centre site was being excavated as part of a redevelopment project. Pottery found in the well suggests that it was in use by 1300 AD, and had been filled in around the time of the English Civil War. The uncovered medieval pots included jugs made in the Hallgate area of neighbouring Doncaster and other items from the Humber Estuary.

This discovery offers significant evidence relating to the medieval town of Sheffield, then still a small market town, before its growth during the subsequent Industrial Revolution. Dating of the well indicates that it was probably dug around the time of the stone reconstruction of Sheffield Castle in 1270 and the granting of Sheffield's Market Charter by Edward I in 1296.

Due to the conditions in the well, animal bones and plant remains (possibly including microscopic pollen grains) have been preserved and will be analysed the University's Department of Archaeology laboratories.

Sheffield's second parish church was built in 1280, replacing the previous 11th-century structure. This was replaced in 1430 with the core of the current structure. Lady's Bridge, the oldest in the city, was built in 1485. The oldest domestic buildings were built in the late 15th century and the turn of the 16th century. Old Queen's Head pub was built in 1475, Broom Hall in 1498, and Bishops' House around 1500.

Sheffield Manor was built in 1510 as an alternative residence for the Earl of Shrewsbury. The manor was to later become famous when Mary, Queen of Scots, was imprisoned there. Sheffield Castle was largely destroyed during the civil war. The manor was largely demolished in 1706.

=== Industrial Revolution ===
Many industrial buildings were built during the 18th and 19th centuries. Abbeydale Industrial Hamlet is now a grade I listed building and is used as a museum. Other museums in buildings from the same period are Kelham Island Museum and Shepherd Wheel.

=== 20th century ===
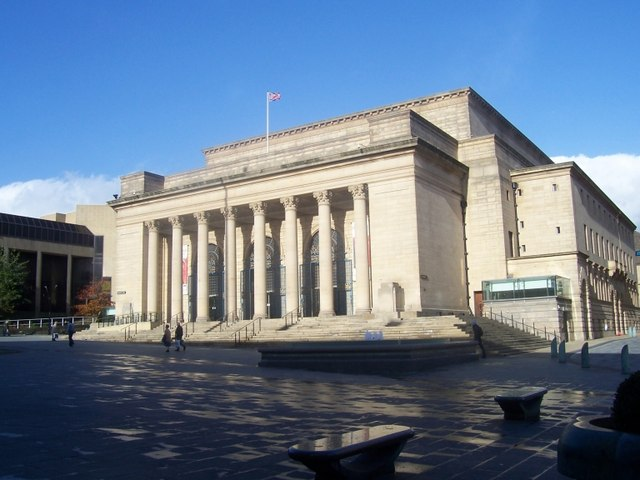
Sheffield City Hall, 1920

Many residential buildings were constructed at the turn of the 20th century, which led to the annexing of large parts of the current city. This was followed by a slump, and by 1917 house building had ceased. Construction of the city hall started in 1920.

The years following the Second World War saw one of the most intense periods of building in the city's history, referred to as the slum clearances. Slum housing was replaced with a number of large tower blocks, many of which have since been demolished and replaced with housing once more.

== Current developments ==
The £130 million Heart of the City scheme is centred on the location of the former town hall extension. It includes a hotel, offices, the Winter Gardens, Millennium Galleries, and Millennium Square. The 101-metre (331 ft) St Paul's Tower (built 2007–2009), is Sheffield's tallest building.

The £50 million Sheffield Station Gateway scheme has seen improvements in station facilities and the creation of a public space outside, with a large sculpture called Cutting Edge. Other improvements leading up to the Peace Gardens will create a pedestrian link to the city centre.

== Future developments ==
The largest scheme due to start is the New Retail Quarter, that was meant to start in 2007. The £600 million scheme will create new retail units and pedestrianise the area between Pinstone Street, Leopold Square, Charter Square, and the Devonshire Quarter. Charter Square will also be pedestrianised. The £315 million West Bar scheme includes new university buildings, a boutique hotel, and residential and commercial developments. Funding was not secured until 2011, by which time the work was originally scheduled to be completed. The project is now underway, renamed as the Sevenstone Project.

== See also ==
- Listed buildings in Sheffield
- List of tallest buildings and structures in Sheffield
