= Riverside Quarter =

Area in Sheffield, England

Coordinates: 53.387°N 1.464°W

The Riverside Quarter, or Riverside Exchange is one of Sheffield's 11 designated City Centre Quarters. Its borders are West Bar, Coulston Street, Bridge Street, Castlegate, Exchange Place and the Parkway to its south, the Wicker Viaduct, Johnson Street, Spitalfields and Nursery Street to the North, and Corporation Street to the west. It is named after the Whitbread Exchange Brewery, which was formerly located on the site of the current developments, and incorporates the Victoria Quays.

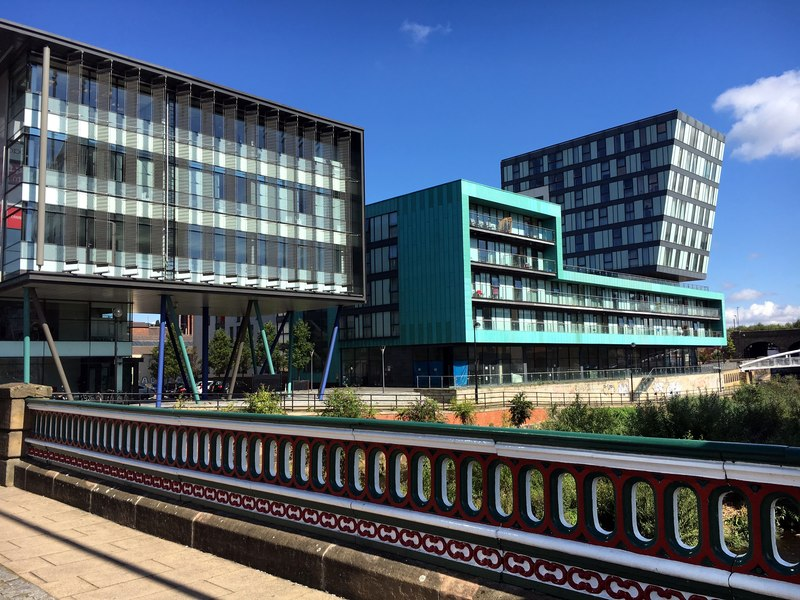
Riverside Developments with the River Don below

== History ==
In the 1760s, one of the earliest integrated steelworks in the world was set up on the site of what is now the Riverside Exchange. A brewery was founded in the area by Tennant Brothers in 1852, and by then there were already four different steelworks there. The brewery grew, however, and took up more and more of the area, and as Sheffield's steel industry plummeted in the mid-20th century and the steelworks were shut down, the brewery was free to expand and it soon took up most of the current area of the Riverside Exchange.

In 1962, the Exchange Brewery was taken over by Whitbread & Co Ltd. However, as the importance of the area decreased due to the closure of the Sheffield Wicker goods station and the loss of tram connections to the area, the brewery shut down in 1993.

In the late 1990s, plans were made by Sheffield's city council to redevelop the Exchange Brewery's area. The area now has more than 300 new apartments, built between 2003 and 2005, and some large office blocks. The area has been made pedestrian-friendly by the construction of the Upper Don Trail, a walkway parallel to Bridge Street along the river Don, and a pedestrian bridge linking the new developments to Nursery Street on the other side of the river.

The development of the Riverside Exchange neighbourhood continues, with planned new developments such as more office space, shops and cafés. There are also schemes for Nursery Street to be pedestrianised. The final northern section of Sheffield's Inner Relief Road, finished in 2008, shifts traffic away from Bridge Street and further increases the neighbourhood's desirability.

Another development, the West Bar scheme is to be based in the quarter. This is planned to extend the city centre's retail offering, and will also contribute new apartments and office space, and is based around the Sheffield Law Courts.
