= Pound's Park =

Park in Sheffield, England

Coordinates: 53.3789°N 1.4739°W

Pound's Park is an urban pocket park and public space in the city centre of Sheffield, England. It is located between Wellington Street, Carver Street and Rockingham Street and is part of the Heart of the City II regeneration project. It stands on the site of the former Wellington Street fire station which was demolished in 2010 when South Yorkshire Fire and Rescue services moved to a new site on Eyre Street. The park is named after Sheffield's first Chief Fire Officer John Charles Pound.

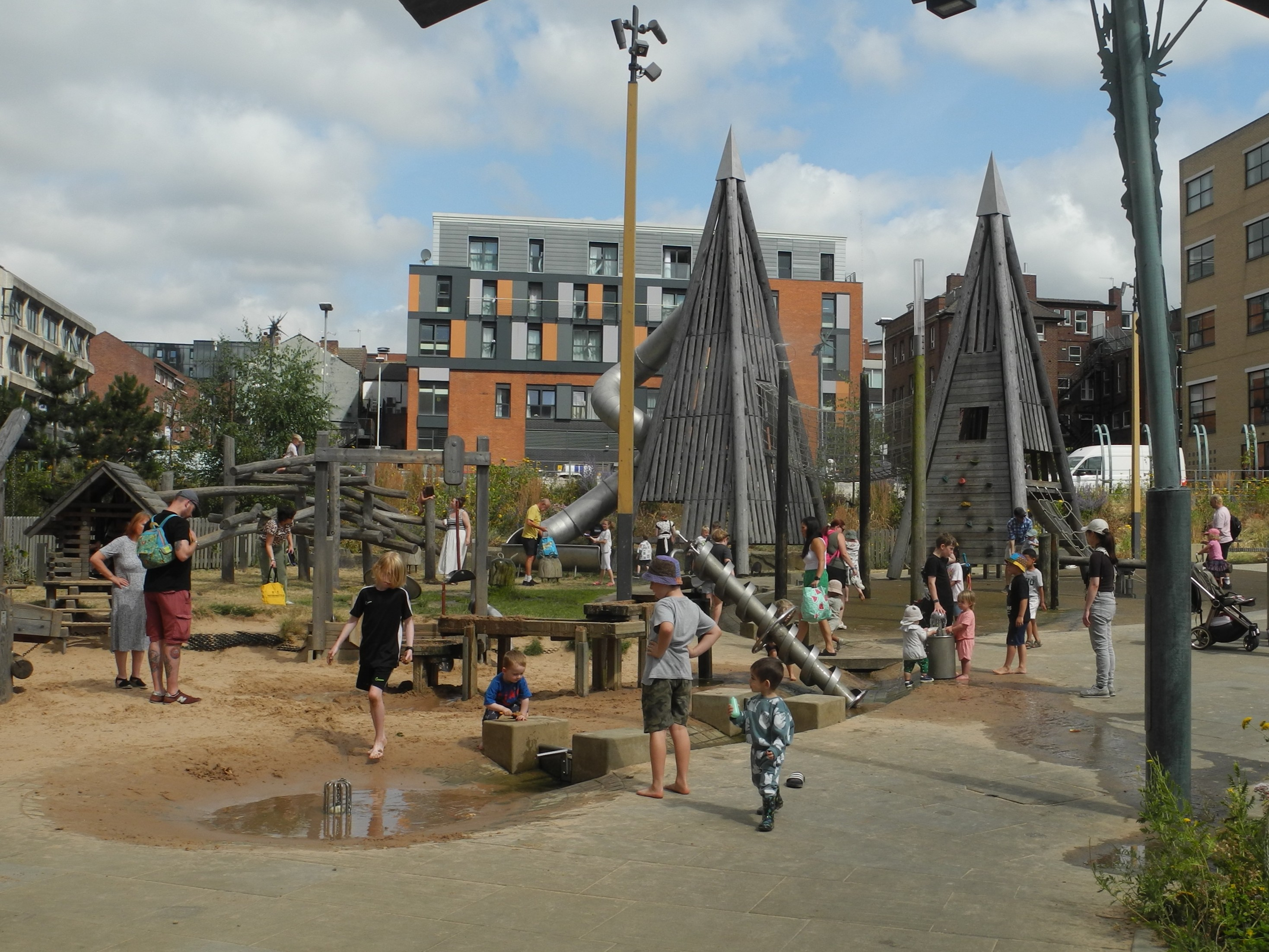
The children's play area.

== Planning and Construction ==
The demolition of the fire station was a contentious issue with green campaigners and some locals wanting the building to be saved and a new use found. However Sheffield City Council began demolition in June 2010 and earmarked the site as a multi-storey car park and commercial development. Plans for the site were changed during the COVID-19 pandemic when a key major retail store withdrew from the regeneration scheme. The opportunity was taken to create a high-quality public space to serve Sheffield's growing city centre population. The planning process was managed by Sheffield City Council's Capital Delivery Service and City Regeneration & Major Projects Team, with funding from central government via the Get Building Fund and Transforming Cities Fund. Arup Group and Royal Institute of British Architects were also involved in planning with Henry Boot plc involved in construction.

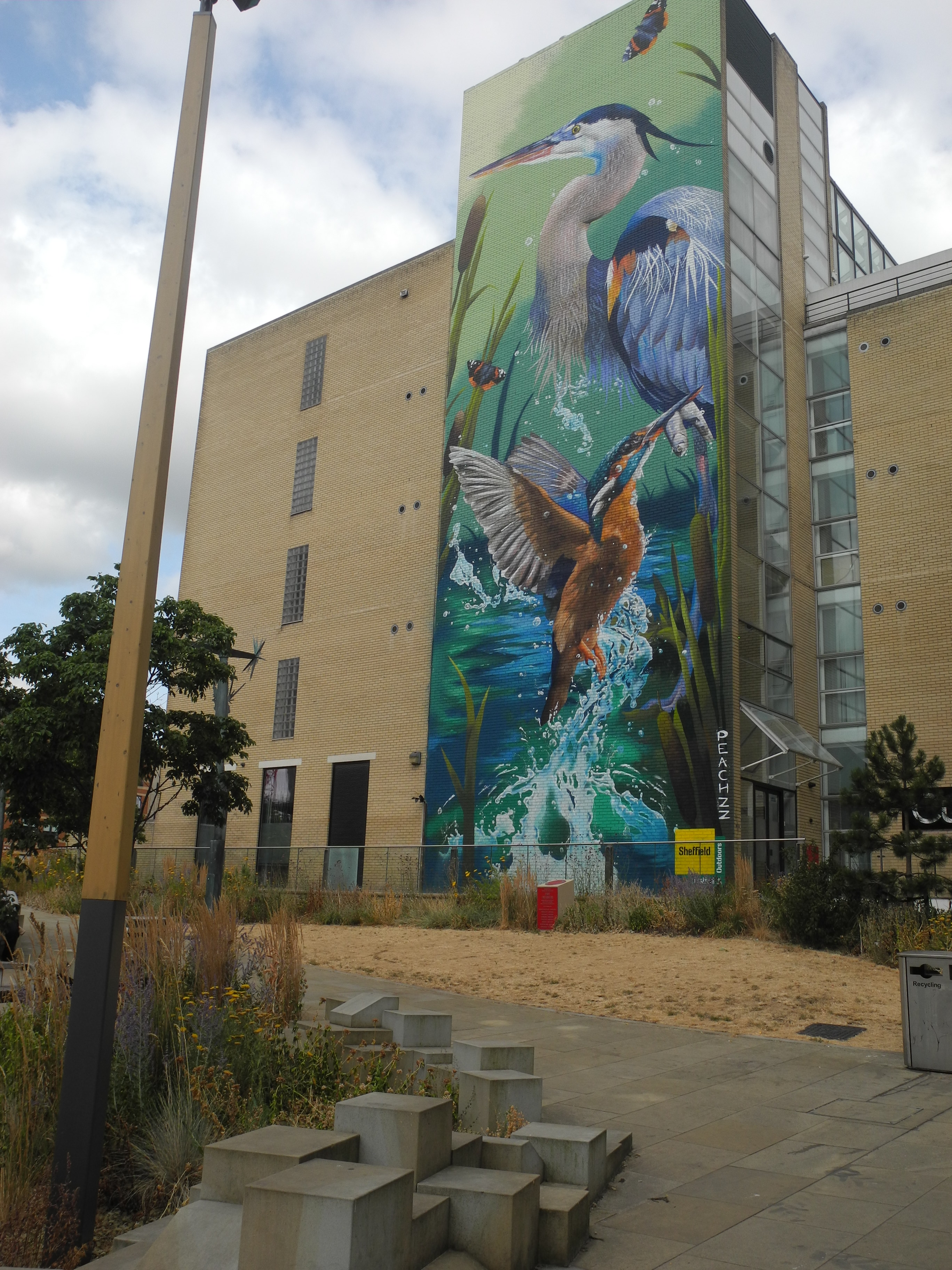
The “Reverie” street art overlooks the park.

== Park and facilities ==
The park was officially opened on 27 May 2023, although there was a brief public reveal as a trial for the Easter Bank Holiday on 3 April without the full facilities completed. The opening ceremony was attended by J.C. Pound's great-grandson Gordon as well as the park's designers, City Council dignitaries, members of South Yorkshire Fire and Rescue, and a vintage fire engine was also on display. The park's facilities include an extensive children's playground as well as seated areas for relaxation and socialising. There are also toilet facilities and a café. The playground was designed, supplied and installed by the Sheffield firm Timberplay and includes two large pyramid towers. Stainless steel slides, playhouses, a seesaw, sandpit, climbing boulder and a number of play water features. The park also contains a large piece of street art called “Reverie” by local artist Megan Russell (known artistically as Peachzz), it is the largest mural in Sheffield and features a heron and a kingfisher.

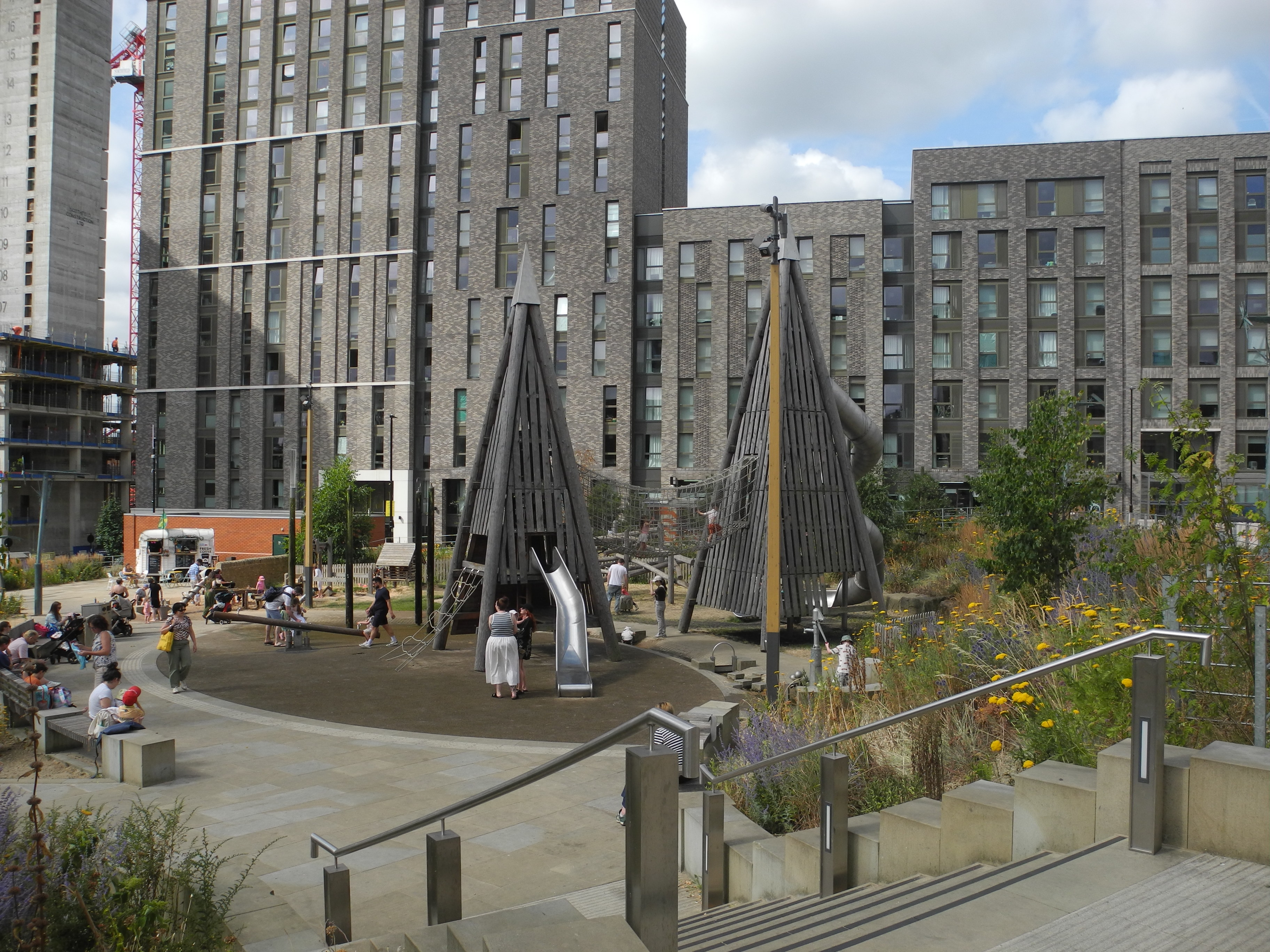
Alternative view of the children's playground.
