= Taylor's Eye Witness Works =

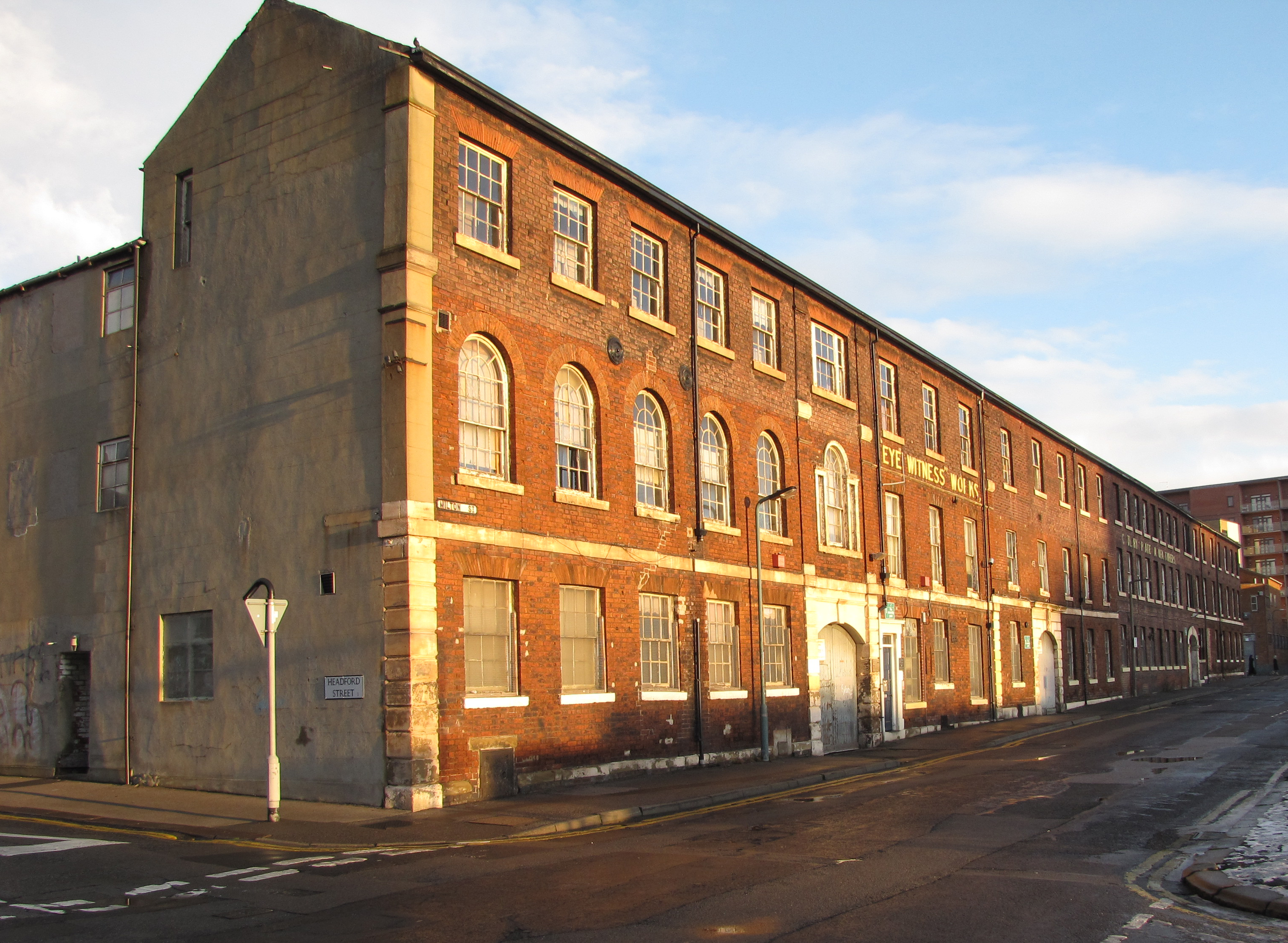
- The works seen from the junction of Milton Street and Headford Street

General information
- Classification

Listed Building – Grade II
- Designated: 13 June 1988
- Reference no.: 1271198
- Location: Sheffield, South Yorkshire, England
- Coordinates: 53.3761°N 1.4785°W
- Year built: Early 1850s–c. 1890

Taylor's Eye Witness Works is a Grade II listed former industrial building on Milton Street in the Devonshire Quarter area of Sheffield city centre, South Yorkshire, England. The works specialised in producing kitchen and pocket knives along with various associated products from its construction in 1852 until their vacation in 2018. The building was subsequently redeveloped into apartments. It stands adjacent to Taylor's Ceylon works on the same site, and the Beehive Works on Milton Street, both also listed cutlery works.

== History ==
John Taylor founded a knife and edge tools firm around the year 1820 in St. Phillip's Road in the Netherthorpe area of the city. In 1838 Taylor applied for and was granted the Eye Witness trademark for his goods, it is said he chose it after being inspired by the line "No eye hath seen such" from Shakespeare's Henry IV, Part 1. In 1852 Taylor moved to the newly built Eye Witness Works on Milton Street. At the time the works only consisted of five single-storey bays and were driven by steam power with a 40-foot chimney stack which is still in place today. Upon the death of John Taylor in 1854 the firm passed to his daughter who had married into the Needham family who were also knife producers.

An advertisement for the Taylor's Eye Witness Works from the 1890s.

The company became known as Needhams Ltd, joining forces with James Veall in 1876 and the well-known local firm of Tyzack's in 1879 to form Needham, Veall & Tyzack. In 1870 the firm only employed 30 people, but such was its success in the latter years of the 19th century that by the 1890s there were several hundred people employed at the works. In 1875, the Eye Witness Works were extended by making the original single-floor building into three storeys plus the addition of a further nine bays, which were also on three levels. The firm become a limited company in 1897 with capital of £60,000 with Walter Tyzack as chairman and James and William Veall as directors.

An account of the mechanised procedure and products at the Eye Witness Works can be found in an 1897 edition of Sheffield and Rotherham Illustrated, here is an excerpt:

The leading features of Messrs Needham, Veall & Tyzack manufactures in these departments are pen and pocket knives in an infinite variety of useful and elegant shapes, table knives, butchers' knives, carvers, scissors, pruning shears, and razors of the finest make in hollow and plain ground, for which latter goods in particular their reputation is speedily becoming world-wide. Some idea of the range of patterns kept in these various goods may be derived from the fact that in pen and pocket knives alone the firm possess over two thousand separate designs, most of which are made in four or five separate coverings.

After World War I the firm was hit by the downturn in demand for high-quality pocket knives brought on by the invention of stainless steel, but mechanised its production process and survived. The firm started to expand again, taking over several well-known Sheffield cutlery companies and their trademarks. The works continued to enlarge with this upturn in business, with new buildings being added on Thomas Street in 1950. In 1965 Needham, Veall & Tyzack became known as Taylor's Eye Witness to take advantage of its well-known trade mark. In 1975 it was bought by Harrison Fisher & Co who continued to use the Taylor's Eye Witness brand name for many of its products as well as producing "own label" goods for department stores, including John Lewis, Tesco and Sainsbury's.

On 1 June 2007 Harrison Fisher & Co Ltd changed its name to Taylors Eye Witness Limited.

In February 2007 the works were upgraded as a listed building from Grade II to Grade II*, but later reverted to Grade II. Although the building has an interesting frontage, after 20th century intervention there are few internal features of historical interest.

== Architecture ==
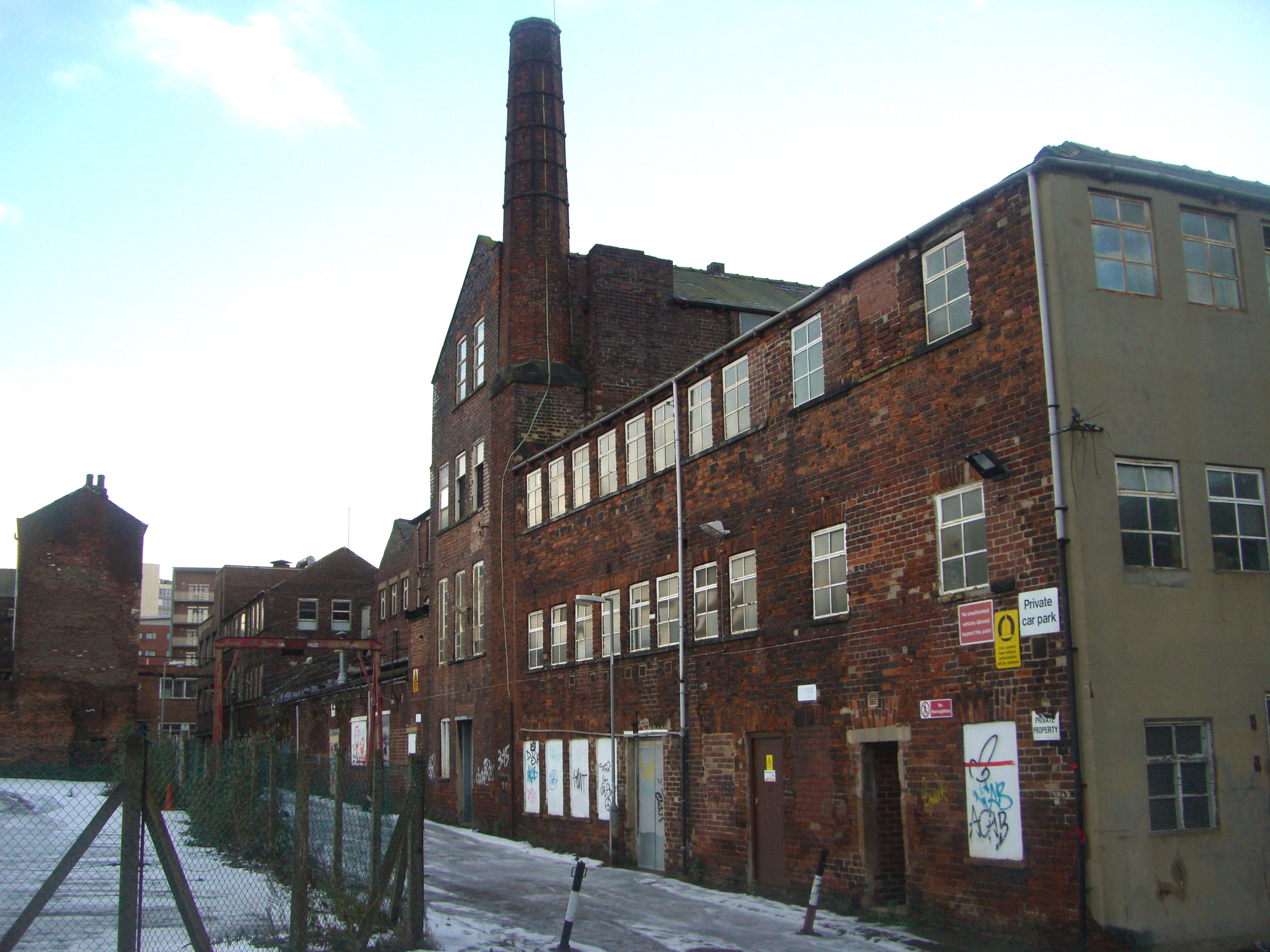
The rear of the works showing the 40 foot (approx) chimney.

The building is constructed from red brick; ordinary-quality bricks were used for the original construction while a harder and darker engineering brick was used for the later buildings. The building is rectangular in shape, and is delimited by Milton Street, Thomas Street, Headford Street, and Egerton Lane, at the rear. There are three internal courtyards, but much of this space has been infilled by other buildings over the years. The main range of the works on Milton Street has 30 bays of windows and some basements. There is an arched carriage entrance with double wooden doors.

== Relocation of Taylors Eye Witness ==
Taylors Eye Witness company wished to redevelop and sell the original works and relocate to a modern site where it can operate more efficiently. Outline plans for the redevelopment of the site were produced by local architects Bond Bryan allowing for the preservation of key features of the site including the Milton Street frontage, but were rejected by Sheffield City Council Planning Dept who wanted the vast majority of the building to be preserved.

However, the cost of the restoration of the building would be greater than the value of the restored building, so that restoration is not a viable option and cannot be used to fund a move to a more modern site. Although some of the lower value production has been moved off shore, much of Taylors Eye Witness' output is made in Sheffield, generating employment, creating wealth and keeping an important part of Sheffield Manufacturing Heritage and skills base alive and kicking.

== Restoration of Eyewitness Works and Ceylon Works ==
Social impact property developers Capital&Centric purchased Eyewitness Works in 2018. Eye Witness Works, along with adjacent Ceylon Works, is being renovated into apartments, duplexes and townhouses. Capital&Centric is restoring and preserving the site's key features.

As part of the 97 home development, Capital&Centric is also building a 6-storey new build called Brunswick, named after The Brunswick Hotel which used to stand on the site. Eye Witness Works also has one commercial unit for an independent cafe-bar operator.

In March 2022, it was announced that Eye Witness Works would be the location of a new Channel 4 interior design show with the working title Design Your Dream. The winning contestant will win a 2-bedroom apartment at Eye Witness Works. Filming is due to start in Summer 2022.
