= Sheffield Digital Campus =

Business park in Sheffield, England

Coordinates: 53°22′49.1″N 1°27′45.2″W

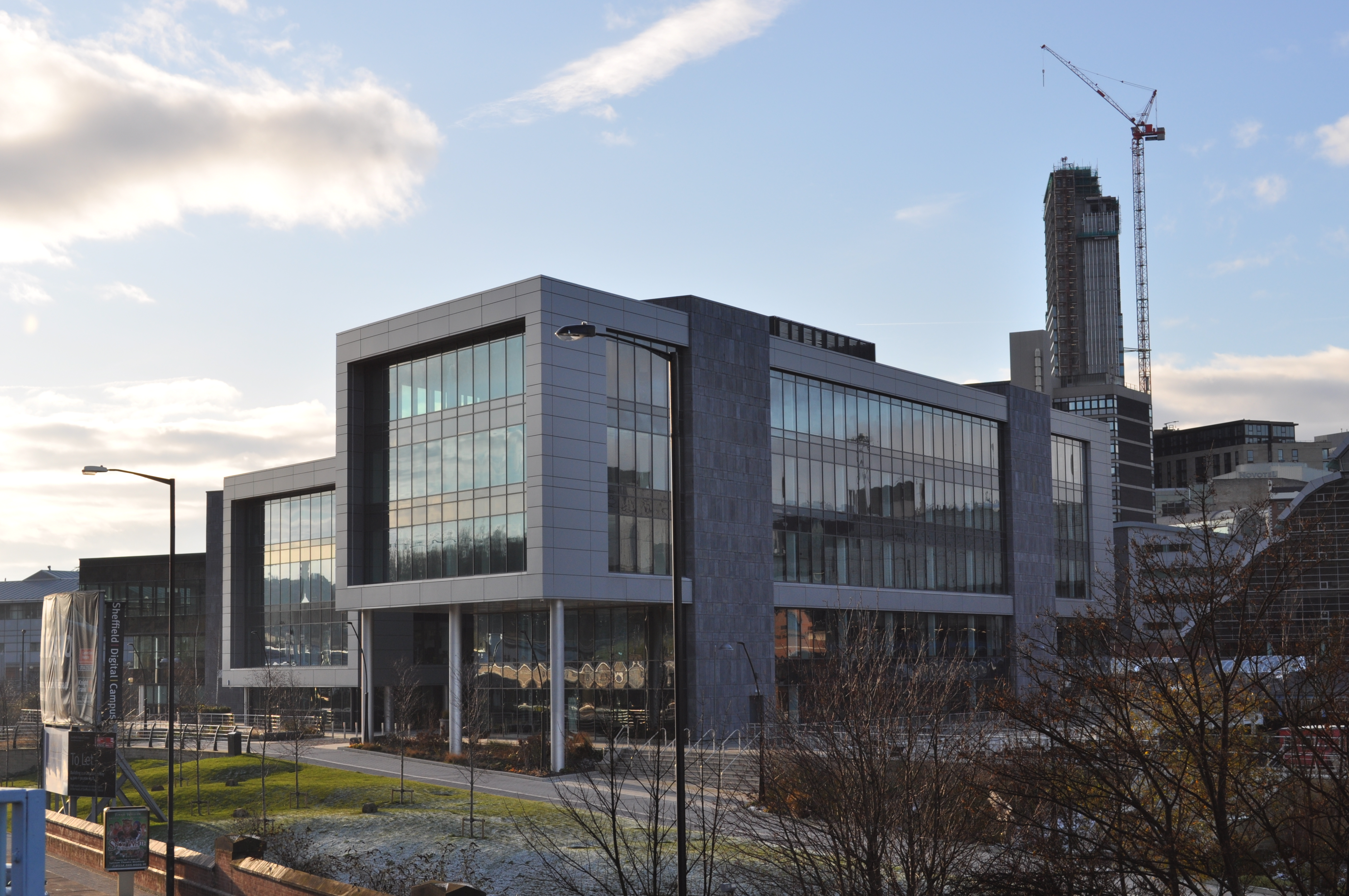
Sheffield Digital Campus

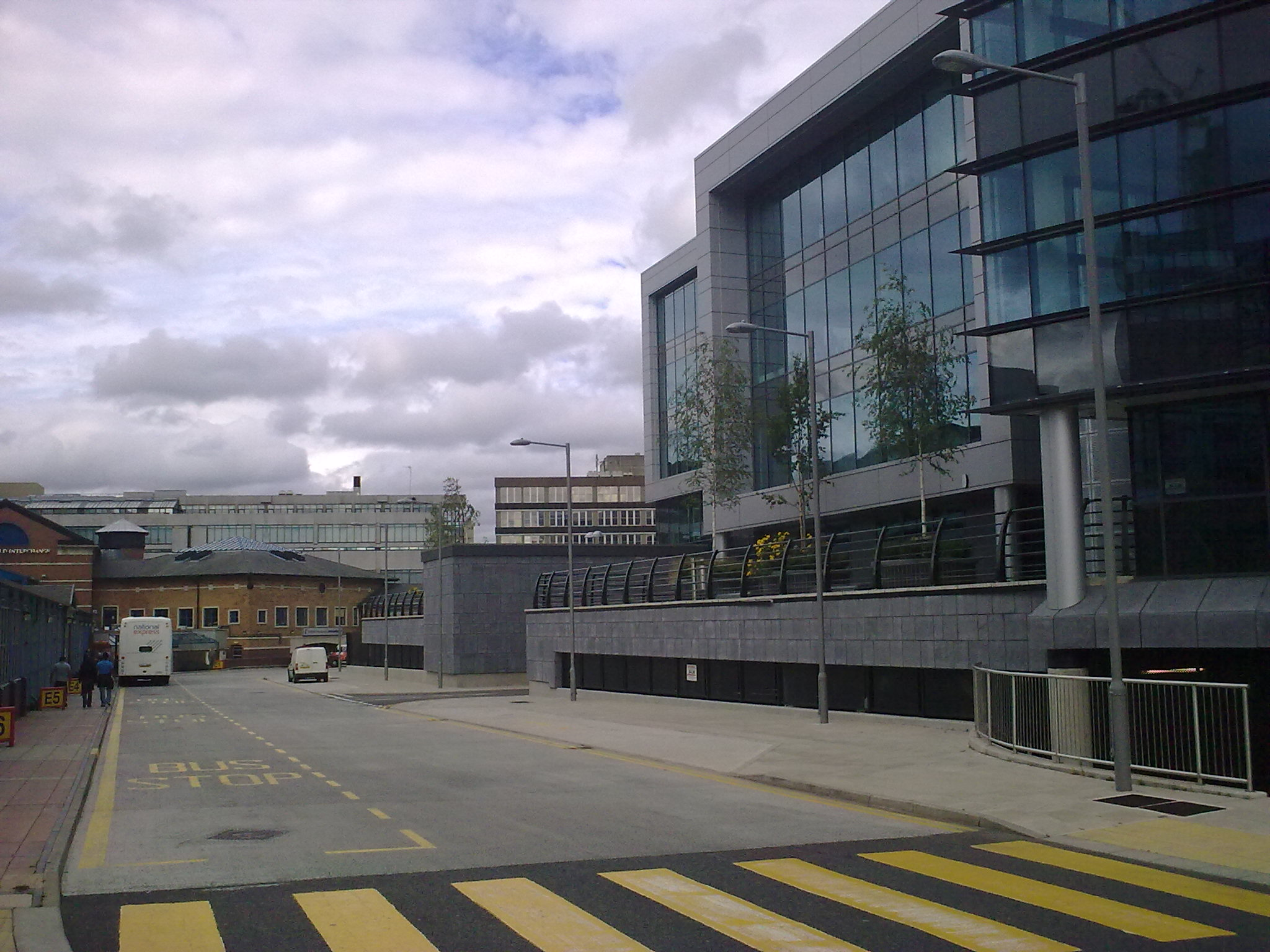
The Sheffield Digital Campus development (right) and Sheffield Interchange (left)

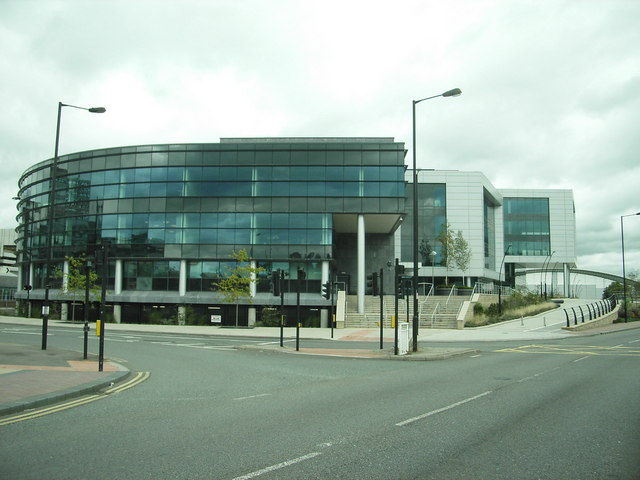
Electric Works

The Sheffield Digital Campus is a new development in Sheffield City Centre close to the railway station and bus station.

Partners include the developer Teesland/GMI, Sheffield City Council, Creative Sheffield, the city centre urban regeneration company and Yorkshire Forward, the regional development agency. Over £1.6 million of European Union funds are being invested in South Yorkshire's infrastructure and so it is hoped that businesses locating into the eCampus, may qualify for Regional Selective Assistance and Regional Enterprise Grants.

The development which will offer over 600,000 sq ft (56,000 m^{2}) of high quality office accommodation, as a custom built hub for digital, ICT, multi-media and software companies.

The layout of the campus will be flexible to cater for companies of all sizes and to adapt to the changing needs of its tenants. The campus will be designed as a series of contemporary buildings and landscaped open spaces.

== Construction ==
Construction of the campus has been divided into three phases.

Phase 1 will consist of four separate buildings of which two are already completed. Two further building are under construction.

The Phase 2 building will be constructed on the site of the (now demolished) Nelson Mandela Building situated on the corner of Pond Street and Sheaf Street.

The Phase 3 building will be constructed on the site of the (now demolished) Sheaf House and Dyson House buildings, situated between Leadmill Road and Sheffield railway station.

Tha landscape architects for the scheme were Donaldson Edwards Partnership based in Manchester.

== See also ==
- Kroto Innovation Centre
- Sheffield Bioincubator
