= Devonshire Green =

Open space in Sheffield, England

Devonshire Green is a small public open space at 53.3789°N 1.4783°W within Sheffield city centre in South Yorkshire, England. It covers an area of approximately 9000 square metres and is designated as a district park by Sheffield City Council.

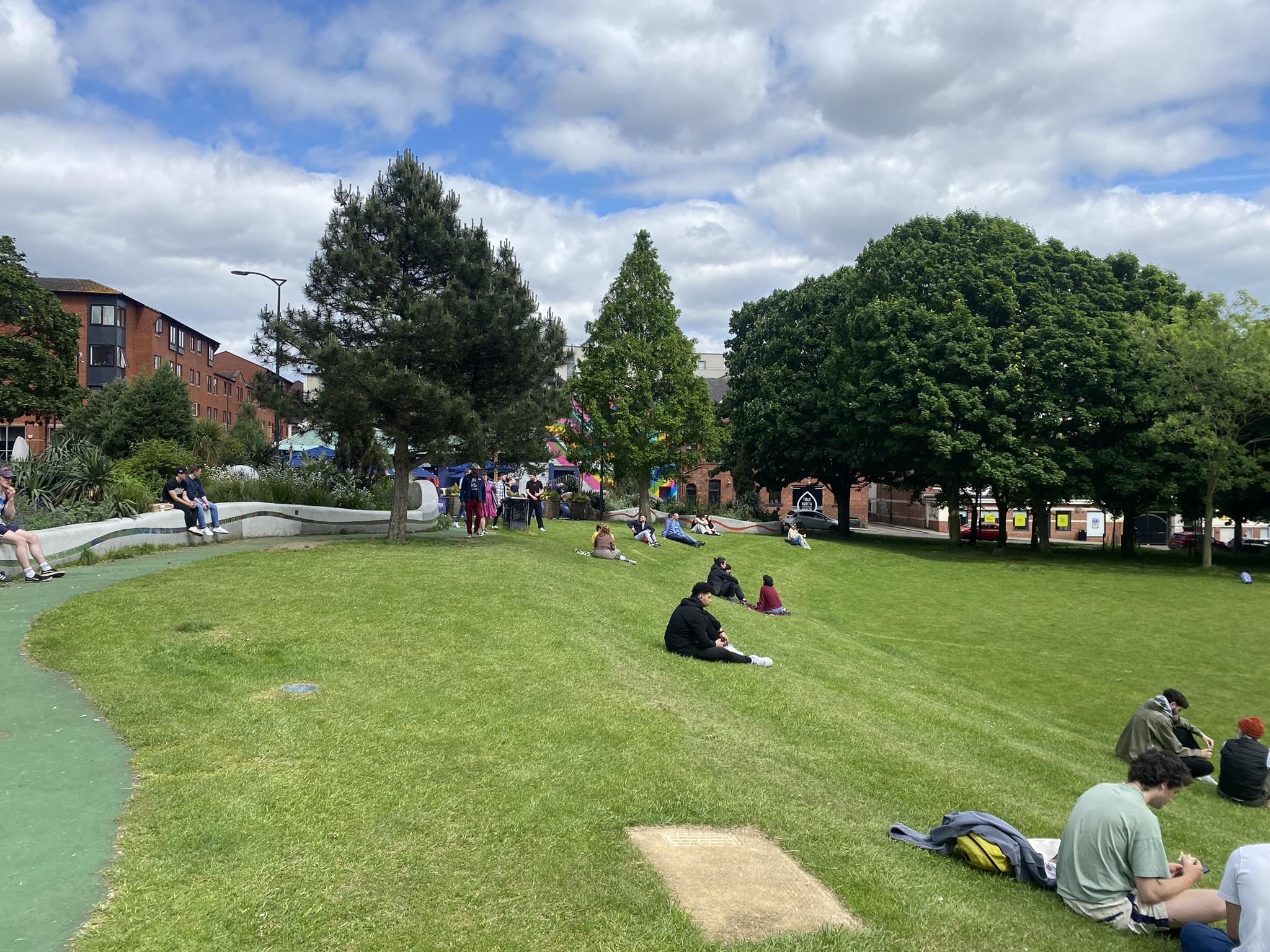
Devonshire Green

It stands in the Devonshire Quarter of the city centre, bordered on its four sides by Devonshire Street, Fitzwilliam Street, Eldon Street and Wellington Street. It is the only large green space in the city centre.

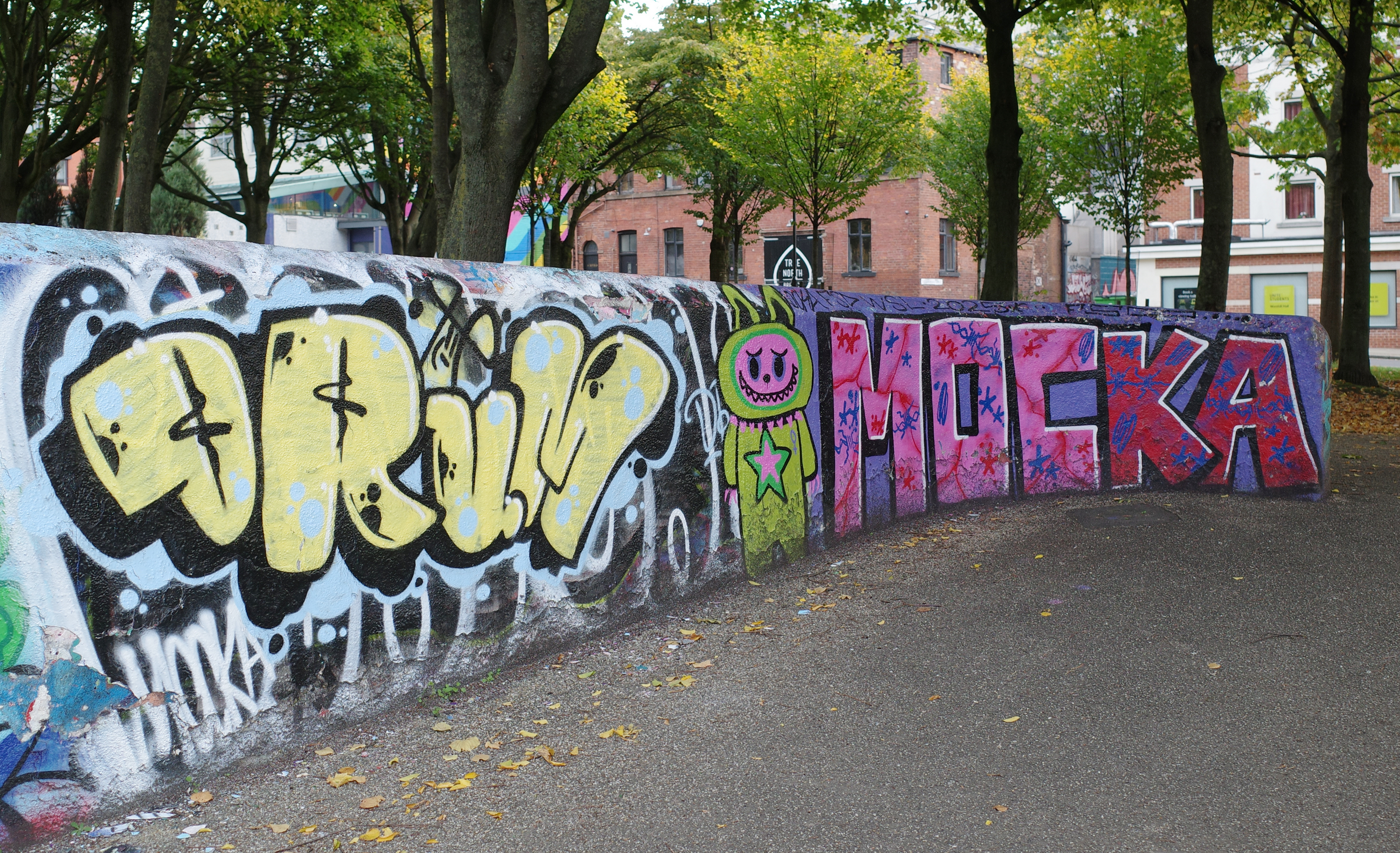
Street Art at the Skatepark

== History ==
Prior to World War II the area which is now Devonshire Green was a neighbourhood of housing and small firms. This area had originally been built in the first half of the 19th century on land belonging to William FitzWilliam, the 4th Earl FitzWilliam of Wentworth Woodhouse, who was the local lord of the manor.

The Devonshire Green area of Sheffield was heavily bombed in the Sheffield Blitz of December 1940 with the thoroughfares of Chester Street, Devonshire Lane and the upper part of Broomhall Street being badly damaged and left as a bomb site. After the war the site was cleared and remained as an undeveloped area, eventually serving as a temporary car parking area for the city centre. In 1981 Devonshire Green was created as a public green area with seating and pedestrian footpaths crossing it, it was officially dedicated to those who died in the Blitz of 1940. In the 1990s a floodlit skatepark was built on the southern part of the Green for skateboarders and BMX bikers. By the early part of the 21st century the Green was looking rundown and needed a facelift with large flocks of pigeons gathering in the area. The building of much new property around the Green prompted the creation of the Devonshire Quarter Action Plan which urged investment for the benefit of new residents.

== Modern renovation ==
On 29 January 2007, Sheffield City Council announced plans to upgrade Devonshire Green. The £1.6 million project was designed by the City Council's Regeneration Projects Design Team and funded by building developers who had built housing developments in the West Street area such as West One which faces onto Devonshire Green. The redevelopment included the complete relaying of all the turfed areas and the planting of 340 square metres of high-quality flower beds which contain more than 23,000 bulbs and 22 semi-mature trees. Sculptured "sitting walls" were created to provide 184 metres of seating and enclosure for the planting beds which line the boulevards which have improved lighting. A terraced grass amphitheatre space was also created which can be used for events and festivals. The skatepark remained open during the redevelopment which was carried out by the contractors Wrekin Construction and the revamped park was reopened in Spring 2008.
