= Sheffield city centre =

Central business district in South Yorkshire, England

Coordinates: 53.381°N 1.475°W

- Central business district
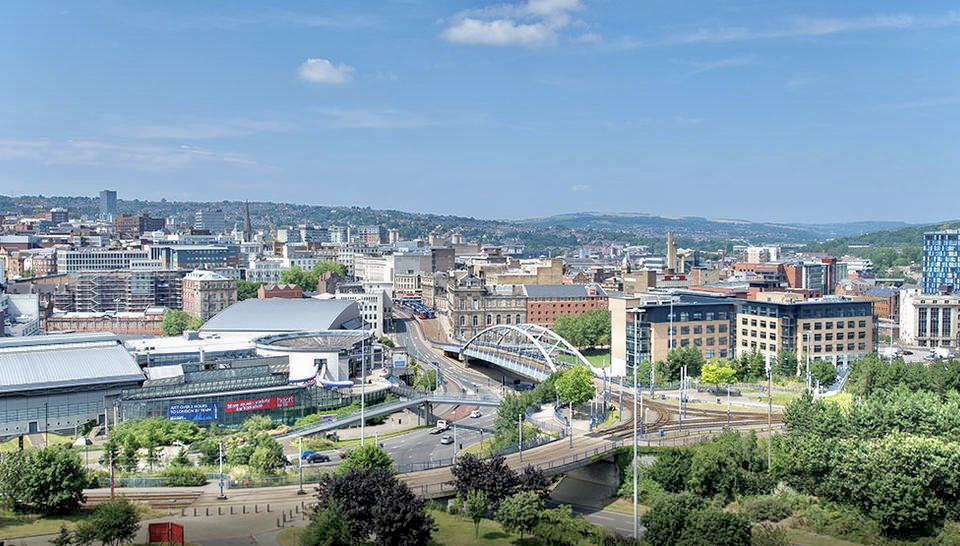
- Skyline view of the city

- Location within Sheffield
- OS grid reference: SK356873
  - London: 144 mi (232 km) SSE
- Metropolitan borough: City of Sheffield
- Metropolitan county: South Yorkshire
- Region: Yorkshire and the Humber
- Country: England
- Sovereign state: United Kingdom
- Post town: SHEFFIELD
- Postcode district: S1, S2, S3
- Dialling code: 0114
- Police: South Yorkshire
- Fire: South Yorkshire
- Ambulance: Yorkshire
- UK Parliament: Sheffield Central

Sheffield city centre (referred to locally as simply Town) is a district of the City of Sheffield and is covered partly by the City ward of the City of Sheffield. It includes the area that is within a radius of roughly 0.75 miles (1.2 km) of Sheffield Cathedral and is encircled by the Inner Ring Road, a circular route started in the late 1960s and completed in 2007. As well as the cathedral, buildings in the city centre include the Grade I listed Town Hall, the City Hall and the Winter Gardens.

Several areas of the city centre have been designated as quarters. It is home to the city's major business, transport, leisure and cultural attractions. In recent years, the city centre has undergone massive regeneration with every section of the city centre seeing constant development. Projects include the development of new squares and public spaces; new residential and office buildings, including St. Pauls Tower, Velocity Living and New Era Square; the Heart of the City II and Moor shopping areas; redevelopment of existing buildings, such as the Crucible Theatre; better transport and shopping facilities; and new cultural attractions, such as museums and art galleries.

== Zones and quarters ==
Following the implementation of the 1994 City Centre Strategy, 11 'quarters' were defined within the city centre. Following on from this, during the 2004 redevelopment of the city centre four 'districts' were identified within the city centre, primarily for aiding traffic.

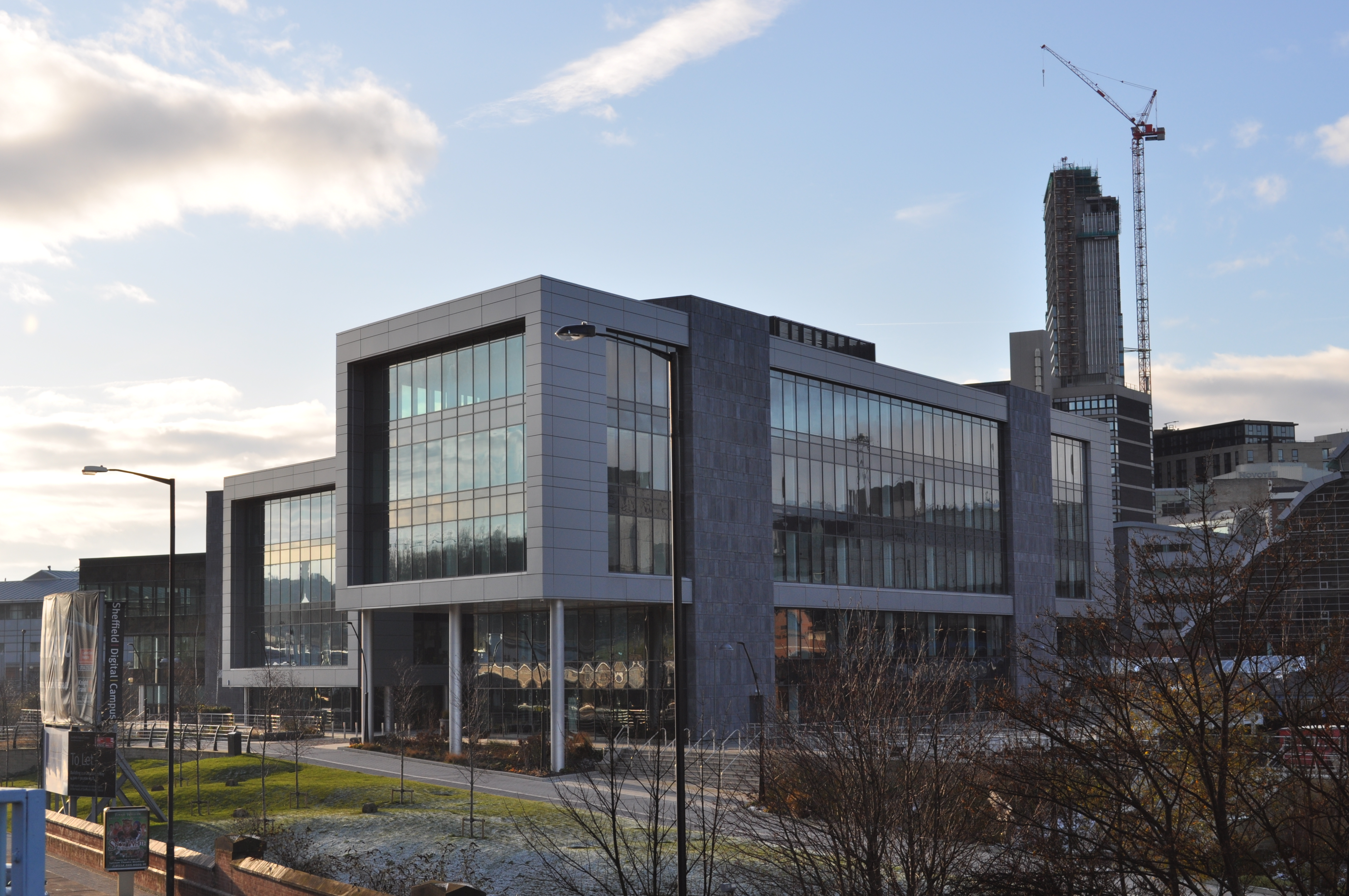
Sheffield Digital Campus

The city's quarters are: Kelham Island Quarter, Riverside, Castlegate, Sheaf Valley, Cultural Industries Quarter, The Moor Quarter, Devonshire Quarter, St Georges Quarter, St Vincent's Quarter, Cathedral Quarter and Heart of the City.

The main districts are as follows:

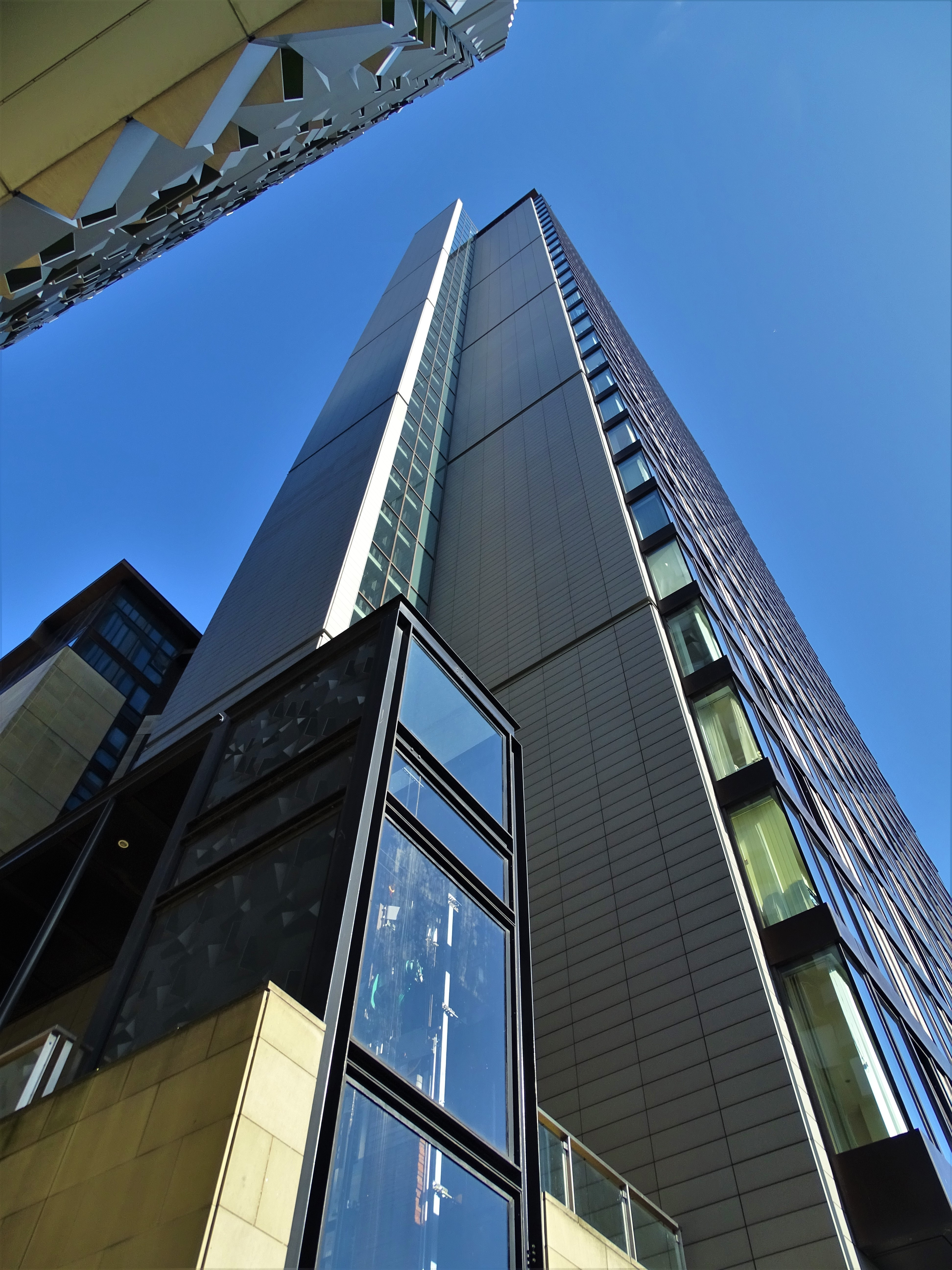
St Paul's Place, 2010

=== City Centre ===
The central district of Sheffield is home to the Town Hall and the major shopping areas of Fargate, Orchard Square and Commercial Street. The city's famous 1 o' clock time signal is located where Barker's Pool meets Leopold Street on the side of H.L. Brown the jewellers and sounds a daily siren to tell the time. The Heart of the City area, as its name suggests, lies at the centre of this zone and encompasses the Town Hall and Peace Gardens, a major focal point for people in the city. Adjacent to this is St Paul's Place, in centre of Sheffield, a new mixed use development lying between the Town Hall and Arundel Gate, one of the major roads running through the city centre. Sheffield's tallest building, St Pauls Tower, is situated on the edge of St Paul's place, close to both the Town Hall and Sheffield Station. At the opposite end of Fargate to the Town Hall is the Cathedral Quarter. Here there are numerous law firms and employment agencies, as well as numerous shops and the city centre hub for the Sheffield Supertram. The city centre has several cinemas including, Odeon Sheffield located on Arundel Gate, 'The Light' cinema on The Moor and the independent 'Showroom' cinema based near Sheaf Square.

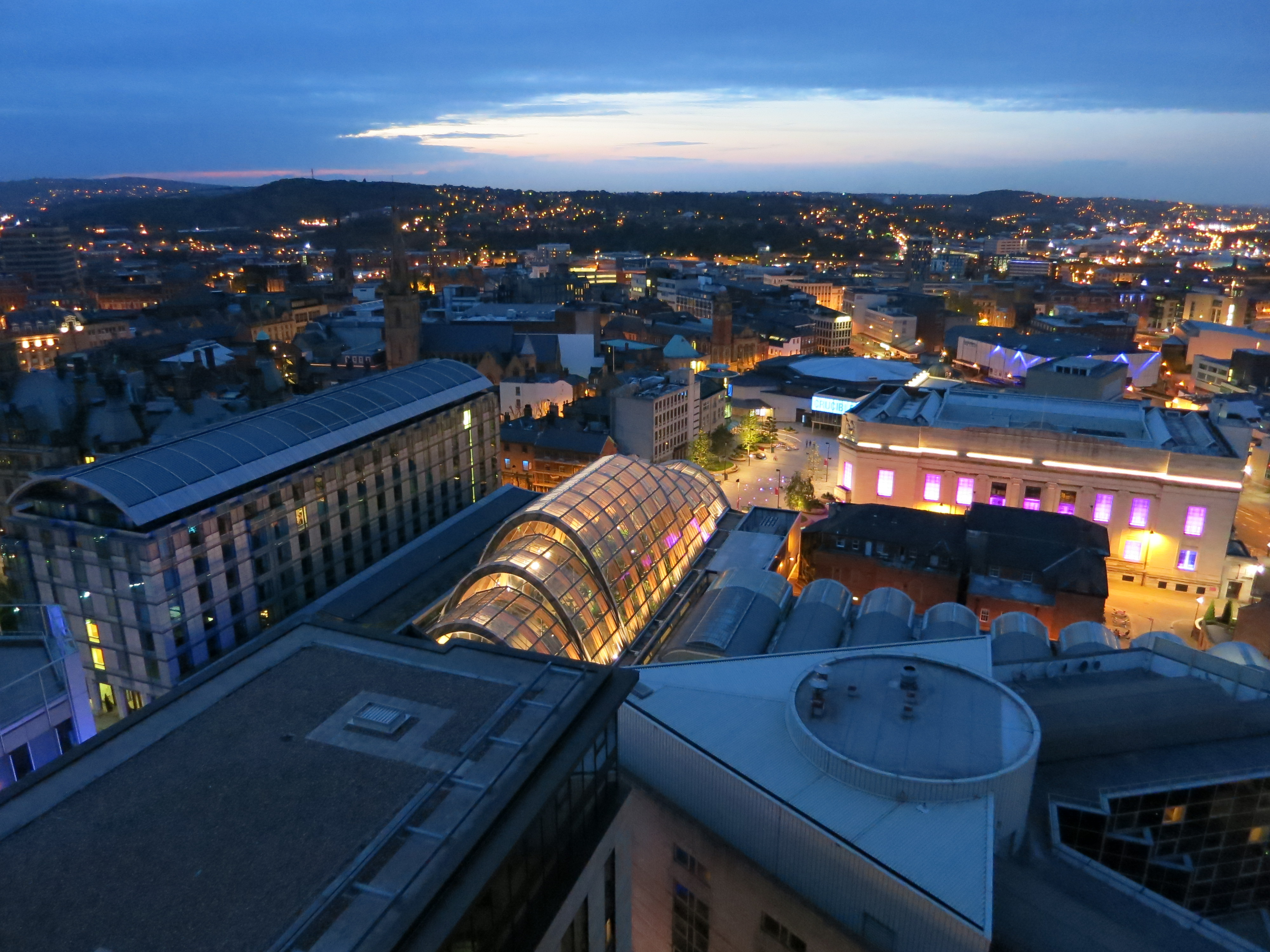
Sheffield Centre at Night

Also within the central zone is The Moor. Originally Sheffield's primary shopping area, it became run down and lost some of its prominence due to uncertainty surrounding the adjacent and now axed Sevenstone retail development. However, the opening of a new purpose-built indoor market hall in November 2013 and the ongoing Sheffield Moor Development plan footfall has increased and there has been a stimulation of businesses reopening and moving into the area. The Scottish Widows group own the majority of The Moor and are funding its staged redevelopment, including the significant public realm improvements to the street scene that were completed during 2013.

=== Riverside ===
The Riverside District, lying along the banks of the River Don, was traditionally an industrial zone including the Kelham Island Quarter. In the 21st century it has become dominated by new office developments and apartment complexes. The Riverside Exchange and West Bar developments are a significant part of this change and have seen the area transformed dramatically. Also in this area is the St Vincent Quarter which lies on the opposite bank of the River Don to the Riverside Exchange area.

=== Sheaf Valley ===
The Sheaf Valley Area, surrounding the River Sheaf, is dominated by Sheaf Square/Sheffield Station and the Cultural Industries Quarter (CIQ). Sheaf Square, which has been completely redeveloped in recent years, now serves as gateway to the city centre. Sheffield Station, serving as the entrance to this gateway has also been redeveloped whilst maintaining its grand Victorian façade. The CIQ is home to several bars and clubs (such as the Leadmill) and the Showroom Cinema, which books a more diverse selection of films than mainstream cinemas.

Sheffield Town Hall and Peace Gardens

Red Tape Studios is also in the area. This area, in contrast to the other parts of the city centre, has seen less redevelopment in recent years as it lies outside the normal shopping areas and those frequented by tourists/visitors to the city.

=== West End ===
The West End District, lying to the West of the Central zone, is the city's social and academic hub. West Street, the main thoroughfare in this area, is home to Sheffield's largest concentration of bars, clubs and restaurants and is heavily used by young adults, students in particular. Many university buildings are in this area, including many parts of the Sheffield Teaching Hospitals (although they mostly lie beyond the Inner Ring Road and thus do not constitute part of the City Centre). The Supertram also runs through this district, connecting it to the central zone and several other areas of the city. The Devonshire Quarter, on the southside of West Street, is a social and commercial hub, again especially for the young. It has seen a great deal of investment. The St Georges Quarter, right in the centre of the West End zone, is relatively small and focused upon the end of West Street as it meets the Inner Ring Road at Sheffield University Officer Training Corps home - Somme Barracks, main entrance is on Gell Street.

== New and future developments ==
In recent years, there have been numerous new developments in Sheffield City Centre seeing a large number of new additions to the skyline. Most of this work has been carried out under the guidance of the 'City Centre Masterplan 2008' and examples of its progress can be seen Tudor Square, Riverside, Castlegate and the Sheffield Digital Campus.

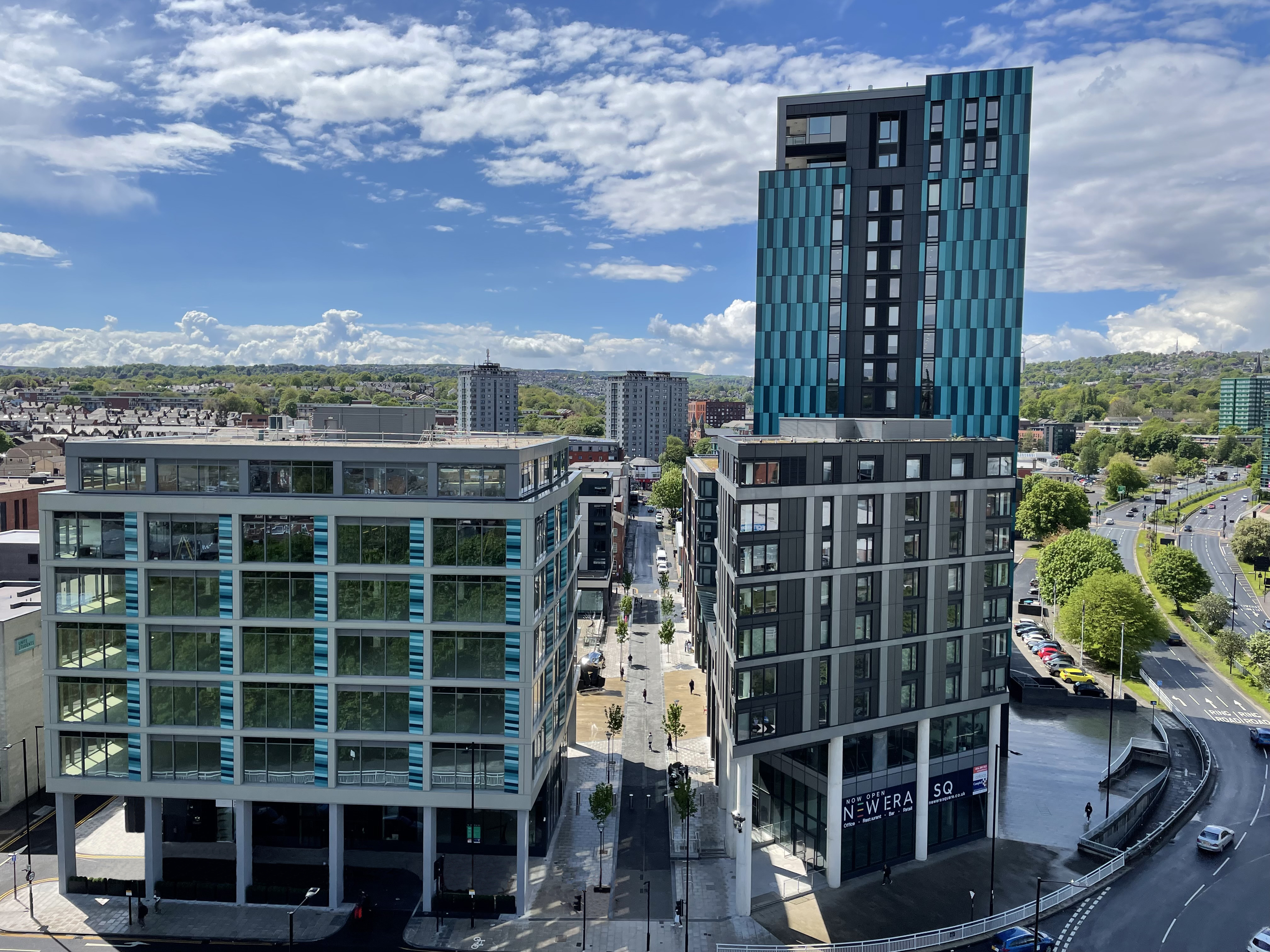
New Era Square

St Paul's place is one of the most notable developments and features Sheffield's tallest tower. Riverside exchange and the West Bar combine to make a large business district on the north side of the city centre and are also home to legal and governmental offices.

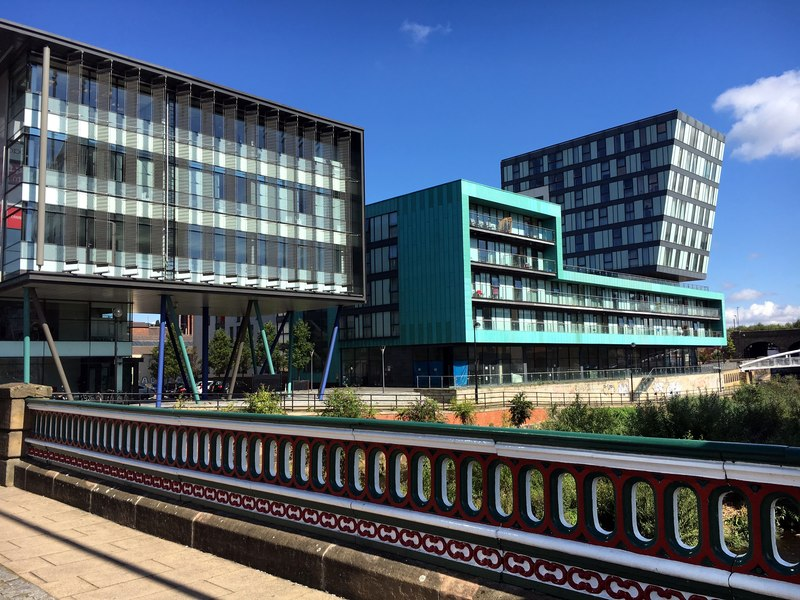
Riverside Developments with the River Don below

Sheaf Square and the Sheffield Station have also been heavily redeveloped and are due to see extras improvements in the next few years. In the West End area the University of Sheffield has invested in a number of new facilities and student accommodation and Sheffield Hallam University has greatly improved the area outside its main campus on Arundel Gate also.

In late 2006, the "Connect Sheffield" scheme came into being. As part of this scheme, vehicle signage was improved by dividing the centre into four main areas (separate from the quarters) using electronic messaging panels with information about congestion and available parking and information about transport and visitor attractions. Information pillars were erected in key locations, varying from narrower pillars for bus and tram stops and the railway station to much broader pillars outside key attractions, each showing information on the immediate surroundings, a map and (in some cases) a clock. All junctions on the Inner Ring Road have been numbered and marked with a strong landmark feature. Travel information panels in bus interchanges have been made clearer and the YourNextBus system was rolled out onto departure boards at bus stops telling passengers when the next bus is due at their stop using GPS technology.

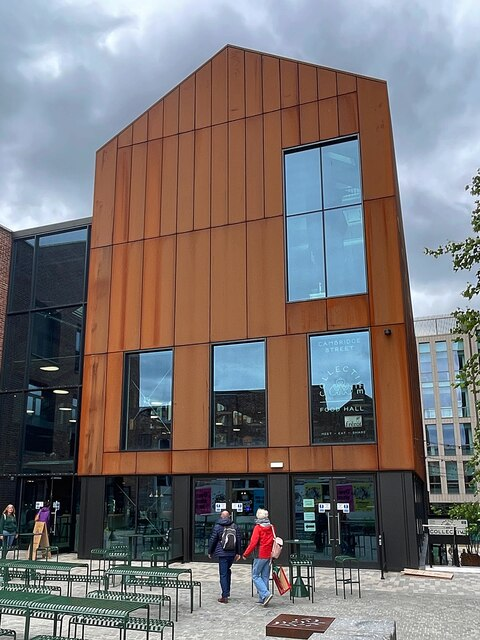
Cambridge Street Collective Food Hall

Sheffield's shopping areas are in the process of being redeveloped and when finished will attract business from further afield than ever before. The Moor, once Sheffield's busiest shopping street, is being gradually redeveloped by private owner Scottish Widows and a new £18 million indoor market was opened in 2013, relocating traders from the ageing Castle Market in the Castle Gate Quarter of the city.

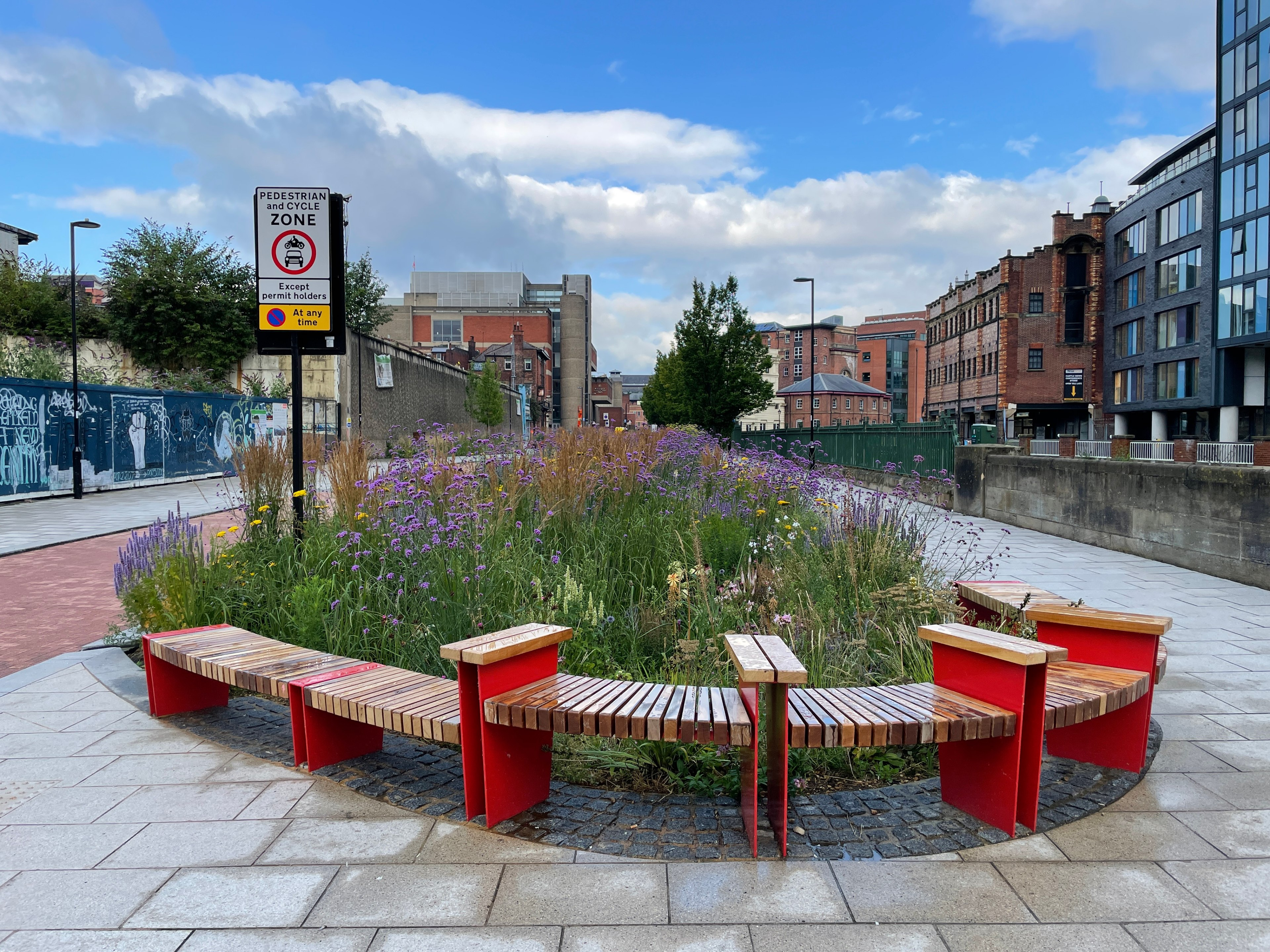
Castlegate

The Sevenstone/New Retail Quarter development was due to redevelop a substantial portion of the city centre. It had been on hold since 2008 due to the recession and was cancelled in its current form all together in July 2013 when Sheffield City Council decided to relieve developer Hammerson of their development rights. Sheffield City Council announced in late 2013 that they will proceed with their own development scheme to replace the axed Sevenstone project. This was renamed Heart of the City II.

== Events ==
Sheffield City Centre is host to a multitude of events, ranging from small farmers markets to international sporting events. Sheffield International Venues and Sheffield Theatres maintain the larger venues whilst several others are managed privately.

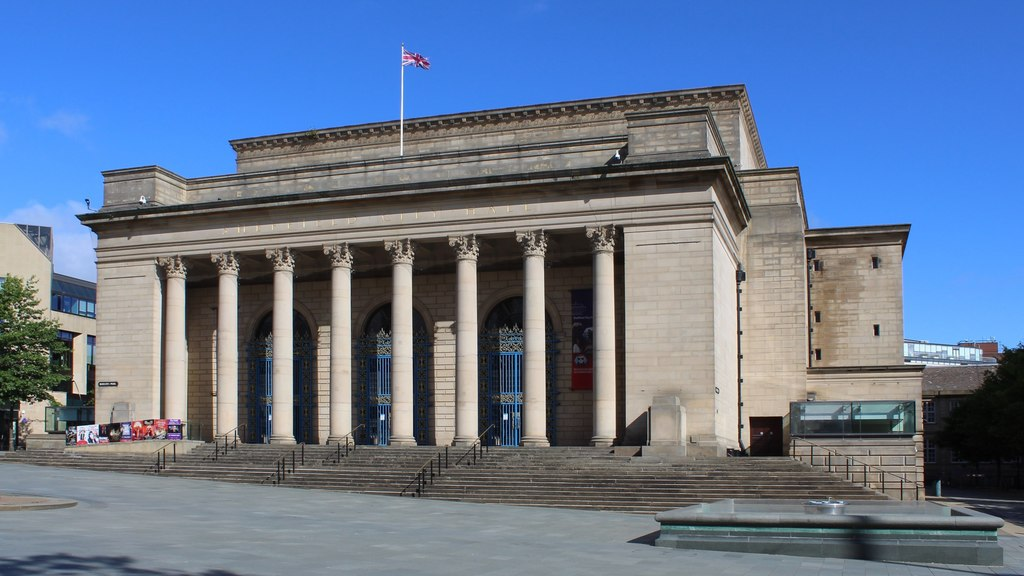
Sheffield City Hall from Barker's Pool.

=== Sport ===
Ponds Forge International Sports Centre, on the edge of the city centre, is host to numerous national and international sporting events, notably swimming and basketball.

The Crucible Theatre, in Tudor Square, has hosted the World Snooker Championships since 1977.

Sheffield City Centre was the finish location for Stage 2 for the 2014 edition of the Tour de France.

=== Theatre ===
Sheffield theatres include the Crucible, Lyceum, Montgomery and Playhouse theatres.

=== Live events ===
Sheffield city centre is host to its own music festival, Tramlines. This event, entry to which is free, was first organised in 2009 and takes place at several venues across Sheffield, notably in the city centre.

=== Markets ===
Sheffield City Centre plays host to a number of themed markets throughout the year with most taking place on Fargate, in the Peace Gardens or at Barkers Pool. Themes include Continental (European foods, crafts etc.), German (Christmas market) Italian, Tunisian and occasionally global themed markets take place. There are also farmers and crafts markets taking place throughout the year.

== Transport ==
=== Railway ===
Sheffield railway station lies on the edge of the city centre and is within easy walking distance of the main shopping areas. This station lies at the northern end of the Midland Main Line which begins at London St Pancras, thus affording Sheffield direct rail services to the capital and to Europe, via the Eurostar service.

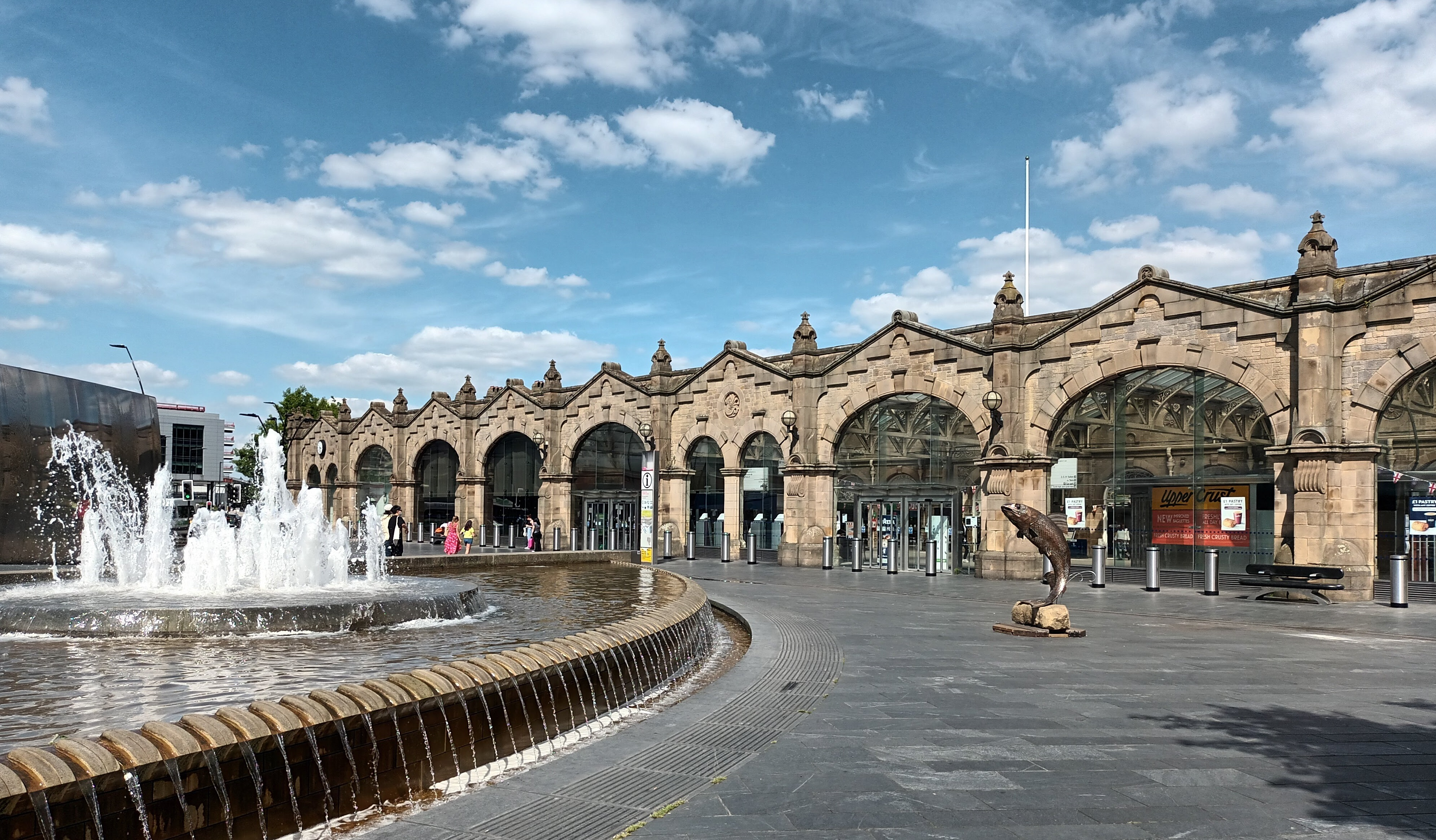
Sheffield station and Sheaf Square

Direct connections to other major UK cities are also available. Sheffield station is accessed from the central zone of the city centre by Sheaf Square and Howard Street, which leads to Arundel Gate at the Heart of the City.

=== Supertram ===
Sheffield possesses its own tram system, known as the Sheffield Supertram. It operates on four routes, all of which run through the city centre; with Cathedral stop forming a focal point for operations, being the terminus of both the Purple line and Tram-Train.

=== Coaches ===
National Express coaches serve Sheffield city centre, accessed via Sheffield Interchange. The 560/564 service travels to London Victoria Coach Station, stopping occasionally at Chesterfield and Milton Keynes en route. Numerous other services connect Sheffield with destinations across the UK, all of which depart/arrive at Sheffield Interchange.

=== Buses ===
In recent years, it has lost importance as the South Yorkshire Passenger Transport Executive have constructed several ‘mini-interchanges’ around the city centre, to accommodate shopping and other activities for areas which are served poorly by Sheffield Interchange. However, many services depart from/arrive here and it is within a short walking distance of Sheffield station.

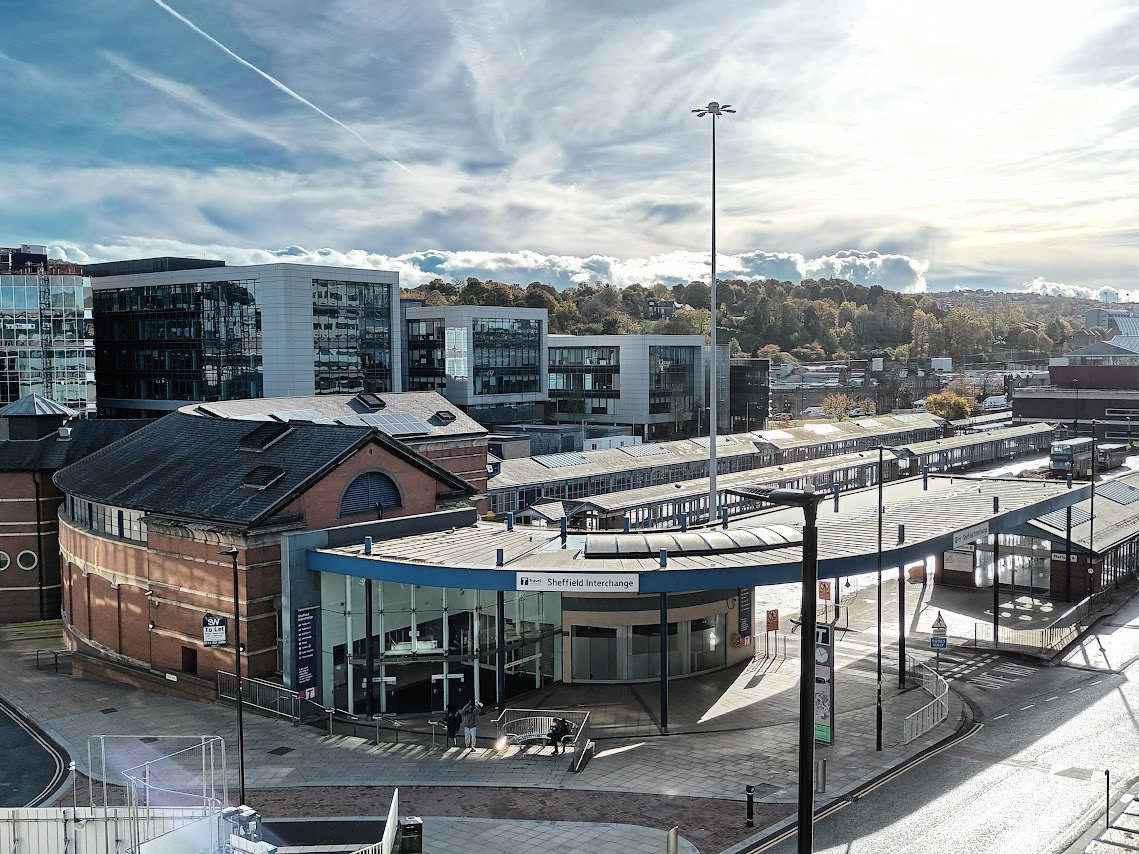
Sheffield Interchange

The FreeBee, a zero fare city centre bus service, was scrapped in 2014.

=== Road ===
The city centre is encircled by the Inner Ring Road, which connects to the Sheffield Parkway at Park Square and on to the M1 motorway. This has been enlarged several times, with the most recent extension opening in 2007.

In a bid to improve the city centre's environment, several major thoroughfares which were once open to the public have been pedestrianised in recent decades; as a consequence, there are fewer options for car drivers in the city centre.

== Leisure and business ==
=== Fargate ===
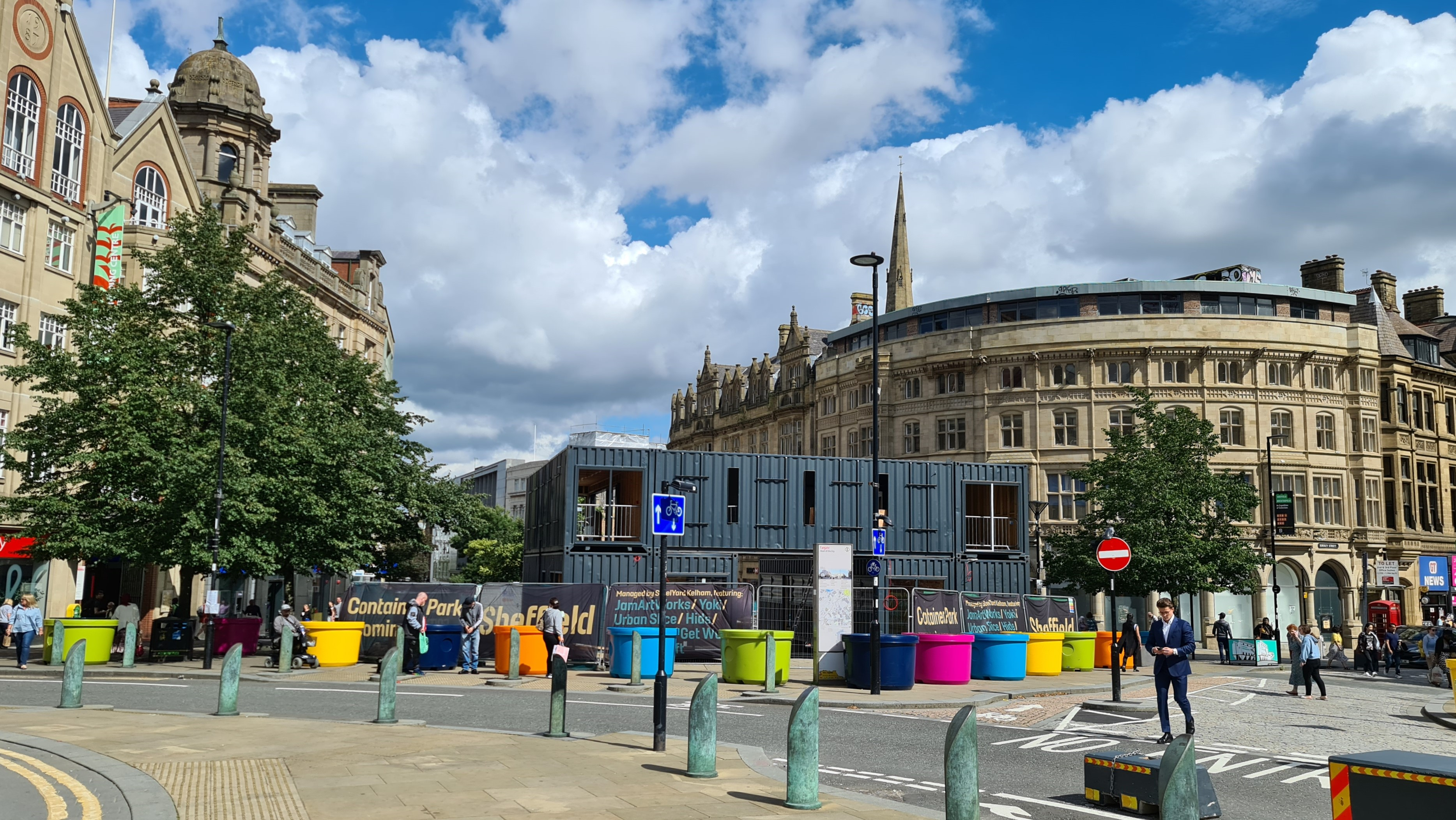
Fargate, Sheffield

Fargate is a major pedestrianised street in the heart of the city with its southern end lying outside the town hall. Also located at this point was the Wheel of Sheffield which, during 2009 and 2010, was a landmark on the Sheffield skyline.

Several well-known High Street stores have a presence in this area or the connecting areas of Orchard Square or Commercial Street.

=== The Moor ===
The Moor has historically been one of Sheffield's most popular shopping zones. Like Fargate, it is a pedestrianised area and plays host to markets (although on a more permanent basis than Fargate). By the early 2010s The Moor had become run down and played host to a massive redevelopment project. The Moor Market, a large indoor market opened in November 2013 at a cost of £18 million.

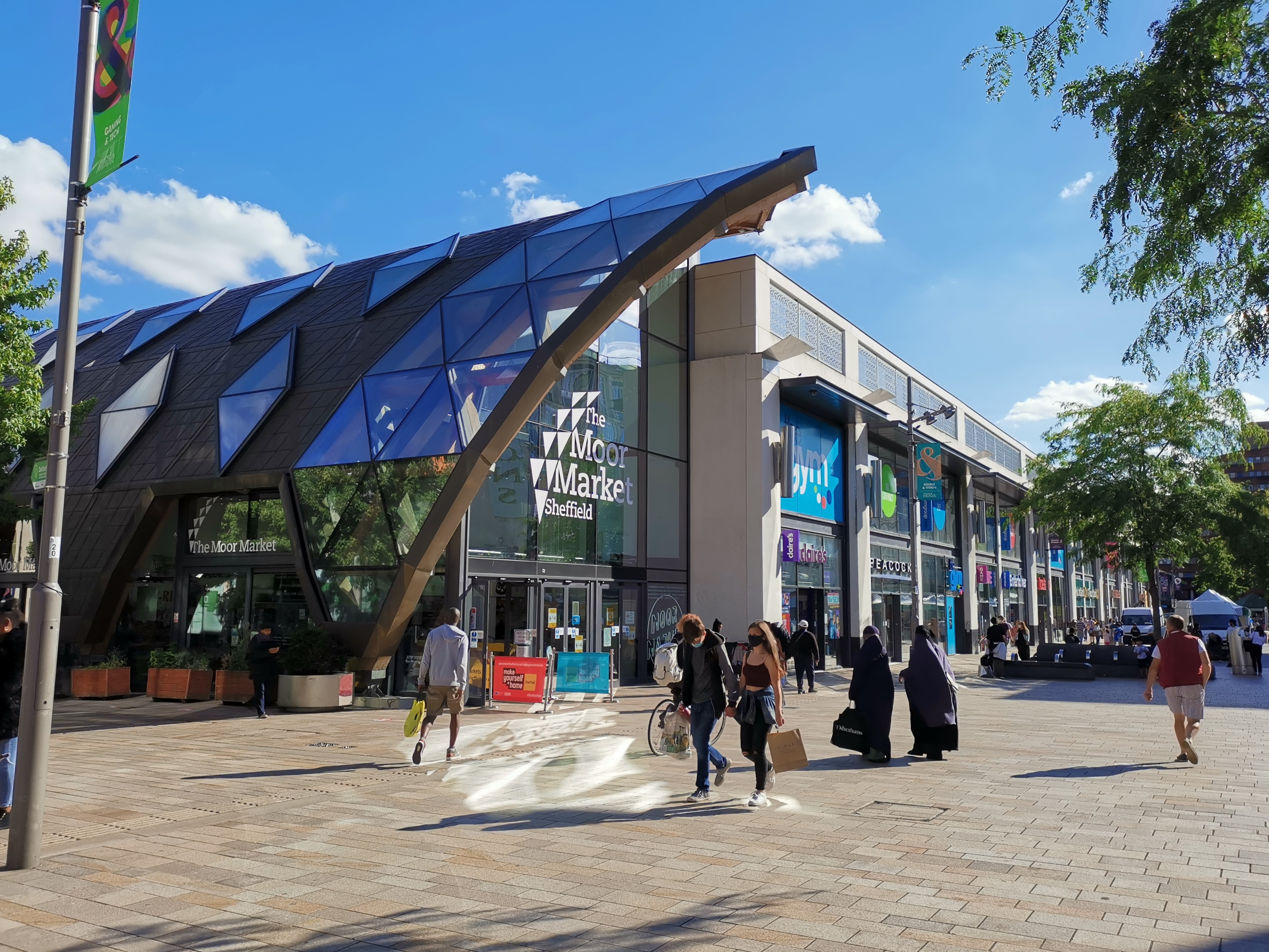
The Moor Market

A new retail and leisure development built on a large site adjacent to the former Debenhams department store opened in 2016. It includes a nine screen The Light cinema, a flagship Primark store, four additional shops, and seven restaurants. The Moor has seen many other high-street fashion retailers move from Fargate, such as Next, New Look, H&M (although they have kept their Fargate store open) and River Island.

=== New retail quarter/Seventone ===
Originally due for completion in the early 2010s, NRQ/Sevenstone was to become be a major shopping/living area adding 250 new shops to the city centre. As of 2008 the project remained on hold due to the economic downturn and Sheffield City Council finally dropped developer Hammerson in July 2013 after no firm agreement for recommencement of the project could be reached. Sheffield City Council has announced that it will eventually take a new scheme forward using a combination of private and public funds. No firm time-scales for the new project have been formally released as of April 2014, although plans were expected to be released to the public in spring 2014.

=== Riverside ===
The Riverside Exchange is a new, large business district in the north of the city centre and is home to organisations such as Irwin Mitchell and the UK Border Agency.

=== West Street/Devonshire quarter ===
The West End district of the city centre is home to many independent shops, bars and coffee shops - particularly catering for the large student population in the area. Devonshire Green, a small landscaped district park which hosted the main stage of the annual Sheffield Tramlines Festival from 2009 until 2014 as well as outdoor cinema screenings throughout the summer. Devonshire Quarter Plan.

== See also ==
- Districts of Sheffield
- Sheffield city region
- Listed buildings in Sheffield City Centre
