= New Era Square =

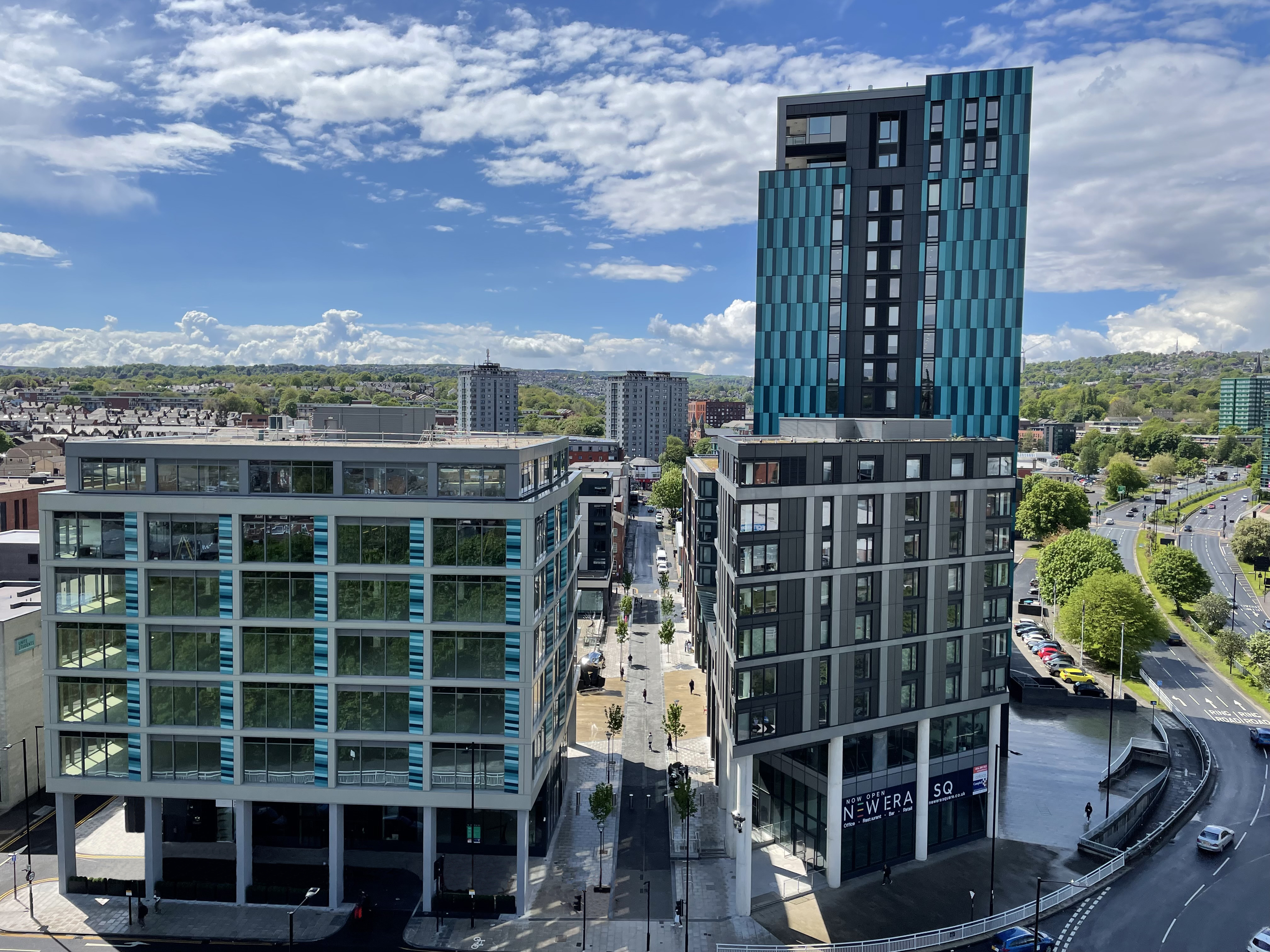
- A view of the square
- Interactive map of the New Era Square area

General information
- Type: Residential
- Location: Sheffield, South Yorkshire, England
- Coordinates: 53°22′20.7″N 1°28′25.9″W
- Construction started: 09 November 2015
- Completed: Completion in August 2020
- Cost: £65 million STG

Height
- Height: 65.9 m (216 ft)

Technical details
- Floor count: 21 storeys

Design and construction
- Architect: Hadfield Cawkwell Davidson Ltd
- Developer: New Era Development (UK) Ltd
- Services engineer: Silcock Dawson & Partners
- Main contractor: Bowmer & Kirkland Ltd

Website
- www.ned-uk.com

New Era Square is a development project located next to St Mary's Gate roundabout on the Inner Ring Road of Sheffield City Centre, South Yorkshire, England. The development fronts onto the corner of St Mary's Gate and Bramall Lane, (home to the grounds of Sheffield United Football Club) in the Highfield area of the city. The scheme is also close to London Road, which has been long known for its large multi-cultural and Chinese community.

The project was developed by New Era Development (UK) Ltd, a private limited company that was registered with Companies House on 11 October 2013. The development has been dubbed "Sheffield's Chinatown" and "Sheffield's very own version of New York's Times Square" by the local media and has drawn the attention of the UK National press.

== Development ==
The New Era Square development was conceived by UK-Chinese Sheffield businessman Jerry Cheung, who is prominent in the local community as a property developer, restaurant chain owner, Chair of Sheffield Chinese Community Centre and the winner of a 'Special Recognition' Sheffield Business Award in 2016. The project is being funded entirely by inbound Chinese investment into Sheffield, the numerous benefits of which have been reported by the local and business press.

The architectural design for the project was undertaken by Sheffield-based architects firm Hadfield Cawkwell Davidson Ltd. The initial planning application for a development at Boston Street, including "Demolition of existing buildings and erection of 3 buildings" was received by Sheffield City Council in Autumn 2014, including plans for a 21-storey tower. The application was granted conditionally for the demolition of existing buildings and the erection of a mixed-use development of 3 buildings comprising an oriental cash and carry supermarket, retail and commercial space, business accommodation and student apartments.

Since the initial planning application, planning approval was also requested for minor changes to the design scheme, including changes to the proposed office space in Phase 2 of the scheme. The proposed development, currently under construction (spring 2017), now consists of 5 blocks. The finished square incorporated green roofs, outdoor lighting, leisure facilities for tenants and a pedestrianised plaza open for public use, with landscaping by local Sheffield company Weddles.

Work began on the construction of the development in late 2015, launching with a ground-breaking ceremony, for which event investors flew into the UK from China. The Derbyshire-based company Bowmer & Kirkland (B&K) are the building contractors working on the scheme.

The student accommodation, which includes studio apartments ranging in size in the first building of the development, is currently being let by the locally based Omnia Space agency and the first building opened to student residents in September 2017.

== Facilities ==
New Era Square is home to a number of facilities, including food outlets, office buildings, and purpose-built student accommodation.

=== Restaurants ===
New Era Square's restaurants largely consist of independent eateries, with many serving East Asian cuisines. Units include:

- OISOI Bar & Restaurant
- Shuyo Korean Restaurant
- A Journey to Chengdu
- Tiny Shop
- No.1 Grill
- PBZ
- Erbin Chinese Bento Buffet x Chinese Skillet Grill
- Lykke
- Panenka Bar & Grill
- Selena Cocktail Bar & Kitchen
- Yum Yum Bites

=== Other Facilities ===
Other facilities located in New Era Square include Xing Xing Hair Salon, Baby Bump Sheffield, Steel City General Practice, KH Oriental Food Company and student accommodation platform UniHomes, as well as a number of private student halls.
