= Beehive Works =

Purpose-built factory in Sheffield

Coordinates: 53.3757°N 1.4793°W

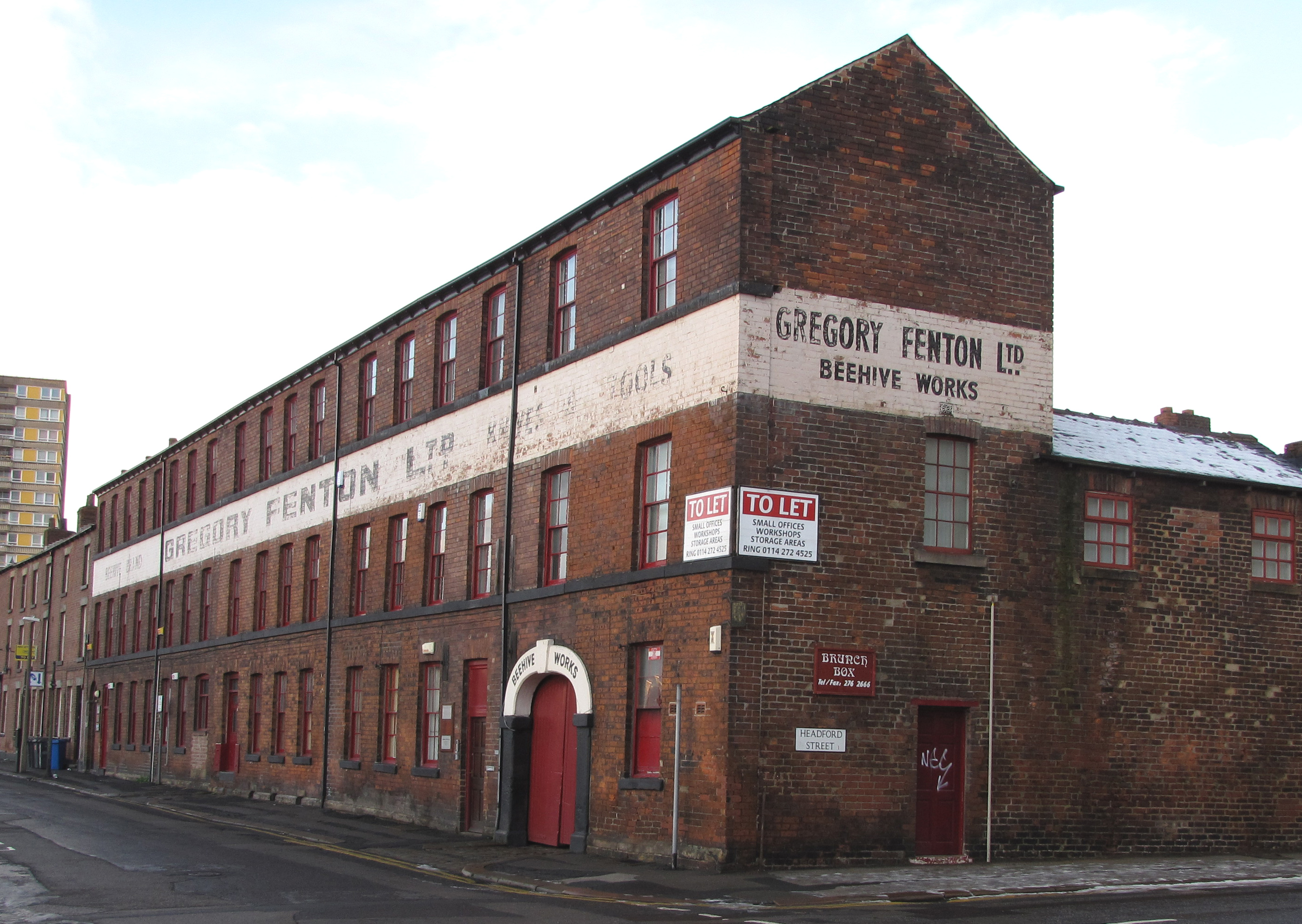
Seen from the junction of Milton Street and Headford Street.

The Beehive Works are a purpose-built cutlery works located on Milton Street in the Devonshire Quarter area of Sheffield city centre. The works were built in stages in the second half of the 19th century and are designated as a Grade II* listed building with English Heritage stating that they are of special architectural and historic interest as an examples of buildings associated with Sheffield's metal manufacturing and metal working trades. The works stand adjacent to the Taylor's Eye Witness Works and together they make Milton Street one of the best places to gain an impression of Sheffield’s former cutlery industry.

== History ==
It is thought that the first phase of building took place in the late 1850s or the early 1860s. The buildings were initially known as the Milton Works, with B. Mathewman and Sons being the first known occupants. The Works expanded quickly during the 1880s and 1890s with the addition of more grinding wheels and forges; the steam power plant was also enlarged to drive this extra machinery. By 1888 the Atkinson Brothers had taken over the works as manufacturers of steel, cutlery, files and electro plate products. The Atkinsons had considerable success as a company using the trade mark "In Mind". They exhibited at the 1894 Antwerp World's fair, becoming a registered company on the stock exchange in 1897.

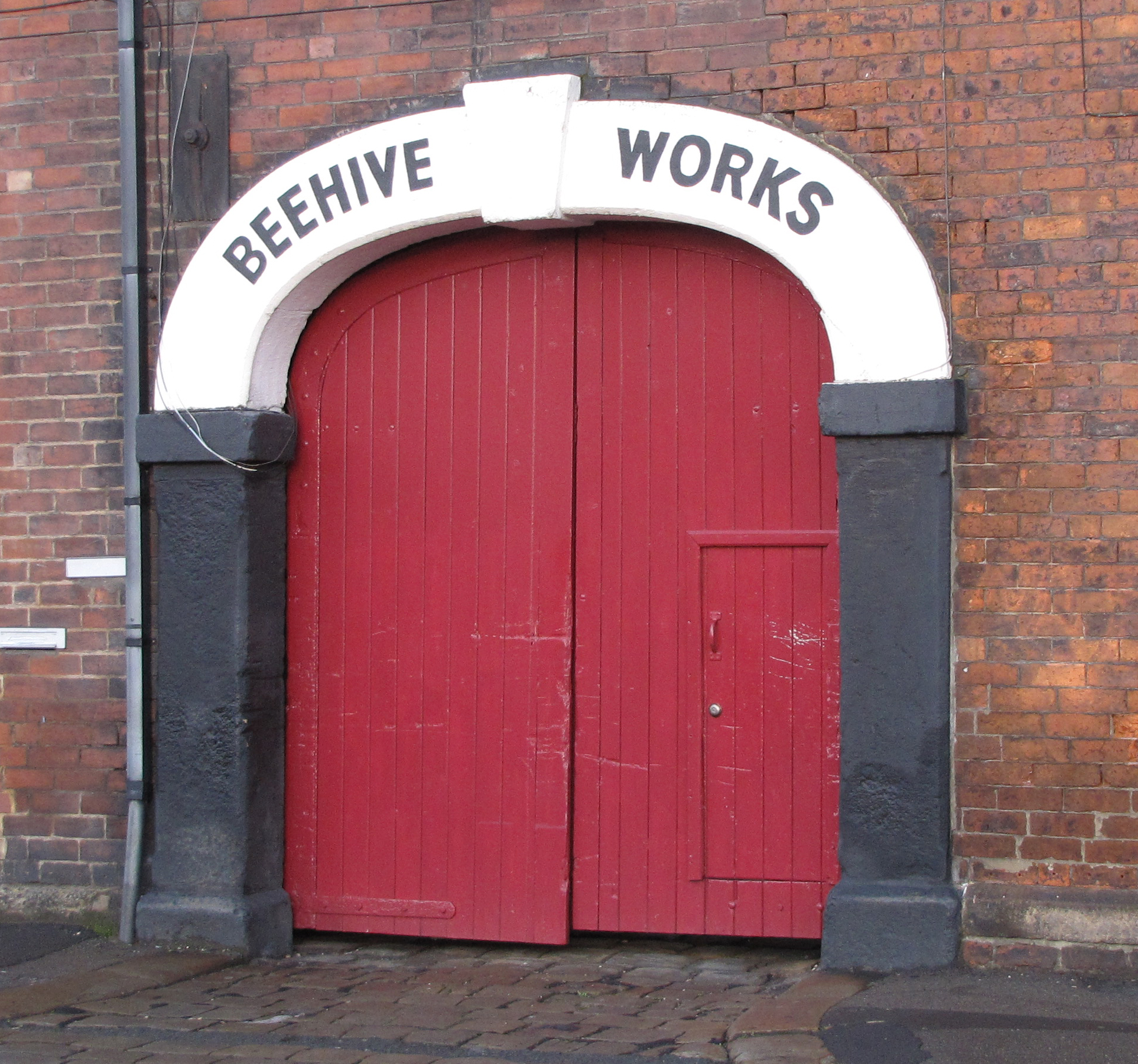
The entrance to the courtyard on Milton Street.

Atkinson Brothers were resident at the Beehive Works well into the 20th century. Later the works were taken over by the cutlery manufacturers Gregory Fenton Ltd, a company established in 1968 by the amalgamation of the Gregory Brothers and Joseph Fenton firms. Gregory Fenton Ltd are still resident at the Beehive Works although in a much reduced capacity, their name is still displayed extensively on the frontage of the building (see photograph). Today the works have been divided up into small offices, workshops and storage areas which are rented out. Among the businesses using the Beehive Works at present (in addition to Gregory Fenton Ltd) are: Exposed Magazine (an entertainment and listings guide for Sheffield), Hardy Transactions Ltd (corporate finance advisors), the Brunch Box (take away food outlet) and P. Hobson Ltd (metal finishing services).

== Architecture ==
The works frontage stretching along Milton Street is eighteen bays long and three storeys high with some cellars beneath street level. The building is constructed from red brick with ashlars dressing and a slate roof. The windows are mostly 12-pane sash. There is a painted sign reading "Beehive brand / Gregory Fenton Ltd. / knives and tools" between the first and second floors. This continues round the corner onto Headford Street and read "Gregory Fenton Ltd. / Beehive Works". An arched doubled door cart entrance with the words "Beehive Works" above leads off Milton Street into the internal courtyards. The courtyards include four- and three-storey workshop ranges with large casement windows on the lower floors. Steps from the courtyard give separate access to the first/-floor workshops and indicates that they were intended for use by a number of little mesters.
