= West Bar Quarter =

West Bar
- Interactive map of the West Bar area

General information
- Status: Under Development
- Type: Residential/office
- Location: Exchange Riverside, Sheffield, South Yorkshire, England
- Coordinates: 53.386745°N 1.468499°W
- Construction started: 2021
- Completed: 2023
- Cost: £300 million

Technical details
- Floor area: 1,000,000 sq ft (93,000 m^{2})

Design and construction
- Architect: 5Plus Architects
- Developer: Urbo (West Bar) Limited

The West Bar scheme is a £300 million regeneration scheme in Sheffield, South Yorkshire, England on the edge of the City centre planned by Urbo (West Bar) Limited.

The scheme will deliver a large-scale, mixed use development which will provide large footprint buildings across seven acres of land.

When complete, West Bar will be transformed into approaching 1M sq.ft. of new space in a vibrant mixed-use environment. When completed, in addition to offices, it will also contain retail, leisure, hotel and living space and integrated parking.

== Masterplan and Vision ==
The regeneration of West Bar aims to regenerate a previously under-utilised part of Sheffield City centre and bring back to life an important gateway site adjacent to Sheffield's city centre ring road.

The development masterplan for West Bar contains 10 building plots which are mixed use in nature. The plots allow for a range of uses as part of the outline planning consent however, principally will be focussed on office and residential uses allowing for ground floor retail / leisure uses. The layout has been conceived with flexibility in mind in terms of use, exact scale, design and the ability to combine them as larger buildings.

The plots are a starting point for a flexible approach to providing fantastic space for businesses with varying size and use requirements from approximately 10,000 sq.ft.

== Legal & General ==
In April 2020, Legal & General, working with the developers Urbo (West Bar) Limited and Sheffield City Council, agreed to fund the first phase of the West Bar scheme. This involves the funding of circa £150 million of investment to Sheffield and will see the delivery of a 100,000 sq ft office block, multi-storey car park and circa 368 apartments on the site.

This important deal represents a partnership between Legal & General, Sheffield City Council and Urbo (West Bar) Ltd – the joint venture between Urbo Regeneration and Peveril Securities (the development arm of the Bowmer and Kirkland Group).
