= Heart of the City II =

Mixed-use development in Sheffield, England

Coordinates: 53.377°N 1.479°W

Heart of the City II is a mixed-use development under construction in Sheffield city centre, England between the Devonshire Quarter and The Moor Gateway. The project was previously given the marketing name Sevenstone, prior to Hammerson, the developer, being dropped from the project in December 2013 with Sheffield City Council seeking new developers.

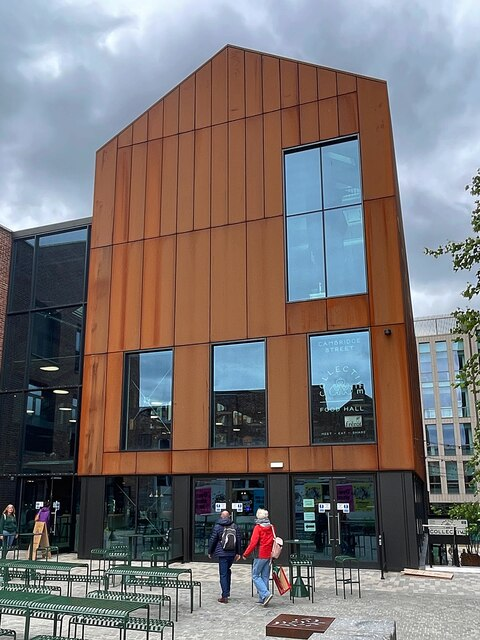
Cambridge Street Collective food hall

The first phase, consisting of restaurants, shops and offices opened in 2020. The second phase was largely completed in mid 2024.

== Overview ==
Located to the west of Pinstone Street, between Barkers Pool and Moorhead, Heart of the City II covers a 7-hectare (17-acre) site in the heart of Sheffield and involves a major re-design of this part of the city.

The £470 million scheme features mostly new buildings, with some older ones retained and refurbished. Roughly 250,000-square-foot (23,000 m^{2}) of retail and leisure space will be created as a result of the project, along with 500,000-square-foot (46,000 m^{2}) of workspace, 30,000-square-foot (2,800 m^{2}) of cultural space and 420 new homes. A new park, named Pound's Park after Sheffield's first chief fire officer John Pound, was created on the site of the former Sheffield Central fire station in May 2023 and features a water play area, a playground and a climbing wall. A new food hall, on the corner between Cambridge Street and Wellington Street is also part of the scheme.

== History ==
=== Concept and original scheme ===
Investigations into the rapid decline of Sheffield city centre from the mid-1980s led the Sheffield Development Corporation and Sheffield City Council to jointly commission Hillier Parker and the Oxford Institute of Retail Management to undertake a study of the region in 1994, and to recommend a strategy for regeneration of the city centre. The study noted the decline in status of the city centre and recommended a long-term strategy for the unification of The Moor and Fargate through a major retail development.

This concept was developed and in 2000 the New Retail Quarter site was identified by a City Centre Masterplan, commissioned by Sheffield 1, the city's urban regeneration company. In 2001, Hammerson was selected as preferred developer through conducted jointly by Sheffield 1 and the council.

Hammerson submitted an Outline Planning Application in October 2005, seeking permission for a mixed use development consisting of refurbishment of use of existing buildings and erection of buildings for retail, housing, a night club, a health and fitness club, and multi-storey car parking. Amended planning applications were submitted in May and July 2006.

Enabling works (that is, providing the gas, water, electrical and telephone infrastructure) began in March 2006 on the roads surrounding the new site, including Division Street, Moore Street, Charter Row and others.

The Outline Planning Application was approved by the Council in August 2006. The Secretary of State confirmed by letters dated 25 September 2006 and 9 October 2006 that he did not wish to intervene, and that the decision as to whether to grant outline planning permission and the associated listed building consents would therefore remain with the council. The Section 106 Agreement was completed in November 2006 and outline planning permission and associated listed building consents were issued that month.

In October 2007, developers Hammerson unveiled the official marketing name for the New Retail Quarter as Sevenstone. The branding was welcomed by business and political leaders in Sheffield.

In March 2008, a three-day public exhibition displayed the plans for Sevenstone in Sheffield City Centre. Local press described the reactions of Sheffield citizens to the plans as 'mixed'.

=== Collapse of original scheme ===
On 29 January 2009, the Sheffield Star reported that the project had been put on hold indefinitely, based on an interview with the city's regeneration company who retracted the statement the following day.

Despite the uncertainty, the demolition of the Wellington Street fire station, began in December 2009, with agreement that the site would be used as a temporary car park until work begun.

On 17 June 2010, the Coalition Government, just weeks after its formation, announced the suspension of £12 million of central funding toward the project. Nevertheless, on 15 March 2011, Sheffield City Council announced that it was taking out a £10 million loan to kick-start the stalled development. The money plus a further £10 million contributed by the developers Hammerson would be used to part finance the compulsory purchase of all the empty shops and land needed to build the scheme. As a result, the Sevenstone scheme was expected to start in late 2013 or early 2014.

However, the project continued to stall and in March 2012, John Lewis announced that it was no longer seeking to move from its current store into the Sevenstone development.

Sheffield City Council provided an update in March 2013 claiming:

Sheffield City Council, Hammerson plc and John Lewis Partnership remain committed to delivering on the city's Sevenstone retail project.

The three partners have accelerated discussions by which the Sevenstone retail led project can be brought forward for delivery in Sheffield City Centre. All parties have been focused on a new scheme layout and have agreed the location of a new anchor John Lewis store.

It is anticipated that the new scheme will include up to 700,000 sq ft of retail with extensive food and entertainment venues along with a multi storey car park and high quality public realm throughout. Positive negotiations are ongoing for a revised scheme layout. It is still hoped to start on site in 2014/15.

On 29 July 2013 it was announced that developer Hammerson had been axed by Sheffield City Council.

=== 2014 revised scheme ===
On 10 October 2013, Sheffield City Council announced that it had begun the formal process to "end their relationship with Hammerson". However, the statement also claimed that:

The Council aims to deliver a New Retail Quarter that will fundamentally improve the retail offer in the City Centre, by providing modern flexible retail spaces and attracting quality fashion retailers. This will make a significant step change and will boost Sheffield City Centre's status back up the retail ranking index.

The statement also claimed that the project would be ready to take to the market place in spring 2014 and was on programme with a target for completion during 2018/19.

In March 2015, more detailed plans of the Sheffield Retail Quarter development designed by Leonard Design Architects were revealed, with a focus on introducing "aspirational and contemporary retailers" along Cross Burgess Street and Pinstone Street, concentrated around an anchor store. The new schedule aimed to have the quarter 80% complete by 2019, with the end objective of having all phases completed by 2021.

Work on the project began in 2017, which saw Grosvenor House Hotel demolished and replaced with a new HSBC office with retail units at ground level.

=== Heart of the City II ===
The New Retail Quarter project was later renamed Heart of the City II and unveiled in March 2018. The plan was more mixed-use than the previous, with hospitality and offices playing a major role alongside retail in the development. A hotel and a food hall were also announced as part of the project. Unlike previous plans, the John Lewis building in Barker's Pool was to be retained as well as Victorian frontages along Pinstone Street. An expected completion date of 2024 for the full project was announced.

== Sources ==
- Make it in Sheffeld
- Sheffield City Council
- Hammerson
- Sheffield1 Regeneration (requires flash)
- Yorkshire Forward
