= Devonshire Quarter =

Area in Sheffield, England

Coordinates: 53.379393°N 1.478595°W

The Devonshire Quarter is an area in the centre of Sheffield, England. Its heart is the Division Street and Devonshire Street shopping areas, known for their small independent shops and variety of pubs and bars. The district also has The Forum shopping centre and Devonshire Green, one of the largest open areas in central Sheffield.

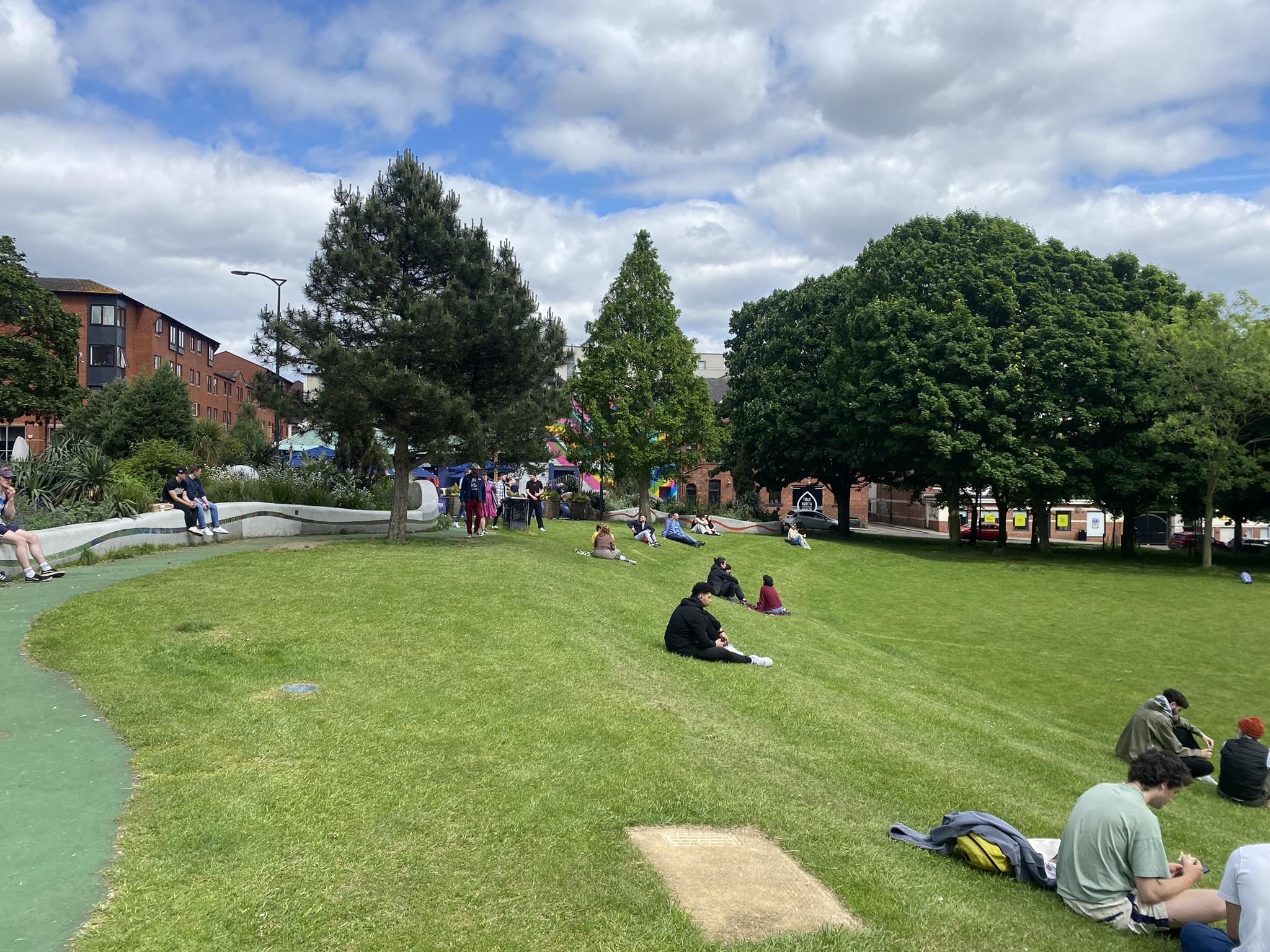
Devonshire Green

To the west, the quarter is bounded by Sheffield's inner ring road and includes a small social housing estate. Glossop Road and West Street are to the north, Carver Street to the east, and Moore Street and Charter Row to the south-east.

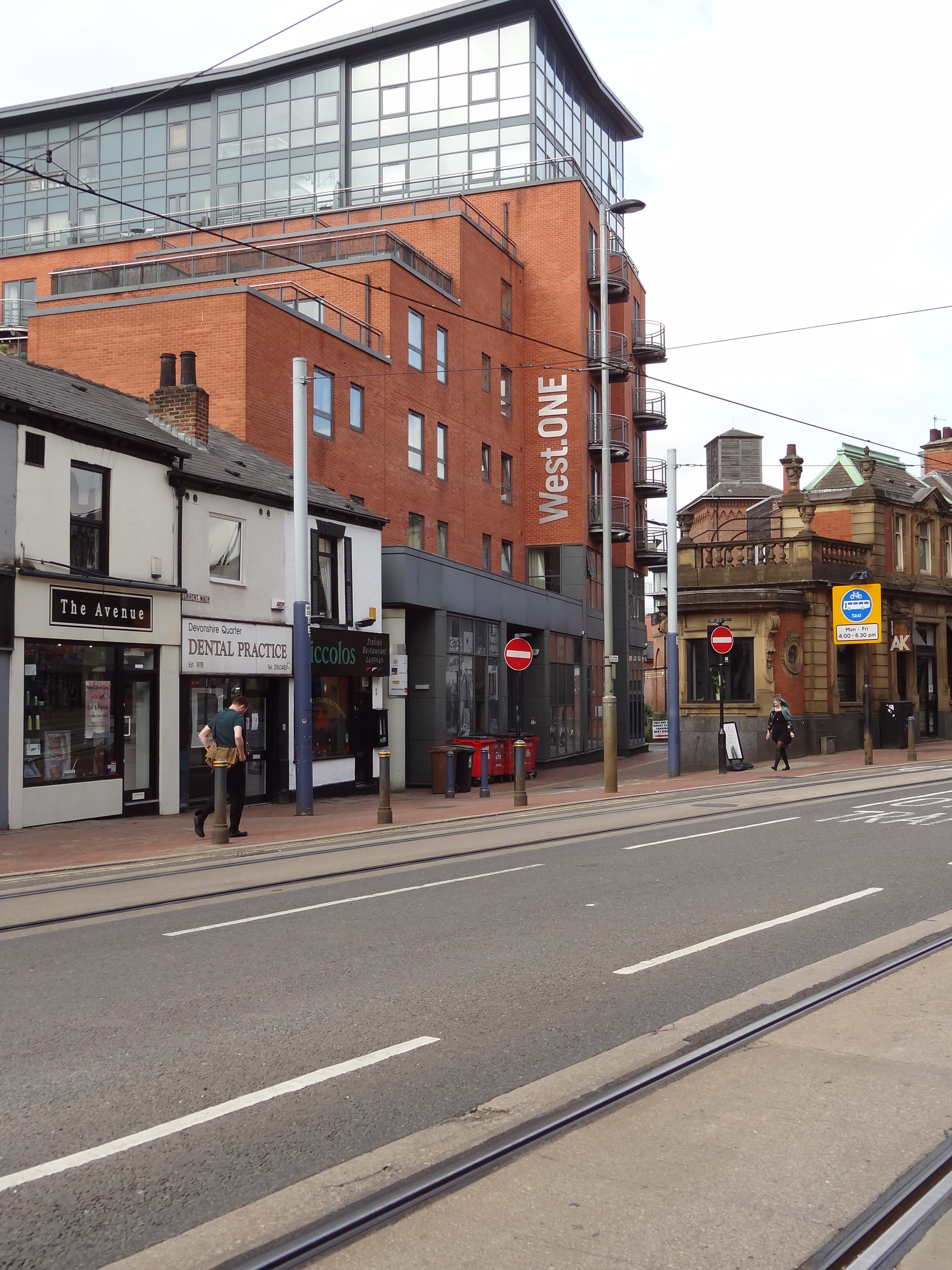
West One

== Future ==
The Quarter is designed to create an urban village of city living and retail, with the New Retail Quarter based mostly within the Devonshire Quarter.

== Significant historic buildings ==
1. Taylor's Eye Witness Works
2. Beehive Works
3. Wharncliffe Fireclay Works
4. Taylor's Ceylon Works
5. Aberdeen Works, Trafalgar Works, Select and Kangaroo Works
6. Springfield Board School
7. Carver Street Methodist Chapel
8. Facade of Mount Zion Chapel
9. Original developments on Division Street, Canning and Gell Street
10. Former Glossop Road Baths
11. Sheffield Central Fire Station
12. Workshops at No 23, Carver Street
13. National School at No 35, Carver Street
14. St Matthew's Church

== Character areas ==
1. West Street
2. Wilkinson Street and Gell Street
3. Devonshire Green
4. Holly Street/Westfield Terrace/Trafalgar Street
5. Milton Street
