= Upperthorpe, Sheffield =

Area of Sheffield, England

Coordinates: 53.390°N 1.487°W

Upperthorpe
- Location within South Yorkshire
- Metropolitan borough: Sheffield
- Metropolitan county: South Yorkshire
- Region: Yorkshire and the Humber
- Country: England
- Sovereign state: United Kingdom
- Post town: SHEFFIELD
- Postcode district: S6
- Dialling code: 0114
- Police: South Yorkshire
- Fire: South Yorkshire
- Ambulance: Yorkshire
- UK Parliament: Sheffield Central

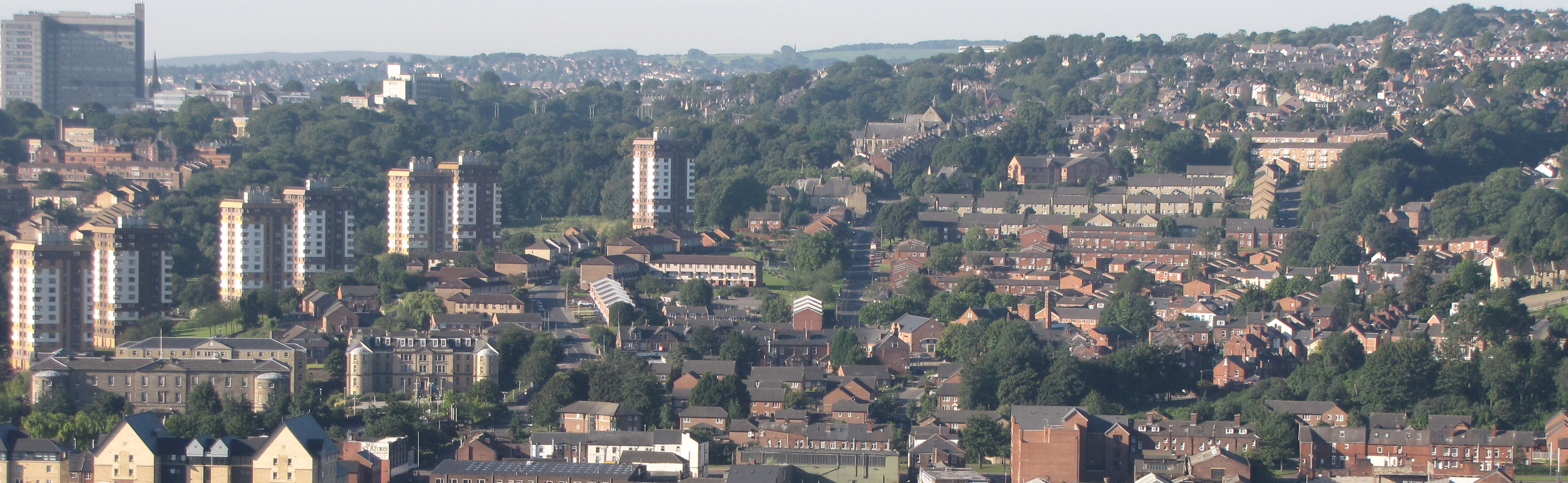
General view of Upperthorpe from Parkwood Springs

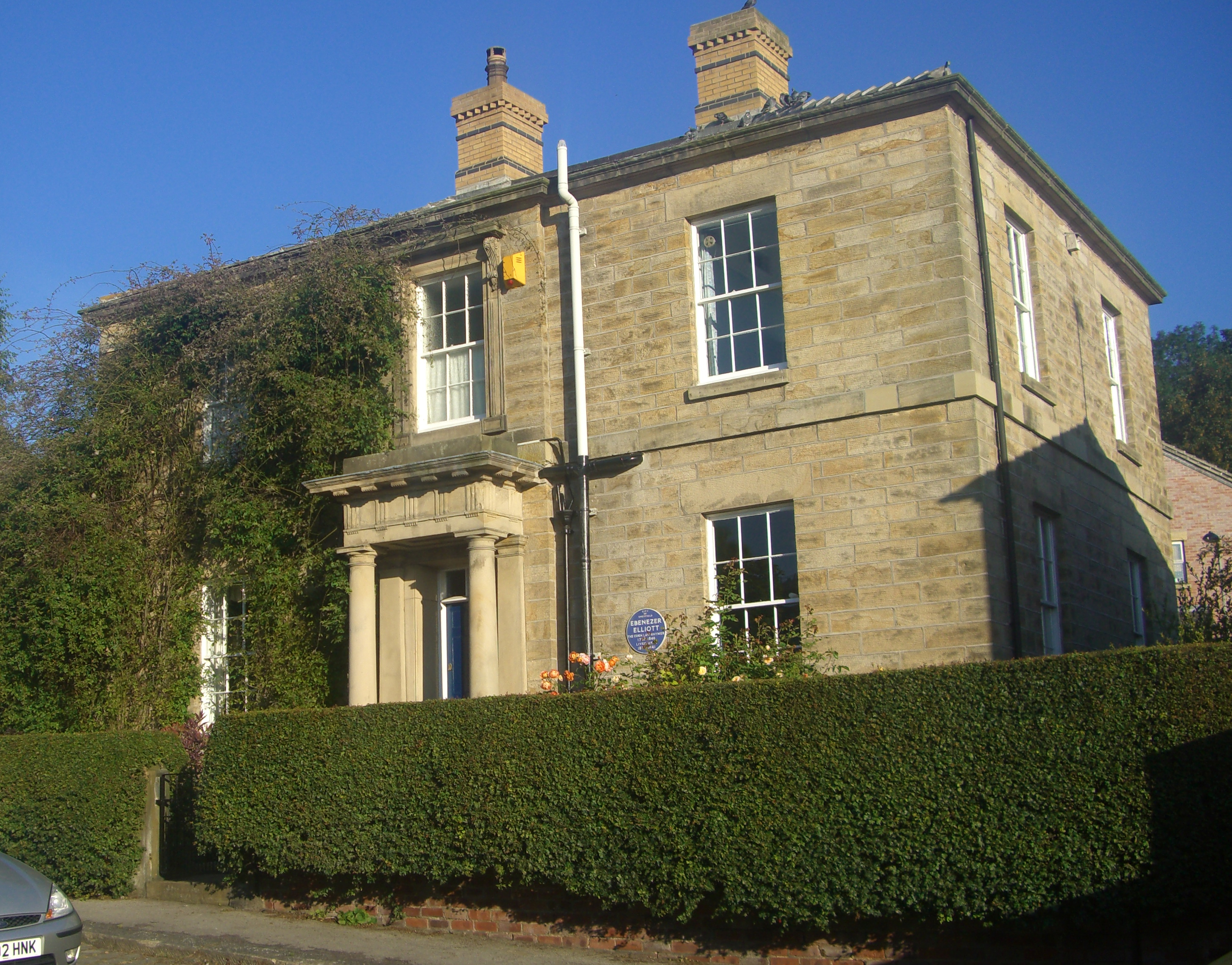
Upperthorpe Villa, 22 Blake Grove Road

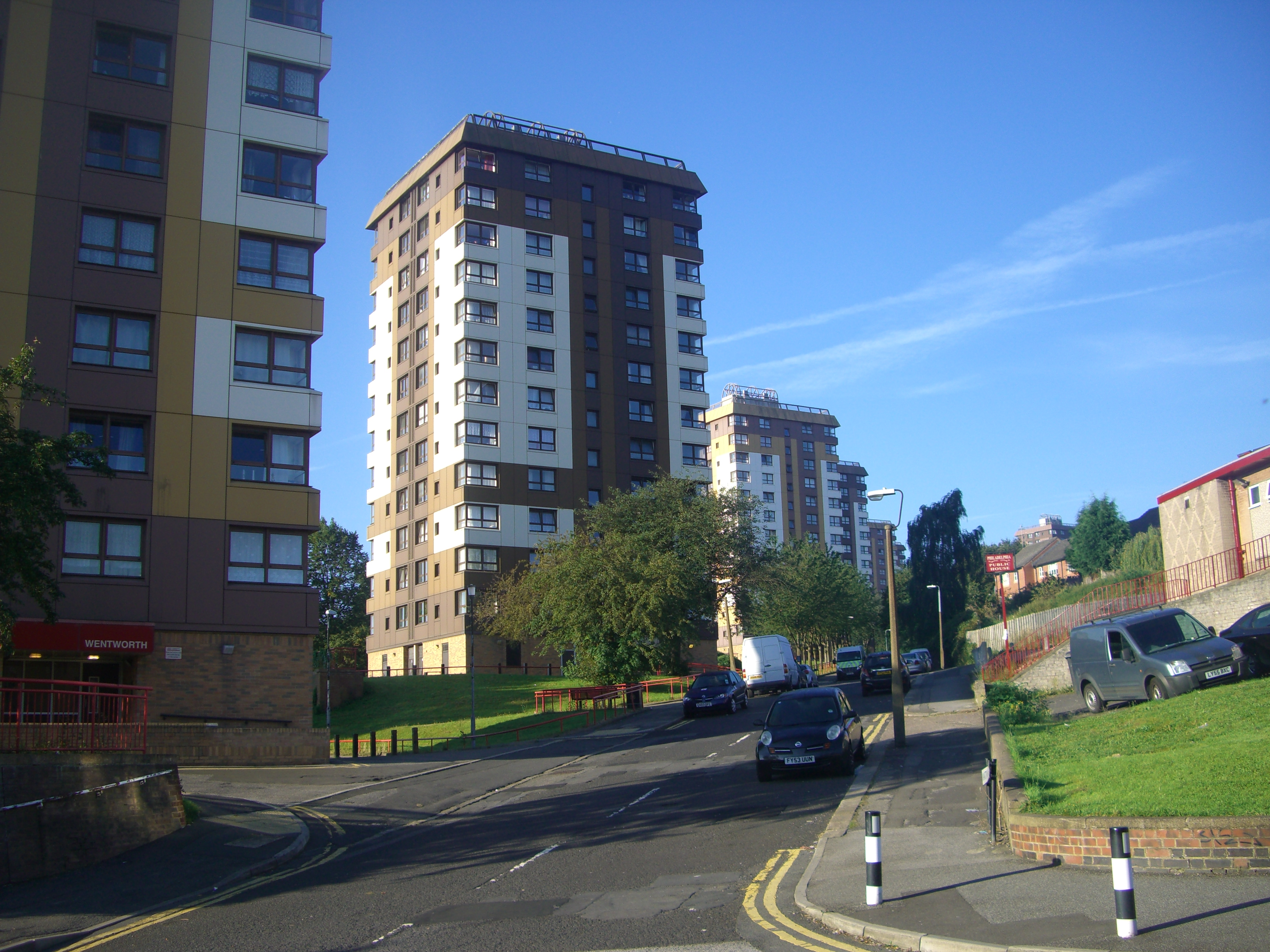
Some of the seven tower blocks.

Upperthorpe is a part of the City of Sheffield, England. It lies 1.2 miles (2 km) west of the city centre. The area falls within the Walkley ward of the City. It is an area of residential housing and is bounded by Walkley to the north, Crookes to the west and Netherthorpe to the south.

== History ==
The date of the first settlement in the Upperthorpe area is not clear; the name itself is a combination of the Danish word "thorpe" meaning "outlying farmstead" and a surname which was the Middle English word for a cooper. This means that the settlement was founded at a time when both Viking and Old English words had been integrated into local speech giving a founding date in the 9th or 10th century. By 1383 the settlement was known as Hoperthorpe which gradually evolved into Upperthorpe over the centuries. By the middle of the 16th century, tanning had become a major industry within Upperthorpe with the Rawsons, an ancient Hallamshire family, setting up tanning pits in the area. Their business flourished over the years and they also established tanneries at nearby Walkley and Philadelphia. The industry started to falter in the 19th century and eventually lost out to more established tanning areas in Walsall and Leeds.

Upperthorpe was the location of the first reservoir to supply water to Sheffield. In 1712 John Goodwin and Robert Littlewood were appointed by the town trustees and the Duke of Norfolk to pipe water from springs at the White House, Upperthorpe to Townhead in the centre of Sheffield. In 1737 they were joined by Joshua Matthewman and the first of several reservoirs was built. By the late 1780s the water from the Upperthorpe dams was insufficient to supply the growing town of Sheffield and a new chain of reservoirs was built at Crookesmoor. Upperthorpe remained mainly a farming settlement with the first sign of the encroachment of Sheffield town being the building of Sheffield Royal Infirmary on Upperthorpe Meadows, then half a mile outside the town. The Infirmary opened for patients on 4 October 1797 and received a very good supply of clean water from the Spring Vale stream which flowed down from the vicinity of Crookes village; the stream continued to supply the hospital until 1861.

By the 1820s Upperthorpe was becoming "a pleasant and favourable residential district". In 1826 John Blake, who was to become Master Cutler in 1831, built Upperthorpe Villa, a stone built house with porch at 22 Blake Grove Road; the house still stands today and is a grade II listed building. The nearby Blake Street, the steep road which leads to Walkley and the Blake Hotel public house are named after John Blake who died in the cholera outbreak of 1832. With a gradient of 16.6° Blake Street is the third steepest residential street England. Ebenezer Elliott, the Corn Law Rhymer lived at Upperthorpe Villa between 1834 and 1841, a fact marked by a blue plaque on the building.

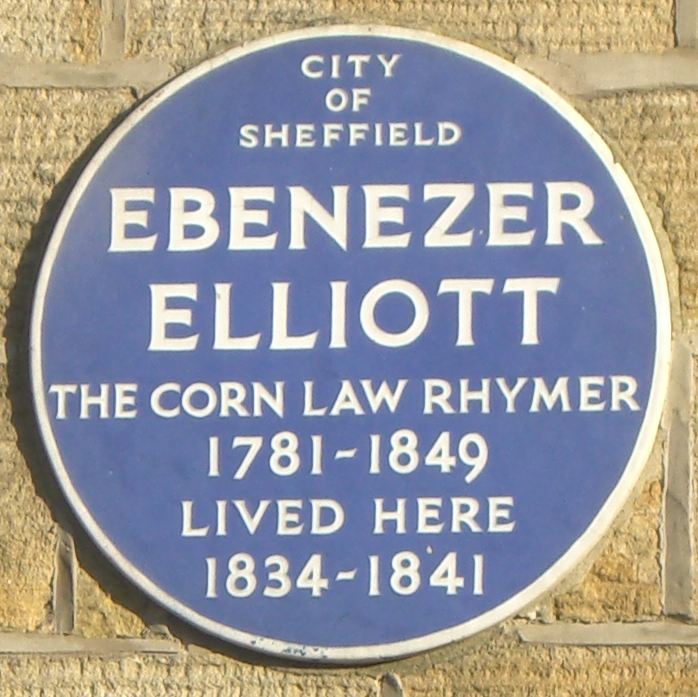
Blue plaque on Upperthorpe Villa.

House building continued in the area in the late 1840s with the Birkendale Freehold Land Society building a development of detached and semi detached villas on an area of over nine acres. Each villa had a plot of land of one rood (quarter of an acre) and were occupied mainly by steel industry craftsmen and their families with the original occupants including scissors, spring knife and cutlery manufacturers. Today the Birkendale neighbourhood is a conservation area with 65 houses in total. Sir Stuart Goodwin (1886–1969) founder of the Neepsend Steel and Tool Corporation was born at 120 Upperthorpe; he was one of Sheffield's top industrialists in the inter war period. He later became one of the City's most renowned patrons, funding Sheffield's Christmas illuminations for many years and the Goodwin Sports Centre, he is commemorated by the Goodwin Fountain in the Peace Gardens.

=== Modern developments ===
Upperthorpe underwent substantial redevelopment in the 1950s and 1960s and again in the 1980s, although an area of traditional housing survived in the area around Daniel Hill, Blake Street and Birkendale, as well a small historic core area featuring the 19th century public baths and library. Seven tower blocks were built in Martin Street and Oxford Street between 1959 and 1961, these had 12 residential floors and are named Wentworth, Adelphi, Martin, Burlington, Bond, Albion and Oxford. The blocks were re-clad between 1993 and 1996 in a brown and white colour scheme by local contractors Henry Boot PLC at a cost of £7 million. After the late sixties redevelopment, a recreation area, known as The Ponderosa was created next to the tower blocks on the site of demolished terraced houses.

==== Kelvin Flats ====
The Kelvin Flats were constructed in 1965 on Infirmary Road; this was a massive and radical development similar to Park Hill Flats. It consisted of two 13 storey deck access blocks containing 948 flats. The two blocks consisted of four wide walks, informally known as "Streets in the Sky" and were named Edith Walk, Woollen Walk, Portland Walk and Kelvin Walk. The Kelvin had many social problems although a strong community spirit existed among the residents. In September 1992 Sheffield City Council announced the flats were to be knocked down with demolition taking place during 1995–6. The flats were replaced with an estate of conventional housing and the Philadelphia Green Space, a small recreation area featuring mature trees and wildlife.

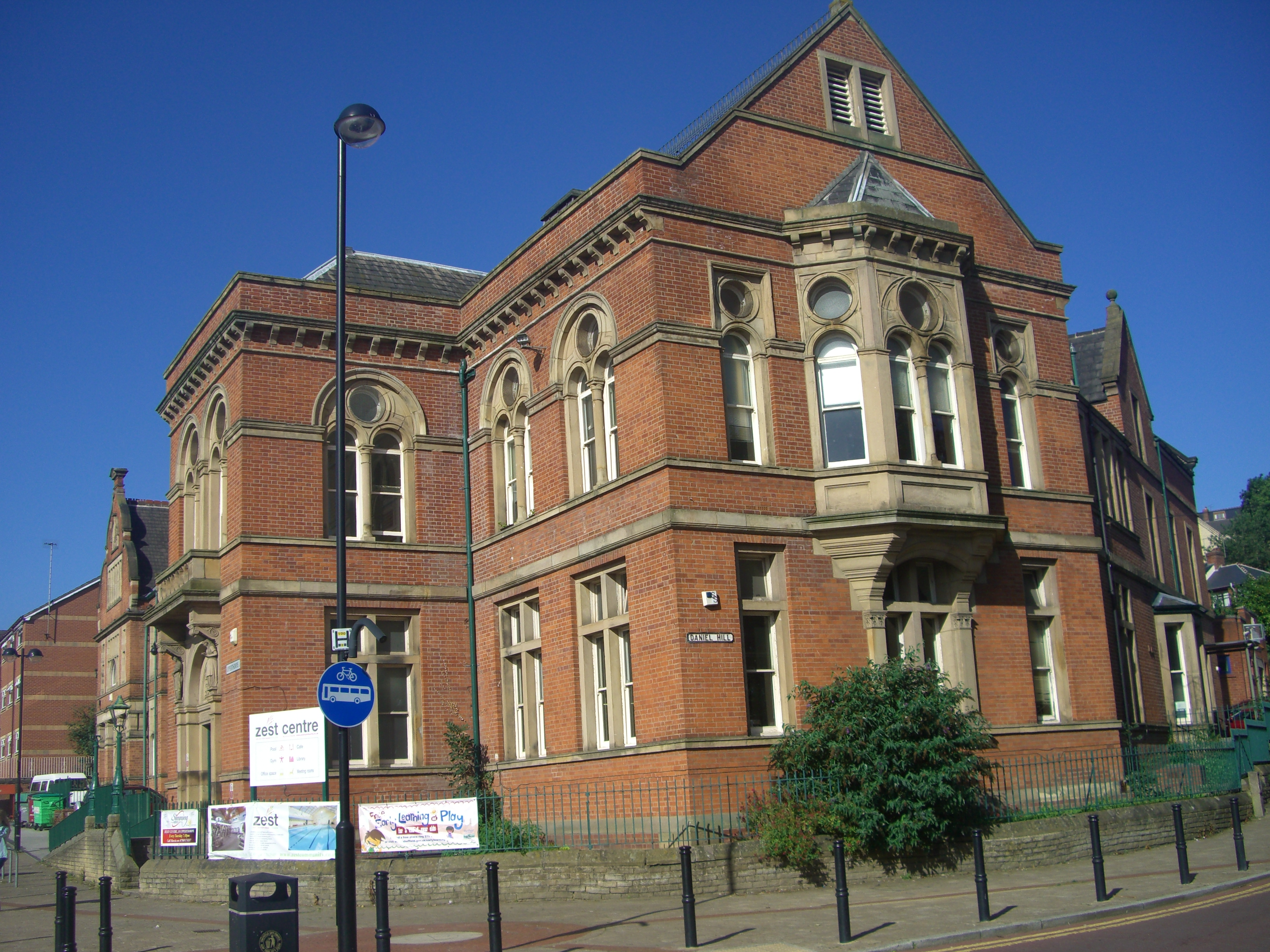
Upperthorpe Library

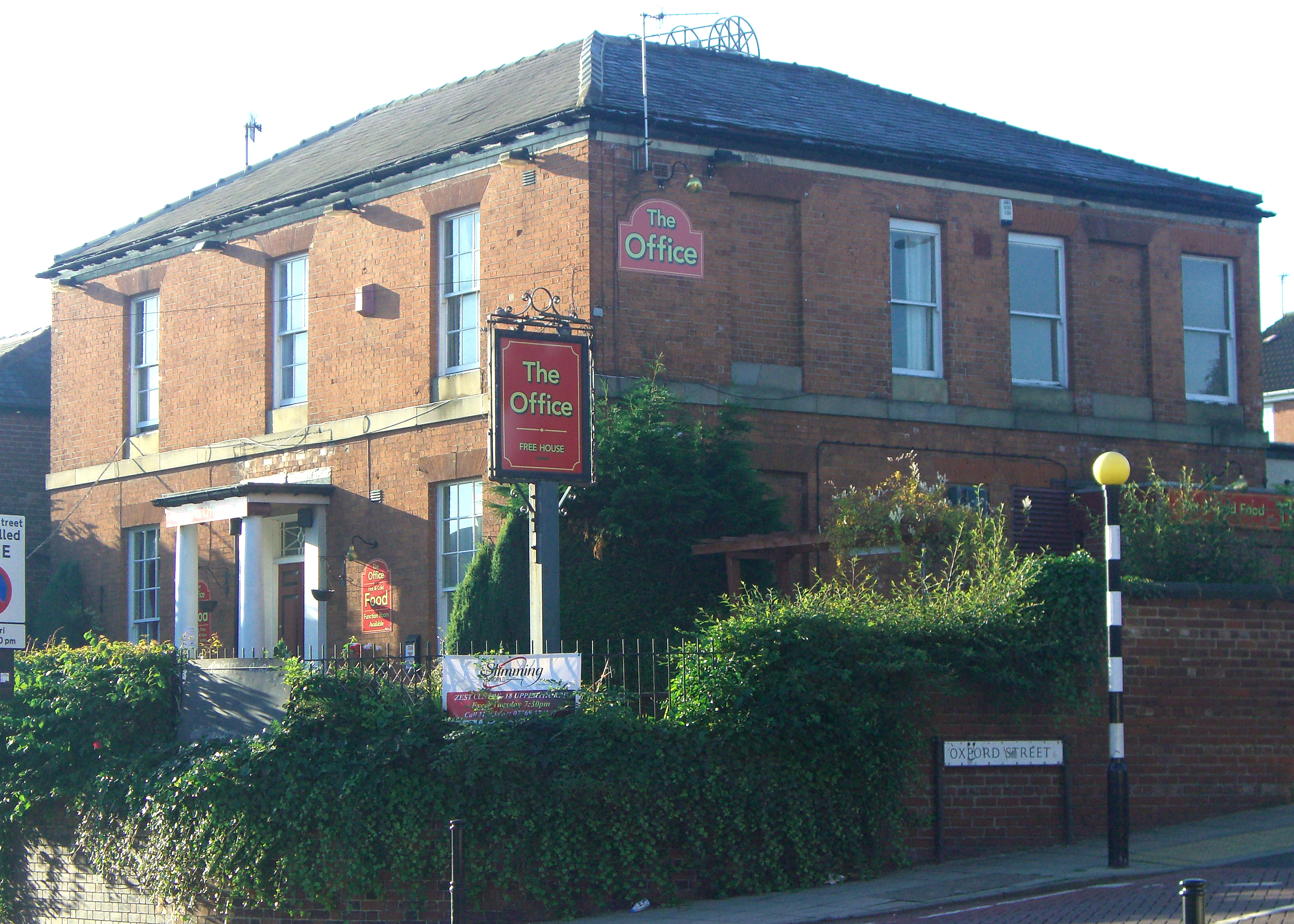
Eversley House, built in 1840, is now The Office public house

==== Other significant buildings ====
The Upperthorpe Public Library is a grade II listed building in the heart of Upperthorpe. It was constructed in 1874 by E.M. Gibbs. The Upperthorpe Baths stand next door to the library and date from 1895 and are by the architect Charles Wike. Both the library and the baths have since 2003 been part of the Upperthorpe Healthy Living Centre, now known as the Zest Centre. Apart from the library and the pool, the centre offers a gym, café, office space and meeting rooms. Eversley House at 115 Upperthorpe Road is also grade II listed; it was originally constructed in 1840 as a private residence. In 1919 it was donated to St. Philip's church by Mr. James Wing, a steel manufacturer, and used as community rooms. In later years the house has been used as a pub first being called The Eversley House, then The Moon and it is now known as The Office. The Sheffield Royal Infirmary closed in the 1980s; it has been renovated and renamed Heritage Park. It is used as office space. The complex comprises four buildings, Heritage House, Centenary House and The Roundhouse which were all part of the hospital. The fourth building, Victoria House is newly built and was constructed around 1990 and is located towards the south-western part of the grounds.

== Amenities ==
The only GP practice in the suburb is the Upperthorpe Medical Centre on Addy Street; 47% of the population are registered at this practice. There are no churches in the Upperthorpe area, the suburb being served by St Stephen's at Netherthorpe and St Barts on the Langsett estate. There are no public houses in the area. There is a small shopping area located centrally on Upperthorpe Road. There are no schools in the immediate area; Upperthorpe primary and infant school on Daniel Hill Street was closed down in the 1990s, demolished, and apartments built on the site in a similar style. Children now have to attend schools in either Netherthorpe, Walkley or Westways primary schools. Upperthorpe is a catchment area for Tapton Secondary School.

== Statistics ==
Upperthorpe has a population of 2,960 according to the 2001 census. A high percentage of properties in the suburb are flats, apartments or maisonettes and are rented from the local authority.
