= Weston Park, Sheffield =

Public park in Sheffield, England

Coordinates: 53.3820°N 1.4907°W

Weston Park is a public park with an area of just over 5 hectares in the City of Sheffield, South Yorkshire, England. It lies immediately west of the City Centre, alongside the Weston Park Museum. It is situated next to the University of Sheffield Library, Geography and Firth Court buildings, and across the road from Sheffield Children's Hospital. Along with Crookes Valley Park and The Ponderosa it is one of the three Crookesmoor parks.

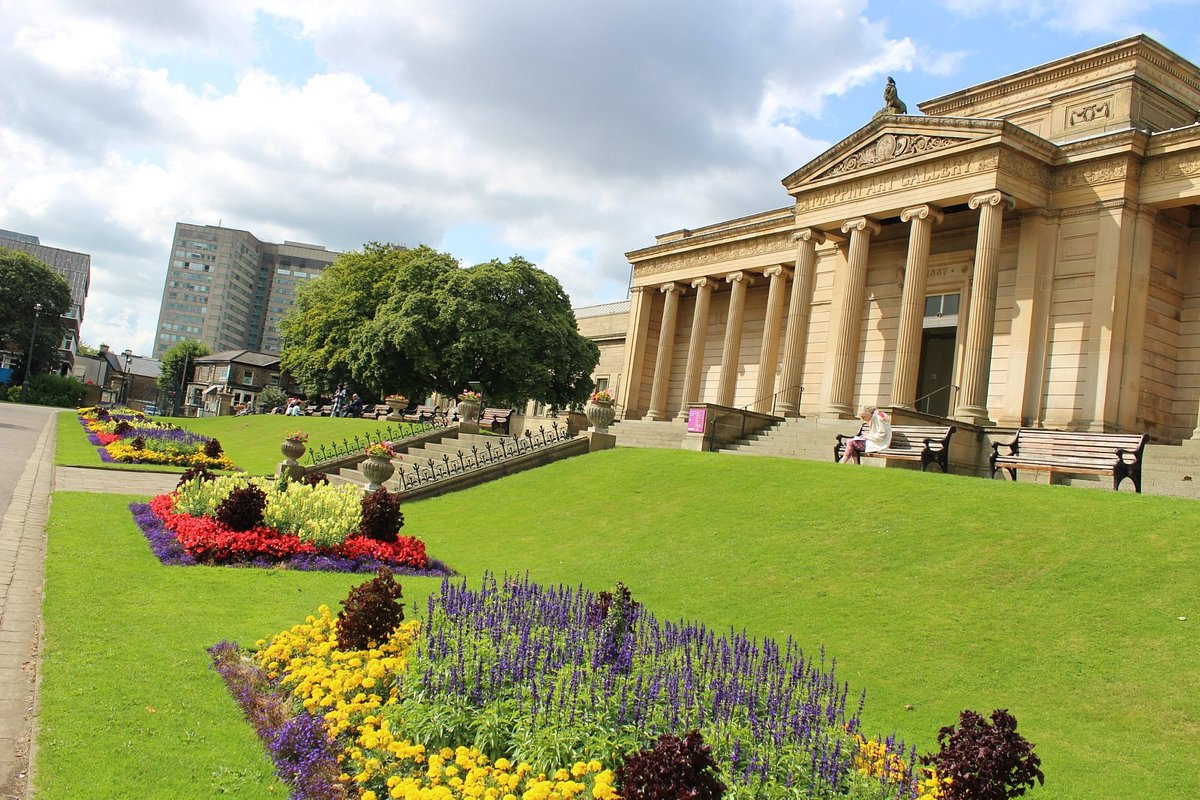
Weston Park with the Weston Park Museum

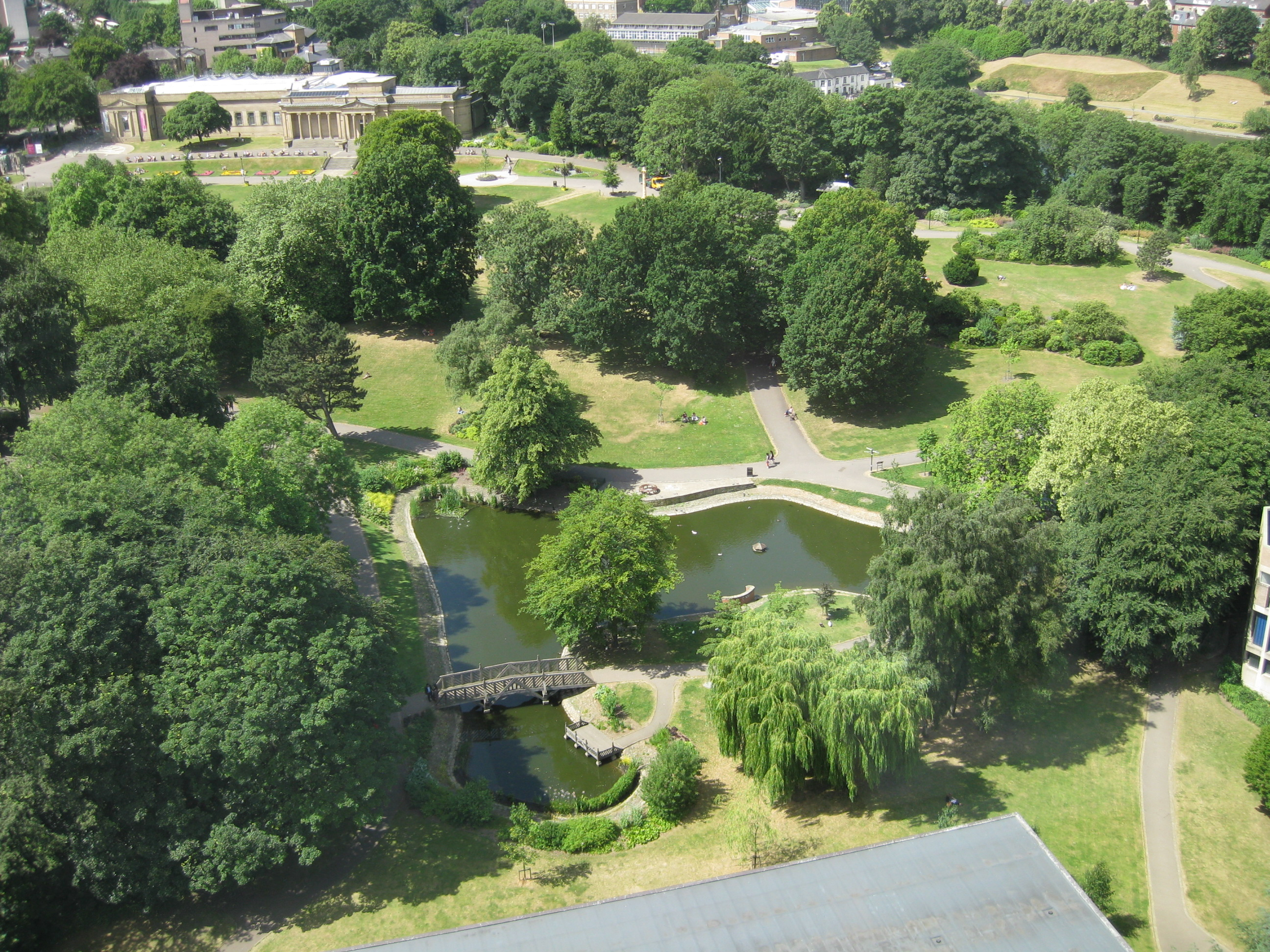
General view from the Arts Tower of the University of Sheffield

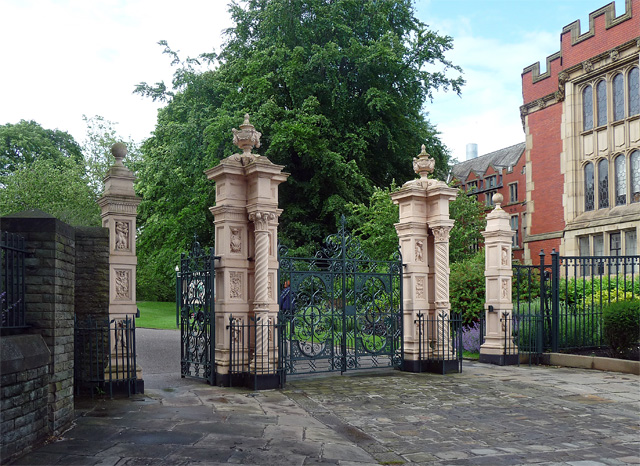
Terracotta pillars and park gates

== History ==
Weston Park was the first municipal park in the city and was developed from the grounds of Weston Hall, which the Sheffield Corporation purchased for £15,750 following the death of its owners, Eliza and Anne Harrison. The hall itself was converted into the Sheffield City Museum.

Weston Park (2005). The University of Sheffield Arts Tower can be seen in the background

Robert Marnock was commissioned to design the park in 1873. New terra cotta pillared entrances were established at Winter Street and Western Bank using designs by Godfrey Sykes. The original lake from Weston Hall was extended and redesigned and the Ebenezer Elliott memorial statue was moved to the park from its original place in Market Place. A memorial to Godfrey Sykes was also erected in 1875 during the construction of the park, consisting of an 8-metre-high (26 ft) terra cotta column designed by James Gamble, one of Sykes's pupils. It depicts youth, maturity and old age.

Statue of Ebenezer Elliott in Weston Park (28 March 2007)

The park was opened to the public on Monday 6 September 1875 with the following day's Sheffield Daily Telegraph reporting: "The weather was fine. The Park looked in its gayest Summer dress. The walks were freshly gravelled, the flower beds were trim and well ordered." In 1882 the Weston Park Weather Station was erected privately by the curator of the adjacent museum Elijah Howarth. Howarth was known as "Elijah the Prophet" because of his reputation for forecasting the weather, he prepared daily forecasts to warn miners of changes in air pressure that could trigger the release of dangerous gases, he recorded daily weather observations for 47 years. It is the official climatological station for Sheffield and since 1937 it has been run by the museum's staff. The station consists of thermometers housed in a Stevenson screen, tipping bucket and funnel rain gauges and a soil thermometer which takes readings at the depths of 30 cm and 100 cm. It is one of the oldest weather stations in the country and all records are freely available via computer database or printed media.

In 1895 the South West gates were erected on Western Bank close to the newly constructed Mappin Art Gallery. This became the park's main entrance and was built primarily so affluent visitors could drive their carriages right up to the gallery's door. The bandstand was added around 1900. It was designed by the Sheffield architects Flockton and Gibbs and constructed at a foundry in Glasgow. It was one of a pair, the other being placed in Hillsborough Park, but this has since been demolished. The bandstand was in use until the mid-1970s and many well-known bands have played there, including the Black Dyke Band and the Coldstream Guards Band; it has also staged several rock concerts there. The restored bandstand is now an approved Civil Wedding venue.

In 1905 the park was visited by King Edward VII and Queen Alexandra during a visit to Sheffield in which they also opened the nearby University of Sheffield. A war memorial to the York and Lancaster Regiment was erected in the park in 1923 to commemorate the 8,814 of the regiment who died in the First World War.

In the 1950s, Sheffield Corporation agreed to the demolition of the Winter Street Gate, along with its lodge and outbuildings to allow for the construction of the University Library (now the Western Bank Library). In 1995 the University of Sheffield tram stop was opened nearby on the South Yorkshire Supertram network, serving Weston Park with connections to Blue and Yellow route services.

In July 2016, to mark the 100th anniversary of the battle of the Somme, Weston Park was dedicated as a Fields in Trust Centenary Field by Sheffield City Council because of its local heritage and significance. The York & Lancaster Memorial within the park commemorates the loss of more than 8,800 soldiers during the First World War, including the Sheffield Pals brigade.

== Weston Park Restoration Project ==
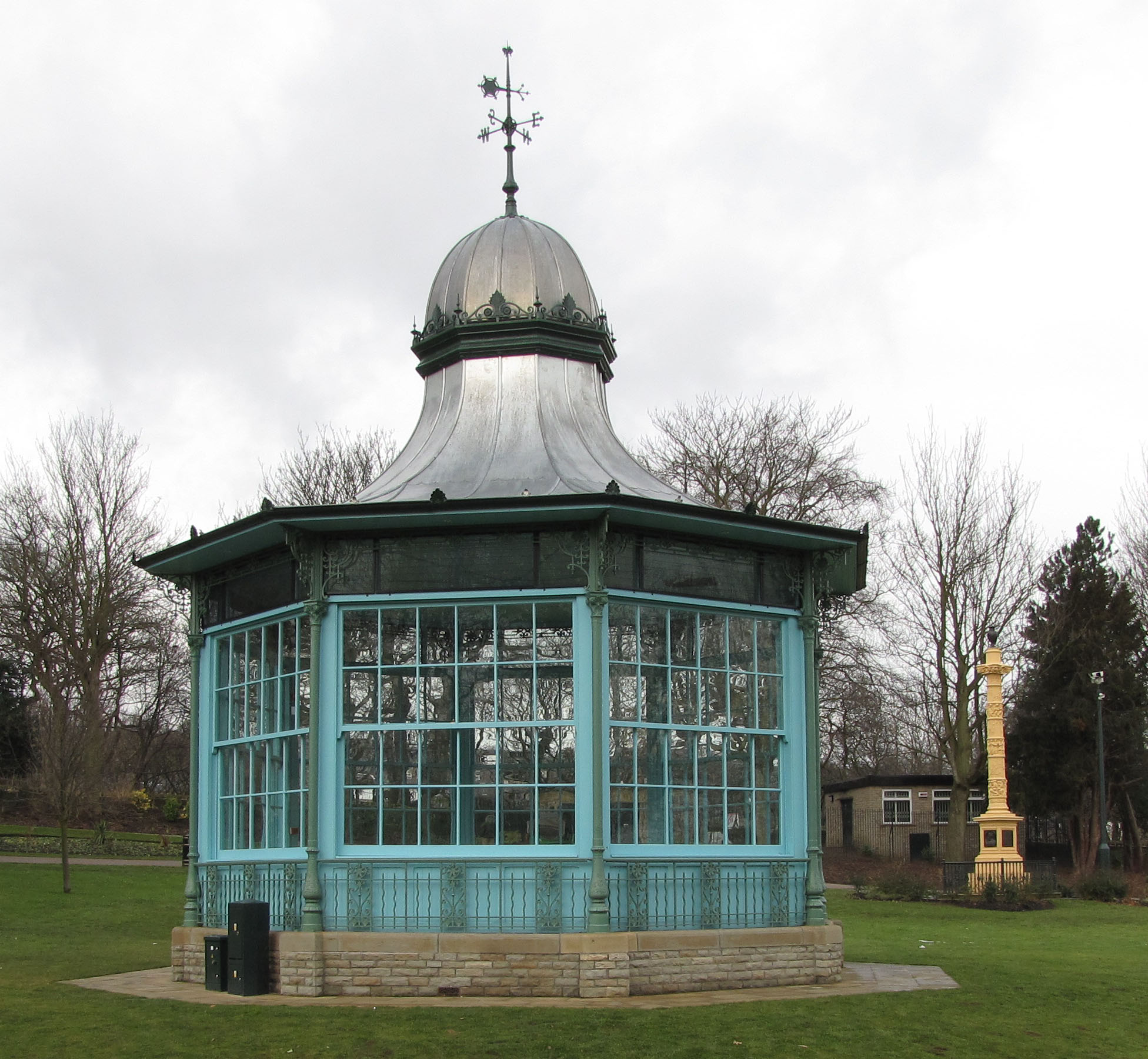
The restored bandstand with the Godfrey Sykes memorial in the background to the right.

In March 2006 it was announced that the Heritage Lottery Fund was awarding over £2,000,000 to help with the restoration of Weston Park. The work took two years to complete and consisted of the following work:

- Resurfacing all paths and replacing modern railings and gates with more appropriate designs.
- Refurbishing all seven of the Grade II listed monuments and memorials, which powerfully commemorate the valour and craftsmanship of the people of Sheffield and their efforts to promote social reform.
- Recreating the original vision for the lake as a striking reflective sheet of water crossed by two beautiful wooden bridges, using the original 1874 Marnock designs discovered in the city archives.
- Restoring the bandstand, which is a nationally rare example of a fully glazed structure, to create a unique cultural venue and outdoor classroom.
- Replacing the stolen south east gates, the theft of which in 1995 came to symbolise the lowest point in the fortunes of the park.
- Planting new trees and shrubs in Marnock's style to increase the all-year-round interest and sensory value.
- Installing new benches and creating quiet, sheltered seating areas.
- Remodelling and refurbishing two of the existing tennis courts.
- Providing improved facilities for the park staff.
- Installing lighting and CCTV along one of the principal routes through the park.
- Improving access to ensure all areas of the park are wheelchair accessible.
- Installing new signage and interpretation boards.
- Developing a range of activities and events to encourage new users from across the city and beyond.

The park was formally reopened on Sunday 1 June 2008 by the Lord Mayor of Sheffield.

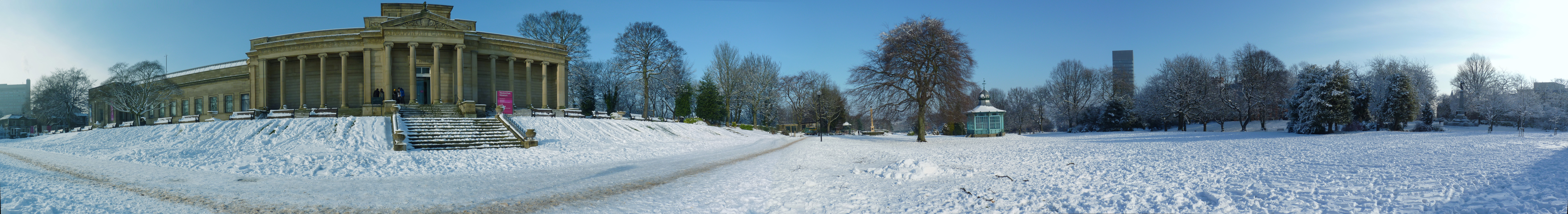
Weston Park Museum panorama in winter. (The right side of the building is missing as was bombed in the Second World War.)
