= Crookes Valley Park =

Park in Sheffield, England

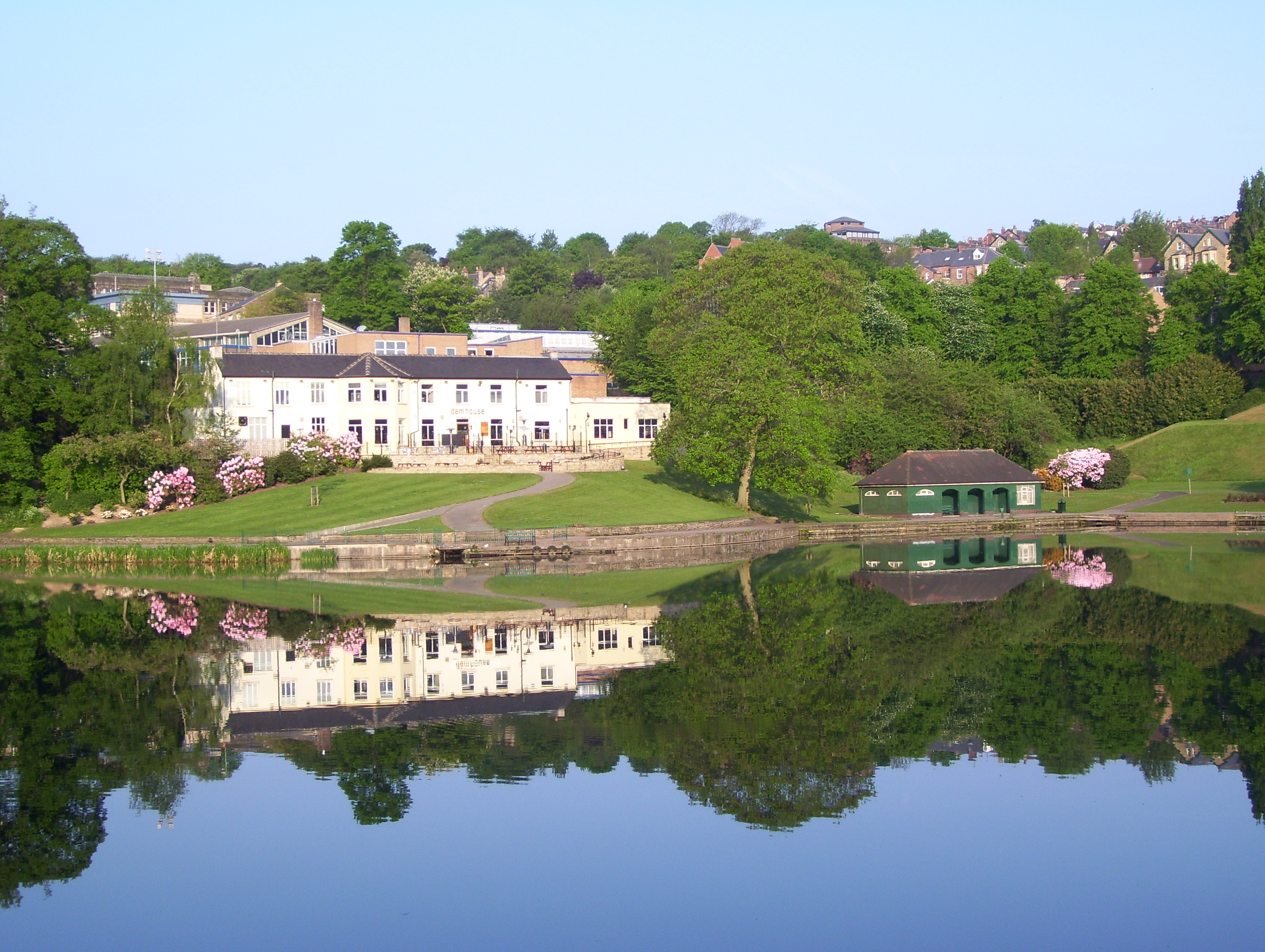
The lake with Dam House in the background.

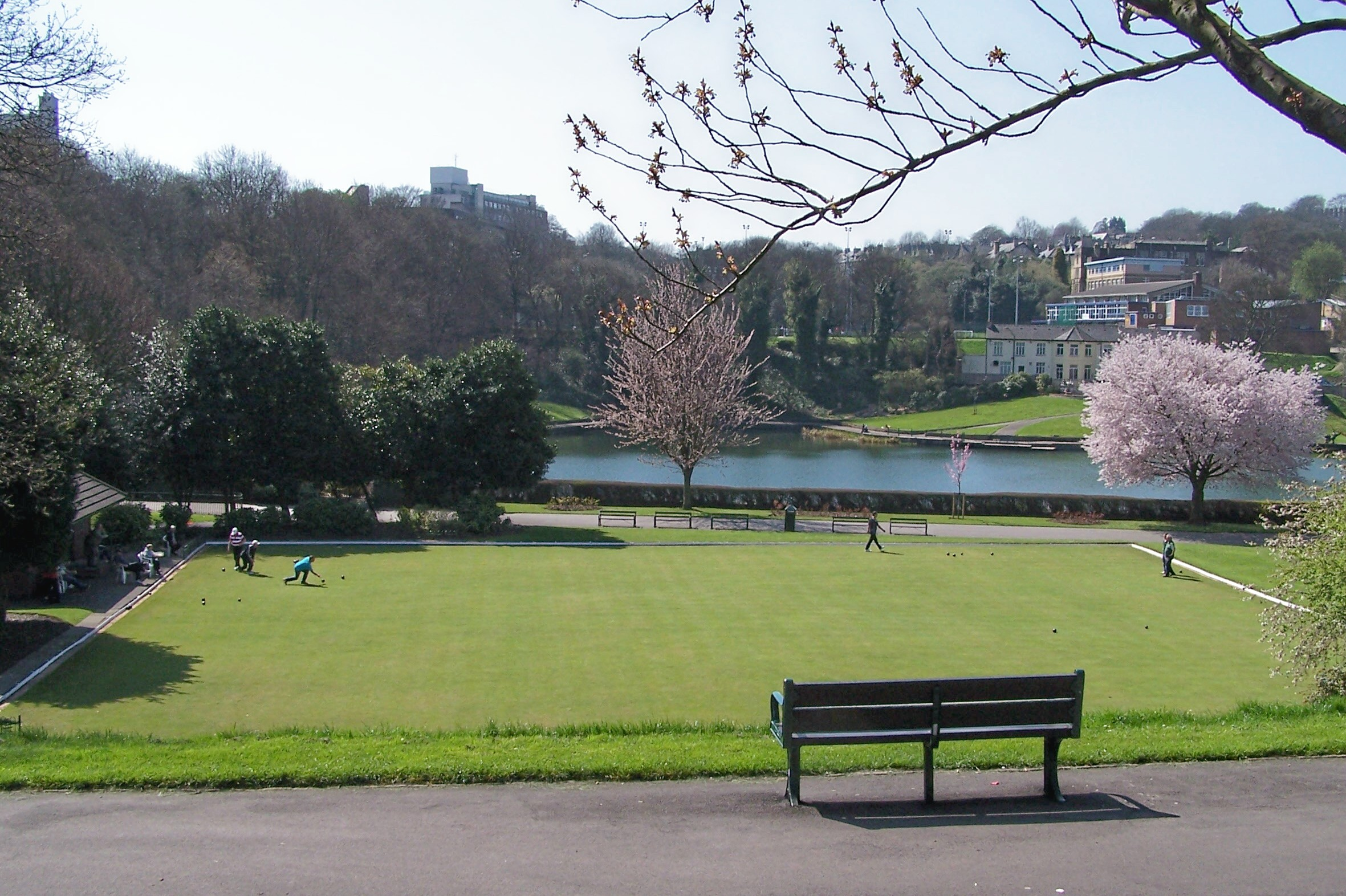
A view of the bowling green

Crookes Valley Park is an area of public parkland in the Crookesmoor area of the City of Sheffield in South Yorkshire, England. The park lies just under two kilometres west of the city centre at 53.3834°N 1.4929°W. It is one of the three "Crookesmoor Parks" the other two being Weston Park and The Ponderosa.

== History ==
Crookes Valley Park covers an area of approximately 4.8 hectares (11.9 acres), and the majority of the park is taken up by the lake, which was originally a water supply reservoir called the Old Great Dam. It was one of ten reservoirs built in open countryside in the valley between Crookes and Upperthorpe to supply water to the growing City of Sheffield in the 18th century. The Old Great Dam was built in 1785 with a capacity of 21 million imperial gallons (95,000 m^{3}) and was thought big enough to supply the town for many years, however the ten reservoirs became obsolete by the 20th century and were all filled in with the exception of the Old Great Dam.

The Old Great Dam was integrated into Crookes Valley Park when it was set out by Sheffield Corporation in the early years of the 20th century. For many years it was used as a boating lake and has been used for fishing. It is fed by a small stream which flows through a culvert into the western corner. The lake is said to be 60 feet (18 m) deep and there are unsubstantiated stories of large Pike and Zander living in the depths. On the south western fringe of the park is the Dam House bar and restaurant, a building of some antiquity. It was built in the 1780s when the Dam was being constructed and originally served as the house of the Water Board's solicitor.

Two bowling greens were constructed in the park shortly after it was opened, and a children's playground was built in the 1970s. Both were constructed in a part of the park which was known as the recreation ground, and thus marked on old Ordnance Survey maps, it was an area of quite steep banking built as a dam wall for the reservoir.

== Swimming ==
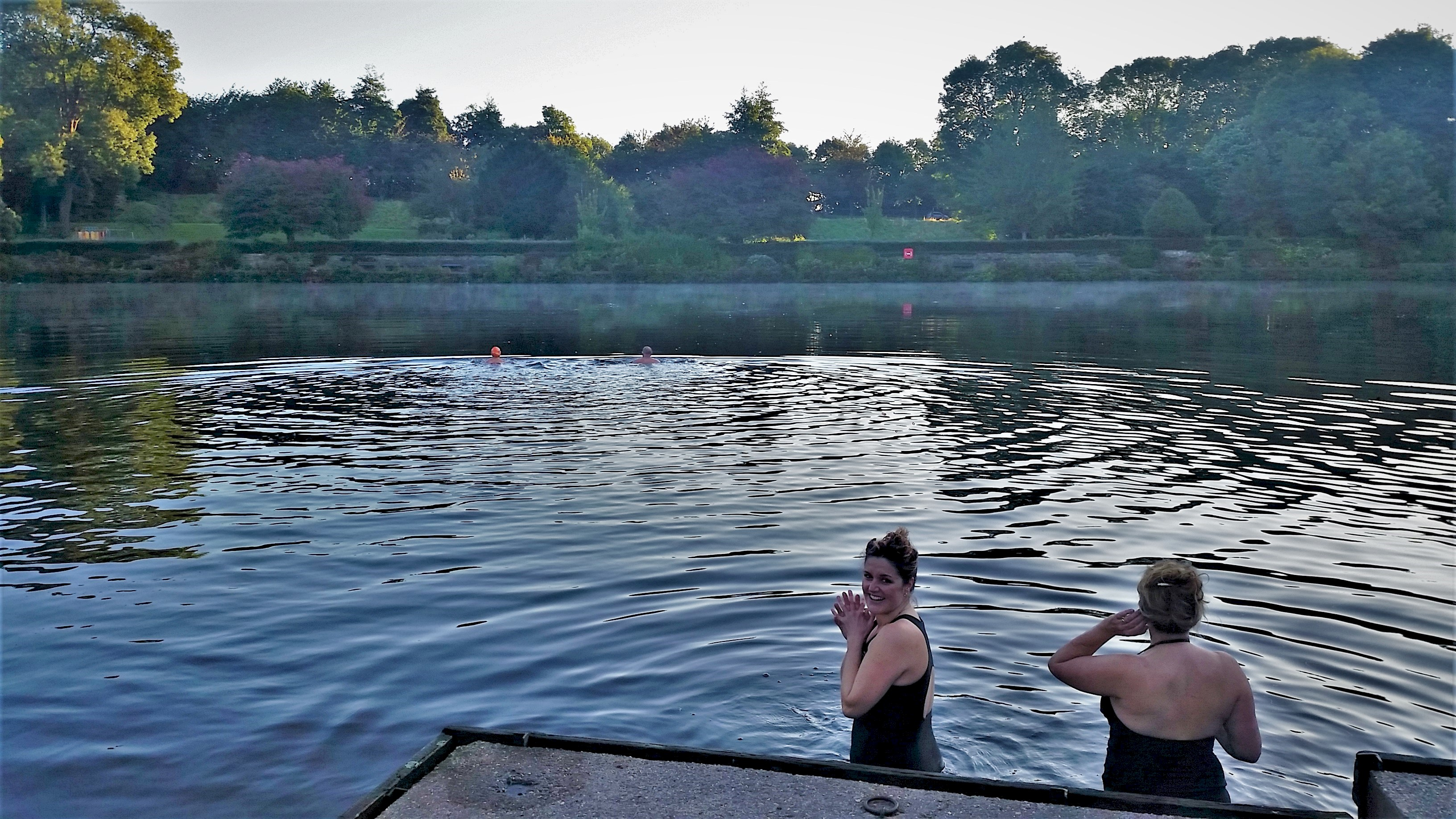
Swimmers entering the mist-covered lake in Crookes Valley Park on a spring morning.

Swimming takes place at the lake almost every day of the year, despite signage at the site stating "No Swimming". Swimmers have been known to break ice in the middle of winter to swim. Local swimmers have approached the council various times in attempt to replace the "No Swimming" signs with useful and accurate water safety signage, with help and advice from the Outdoor Swimming Society Inland Access Group.

On 18 July 2021, a man drowned while swimming in the lake. Emergency services arrived on scene but were unable to retrieve him in time. The park was then evacuated to make way for a more thorough search.

== Artistic depictions ==
The Dam House and Old Great Dam was painted by the artist William Ibbitt and is featured in a photograph from the 1950s in the Frith Collection.

== Ecology ==
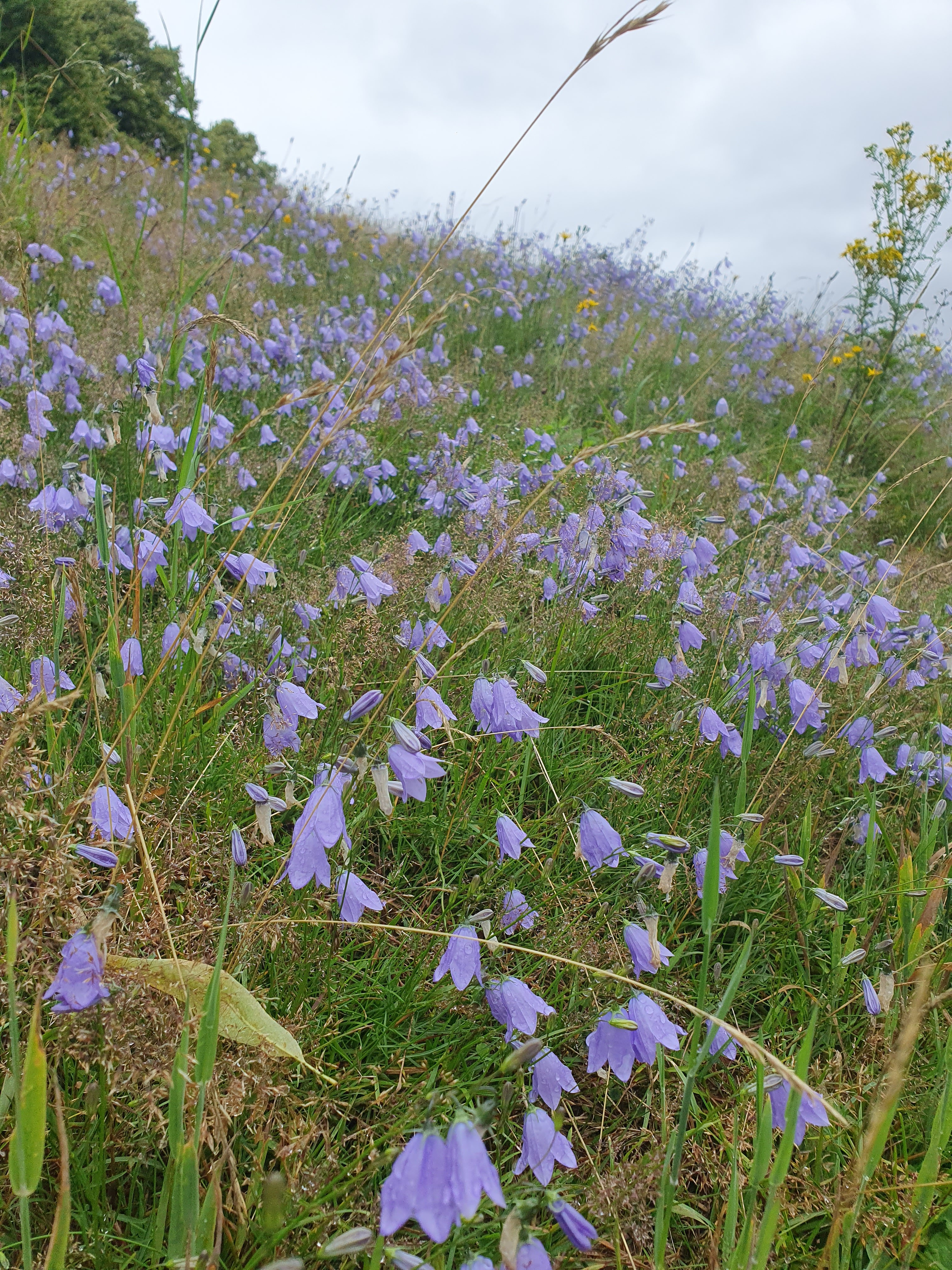
The harebell bank at Crookes Valley Park in July 2023

The park features a grassy bank containing moorland species including harebell (Campanula rotundifolia), mat-grass (Nardus stricta), and heath grass (Danthonia decumbens). It is thought to be a remnant of Crookes moor, for which the area is named.

The southern corner of the lake is managed as a pond and contains wetland species including yellow flag iris (Iris pseudacorus), water figwort (Scrophularia auriculata), bogbean (Menyanthes trifoliata), purple loosestrife (Lythrum salicaria), and water horehound (Lycopus europaeus).
