= Netherthorpe, Sheffield =

Area of Sheffield, England

Coordinates: 53.386°N 1.484°W

Netherthorpe
- Location within South Yorkshire
- OS grid reference: SK343876
- Metropolitan borough: Sheffield
- Metropolitan county: South Yorkshire
- Region: Yorkshire and the Humber
- Country: England
- Sovereign state: United Kingdom
- Post town: SHEFFIELD
- Postcode district: S3
- Dialling code: 0114
- Police: South Yorkshire
- Fire: South Yorkshire
- Ambulance: Yorkshire
- UK Parliament: Sheffield Central

Netherthorpe is a suburb of the City of Sheffield in England. It is one mile (1.6 km) west of the city centre. It is mostly an area of local government built housing situated on a considerable slope running downhill from the Brook Hill roundabout, at a height of 350 feet (107m), towards the Shalesmoor roundabout at a height of 160 feet (50m) over a distance of half a mile (1 km). It is bounded by the suburbs of Upperthorpe to the north, Crookesmoor to the west and the dualled Inner Ring Road (Netherthorpe Road) to the east. The suburb falls within the Walkley ward of the City.

== Etymology ==
The newly created 1850s suburb, built on previously open moorland, was named by town planners who proposed 'Netherthorpe' to complement the adjoining, long established suburb of Upperthorpe - an area of some antiquity, founded by the Vikings as a settlement in the 9th century.

== History ==
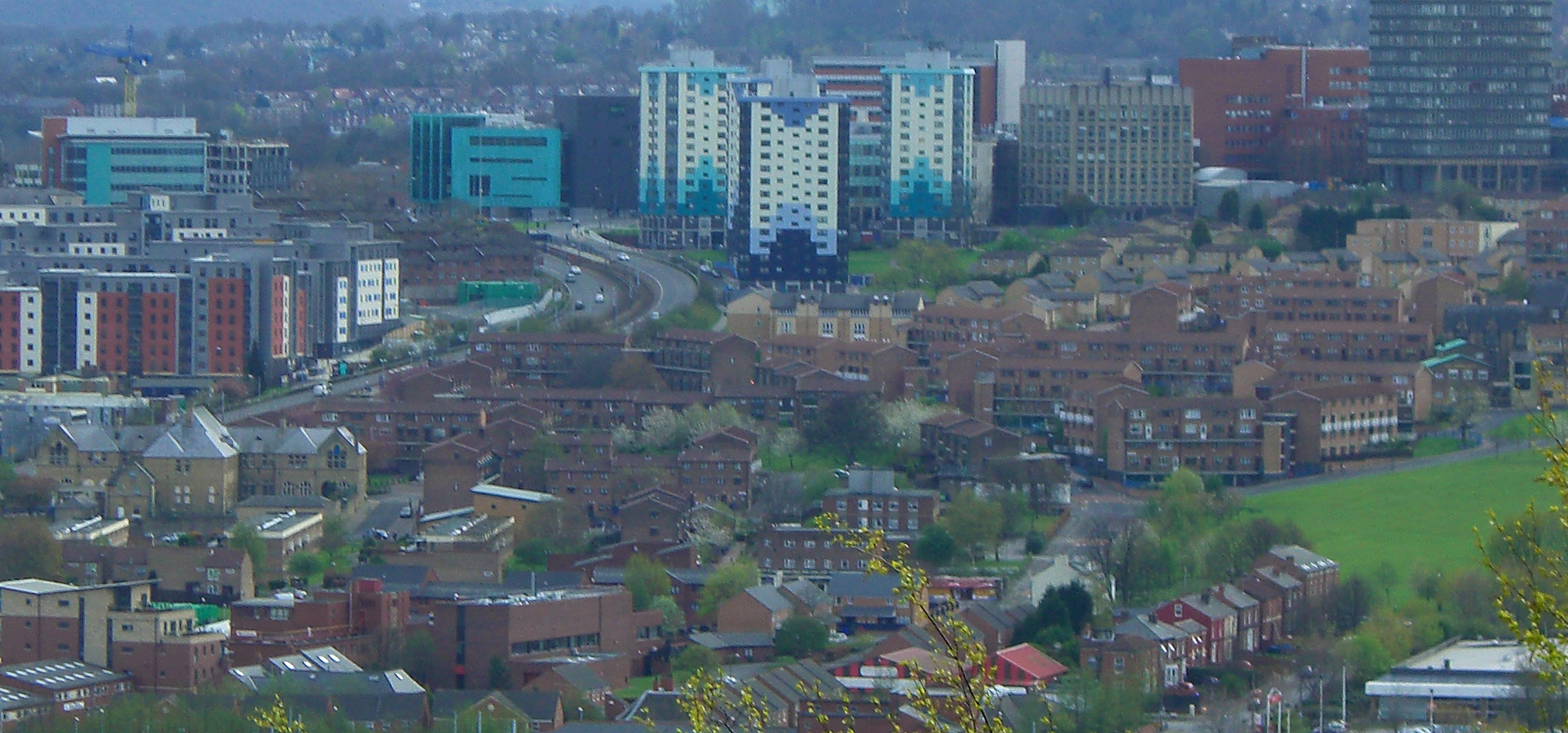
General view of Netherthorpe from Parkwood Springs

=== Early development ===
Before the middle part of the 19th century, Netherthorpe was a totally rural location, with J. Tayler's map of Sheffield of 1832 showing it as an area of fields and pasture. By 1850, J. Rapkin's map showed the western limit of Sheffield town being marked by St George's Church at Portobello, leaving the present Netherthorpe area still just outside the built up area. However, this changed in the second half of the 19th century, when a populous and thriving neighbourhood of back-to-back houses and other homes around courtyards, schools, churches, shops and pubs were built in the area alongside factories, iron works, and small firms engaged in engineering and steel finishing. The 1903 Ordnance Survey map shows Netherthorpe as a fully built up area, with St Philip's Road being the main North-to-South artery through the suburb. Life in Netherthorpe's terraced housing community of the 1940s and 1950s is covered in the local author Fred Pass’ books Weerz My Dad and Weerz My Mam; he lived in Martin Street as a youth.

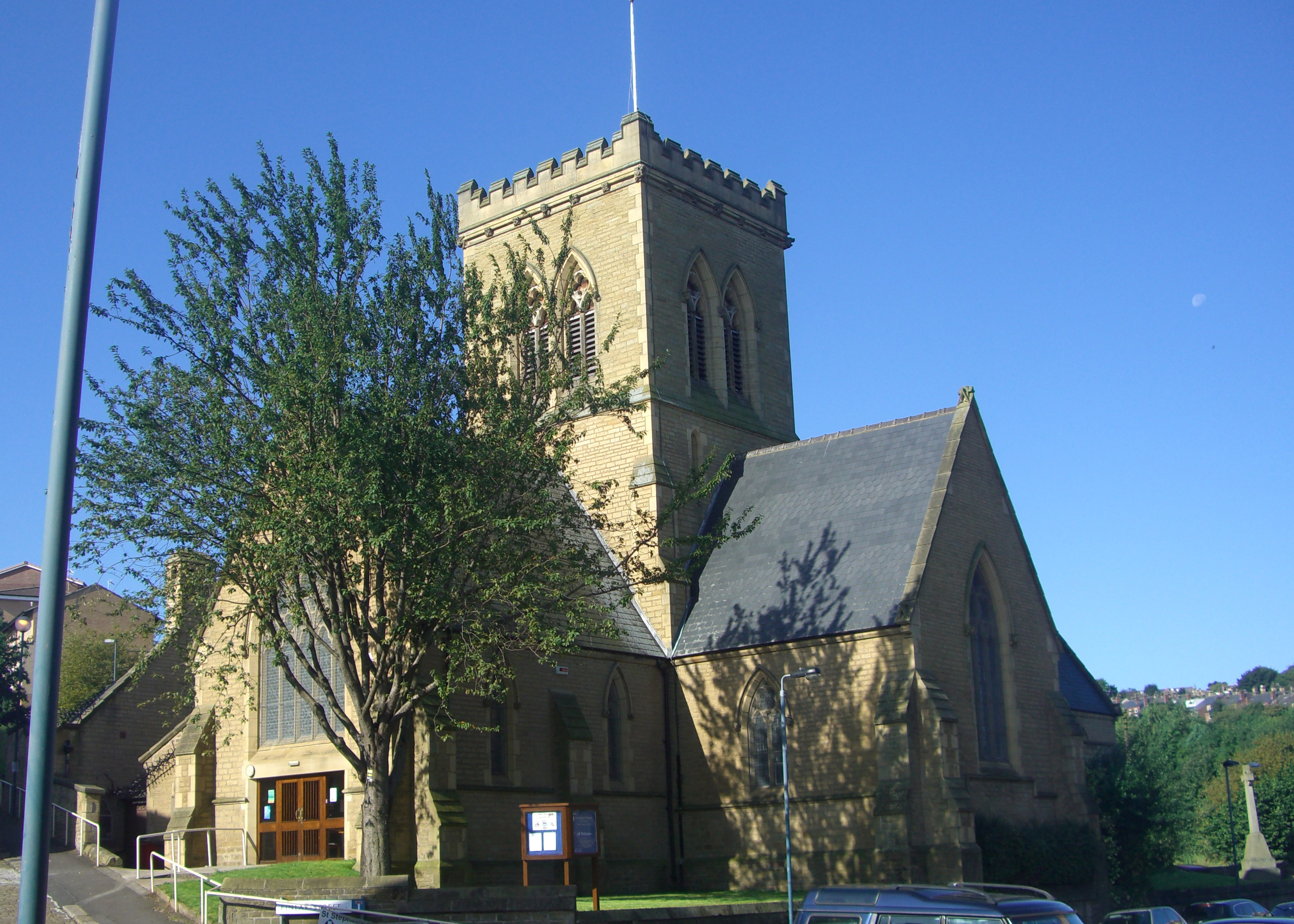
St Stephen's Church

=== Redevelopment ===
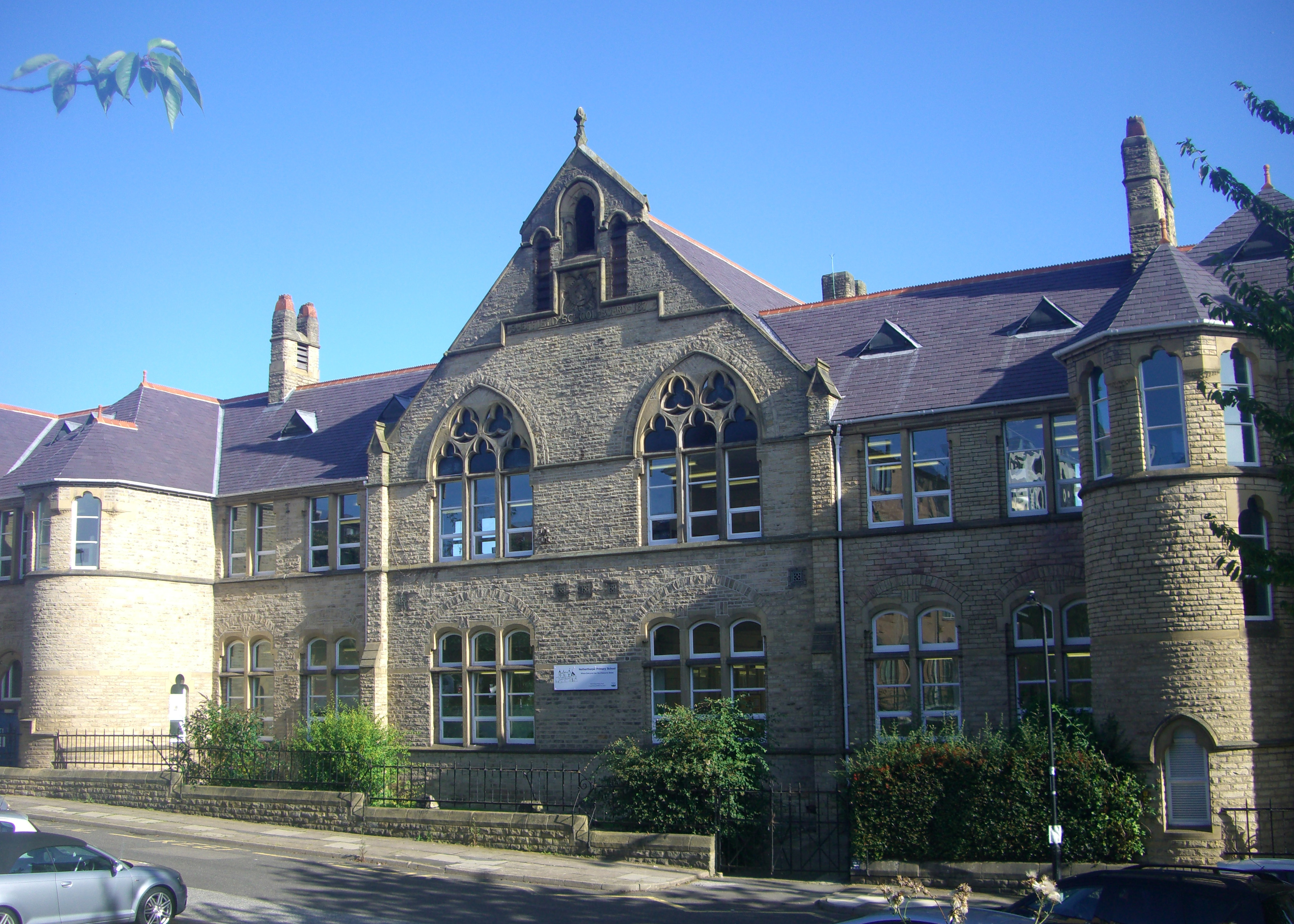
Netherthorpe Primary School

Demolition of Netherthorpe's Victorian terraced housing began in 1956, with no consultation of those living there, most of whom were dispersed across the city to estates in other areas. While appreciating having upgraded facilities such as indoor bathrooms, there was also sadness at the loss of a close-knit community. It was part of a complete redevelopment over an area of 48.5 hectares, under the auspices of City Architect, J. L. Womersley. St Annes Church on Hoyle Street was demolished in the latter stages of the renewal. The new dwellings, constructed in phases between 1959 and 1972, were mostly Local Authority built tower blocks and three and four storey maisonettes. The high blocks were sited overlooking open space while the low blocks were grouped to form a series of interlinked courtyards with pedestrian paths around the buildings. Smaller flats were provided in the lower buildings to facilitate older people living close to their grown up families. The four tower blocks, completed in 1962, with the postal addresses of Brightmore Drive or Mitchell Street, were given the individual names of Adamfield, Cornhill, Robertshaw and Crawshaw. Two of the tower blocks have 14 storeys while the other two have 12. They were improved and re-clad in a blue and cream colour scheme in 1998. Some of the maisonettes were pulled down in the early part of the 21st century and replaced by conventional houses. When the Victorian terraced houses were demolished in the 1950s an area of parkland known as The Ponderosa was created as a recreation area for Netherthorpe and the adjoining suburb of Upperthorpe.

== Significant buildings ==
Netherthorpe has three 19th-century buildings; two of them are grade II listed, being St Stephen's Church and Netherthorpe Primary School. St Stephen's Church on Fawcett Street was constructed in 1856 by the architects Flockton & Son. In the 1950s, the large church was considered to be too large for the shrinking congregation, and a dividing wall was built to create a smaller worship area and a community hall for use by the general public. Netherthorpe Primary School on Netherthorpe Street was built in 1873 by Innocent and Brown and takes children between the ages of three and eleven. The school has a modern sports hall on Dover Street. The other school in the area is the Bethany School on Finlay Street which takes pupils between the ages of four and 16. It is a Christian Family School which has been based in Netherthorpe since 2001. However, the building dates from 1860, when it opened as the St Stephen's Primary School. It stood vacant for a time before being taken over by the Bethany School.

== Modern developments ==
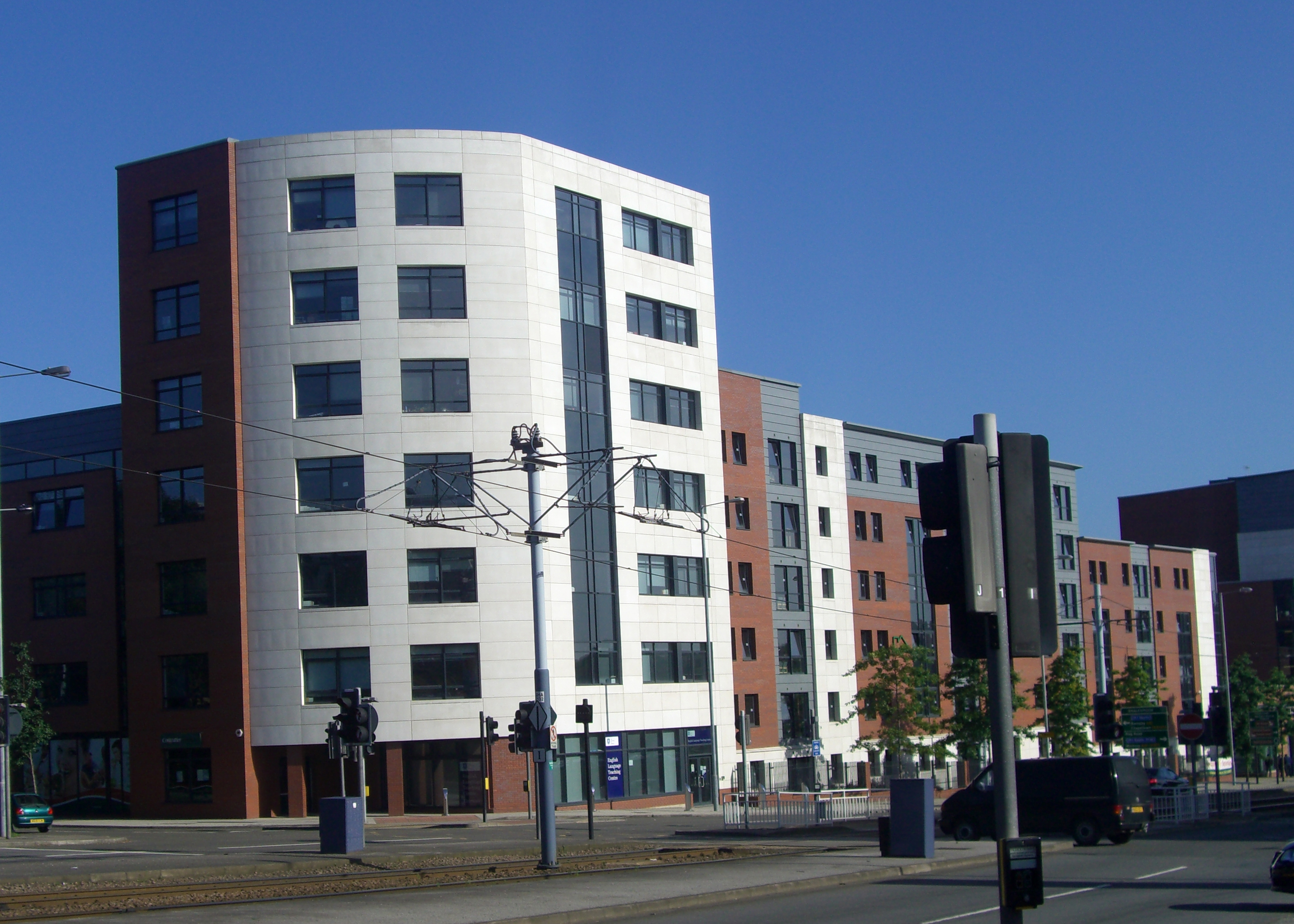
Opal 3 and the English Language Teaching Centre

One of the most significant contemporary developments in Netherthorpe has been the opening of Netherthorpe Road tram stop on the Blue and Yellow routes of the South Yorkshire Supertram network in 1995. Netherthorpe's close proximity to the University of Sheffield has always meant that the suburb has had a large concentration of students. In 2009, the Opal 3 complex was built on Hoyle Street with accommodation for 992 students with leisure facilities and disabled access. Located within Opel 3 is the English Language Teaching Centre, part of Sheffield University.

=== Other information ===
There are no GP practices within the immediate Netherthorpe area, with the nearest ones being the Upperthorpe Medical Centre on Addy Street and the Sheffield City GP Health Centre on Broad Lane. There is one public house within the suburb: the White Hart on St Philips Road, a traditional "estate pub". The main shopping facilities consist of a Sainsbury's Local at the top of Weston Street and a large Tesco which occupies part of the grounds of the old Sheffield Royal Infirmary (technically in Upperthorpe as it has an S6 postcode). The Medico-Legal Centre on Watery Street provides facilities and services required for the investigation of sudden and unexpected death. It includes the offices and court of the Coroner for South Yorkshire West District and the public mortuary.

== Statistics ==
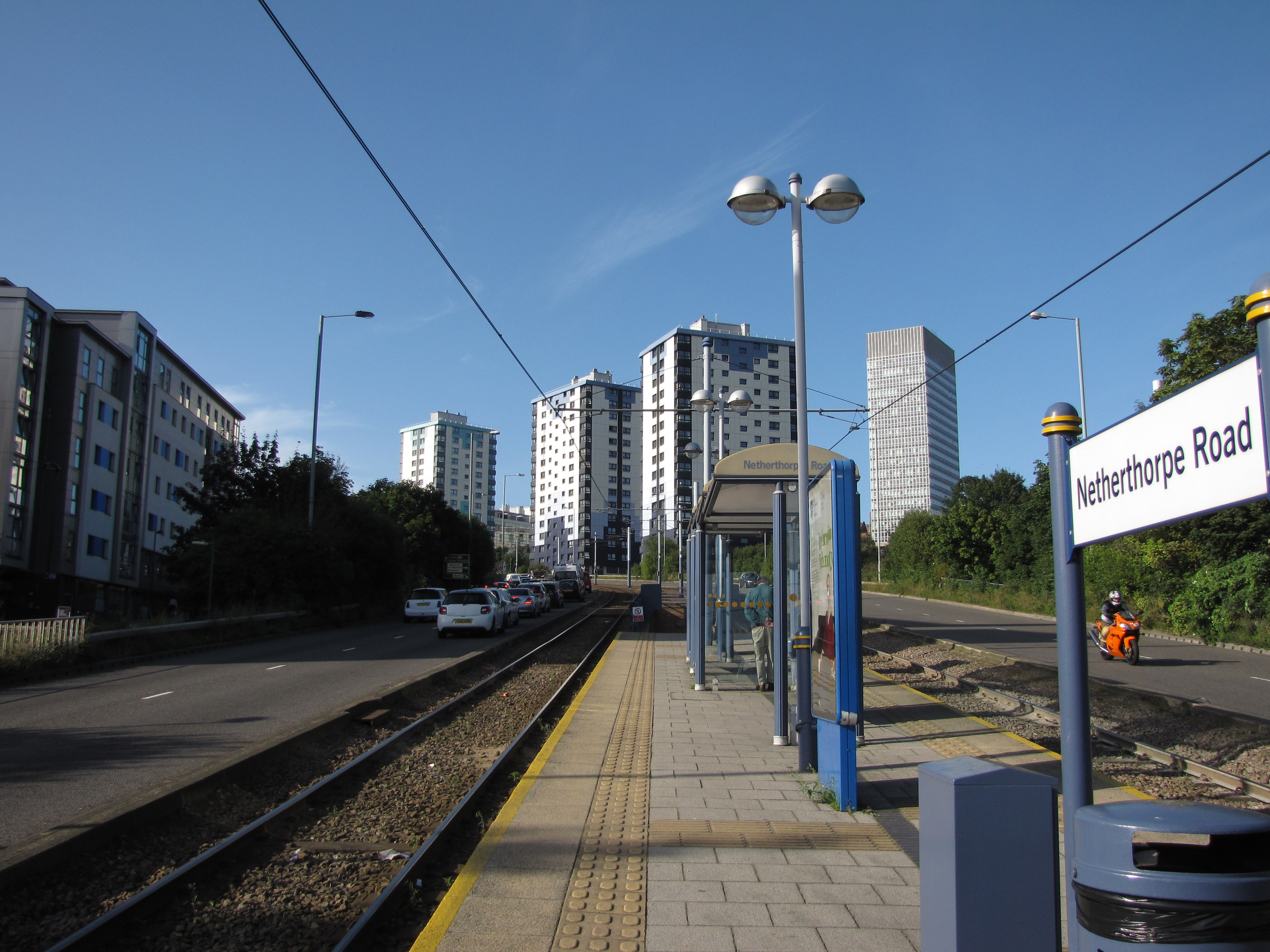
The tower blocks seen from the Netherthorpe Road tram stop. The tall building on the right is the Sheffield University Arts Tower

Netherthorpe has a population of around 3,000 with the 2003 Population Health Register giving an official number of 2,925. The ethnic breakdown shows that the suburb has much higher percentage of non-white people living within it than the Sheffield average with a high number of mixed race, Asian, Black and Chinese people living in the suburb, the high number of students in the area is the main contributing factor in this. Statistics class Netherthorpe as a Most Deprived area with 30% of households claiming income support compared to the Sheffield average of 17%. There is an unemployment rate of 10.4% compared to the city average of 4.2%. In housing statistics, 75% of residents live in flats, maisonettes or apartments compared to the Sheffield average of 18%. 65% of Netherthorpe properties are rented from the local authority compared to the city average of 26% while only 15% of the population are owner occupiers of their house.
