= Ponderosa (Sheffield) =

Open space in Sheffield, England

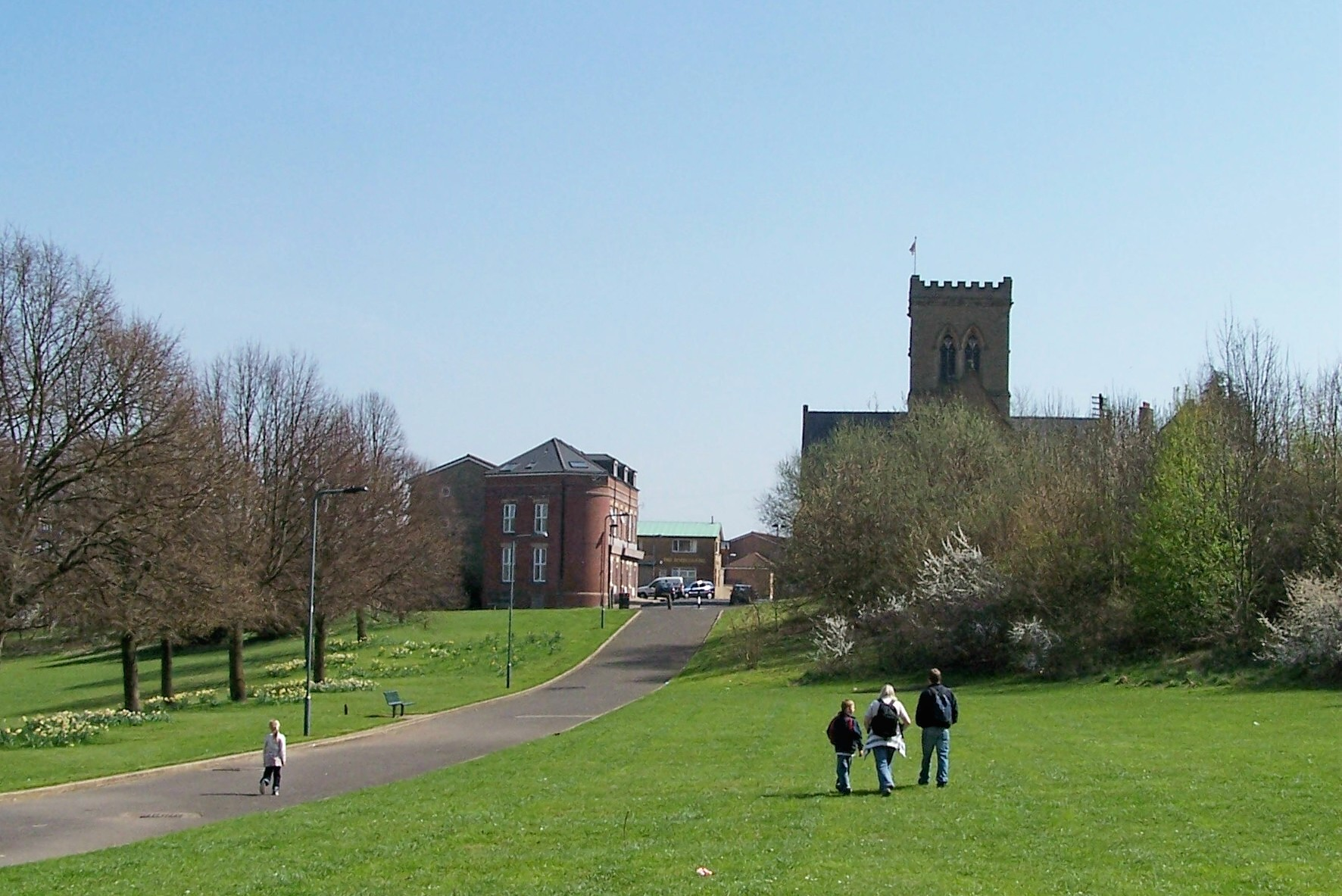
The Ponderosa and St Stephen’s Church

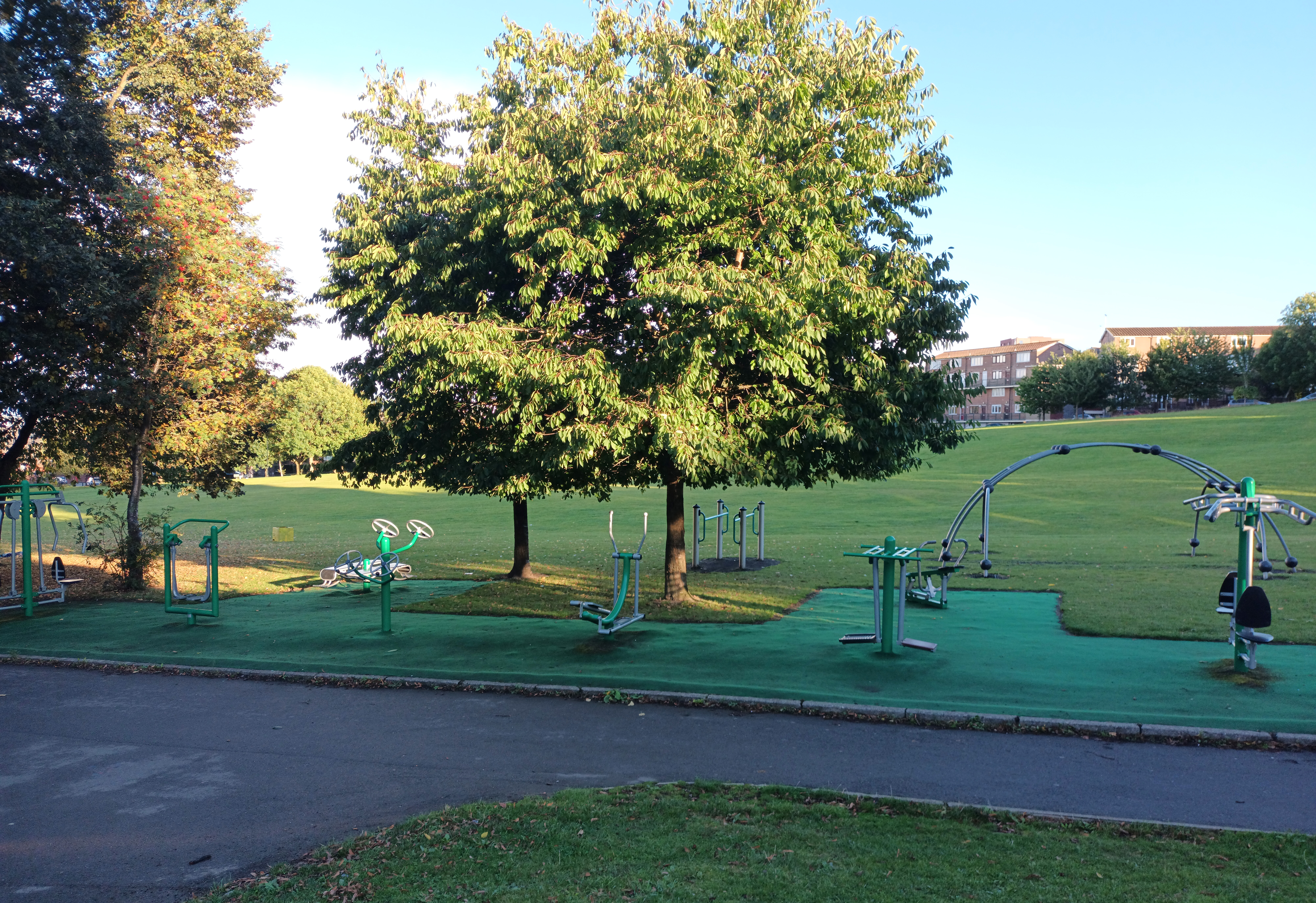
Outdoor Gym

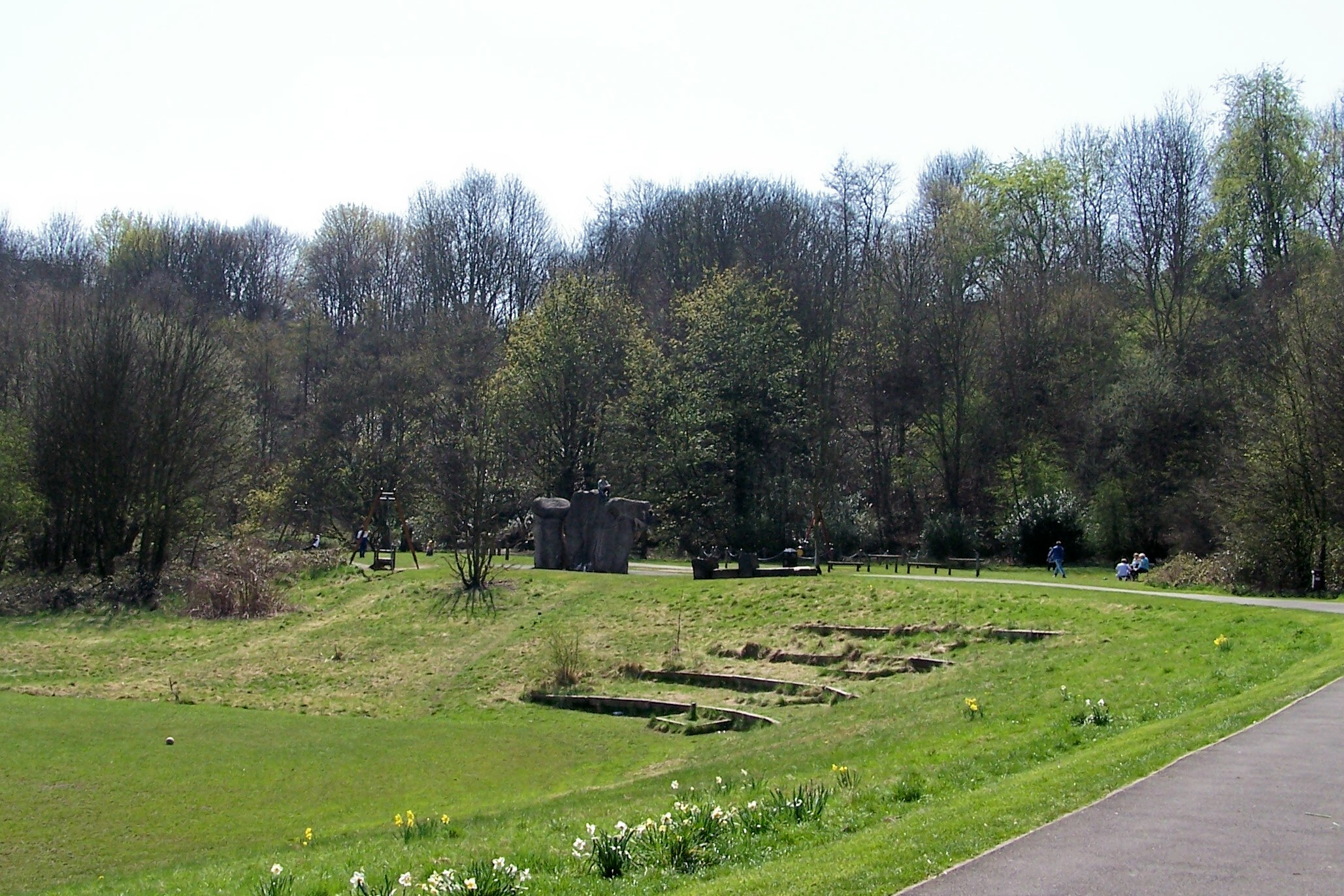
Play area

The Ponderosa is a recreation area within the City of Sheffield, South Yorkshire, England. Although not a public park it was designated as Open Space by Sheffield City Council in the 1993 Unitary Development Plan. It covers an area of over 25 acres (10 ha) and is located at 53.3868°N 1.4865°W, 0.9 miles (1.5 km) west of the city centre between the districts of Upperthorpe and Netherthorpe. Although the name "Ponderosa" was originally an informal name given by local children, it is now the accepted title and is recognised by the local council. Along with Weston Park and Crookes Valley Park it is one of the three "Crookesmoor Parks".

== History ==
The Ponderosa can be split into two distinct halves, each with contrasting history. The upper part was for many years known as Crookesmoor Recreation Ground, however prior to that it was an area of small dams in open countryside. The dams were built around 1740 by Joshua Matthewman after he had gained permission from the Lord of the Manor, Edward Howard, 9th Duke of Norfolk. The dams were constructed to impound local spring water to supply the town of Sheffield. J. Tayler's map of Sheffield of 1832 shows a string of four small dams below (north) of what is now Crookes Valley Road and on the site of the present day upper Ponderosa. These four dams were filled in during the second half of the 19th century and by 1903 it was shown on the map as Crookesmoor Recreation Ground. During World War II the recreation ground was used as a station for barrage balloons to defend the city.

In the first half of the 19th century the lower part of The Ponderosa was open countryside just to the south west of the Sheffield General Infirmary which at that time stood in a rural location to the west of the town. During the second half of the 1800s an area of back-to-back houses known as the Port Mahon estate was constructed on the site. This housing stood until the 1960s when it was demolished as part of a programme of urban development in the Upperthorpe and Netherthorpe areas. Certain thoroughfares such as Wentworth Street, Watery Lane, Hammond Street disappeared and Burlington Street partially disappeared altogether and the housing between Martin Street and Wentworth Street was replaced by tower blocks and maisonettes leaving a central area for recreation. This recreation area was christened "The Ponderosa" by local children after the name of the ranch in the TV series Bonanza which was popular throughout the 1960s.

== Present day ==
In the 1960s the area was a bare open bowl but much appreciated and used by the local community for games and community events. Since then there has been much development. The upper part of the Ponderosa is clothed in woodland, scrub, meadow and rough grassland which gives a fine environment for wildlife. Foxes and kestrels are often seen, and there is a wealth of bird and butterfly species. The upper part also contains an adventure playground and a mini football pitch. In 1999 the Crookes Valley Road entrance was given new gateway pillars, with each pillar consisting of three carved telegraph poles. The lower part of the Ponderosa stands in the shadow of seven tower blocks on its western side and St Stephen's church on Fawcett Street on its eastern. This lower area has a children's playground and several wooded copses.

In 1990 The Ponderosa Environmental Group (PEG) was formed and planted a community orchard consisting of apple and plum trees. Since then more fruit trees and spring bulbs have been added as well as four acres of native woodland. The group is committed to improving the open space and played a major part in the campaign to prevent housing development on the Ponderosa in 1993.

Ponderosa is also home to Peace in the Park, an annual free festival promoting peace and understanding by bringing together communities through artistic, musical and vocal expression. In 2015 the main stage for the Tramlines Festival was moved to the Ponderosa with Festival Director, Sarah Nulty, saying; "we had record numbers attend the festival and the Main Stage in 2014, and knew that it was the right time for us to make the move. Ponderosa is a great space and we’re really looking forward to developing the look and feel of the festival." In 2019, the Fire in the Park event took place during heavy prolonged rain. The event Bass in the Park, scheduled for the following day, had to be cancelled due to the park's grassed area being severely damaged by the attending crowds creating a mud bath.
