= York and Lancaster Memorial, Sheffield =

War memorial in Sheffield, England

York and Lancaster Regiment War Memorial
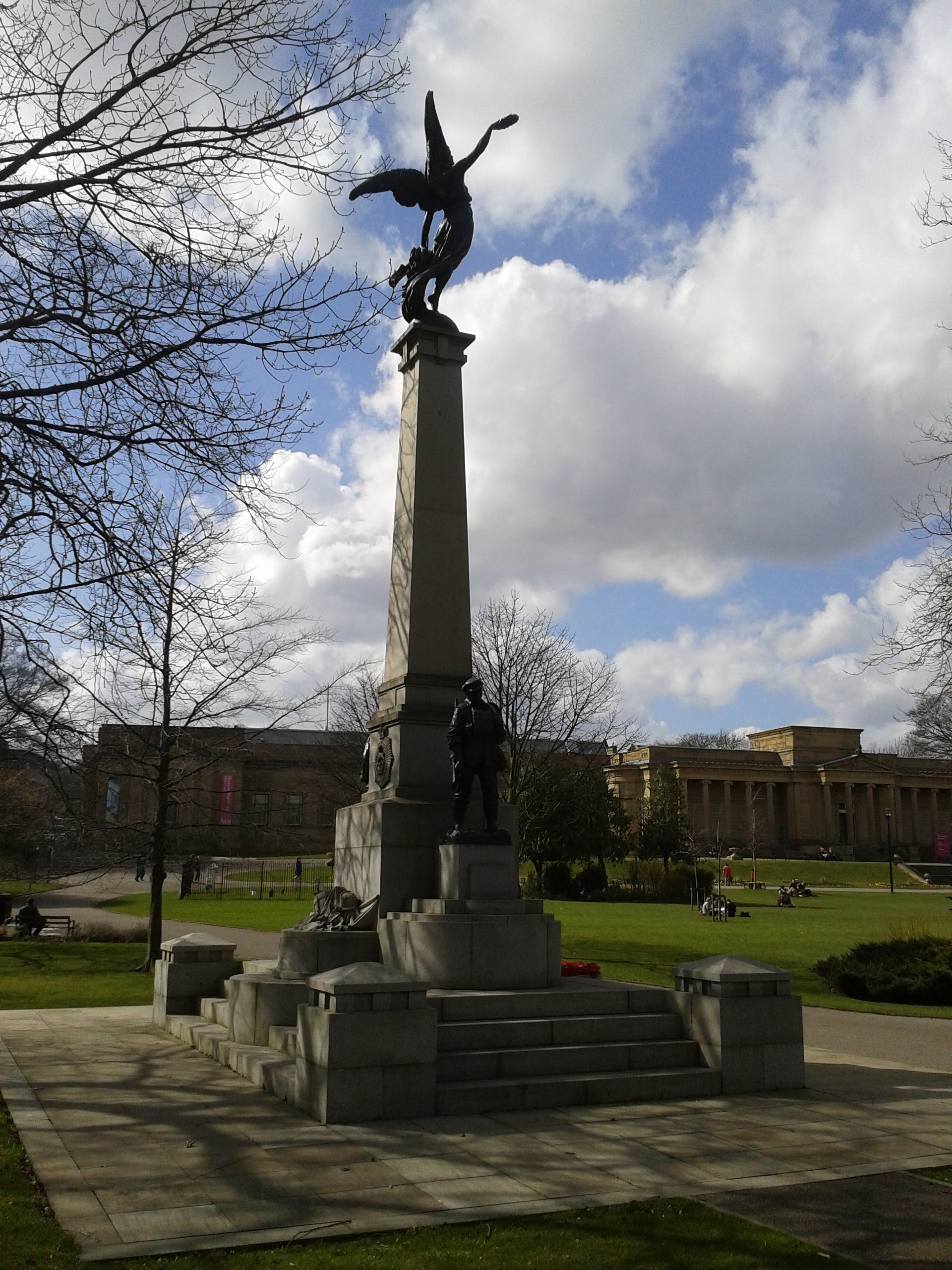
- The memorial in 2013
- Interactive map of York and Lancaster Regiment War Memorial
- Location: Weston Park, Sheffield, England
- Coordinates: 53.381258°N 1.490581°W
- Designer: Francis Jahn; Roy Smith; G N Morewood
- Material: Granite ashlar; Bronze statues
- Opening date: 7 July 1923
- Dedicated to: War dead

The York and Lancaster Regiment War Memorial (or York and Lancaster Memorial) is a war memorial to members of the York and Lancaster Regiment, in Weston Park, Sheffield, England. It was erected in the park in 1923 to commemorate the 8,814 members of the regiment who died in the First World War. The original inscription (all in upper case) reads:

To the everlasting honour
and glory of the 8814 officers
non-commissioned officers and
men of the York and Lancaster
regiment who fell in the great
war • 1914–1918

An inscription commemorating the victims of the Second World War was added after that conflict ended:

Also of
1222
members of the regiment
who fell in the war
1939–1945

The monument consists of a winged female figure, variously described as Liberty or Victory, mounted on a granite ashlar obelisk with a stone stepped-base, with two attendant bronze figures of a helmeted officer with a drawn pistol, and a private with a Lee-Enfield rifle. The memorial cost £12,000, which was raised by a 'York and Lancaster Memorial Committee', through public subscription.

Sheffield Technical School of Art were invited to design the memorial. The female figure is by a lecturer, Francis Jahn, while the statues of soldiers, inscribed "E J Parlanti founder, London", are by two students, Roy Smith (the officer) and G N Morewood. Other students acted as models. Smith also provided the stone carving at the base of the reverse of the monument, as well as the overall design, which was previously and erroneously attributed to Charles Sargeant Jagger, who had also taught at Sheffield.

The memorial was unveiled by Field Marshal Herbert Plumer on 7 July 1923.

It was Grade II listed in June 1973, giving it legal protection from unauthorised alteration or demolition.

The memorial should not be confused with the York and Lancaster Regiment Boer War memorial, which stands adjacent.
