= Goodwin Sports Centre =

Sporting facility and gym in Sheffield, South Yorkshire, England

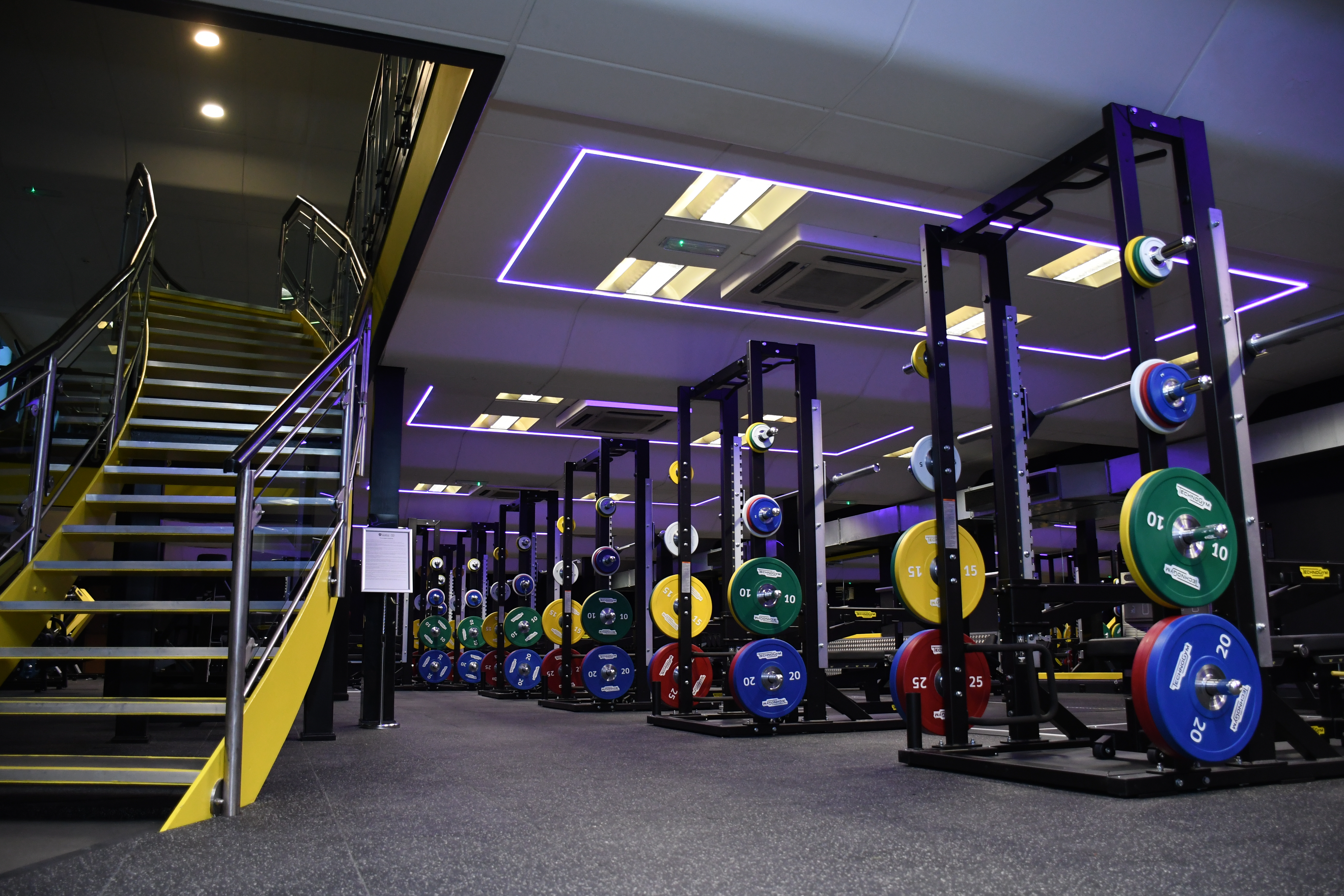
- The gym at Goodwin Sports Centre
- Interactive map of Goodwin Sports Centre
- Location: Broomhill, Sheffield
- Coordinates: 53.380556°N 1.495833°W
- Owner: University of Sheffield
- Operator: UoS Sport
- Public transit: B Y University of Sheffield

Construction
- Opened: 1960
- Expanded: 1963, renovated 2001 and 2023.

Goodwin Sports Centre is a sporting facility and gym in the Crookesmoor area of the city of Sheffield, South Yorkshire, England. Its facilities include a multi-use games area, gym, sports hall and several synthetic pitches. It is owned by the University of Sheffield.

== Facilities ==
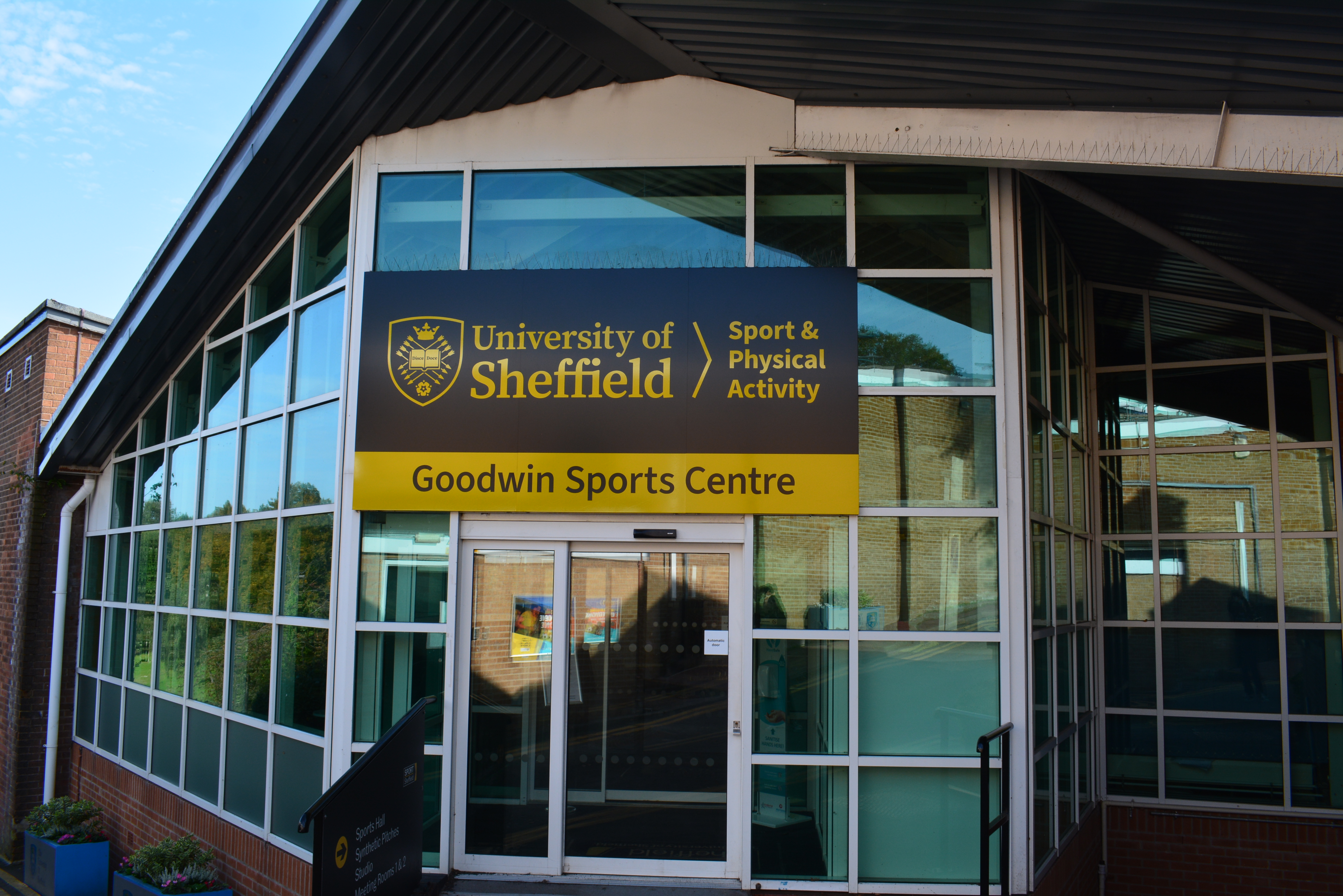
Main entrance for Goodwin South Building

The Goodwin Sports Centre consists of a range of indoor facilities in two buildings - one housing a gym and squash courts, the other housing an indoor sports hall and other facilities. The complex has two full size astroturf pitches, 3 small sided synthetic pitches and a multi use games area.

The facilities are used by members of the general public as well as university staff and students. University teams compete both at an internal level and within the British Universities and Colleges Sport leagues. A number of non-university teams and clubs play or train at Goodwin.

== History ==
The facilities were largely constructed in the 1960s, funded by the head of the Neepsend Tool and Steel Corporation, Sir Stuart Goodwin. He approached the university with £30,000 of financial support towards building a sports hall after discovering that the existing gymnasium on the Western Bank part of the campus would be demolished. They were opened in October 1960. After funding the indoor sports hall, Goodwin then discovered that there was no swimming facility at the university (plans had been abandoned in 1939) and issued a further £60,000 from himself and his wife to fund the construction. At the opening ceremony for the pool, he surprised people further by pledging to fund squash courts and indoor cricket wickets. The swimming pool and second gymnasium opened in 1963.

The swimming pool was later named the Cofield Swimming Pool, after "Sarge Cofield", the manager of university athletics for several years, on his retirement in 1967.

During the 2001/2002 academic year, the facilities were improved at a cost of £6 million, and the gym facilities renamed S10 Health. This is when additional 5-a-side synthetic pitches were added, along with the aerobics area and indoor climbing arena. This was also when the 'USport' body was created, an organisation with input from the University of Sheffield and the University of Sheffield Students' Union. The facilities were opened up to members of the public, and membership fees were charged - including fees for students - for the first time. USport was renamed to Sport Sheffield in 2012. Sport Sheffield was rebranded University of Sheffield Sport & Physical Activity in August 2023.

In August 2023, Sport Sheffield announced the indefinite closure of the 33m pool due to structural problems. The university published proposals for replacement facilities in February 2026. The proposed Sports Centre would house a new swimming pool, gym, sports hall, and squash courts on the site of the current 5-a-side synthetic pitches and be accessed from Witham Road.

== Location ==
Goodwin is located roughly halfway up Northumberland Road off the A57 in the Crookesmoor part of Broomhill.

The pitches sit on top of former water reservoirs: The sports pitches on Whitham Road opposite Weston Park Hospital are the site of Godfrey Dam, built in 1790 and extended in 1853. On the opposite side of Northumberland Road was New Dam built in 1787 and enlarged in 1809. Nearer Crookesmoor Road alongside Narrow Walk were Ralphs and Misfortune Dams, with Butchers Dam on the opposite side of Northumberland Road.
