= Broomhill and Sharrow Vale =

Electoral ward in the City of Sheffield, South Yorkshire, England

Coordinates: 53.376775°N 1.502273°W

- Shown within Sheffield
- Population: 16,966
- Metropolitan borough: City of Sheffield
- Metropolitan county: South Yorkshire
- Region: Yorkshire and the Humber
- Country: England
- Sovereign state: United Kingdom
- UK Parliament: Sheffield Central
- Councillors: Brian Holmshaw (Green Party); Maleki Haybe (Green); Angela Argenzio (Green)

Broomhill and Sharrow Vale — which includes the districts of Broomhill, Broomhall, Crookesmoor, Endcliffe, Sharrow Vale and Tapton Hill — is one of the 28 electoral wards in City of Sheffield, England. The ward was created following the 2015 local government boundary review out of parts of the old Broomhill, Central and Nether Edge wards. It is located in the western part of the city. The population of the Broomhill ward in 2011 was 16,966 people in 5,708 households, covering an area of 2.7 km^{2}. Broomhill & Sharrow Vale is one of the wards that make up the Sheffield Central Parliamentary Constituency.

== History ==
According to E. Wilkinson: "Most of what is now Broomhill was used as the Crookesmoor Racecourse from 1711 to 1781, the races only being discontinued when the commons of Ecclesall Bierlow were enclosed between 1778 and 1789. Part of Broomhill lay in Nether Hallam, the common land of which was enclosed in 1791. (The parts lying in Nether Hallam are from the north side of Whitham Road to the east side of Crookes Road, and from the bottom of Endcliffe Crescent, Endcliffe Vale Road, Endcliffe Avenue, Oakholme Road, Westbourne Road from below the old Radio Sheffield building and No. 27, Southbourne Road and the north side of Clarkehouse Road from the bottom of Southbourne Road to Brocco Bank.)

There were a few houses within this area, some of them encroachments on the common land, and a huddle of cottages to the east of the present Botanical Gardens, including an inn "The Ball in the Tree", demolished in 1870. The suburb takes its name from the house built by William Newbould on land to the east of Newbould Lane in 1792, to which he gave the name of "Broomhill", for the simple reason that it was the first house above Broomhall, and was on a hill.

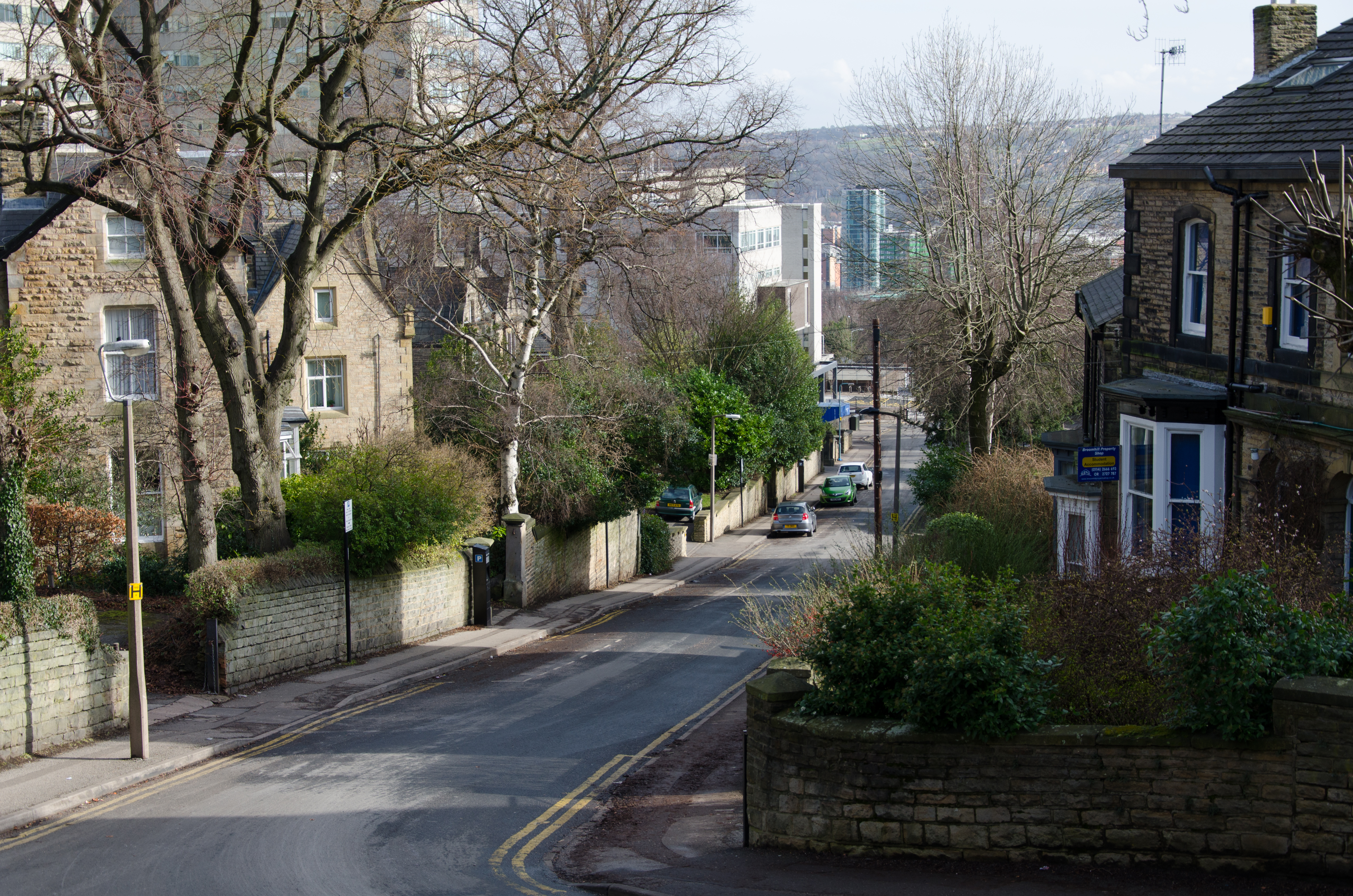
Broomhill, Sheffield (looking east along Beech Hill Road)

A few more large houses with considerable grounds were built during the next 30 years, but the real beginning of Broomhill was when the turnpike road to Glossop was opened in 1821. Terraces as well as bigger houses followed the road and the first back-to-back houses were built in Peel Street in 1827. Houses also crept down from Crookes as far as Hoole Road, this area being known as Mount Pisgah, a pun on the biblical reference of Moses viewing the holy land from there, since all the land that could be seen to the east was owned by the Holy family. By the early 1830s Broomhill had five public houses, the Ball, Broomhill Tavern, Fox & Duck, Southseas and the Travellers Inn plus a few shops. Whilst growth was steady, the 1840s were years of depression and growth only really resumed in the 1850s when the land above and along Fulwood Road was developed. Most of the former household names in the steel and cutlery industry lived or passed through Broomhill, as did many of the founders of the stores in town, brewers, solicitors and medical practitioners. There was always a fairly substantial population of artisans and small shopkeepers, to service the bigger houses. The shopping centre was the best suburban one and probably reached its peak during the Second World War when several stores and shops that had been bombed out in the city came to Broomhill, the foremost being John Walsh Ltd., which moved into the Mount.

The district inspired the former poet laureate Sir John Betjeman to write a poem entitled 'An Edwardian Sunday, Broomhill, Sheffield' which draws on the large stone houses, steel industry and hilly landscapes of the city.

Most of the Halls of Residence of the University of Sheffield are in the area, and it is also home to many other students in privately owned accommodation. One property that is now a student residence, "Fairholme", 18 Oakholme Road, was a large private house converted during the Second World War for human experimentation on conscientious objectors by the Sorby Research Institute. 'Oakbourne' at 26 Oakholme Road was used from 1940-41 as the HQ for Sheffield and Rotherham Army Command. Considerable bomb damage occurred in the street behind - Westbourne Road - during the December 1940 Sheffield Blitz. The name 'Broomhill' is often taken to refer to the parade of shops on Fulwood Road which includes Sheffield's oldest independent cafe Vittles, a collection of takeaways, four pubs, a Morrisons supermarket and many other local shops and banks.

A concise and detailed history of Broomhill can be found on the Independent Broomhill website History of Broomhill, Sheffield S10 created by Jonathan Bagge.

== Districts of Broomhill and Sharrow Vale ward ==
=== Broomhill ===
Fulwood Road shopping mall, Broomhill, Sheffield

Broomhill (grid reference SK333869) is a western suburb of Sheffield. Largely developed in the nineteenth century, its prominent buildings include Broomhill Church, The Mount and King Edward VII School, the latter two listed buildings both designed by William Flockton. The area lies west of the main campus of the University of Sheffield and has a large student population, including popular areas such as Parkers Road, and was identified in 2003 as the highest ranking area outside London for overall wealth.

The centre of Broomhill is a conservation area, while numerous hospitals and the Sheffield Botanical Gardens lie on its borders. In January 1981, the Yorkshire Ripper, Peter Sutcliffe, was arrested on the district's Melbourne Avenue, which runs through the middle of Sheffield High School. The 2011 Census recorded the area's population as 1,943.

=== Broomhall ===
Broomhall (grid reference SK342865) is a district of Sheffield to the west of the city centre. It occupies the land that once belonged to Broom Hall, a historic mansion still in existence today, which dates from at least the 15th century when it was the principal residence of the Swift family, who had inherited from the Wickersleys. In 1791, the hall was owned by the reverend James Wilkinson, vicar of Sheffield, when it was attacked and set on fire by a mob rioting against the Enclosure of land act.

In 1973, David Mellor began manufacturing his own cutlery designs here. To house his factory he renovated a large historic mansion, Broom Hall. The building was then derelict. The machines were moved into the extensive Georgian wing. The conversion of the building received a European Architectural Heritage Award. As well as introducing new concepts in cutlery he rethought the traditional methods of production. Workers in the Sheffield cutlery industry had up to then specialised in a single operation, but he introduced a new system whereby his cutlery makers rotate from task to task, increasing job satisfaction through a sense of involvement in the project as a whole.

The Broomhall Park Association was formed in 1967 by residents living in Broomhall who wanted to ensure that - at a time when the area was threatened with unrestricted developments - the special character of Broomhall was maintained and enhanced for the future. Broomhall is close to the University of Sheffield and is a diverse area, mixing larger houses and student accommodation. Parts of it once had a reputation for being a red-light district some years ago and it is now home to a large Somali community. It has local transport connections to Meadowhall, Hillsborough, Stannington and Chapeltown.

=== Crookesmoor ===
Crookesmoor (grid reference SK338877) lies immediately north of the University of Sheffield's main campus housing the University's Crookesmoor library, S10 Gym and sports centre, east of Crookes and south of Walkley. A residential area, it consists largely of terraced houses, has a significant student population and is home to Crookes Valley Park which also includes the Dam House. This park contains a lake, the last in what was a chain of reservoirs.

A racecourse lay in Crookesmoor from at least 1711 until 1781, when the land was enclosed. The racecourse had a sizeable grandstand, lying near Fulwood Road.

=== Endcliffe ===
Endcliffe (grid reference SK328863) lies south west of Broomhill and north of Hunter's Bar and is a wealthy residential area. It includes Birkdale School (a private school) and part of the "Endcliffe Student Village", containing brand new flats, as well as old halls of residence, all owned by the University of Sheffield. The suburb contains the 36 room mansion Endcliffe Hall built for the steel magnate John Brown in the 1860s.

=== Sharrow Vale ===
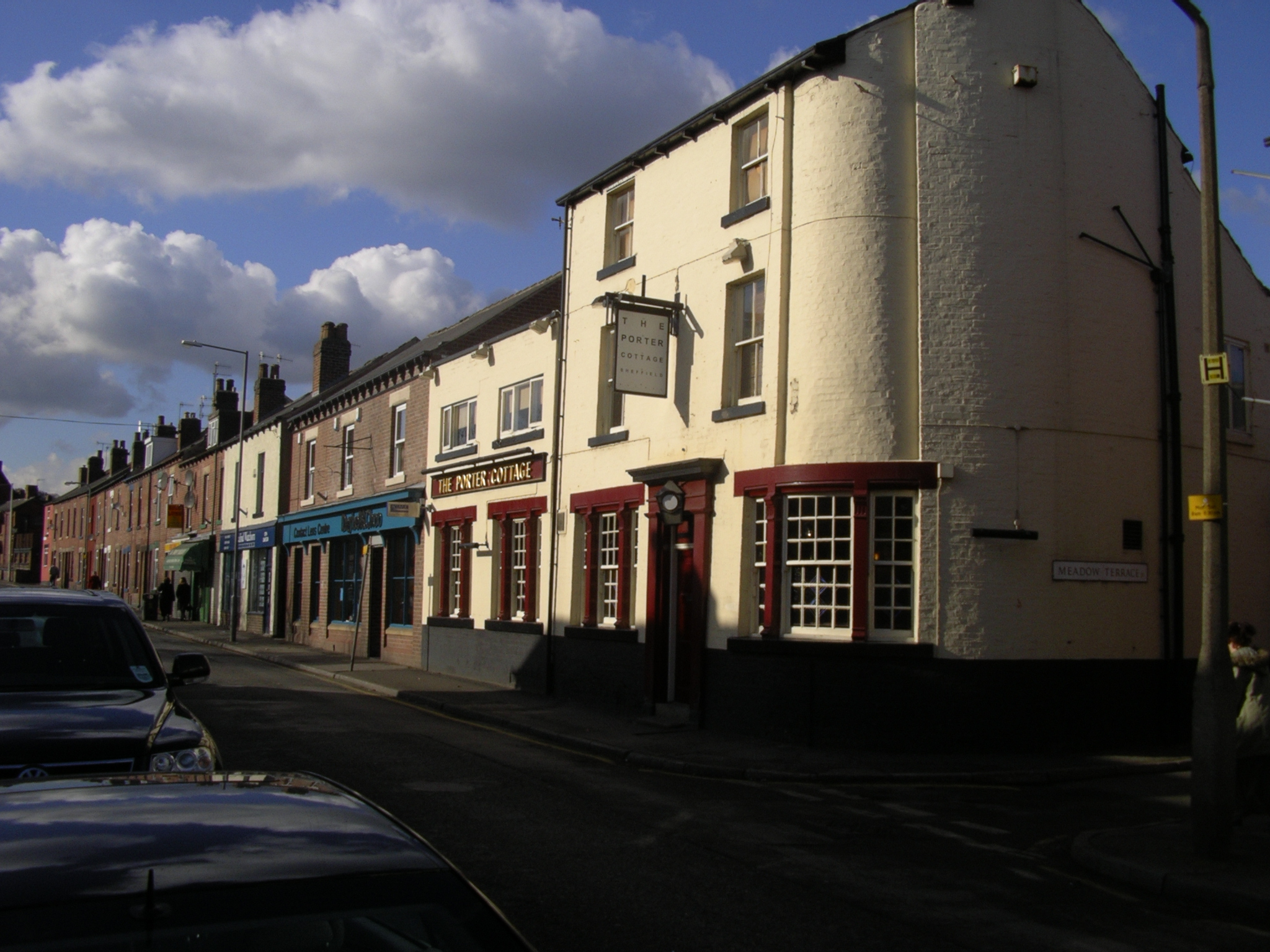
Sharrow Vale Road

Sharrow Vale (grid reference SK336858) is a district in the southwestern portion of Sheffield. It straddles the Porter Brook and Ecclesall Road (A625). Hunter's Bar, at the junction of Ecclesall Road, Brocco Bank, Sharrow Vale Road and Junction Road, was formerly a toll bar on the 18th century Sheffield to Hathersage Turnpike — the toll house is long gone but the toll gate can still be seen. To the north of this neighbourhood is the Sheffield Botanical Gardens, and the historic Sheffield General Cemetery lies to the east. To the west is Endcliffe Park, the first in a series of parks that follow the Porter Brook out of Sheffield.

=== Tapton Hill ===
Tapton Hill is a district of the suburb of Crosspool. The Tapton Hill transmitting station and Tapton Hall are located here.
