= Transport in Sheffield =

Transport in English city

Map showing Sheffield's major roads and railways

Transport in Sheffield, England is developed around the city's unusual topography and medieval street plan. Once an isolated town, the transport infrastructure changed dramatically in the 19th and 20th centuries. The city now has road and rail links with the rest of the country, and road, bus and trams for local transport.

== National and international travel ==
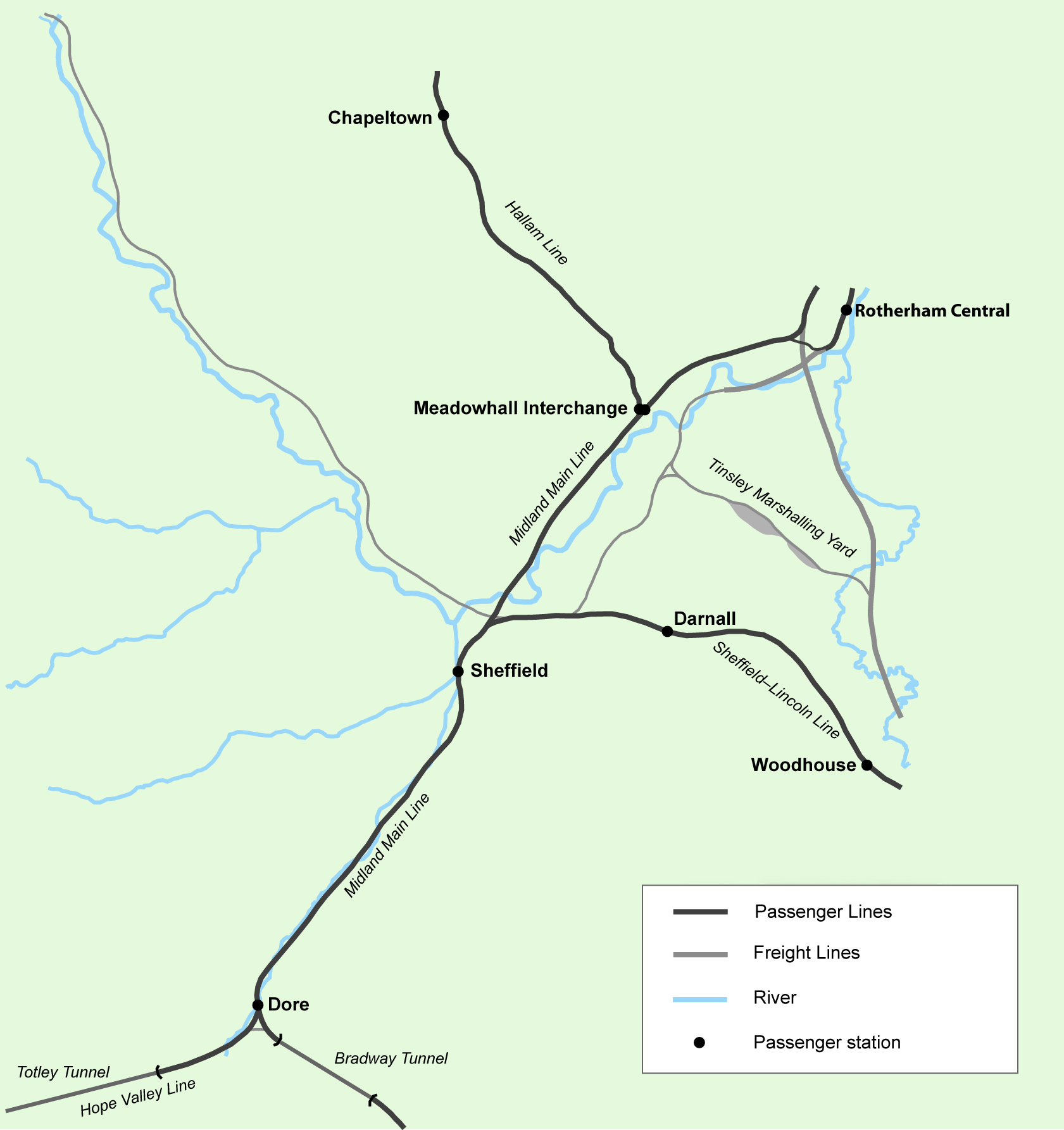
Railways in Sheffield (2005)

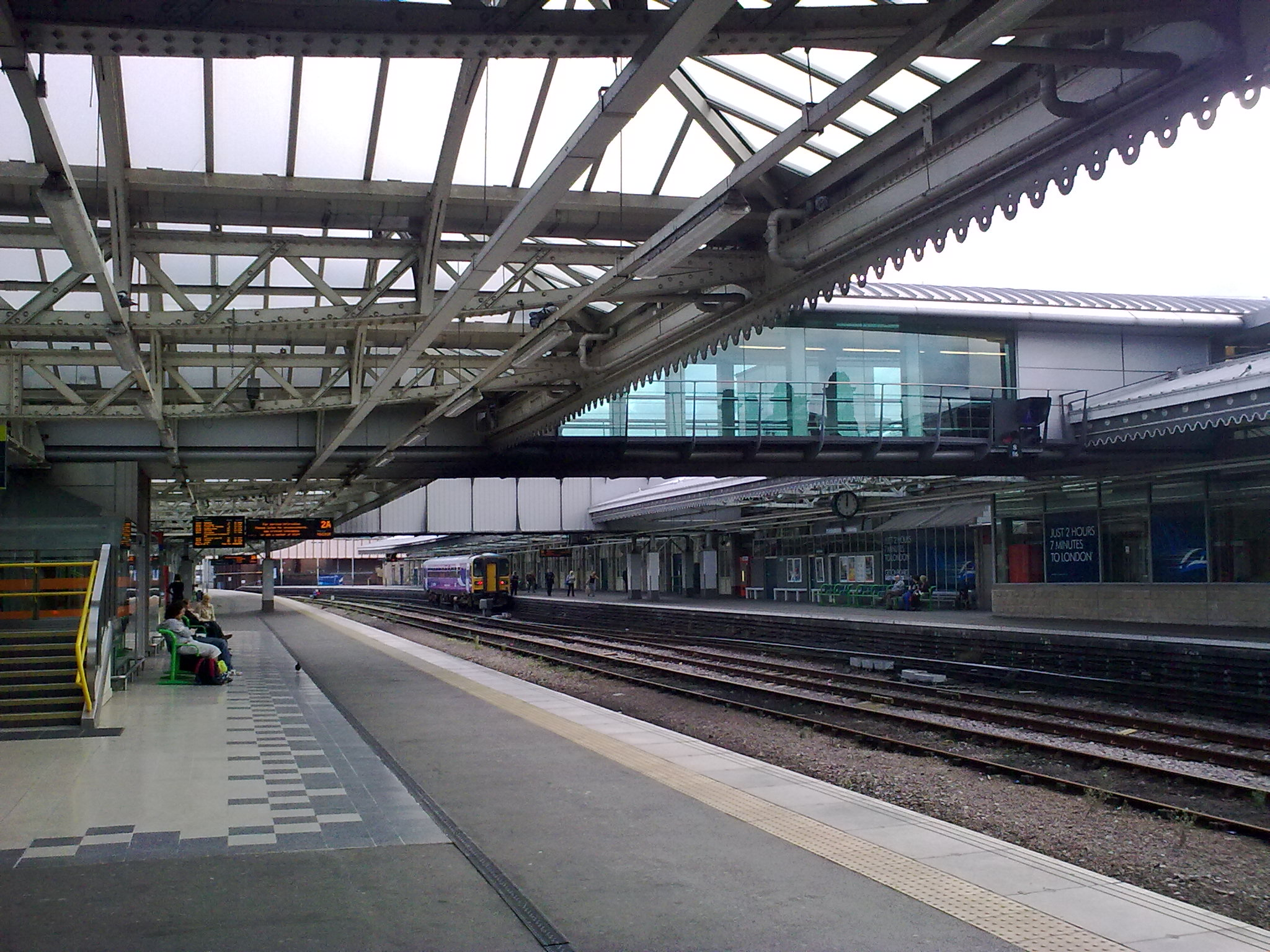
Interior of Sheffield station. The newly built bridge connecting the platforms to the concourse is also visible.

Sheffield is linked into the national motorway network via the M1 and M18 motorways. The M1 skirts the north-east of the city, linking Sheffield with London to the south and Leeds to the north; the M18 branches from the M1 close to Sheffield, linking the city with Doncaster and the Humber ports. The Sheffield Parkway connects the city centre with the motorways. There are eight park and ride sites for motorists visiting the city, three of them close to M1 junctions and offering connections to local public transport.

The topography of Sheffield makes it unsuitable for a large rail system. The Midland Main Line is the major railway through Sheffield, running in approximately a south-west to north-easterly direction. Other routes passing through the city include the Cross Country Route, the Penistone Line, the Dearne Valley Line, the Hope Valley Line, and the Hallam Line. The major station serving the city, Sheffield station, is on the south-eastern edge of the city centre. There is another major rail station at Meadowhall and four smaller suburban stations at Chapeltown, Darnall, Dore & Totley and Woodhouse. Passenger rail services through Sheffield are provided by CrossCountry, East Midlands Railway, Northern and TransPennine Express.

Two airports serving Sheffield opened and closed since the 1990s. Sheffield City Airport, located in the Tinsley suburb 3 miles (4.8 km) east of the city centre, opened in 1997 but served its last commercial flight in 2002 and had its CAA licence revoked in 2008; it is now the site of a business park. The larger Doncaster Sheffield Airport, located 18 miles (29 km) east of the city centre at Finningley, opened on 28 April 2005 with the first flight to Palma de Mallorca, but closure of the airport was announced on 26 September 2022, with the last arrival on 4 November. Air travellers to and from Sheffield now take flights from Manchester Airport, Leeds Bradford Airport and East Midlands Airport, all within a 90-minute drive from the city.

London St Pancras station, the terminus of the Midland Main Line, connects with Eurostar services to Europe.

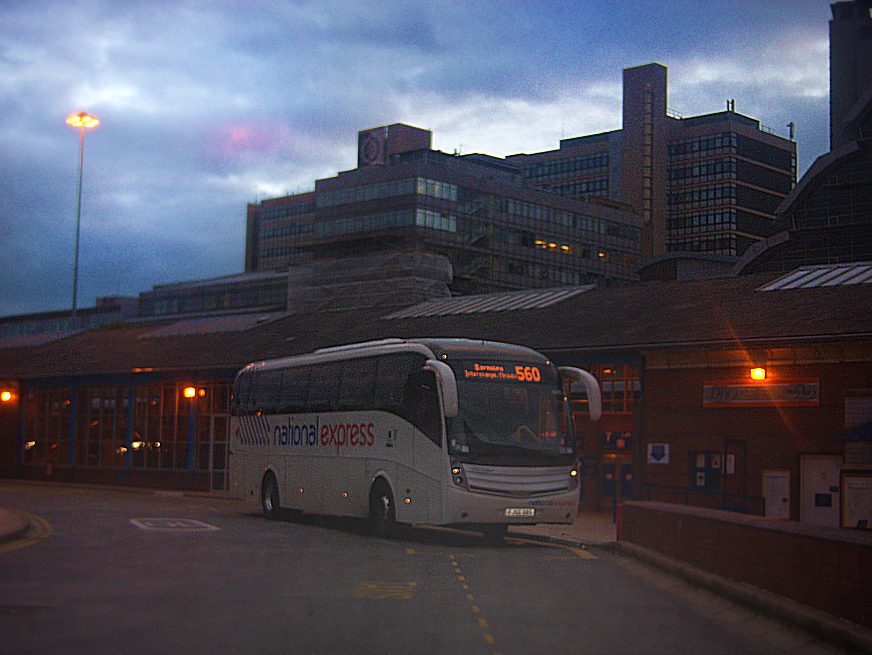
A National Express coach on route 560 arriving at Sheffield Interchange

Sheffield is also served by a number of coach services. National Express provides most services, using Sheffield Interchange, Meadowhall Interchange and Meadowhead Bus stop as pick up/drop off points. Sheffield Interchange handles most services and is the start point/terminus for a number of them. Sheffield is connected to London Victoria Coach Station by the 560 - 564 services, with Sheffield serving as the terminus/starting point on some occasions (on others, it will be Rotherham, Barnsley, Leeds or Halifax).

Being at the confluence of several natural waterways, the development of a canal system marked an important evolution in the city's transport network, initially for commercial use and, more recently, for leisure activities. The Sheffield and South Yorkshire Navigation (S&SY) is a system of navigable inland waterways (canals and canalised rivers) in Yorkshire and Lincolnshire, England.

Chiefly based on the River Don, it runs for a length of 43 miles (69 km) and has 29 locks. It connects Sheffield, Rotherham, and Doncaster with the River Trent at Keadby and (via the New Junction Canal) the Aire and Calder Navigation.

== Travel data ==
Trips in Sheffield, Sheffield City Council monitoring, 2017
Mode	Share	Trips per day
Car/taxi	57.1%	504,898
Bus/coach	15.4%	135,768
Walk	7.2%	63,953
Light goods vehicle	7.2%	63,753
Tram	5.8%	50,952
Rail	4.4%	38,628
Medium goods vehicle	1.1%	9,969
Cycle	0.8%	6,718
Heavy goods vehicle	0.7%	6,382
Motorcycle	0.4%	3,696

=== Car and van ownership ===
67% of households in Sheffield have access to a car or van. This ranks 45th lowest access of 348 local authorities in England and Wales.

Ownership is unequally distributed across the city, from 40% of households in Central ward having at least one vehicle, to 87% in Ecclesall ward.

== Local travel ==
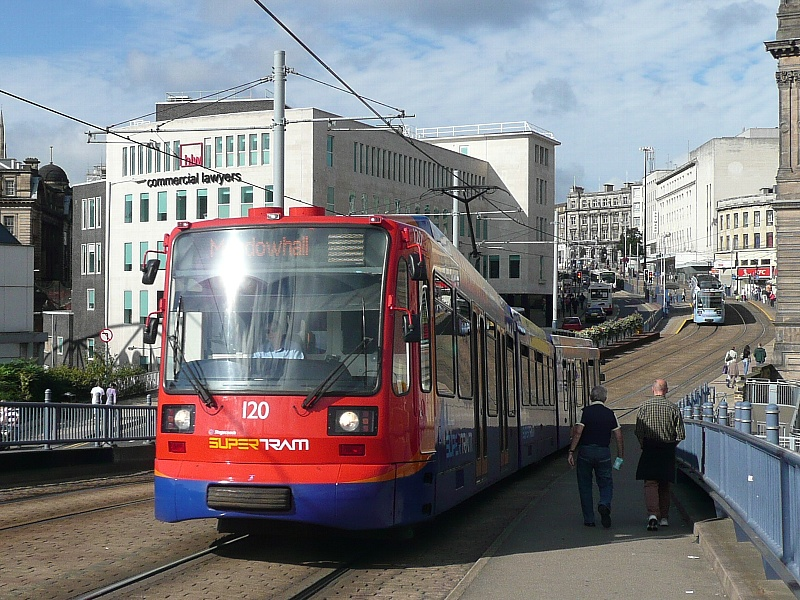
A Sheffield Supertram

=== Roads ===
The A57 and A61 roads are the major trunk roads through Sheffield. These run east–west and north–south, respectively, crossing in the city centre. Other major roads generally radiate spoke-like from the city centre. An inner ring road, mostly constructed in the 1970s and extended to form a complete ring in 2007–2008, allows traffic to avoid the city centre, and an outer "ring road" runs around the eastern edge of the city. The inner ring-road follows St Mary's Road, Upper Hanover Street and then traverses Netherthorpe, to reach Shalesmoor. The Sheffield Outer Ring Road follows much of Prince of Wales Road from 'Arena Square' in Carbrook to Greenhill at Greenhill roundabout where it joins the A61.

Sheffield City Council is belatedly introducing a clean air zone from early 2023, after delaying the plans in 2020. Some polluting taxis and vans will be charged £10/day to enter the city, while buses and HGVs which do not meet the standards will be charged £50/day. The charge would apply to vehicles within the ring road which do not meet Euro 4 standards for petrol and Euro 6 standards for diesel.

=== Public transport ===
Public transport is provided by trams and buses. The Tramway system is known as the Sheffield Supertram. It was constructed in the early 1990s, with the first section opening in 1994 and consists of three spokes that run from the city centre out to Hillsborough, Halfway, and Meadowhall Centre.

A sizeable bus infrastructure operates from a main hub at Sheffield Interchange. Other bus stations lie at Meadowhall, Hillsborough, and Crystal Peaks.

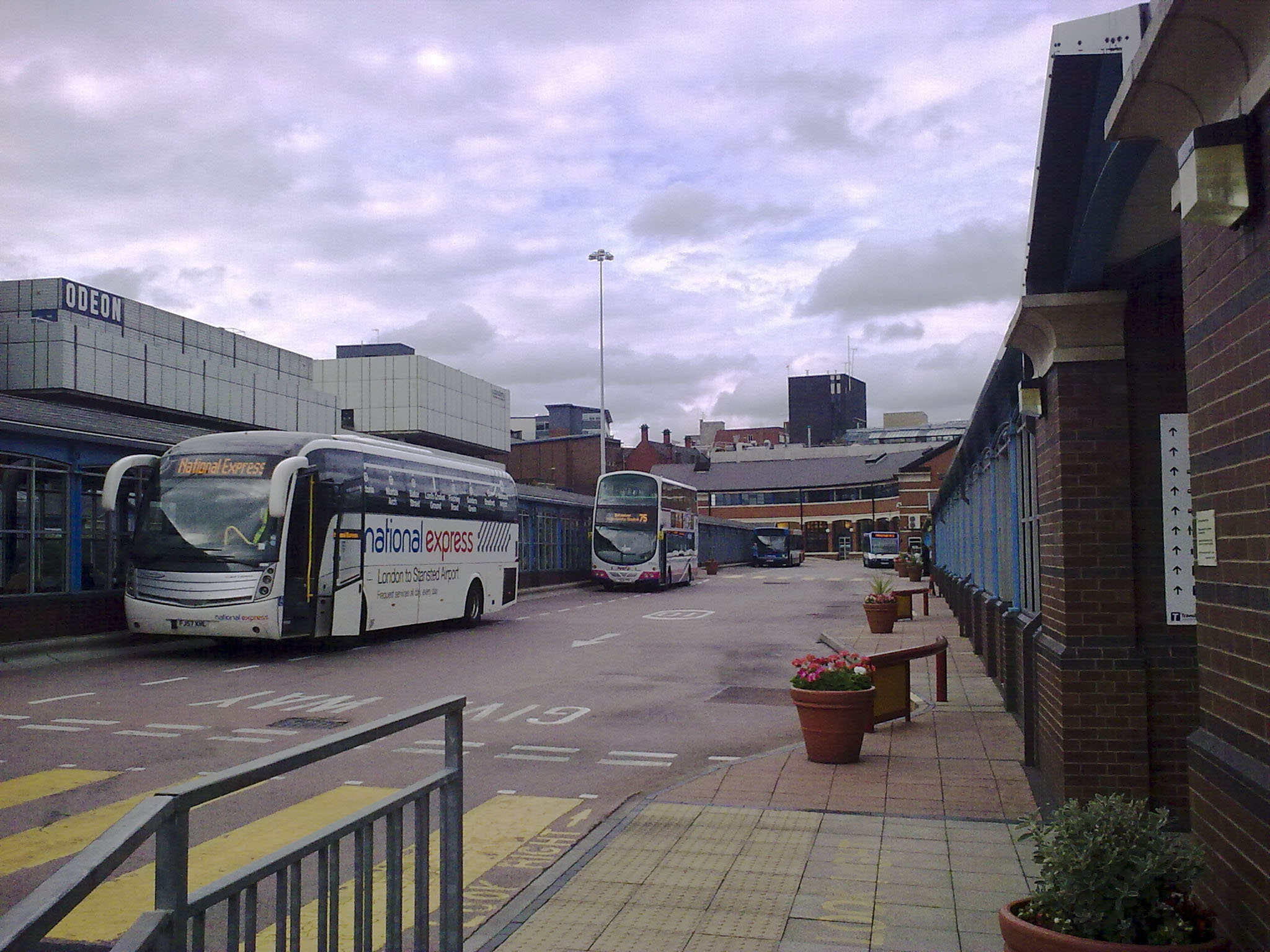
Sheffield Interchange

A flurry of new operators were created after deregulation in the 1980s. The majority of these gradually amalgamated, leaving First South Yorkshire (formerly Mainline and First Mainline) owned by to operate most of the city's buses up until December 2005, when Stagecoach took over Yorkshire Traction (which had previously taken over Yorkshire Terrier, creating Stagecoach Sheffield). Stagecoach Yorkshire, Stagecoach in Chesterfield, Stagecoach in Mansfield, Veolia Transport (Operating for Travel South Yorkshire), Sheffield Community Transport, Hulleys of Baslow, Powell's Co, K&H Doyle also operating bus routes in the city. A city centre free bus service also runs every 7 minutes, known as the FreeBee.

There is also the Bus Rapid Transit North route between Sheffield and Maltby via Rotherham. In 2008, the bus rapid transit scheme was approved by the Yorkshire and Humber Assembly's Regional Transport Board and there were plans for two routes; one (the Northern route) to Rotherham via Meadowhall and Templeborough, and the other via the developing employment centre and Waverley. The route between Sheffield and Maltby was approved in 2013 with construction commencing in January 2014, involving the construction of the new 800m Tinsley Road Link between Meadowhall and the A6178 road. The route opened in September 2016.

Travel South Yorkshire, the current (as of 2023) transport body serving Sheffield, lists eight park and ride sites for the city; all of them are outside tram stops or railway stations.

=== Cycling ===
For cycling, although the city has a more undulating topography, Sheffield is compact. It is on the Trans-Pennine Trail, a National Cycle Network route running from Southport in the north-west to Hornsea in the East Riding, and has a developing Strategic Cycle Network within the city. Sheffield is close to the Peak District National Park, an area popular with both on and off-road cyclists.

== History ==
=== Early history ===
The earliest known roads in the Sheffield area date from the Roman occupation of Britain between 43 and 410 AD. The Romans built a fort at Templeborough c55. Two roads were built to this fort. Icknield Street ran south towards Derby, and another road ran south-west to Brough-on-Noe near Hope in Derbyshire. The exact course of these roads is unknown but both are likely to have passed within the modern boundaries Sheffield. In the centuries after the end of the Roman occupation the Sheffield area was at the border of the Anglo-Saxon kingdoms of Northumbria and Mercia. The village of Dore (literally a Door) lay on an important route between these kingdoms.

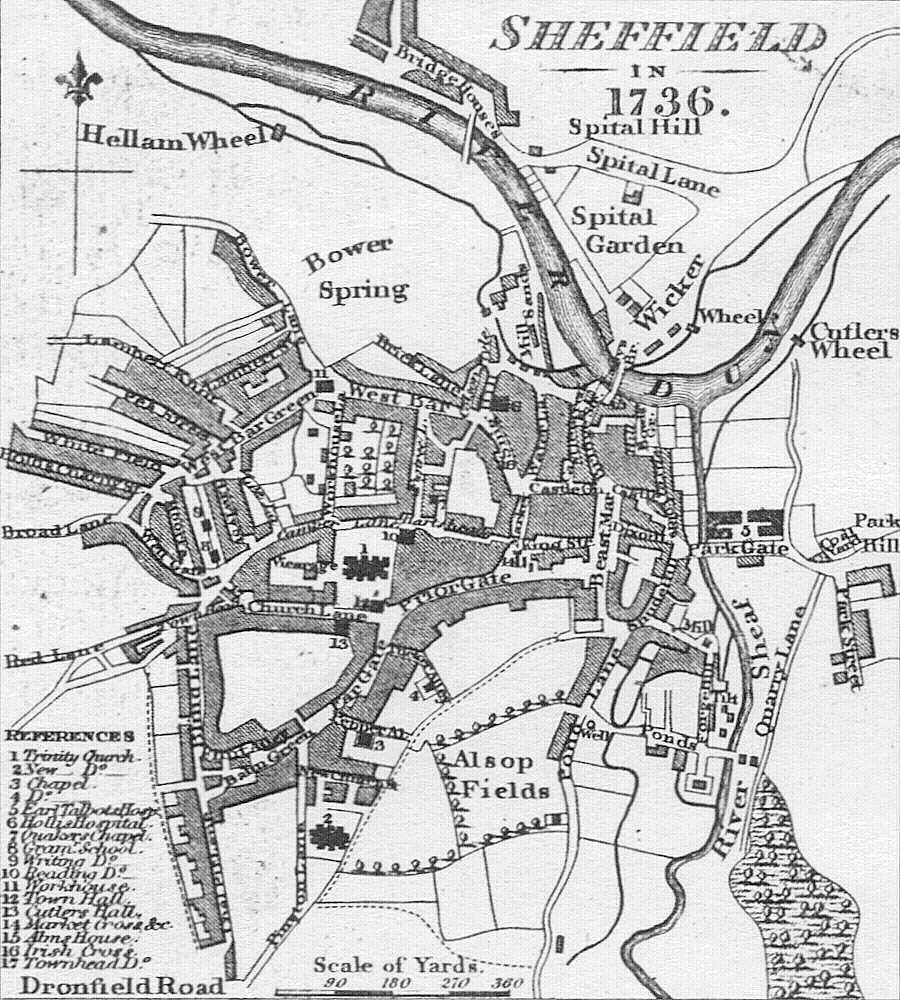
A map of Sheffield in 1736

Following the Norman Conquest of England a castle was established in the village of Sheffield c1150. Sheffield began to grow into a small town, the first bridge was built over the River Don (Lady's Bridge) and the street pattern that would persist for centuries was laid out. Lady's Bridge may represent the main route out of Sheffield in this era, travellers followed the Wicker and then climbed Spital Hill to follow an ancient Dyke called the "Roman Rig" to Mexborough. This may be the route into Sheffield described in Sir Walter Scott's Ivanhoe. A route to the south passing through Little Sheffield, Heeley, and Newfield Green, to Gleadless Moor existed by 1692, but was a difficult route to follow. There was also a route to the west, known as Long Causeway, that followed the old Roman Road toward Stanage Edge, however Sheffield remained relatively secluded, a fact which may have influenced the choice of Sheffield for the imprisonment of Mary, Queen of Scots, in 1570.

In the 18th century, turnpike roads were built improving Sheffield's connections with the outside world. A turnpike to Chesterfield was built in 1756 and another through Ringinglow to Chapel-en-le-Frith or Buxton was constructed in 1758. Roads were also built to Barnsley, Tickhill, Worksop, Intake and Penistone. The Baslow turnpike (Abbeydale Road) opened in 1805 and Glossop Road opened in 1821. In 1774 a wooden waggonway was laid over a distance of 2 miles from the Duke of Norfolk's collieries into the town, this was later relaid with cast-iron L-shaped rails by John Curr; one of the earliest railways to use this type of rails.

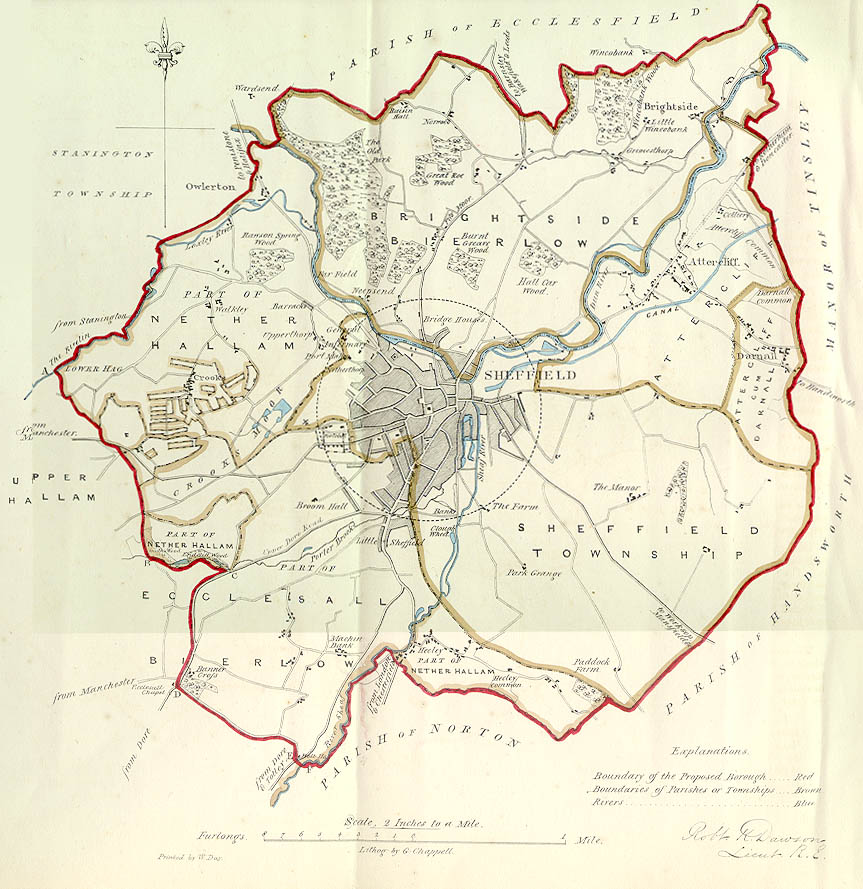
A map of Sheffield in 1832

=== 19th century ===
The opening of the Sheffield Canal in 1819 opened Sheffield to the large-scale transportation of freight. This was followed by the Sheffield and Rotherham Railway in 1838, with Sheffield's first railway station opening at the Wicker. The first main line railway station in Sheffield was opened in 1845 at Bridgehouses by the Sheffield, Ashton-under-Lyne and Manchester Railway. This line was extended to a new station, Sheffield Victoria in 1851, and Wicker station was replaced by Sheffield Midland in 1870. A horse tramway opened from Lady's Bridge to Attercliffe in 1873, this was later extended to Brightside and Tinsley. Further horse tramway routes were constructed to Hillsborough, Heeley, and Nether Edge. There was an unsuccessful trial of Steam trams in 1877 and 1878. Due to the narrow medieval roads the tramways were initially banned from the town centre. An improvement scheme was passed in 1875, this led to the first major alterations to the medieval street plan, Pinstone Street and Leopold Street were constructed by 1879 and Fargate was widened in the 1880s. The 1875 plan also called for the widening of High Street, but disputes with property owners delayed this until 1895.

The S&SY Navigation company was formed in 1888 with the intention of purchasing all of the waterways which were then owned by Manchester, Sheffield and Lincolnshire Railway. After seven years of negotiation, this was accomplished in 1895, and the navigation was formed by the amalgamation of the component waterways which included the Stainforth and Keadby Canal, the River Don Navigation, and the Sheffield and Tinsley Canal.

=== 20th century to the present ===
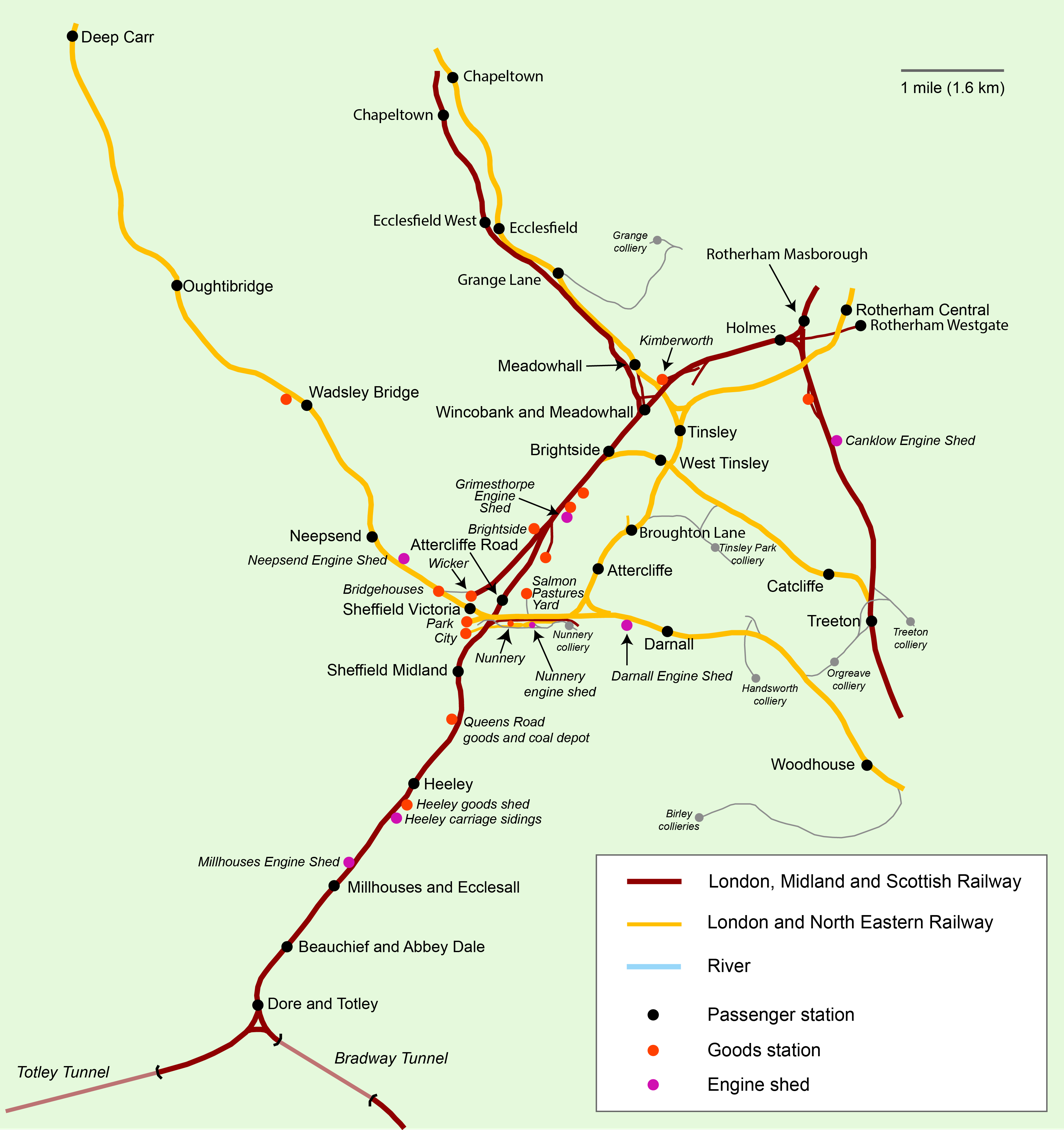
Railways in Sheffield (1930)

Before the electric trams started taking over the old horse omnibus routes across Sheffield, there were many Cab and Carriage Proprietors in Sheffield that offered omnibus services from the districts of Sheffield, which included Joseph Tomlinson & Sons Ltd. who were pioneers in local transportation and were renowned across the districts for their fine horses and carriages, in which they built in their own factories. The first electric tram route ran from Nether Edge to Tinsley, opening in 1899. The electrification of the rest of the system followed soon after, and the last horse tram ran in 1902. In 1910 Sheffield tram routes covered a total of 39 miles, subsequent extensions would increase this to 48 miles by 1951. Tram routes started to be abandoned and be replaced by buses from 1952. When the last public service tram ran from Leopold Street to Beauchief on 8 October 1960 the occasion was marked with a parade of 15 trams (three of which are now preserved at the National Tramway Museum in Crich). The Beeching cuts led to the closure of the Great Central Railway route to London Marylebone in 1966, followed by the Woodhead line to Manchester Piccadilly in 1970. This left Victoria station obsolete; it closed on 5 January 1970 and the station buildings were demolished in 1989, leaving the Wicker Arches on which it stood standing. Proposals for a new tram system first appeared in the 1970s. After much deliberation routes were selected and construction of the new system, named Sheffield Supertram started in 1991. The first line, running from Castle Square to Meadowhall opened on 21 March 1994.

South Yorkshire County Council (SYCC) was created in 1974, comprising several neighbouring metropolitan boroughs; Sheffield, Barnsley, Doncaster and Rotherham. The metropolitan county councils created at this time, were given the responsibility for the provision of public transport. In the case of the SYCC this was allocated to the new South Yorkshire Passenger Transport Executive (SYPTE) that assumed control of the former local corporation bus fleets and also took on a coordinating role regarding the services provided by other bus operators and by British Rail in their region, in addition to becoming the highway authority for the area. During this period bus services received a subsidy of up to 85% of operating costs, and low fares contributed to an increase in bus travel of 7% from 1974–1984, compared with a 30% decline elsewhere in the United Kingdom.

The metropolitan county councils, were abolished in 1986 but, despite the disappearance of the SYCC, the SYPTE remained, under the control of a Passenger Transport Authority (SYPTA) which included the four borough councils involved. By contrast, the functions of local highway authority passed directly to each of the councils, and the Sheffield City Council (SCC) thus became the responsible for city's highways.

Deregulation of UK bus services in 1986 brought an end to the local authority's direct control of the provision of local bus services, in essence leaving the bus companies to decide where, when and how often to run services, and compete commercially with each other although SYPTE still maintains an advisory role and funds the running of some non-commercially viable routes that are considered socially essential.

== Bibliography ==
- Batty, S. (1984). Rail Centres: Sheffield. Shepperton, Surrey: Ian Allan Limited. ISBN 1-901945-21-9.
- Fox, Peter (1990). The Midland Line in Sheffield. Sheffield: Platform 5 Publishing Limited. ISBN 1-872524-16-8.
- Leader, R. E. (1906). The Highways and Byways of Old Sheffield. A lecture delivered before the Sheffield Literary and Philosophical Society. (transcription)
- Olive, Martin (1994). Images of England: Central Sheffield. Stroud: Tempus Publishing Limited. ISBN 0-7524-0011-8.
- Twidale, Graham H. E. (1995). A Nostalgic Look At Sheffield Trams Since 1950. Peterborough: Silver Link Publishing, Limited. ISBN 1-85794-040-7.
- Vickers, J. Edward MBE (1999). Old Sheffield Town. An Historical Miscellany (2nd ed.). Sheffield: The Hallamshire Press Limited. ISBN 1-874718-44-X.
- Wiseman, Richard (1997). Sheffield Trams in Colour Since 1950. Shepperton, Surrey: Ian Allan Publishing. ISBN 0-7110-2535-5.
