= Crystal Peaks =

Shopping centre and retail park in Sheffield, England

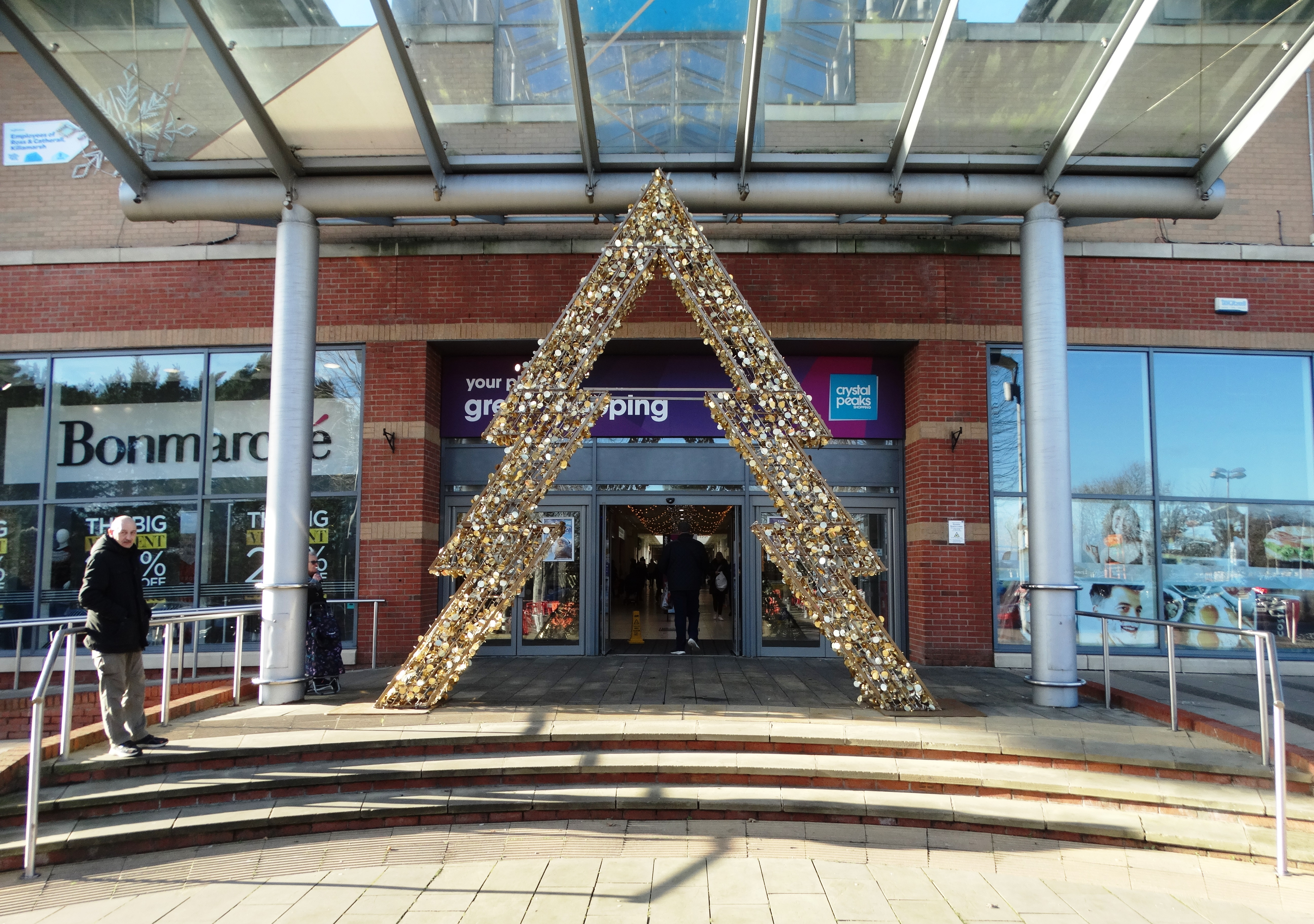
- A view of the Centre
- Location: Sheffield, England
- Coordinates: 53.342°N 1.351°W
- Opened: March 1988
- Owner: Britel Fund Trustees Ltd
- Floor area: 635,000 sq ft (59,000 m^{2}) (shopping centre) and 77,800 sq ft (7,230 m^{2}) (retail park)
- Floors: 2
- Public transit: B Crystal Peaks or Beighton / Drakehouse Lane
- Website: https://crystalpeakscentre.com/

Crystal Peaks is a shopping centre and retail park in Sheffield, South Yorkshire, England. Established in 1988, the centre attracts around 11 million visitors a year.

== Facilities ==
Crystal Peaks Shopping centre has approximately 600,000 sq ft (56,000 m^{2}) of retail space and food outlets with a range chains and a supermarket. The centre has an indoor market of smaller businesses (operated by Sheffield City Council), a medical centre, veterinary surgery, bus station as well as other facilities and services.

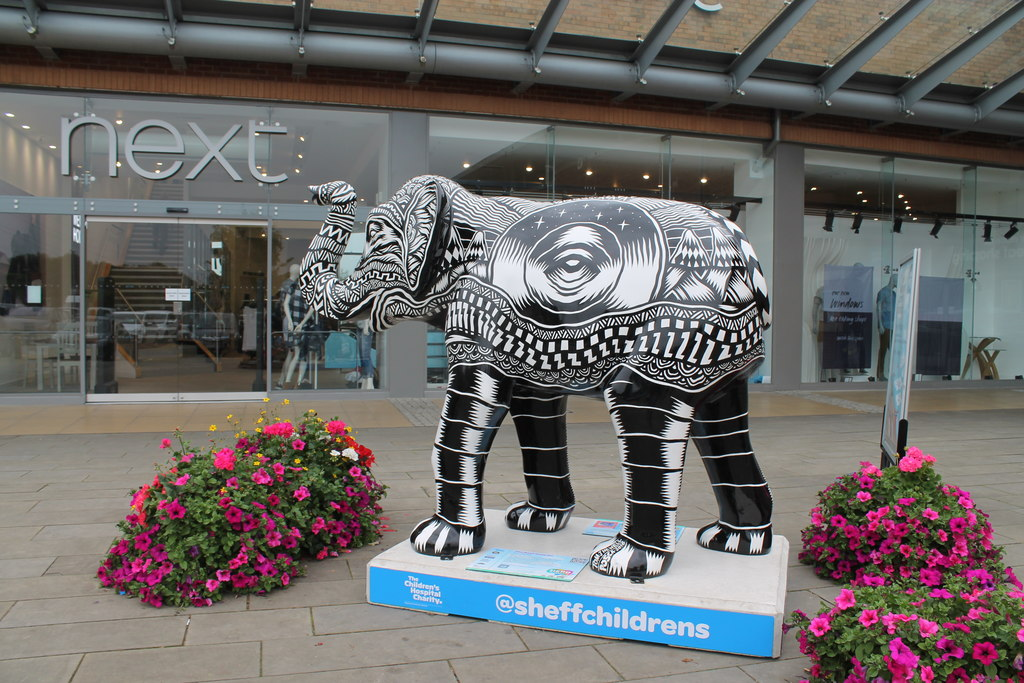
Next store

The nearby retail park has a number of larger stores, restaurants and warehouses as well as a gym. Nearby is Moss Way police station, Beighton Community Hospital and the Sheffield College Peaks Campus, the latter of which has stopped teaching activities.

== Community ==
Bee hives have been placed on the shopping centre's roof and bee-friendly flowers planted to help the local bee population, other environmental projects include the installation of swift bird boxes on the building, creating a nature reserve and supporting the village of Beighton in Britain and Yorkshire in Bloom competitions.

Crystal Peaks also has a dedicated 'charity of the year'. In 2010, the centre raised over £8,000 for Bluebell Wood Children's Hospice. The centre's adopted charity for 2011 was Macmillan Cancer Support.

== History ==
Crystal Peaks first opened in 1988, being developed in phases. Opening ceremonies attracted large crowds to see Roland Rat and then Eddie "The Eagle" Edwards do the honours. The Olympic ski jumper Edwards performed a stunt on wires from the top of the atrium above the escalators.

Originally, the centre had a central waterfall, stream, clock tower modelled lift and model railway. Sheffield's first ten screen cinema, was also part of the complex until 2003.

Since opening, the centre has developed substantially. There was a western extension in 1998. The supermarket was relocated to the in 2006 for further extensions to the north and east opened in early 2007.

Interior shots of the shopping centre were used for the 2010 film Four Lions, in which a character is depicted as working as a shopping centre security guard.

== Public transport ==
Crystal Peaks bus station
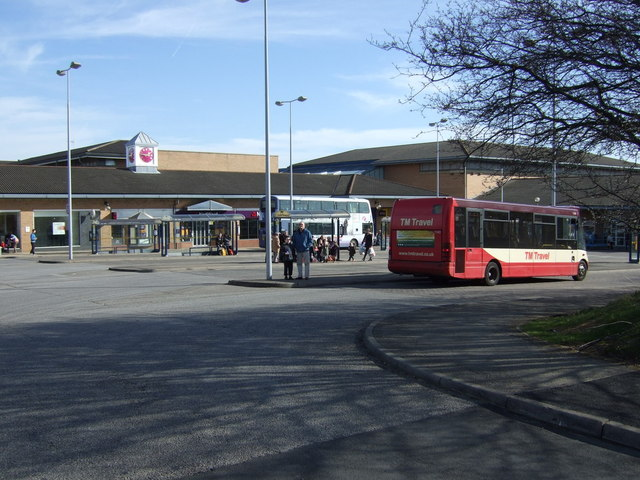

General information
- Location: Peaks Mount, Mosborough; Sheffield (S20 7JD); England
- Coordinates: 53.3418°N 1.3540°W
- Owner: Crystal Peaks Shopping Centre
- Operator: Travel South Yorkshire
- Bus stands: 8
- Bus operators: First South Yorkshire, SMT Bus and Coach Ltd, Stagecoach Yorkshire, TM Travel

Construction
- Parking: Yes (free, in shopping centre)
- Cycle facilities: Yes
- Accessible: Yes

History
- Opened: 1988
Location

=== Bus station ===
Crystal Peaks bus station is located off of Peaks Mount on the western side of the shopping centre, with a direct entrance into the shopping centre. The bus station is located nearby to the Crystal Peaks tram stop, and together provide a public transport hub for south-east Sheffield.

==== Services ====
As of July 2026, the stand allocation is:

Stand	Route	Destination
CP1	30A	Plumbley via Westfield (TM Travel)
CP1	73	Clowne via Westfield, Halfway, Eckington, Renishaw & Barlborough (Stagecoach Yorkshire)
CP1	74	Clowne via Westfield, Halfway, Killamarsh, Spinkhill, Renishaw & Barlborough (Stagecoach Yorkshire)
CP1	M55	Plumbley via Westfield & Mosborough (SMT Bus and Coach Ltd)
CP2	26	Thorpe Salvin via Swallownest, Wales Road & Kiveton Park (TM Travel)
CP2	26A	Thorpe Salvin via Sothall, Killamarsh, Norwood & Harthill (TM Travel)
CP3	252	Sheffield via Halfway, Eckington, Birk Hill, Gleadless Townend & Heeley (TM Travel)
CP3	626	Wales High School (TM Travel)
CP4	120	Halfway via Westfield (First South Yorkshire & Stagecoach Yorkshire)
CP4	120K	Killamarsh via Sothall & Norwood (First South Yorkshire)
CP5	7	Ecclesfield via Beighton, Woodhouse, Manor Top, City Road, Sheffield City Centre, Neepsend, Owlerton, Penistone Road & Wadsley Bridge (Stagecoach Yorkshire)
CP5	30	Hallamshire Hospital via Beighton, Woodhouse, Handsworth, Sheffield Parkway, Sheffield City Centre, West Street & Broomhill (TM Travel)
CP5	30A	Hallamshire Hospital via Sothall, Beighton, Woodhouse, Handsworth, Sheffield Parkway, Sheffield City Centre, West Street & Broomhill (TM Travel)
CP6	M44	Frecheville via Ochre Dike Lane, Owlthorpe, Birley Lane & Birley (SMT Bus and Coach Ltd)
CP6	M45	Frecheville via Ochre Dike Lane & Hackenthorpe (SMT Bus and Coach Ltdl)
CP7	–	No Services Allocated
CP8	120	Fulwood via Moss Way, Frecheville, Manor Top, City Road, Sheffield City Centre, West Street, Broomhill, Hallamshire Hospital & Ranmoor (First South Yorkshire & Stagecoach Yorkshire)
CP8	120K	Fulwood via Moss Way, Frecheville, Manor Top, City Road, Sheffield City Centre, West Street, Broomhill, Hallamshire Hospital & Ranmoor (First South Yorkshire)

=== Tram Stop ===
Crystal Peaks tram stop is located in Waterthorpe on the South Yorkshire Supertram system, and serves Crystal Peaks Shopping Centre and Retail Park, Drakehouse Retail Park, and Waterthorpe. It consists of two platforms.

Preceding station	South Yorkshire Supertram	Following station
Moss Way towards Malin Bridge	Blue Route	Beighton Drakehouse Lane towards Halfway

The east side of Crystal Peaks shopping centre is also served by the Beighton Drakehouse Lane tram stop, which is located behind the "Green" car park.
