= TM Travel =

Bus operator in Northern England

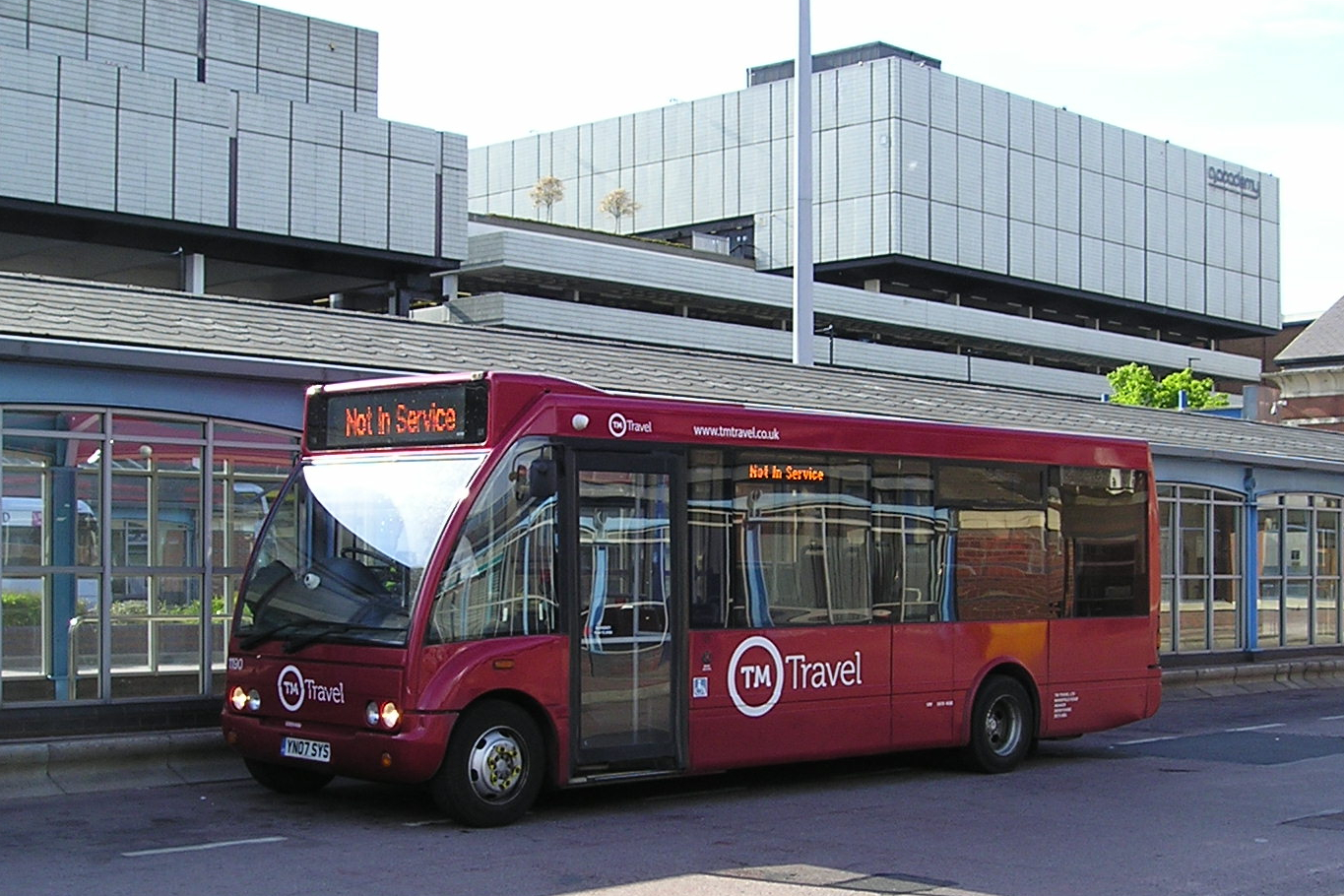
- Optare Solo at Sheffield Interchange in May 2017
- Parent: Wellglade Group
- Founded: November 1995
- Headquarters: Halfway
- Service area: Derbyshire; South Yorkshire
- Service type: Bus services
- Routes: 30 (June 2024)
- Depots: Halfway
- Fleet: 47 (June 2024)
- Website: www.tmtravel.co.uk

TM Travel is a bus operator based in Halfway, Sheffield, operating bus services in South Yorkshire and Derbyshire. Founded in 1995 as a family-owned operation with one bus, by March 2008 it had expanded to become the largest independent operator in Derbyshire. The company was taken over by the Wellglade Group in January 2010.

== History ==
TM Travel was founded in November 1995 by former Hulleys of Baslow employee Tim Watts. Their first vehicle was a Leyland Tiger coach used on coach hire operations from a depot near Chesterfield. Two similar vehicles were added to the fleet in early 1996. Two school bus services were taken on in the same year and the fleet expanded to ten vehicles. In 1997 vehicles maintenance work was taken in-house by the company, and work on National Express services was introduced.

The company moved into scheduled bus service operation in 1999, winning a contract from Derbyshire County Council. A local route in Bolsover was launched a year later. In 2004 TM Travel took over a route between Sheffield and Chesterfield previously run by Thompson Travel. A number of South Yorkshire Passenger Transport Executive contracts were won over the following few years and the fleet increased in size to over 100 vehicles, prompting a move from Staveley, Derbyshire to the former First South Yorkshire depot at Halfway.

As of March 2008, TM Travel was the largest independent coach and bus operator in Derbyshire, employing 120 staff, with all operations (including maintaining the fleet of vehicles) handled in-house. On 5 January 2010 TM Travel was sold to the Wellglade Group.

In October 2015, the company was given a formal warning by the Deputy Travel Commissioner over the performance of its services. The firm stated the single biggest problem with timetabling was with buses leaving Sheffield Interchange.

== Services ==
As of June 2024, TM Travel operates 30 services around Sheffield, Chesterfield and the surrounding areas.

=== Peak Line 218 ===
Peak Line 218 operates between Sheffield, Baslow, Bakewell, and Chatsworth. In 2018, the frequency of the service was increased from hourly to every 30 minutes. Most services are operated commercially with some council supported.

=== Spira ===
Spira was a service between Sutton-in-Ashfield and Chesterfield. It was withdrawn after 2 March 2019.

== Fleet ==
As of January 2024, the fleet consisted of 44 buses.
