= Sheffield Interchange =

Bus station in Sheffield, South Yorkshire, England

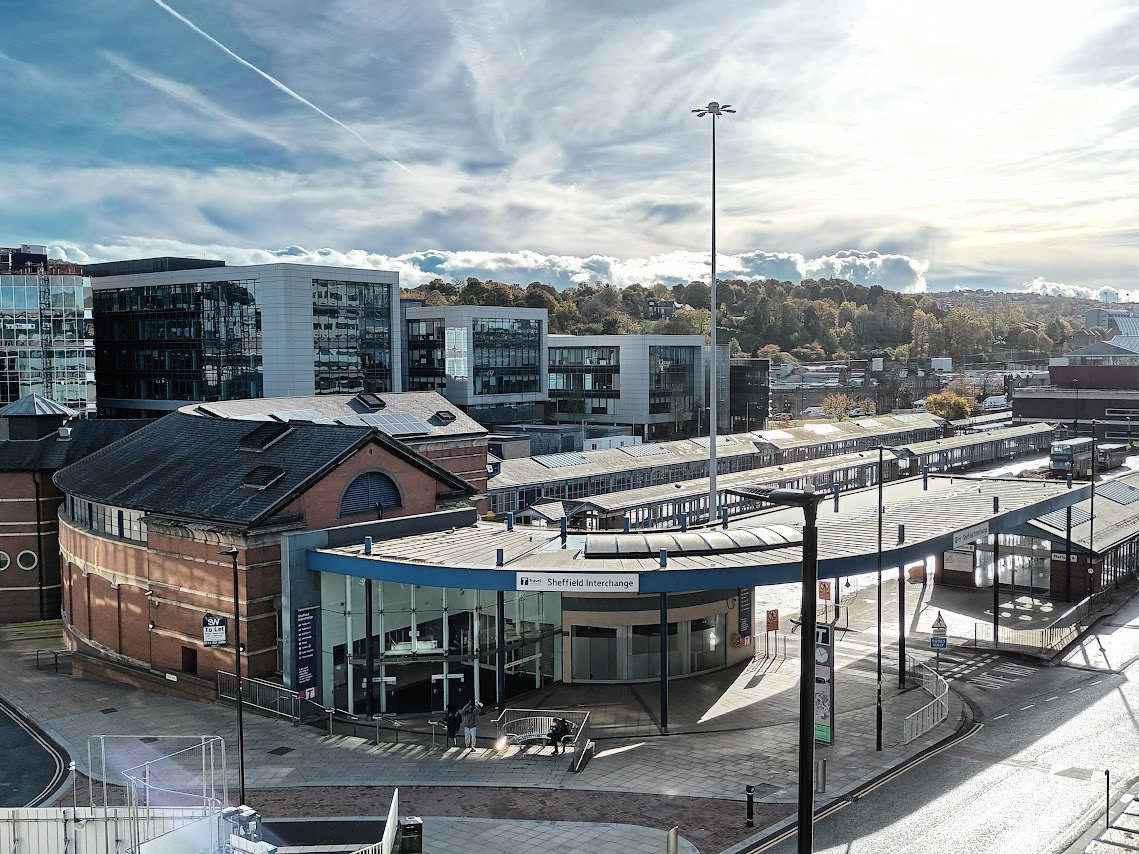

General information
- Other names: Central Bus Station, Pond Street
- Location: Pond Street, Sheffield
- Coordinates: 53.3812°N 1.4645°W
- Operator: South Yorkshire Mayoral Combined Authority
- Bus stands: 33
- Bus operators: Andrews of Tideswell, First South Yorkshire, Flixbus, High Peak Buses, National Express, South Pennine Community Transport, Stagecoach East Midlands, Stagecoach Yorkshire, TM Travel
- Connections: Sheffield station (660 ft (200 m))

Construction
- Parking: No
- Cycle facilities: Yes
- Accessible: Yes

Other information
- Website: www.travelsouthyorkshire.com/en-gb/populardestinations/sheffield-interchange

History
- Opened: 1936
Location

Sheffield Interchange is the main bus station in central Sheffield, South Yorkshire, England. The facility is served by buses operating across the Sheffield region, as well as National Express coaches that connect Sheffield with destinations across the United Kingdom.

The Interchange is located on the eastern side of Sheffield City Centre on Pond Street. The majority of bus stands at the Interchange are inside the dedicated Interchange building, although there are five additional bus stands located at the roadside on Flat Street opposite the Interchange building. At the northern end of Flat Street is Fitzalan Square tram stop, which serves all four South Yorkshire Supertram routes. A short distance away via a signposted covered walkway is Sheffield station, providing train services to locations across the country. A short walk to the west of Sheffield Interchange is Arundel Gate Interchange, the city centre's second bus station, largely serving inner city routes.

Built into the Interchange is a building known as the Archway Centre, which contains a Travel South Yorkshire Customer Service Desk, WHSmith, DJ's Cafe, Ticket Kiosks, Public Toilets and Waiting Facilities.

== History ==
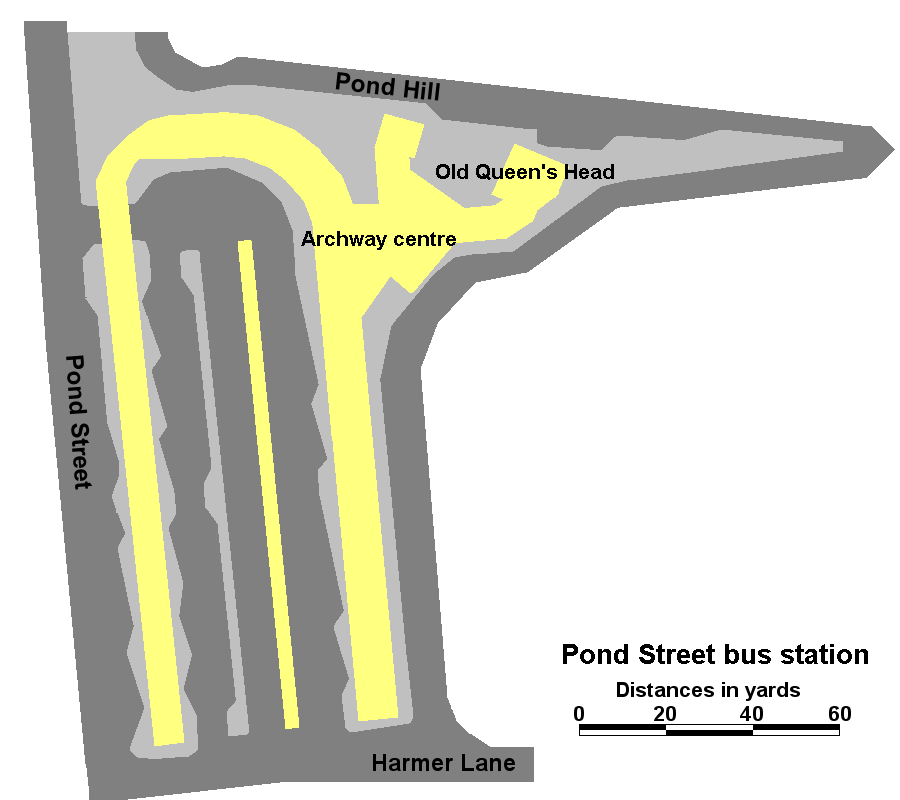
Sheffield Interchange

Sheffield Interchange was opened in 1936 as Pond Street bus station. Covered accommodation was built in 1956, replacing the collection of open-air bus stops. From 8 October 1960, the bus station ceased to share its accommodation with the Sheffield Tramway as the light rail network was closed. Work began on the reconstruction of the bus station in the early 1990s, and it was renamed Sheffield Interchange. A large section of the Interchange was demolished in the early 2000s, owing to under-use; this was subsequently redeveloped, and the area is now home to the Digital Campus.

== Present ==
As well as containing 33 bus stands, Sheffield Interchange also has an information desk, public toilets, a cash machine, and a WHSmith store within the Archway Centre, the main building. There is also a coach passenger waiting area and a cafe next to the coach stands. The Interchange is integrated with the city's railway station by way of a signposted covered walkway between the two; it is a short walk from the city centre and the nearest Supertram stop (Fitzalan Square).

== Services ==
As of 2026, the stand allocation is:

Stand	Route	Destination
A1	SC2	Sheffield City Centre Circular (South Pennine Community Transport)
A2	56	Nether Edge via London Road & Sharrow (First South Yorkshire)
A3	252	Crystal Peaks via Heeley, Gleadless Townend, Birk Hill, Eckington & Halfway (TM Travel)
A4	7	Crystal Peaks via City Road, Manor Top, Woodhouse & Beighton (Stagecoach Yorkshire)
A4	8	Birley via City Road, Manor Top & Base Green (First South Yorkshire)
A4	8A	Dyke Vale Road via City Road, Manor Top, Base Green & Birley Moor Road (First South Yorkshire)
A5	120	Halfway via Park Hill, City Road, Manor Top, Frecheville, Crystal Peaks & Westfield (First South Yorkshire & Stagecoach Yorkshire)
A5	120K	Killamarsh via Park Hill, City Road, Manor Top, Frecheville, Crystal Peaks, Sothall & Norwood (First South Yorkshire)
B1	SC1	Sheffield City Centre Circular (South Pennine Community Transport)
B2	18	Hillsborough via Bramall Lane, Heeley, Woodseats, Norton Lees, Gleadless Townend, Manor Top, Darnall, Meadowhall, Grimesthorpe, Page Hall, Firth Park, Shiregreen & Shirecliffe (First South Yorkshire)
B2	18A	Hillsborough via Bramall Lane, Heeley, Woodseats, Norton Lees, Gleadless Townend, Manor Top, Darnall, Meadowhall, Grimesthorpe, Page Hall, Firth Park, Shiregreen, Sheffield Lane Top, Longley Hall Road & Shirecliffe (First South Yorkshire)
B2	181	Dore via Hallamshire Hospital, Hunters Bar, Ecclesall Road South & Ringinglow Road (South Pennine Community Transport)
B3	29	Holmfirth via Fir Vale, Northern General Hospital, Ecclesfield, Chapeltown, High Green, Howbrook, Wortley, Thurgoland & Penistone (South Pennine Community Transport)
B3	56	Manor Park via Park Hill & Wybourn (First South Yorkshire)
B4	10	Manor Top via Skye Edge & Manor Park (Stagecoach Yorkshire)
B5	10A	Manor Top via Upperthorpe, Broomhill, Nether Edge, Heeley & Newfield Green (Stagecoach Yorkshire)
B6	9	Littledale Estate via Attercliffe & Darnall (TM Travel)
B6	9A	Manor Top via Attercliffe, Darnall, Manor & City Road (First South Yorkshirel)
B6	31	Parson Cross via Upperthorpe, Hillsborough, Wadsley Bridge & Fox Hill (TM Travel)
B6	32	Meadowhall via Burngreave, Shirecliffe, Wadsley Bridge, Parson Cross, Northern General Hospital, Firth Park, Shiregreen & Wincobank (TM Travel)
C1	X3	Doncaster via Attercliffe, Meadowhall, Rotherham, Thrybergh, Conisbrough & Balby (First South Yorkshire)
C2	65	Buxton via Ecclesall, Fox House, Grindleford, Calver, Baslow, Stoney Middleton, Eyam & Tideswell ( Stagecoach Yorkshire)
C2	X17	Barnsley via Carbrook, Meadowhall, M1, Birdwell & Worsbrough (Stagecoach Yorkshire)
C3	137	Rotherham via Burngreave, Grimesthorpe, Meadowhall, Wincobank, Blackburn, Kimberworth & Masbrough (Stagecoach Yorkshire)
C4	73	Rotherham via Bramall Lane, Heeley, Arbourthorne, Manor Top, Richmond, Handsworth, Waverley, Catcliffe, Treeton, Brinsworth & Canklow (First South Yorkshire)
C4	207	Rotherham via Attercliffe, Carbrook, Tinsley & Brinsworth (TM Travel)
C4	X7	Maltby via Whiston, Wickersley & Bramley (TM Travel)
C5	70	Meadowhall via Eastern Avenue, Manor Top, Handsworth, Waverley & Tinsley Park (TM Travel)
C5	70A	Meadowhall via Eastern Avenue, Manor Top, Dyke Vale Road, Woodhouse, Handsworth, Waverley & Tinsley Park (First South Yorkshire)
C5	71	Harthill via Darnall, Tinsley, Catcliffe, Swallownest & Todwick (TM Travel)
C5	71A	Harthill via Parkway Markets, Darnall, Tinsley, Catcliffe, Swallownest & Todwick (TM Travel)
C5	X11	Doncaster via Waverley, Moorgate, Wickersley, Bramley, Maltby, Tickhill, Hesley, Rossington & Balby (First South Yorkshire)
C6	216	Laughton Common via Granville Road, Manor Top, Richmond, Handsworth, Swallownest, Kiveton Park, South Anston, North Anston & Dinnington (First South Yorkshire)
C6	X5	Dinnington via Handsworth, Swallownest, Wales, Kiveton Park, South Anston & North Anston (First South Yorkshire)
D1	–	stand no longer exists
D2	65	Meadowhall via Carbrook (Stagecoach Yorkshire)
D2	271	Castleton via Hallamshire Hospital, Hunters Bar, Ecclesall Road, Fox House, Hathersage, Bamford & Hope (High Peak Buses)
D2	272	Castleton via Hunters Bar, Ecclesall Road, Fox House, Hathersage, Bamford & Hope (First South Yorkshire & High Peak Buses)
D3	218	Bakewell via Ecclesall, Totley, Calver, Baslow & Chatsworth House (TM Travel)
D3	257	Bakewell via Broomhill, Crosspool, Ashopton, Yorkshire Bridge, Bamford, Hathersage, Grindleford, Calver Slough, Stoney Middleton, Eyam, Stoney Middleton, Calver Bridge & Baslow (Andrews of Tideswell)
D3	257A	Bakewell via Broomhill, Crosspool, Ashopton, Yorkshire Bridge, Bamford, Hathersage, Grindleford, Calver Slough, Stoney Middleton, Eyam, Wardlow & Ashford-in-the-Water (Andrews of Tideswell)
D3	257B	Bakewell via Broomhill, Crosspool, Ashopton, Yorkshire Bridge, Bamford, Hope, Bradwell, Great Hucklow, Foolow, Eyam, Stoney Middleton, Calver Bridge & Baslow (Andrews of Tideswell)
D4	X17	Wirksworth via Heeley, Woodseats, Whittington Moor, Chesterfield, Walton, Kelstedge & Matlock (Stagecoach Yorkshire)
D5	50	Chesterfield via Granville Road, Manor Top, Mosborough, Eckington, Birk Hill Estate, New Whittington, Old Whittington, New Whittington, Whittington Moor & Stonegravels (Stagecoach Yorkshire)
D5	50A	Chesterfield via Granville Road, Manor Top, Mosborough, Eckington, Marsh Lane, New Whittington, Old Whittington, New Whittington, Whittington Moor & Stonegravels (Stagecoach Yorkshire)
D5	53	Mansfield via Granville Road, Manor Top, Mosborough, Eckington, Barlborough, Clowne, Stanfree, Shuttlewood, Bolsover, Palterton, Scarcliffe, New Houghton & Pleasley (Stagecoach East Midlands)
D6	M76	Chancet Wood via Nether Edge, Abbeydale Road, Woodseats & Greenhill (TM Travel)
E1	–	No Services Allocated
E2	-	National Express Intercity Coach Services
E3	–	No Services Allocated
E4	–	Flixbus Intercity Coach Services
E5	–	No Services Allocated
E6	–	No Services Allocated

=== Coach services ===
Sheffield Interchange also has several dedicated coach stands (E1 to E6) which are used by services beginning and terminating at the interchange, as well as several others which are passing through. Stand E1 is the primary pick up/drop off point and this is where the National Express office is located. Sheffield Interchange is also served by a limited number of Stagecoach Express coach routes, as well as other lesser known coach operators. National Express, the primary user, uses the interchange for the following routes:

Route	Start	End	Via	Operator
132	Bradford	Nottingham	Leeds, Meadowhall, Sheffield	Skills Coaches
465	Huddersfield	London	Halifax, Bradford, Leeds, Wakefield, Barnsley, Meadowhall, Sheffield, Chesterfield, Mansfield, Nottingham, Leicester, Watford Gap, Golders Green, Marble Arch	Stagecoach Yorkshire
560	Barnsley or Doncaster	London	Rotherham, Meadowhall, Sheffield, Meadowhead, Chesterfield, Milton Keynes, Golders Green, Marble Arch	Stagecoach Yorkshire and Clarkes of London
564	Halifax	London	Huddersfield, Mirfield, Dewsbury, Wakefield, Meadowhall, Sheffield, Meadowhead, Chesterfield, Milton Keynes, Golders Green, Marble Arch	Stagecoach Yorkshire
907	Birmingham	Bradford	Sheffield, Meadowhall, Leeds	Stotts Coaches

== Bibliography ==
- Sheffield, Emerging City, 1969, Sheffield City Council. ISBN 0-901656-01-1
- Great Cities: Sheffield, 2005, Melwyn Jones. ISBN 1-904736-73-4
