= Mosborough (ward) =

Electoral ward in the City of Sheffield, South Yorkshire, England

Coordinates: 53.325°N 1.362°W

- Shown within Sheffield
- Population: 17,097 (ward. 2011)
- Metropolitan borough: City of Sheffield
- Metropolitan county: South Yorkshire
- Region: Yorkshire and the Humber
- Country: England
- Sovereign state: United Kingdom
- UK Parliament: Sheffield South East
- Councillors: David Barker (Labour Party); Gail Smith(Liberal Democrats); Tony Downing (Labour Party)

Mosborough is an electoral ward of the City of Sheffield, England, in the eastern part of the city, on the border with North East Derbyshire District. The population in 2011 was 17,097. It is one of the wards that make up the Sheffield South East constituency.

== Districts of Mosborough ward ==
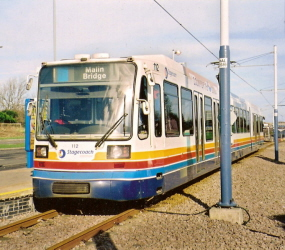
Supertram at Halfway

=== Halfway ===
Halfway (grid reference SK432809) lies in the extreme southeast of Sheffield at the end of a South Yorkshire Supertram line, served by Halfway tram stop. Halfway was part of the historic county of Derbyshire but has been administered by Sheffield since boundary changes in 1967.

It used to be home to a bus garage which was operated by Booth and Fisher, a company who were merged into the South Yorkshire Passenger Transport Executive in the mid-1970s. The garage itself passed into the hands of operator SYT, then to the First and has always been seen as a minor outpost garage. It served works and school services and buses starting early from the south side of the city. The garage was closed in 2007, as a cost-cutting measure. Recently it was taken over by the Chesterfield based company TM Travel.

It is common to see public transport in Sheffield heading for Halfway. The Blue route of the South Yorkshire Supertram terminates at Halfway with a large Park and Ride facility. The main service to and from Halfway to and from the city centre is the 120 service, jointly operated by both Stagecoach Sheffield and First South Yorkshire.

The Halfway housing estate is something of a unique experiment. Built in 1975, the estate centred in the small local shopping centre called Streetfields. The houses themselves were built on high quality farmland and to this day there are farms with orchards nearby.

The Sheffield City Council burns a lot of domestic refuse the energy from which in turn is converted to hot water used for both domestic supply and central heating. This is pumped from Bernard Road in S2 to Halfway and links directly with the homes in the Halfway locality. Well-insulated and often compact, these homes are noticeably energy-efficient.

The layout of the estate was such that no house would look directly onto another, with properties curving around meandering walkways and a complex network of through routes to Halfway Drive. This main road is the thoroughfare linking the village to both the Derbyshire county boundary and neighbouring estates of Westfield and Waterthorpe.

Despite being a well-planned and high-quality overall project, the estate today suffers in part from crime and has been called, on the Sheffield City Council website, as an area to work actively towards safer communities.

=== Holbrook ===
Holbrook was a mining village whose name was changed to Halfway (after the Halfway House pub) to avoid confusion with Holbrook near Derby.

grid reference SK442818

The name is still used in several road names and commercial and light industrial trading estates, including.

==== Holbrook Commerce Park ====
The following companies are established in Holbrook Commerce Park

- Holbrook Telecom Limited
- High Availability Hosting Limited

==== Holbrook Industrial Estate ====
Evolution Power Tools Ltd.

=== Mosborough ===
Mosborough (grid reference SK426813) was part of the historic county of Derbyshire but has been administered by Sheffield since boundary changes in 1967 and is now considered a suburb of Sheffield. It was known for sickle making and was also a coal mining area. Notable buildings include the fifteenth century Mosborough Hall, a building which may retain some Anglo-Saxon structure, and St Mark's Church. Town had a population of 4,063 in 2011.

The suburb has many high quality houses, local independent shops and hotel conference facilities.

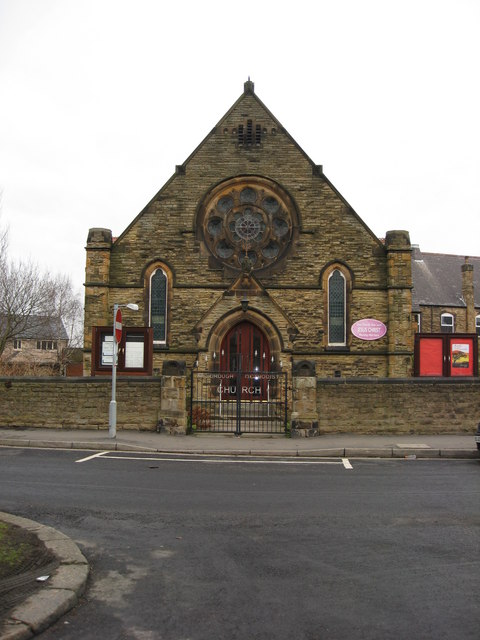
Mosborough Methodist Church

Mosborough a small village in the 1930s and 1940s Had many more drinking places than the seven listed below. They were:

- The Fitzwilliam Mosborough Moor
- The British Oak Mosborough Moor
- The Queens Hotel High Street
- The Crown High Street
- The Brown Cow High Street
- The Black Bull Station Road
- The Vine Tavern School Street
- The Butchers Arms High Street
- The Royal Oak High Street
- The George And Dragon High Street
- The Blue Bell Duke Street
- Duke William Duke Street
- The Prince of Wales South Street
- The Alma South Street
- The Coronation Club Chapel Street
- The Sidney Queen Street
- The Three Tuns no Street given

In the Kellys Directory there were several other places with licences to sell ale. These were not designated as public houses.

The working men's club is the CIU affiliated Miners Welfare.

On August Bank Holiday, the locals do a pub crawl known as the Mosborough 10 for charity often in fancy dress. It has been known for people to come from as far away as Blackpool to take part in this event.

=== Waterthorpe ===
Housing Estate near Beighton named after Waterthorpe (formerly Walterthorpe) Farm grid reference SK430827

The Waterthorpe and Westfield housing estates were built from mid-1970s and were added to over a number of years. Eventually linking with both the old council estate of Beighton and the new estate of Halfway, the estates house a condensed significant number of almost wholly local authority owned properties following the phasing down and demolition of the original estates around Parson Cross and Shiregreen in the north of the city.

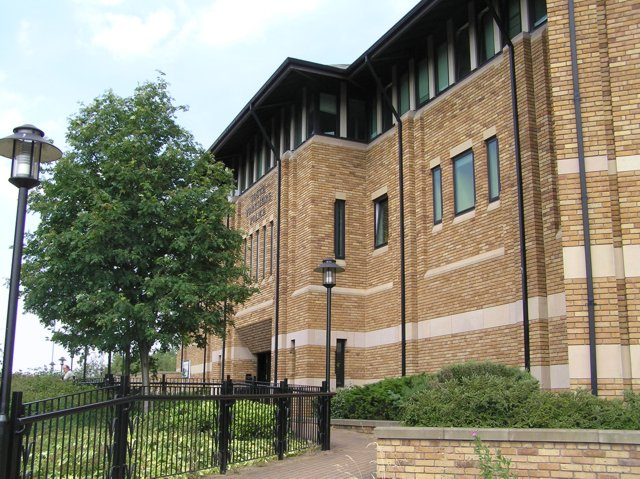
Moss Way Police Station

The Crystal Peaks shopping centre was opened in 1988 to serve the south side of the city. Its original design included markets and fixed national chains including a UCI Cinema. Crystal Peaks originally had a ski theme, When one was in the central atrium there was a cable car and skiing mannequins suspended from the glass roof. The centre has always had a petrol station formerly run by BP, and up until recently was open 24-hours. Crystal Peaks was one of the most popular Shopping Centres in the country, but over time popularity and investment was falling due to the opening of Meadowhall Centre in the north of the city in September 1990. In 1998 Crystal Peaks underwent an extension called "Crystal Peaks 2" covering the west Atrium from the market downwards, where the original Playground was right down to the bus station. The Playground was moved to the east atrium near the petrol station. Later on between 2005 and 2008 the centre underwent even more developments. The Sainsbury's which was originally on the north side of the centre, was moved into much larger, newly built premises which includes a car park on the roof, in the southern wing of the centre on the former site of the cinema.

As for Waterthorpe and Westfield estates, leisure facilities are lacking as the council concentrated upon housing and not the substantial areas of parkland in most other areas of Sheffield.

==== Crystal Peaks bus station ====
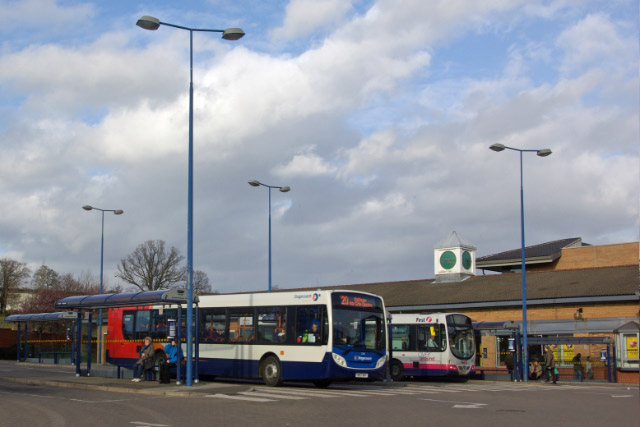
Crystal Peaks bus station in March 2008

Crystal Peaks bus station serves the Crystal Peaks shopping complex, Waterthorpe.

The bus station is situated at Peak Square, Crystal Peaks centre and is about 55 yards (50 m) away from the Sheffield Supertram stop.

There are eight stands at the bus station and the main operators include First South Yorkshire, Stagecoach Sheffield, Stagecoach East Midlands and TM Travel.

Buses go from the bus station towards Sheffield, Rotherham, Eckington and Worksop.

=== Westfield ===
Westfield is one of the Mosborough "Townships", smallish self-contained communities that have yet to develop into communities. It is on the fringes of Sheffield, overlooks Derbyshire and is surrounded to the north by quite densely populated housing and to the south by open countryside. It has a small but well-equipped shopping centre.

The housing is mixed with private estates interwoven with public sector housing which was originally aimed at the more vulnerable and/or elderly tenants. In about 2006, the local primary school "Shortbrook School", the community centre and the doctor's surgery were burnt out. The surgery was, for a while moved to Owlthorpe then housed in a small green portakabin not far from the original site. Recently the central surgery has been reopened and the portakabin still stands there, unused. Shortbrook Primary has reopened and will have largely new staff from September 2008. Westfield Secondary School was relocated from its former position in Mosborough village and opened its doors on the border of Westfield in 2007. There are still problems with the community facilities.

Recently the former "Golden Keys" public house has been turned into a local community centre or youth "club" in Westfield centre.

The council has now agreed to invest in the recovery of Westfield. They are investing about £50,000. The local Co-op are also investing, as are the Primary Care Trust.

=== Plumbley ===
Plumbley is a hamlet in the west of the ward, and is mainly rural, bar a scattering of residences and farms. Its surrounding environs are within the South and West Yorkshire Green Belt.
