= Hillsborough Interchange =

Bus and tram interchange in Sheffield, England

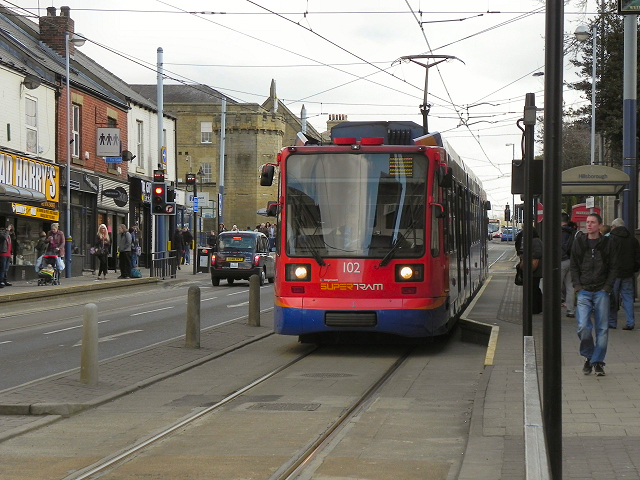

General information
- Location: 540 Langsett Road, Hillsborough; Sheffield (S6 2LX); England
- Coordinates: 53.4017°N 1.4989°W
- Grid reference: SK333896
- Owner: South Yorkshire Passenger Transport Executive
- Operator: South Yorkshire Passenger Transport Executive
- Platforms: 2 ( Supertram) B Y
- Bus stands: 8
- Bus operators: First South Yorkshire, South Yorkshire Supertram, Stagecoach Yorkshire, South Pennine Community Transport

Construction
- Parking: Yes (free, in Hillsborough Barracks)
- Cycle facilities: Yes
- Accessible: Yes
Location

Hillsborough Interchange is a bus and tram interchange in Hillsborough, Sheffield. It serves a variety of operators including First South Yorkshire, South Yorkshire Supertram and Stagecoach Yorkshire, South Pennine Community Transport. It is staffed between 07:00 and 19:00 Monday to Saturday and has six bus stands and two tram platforms.

== History ==
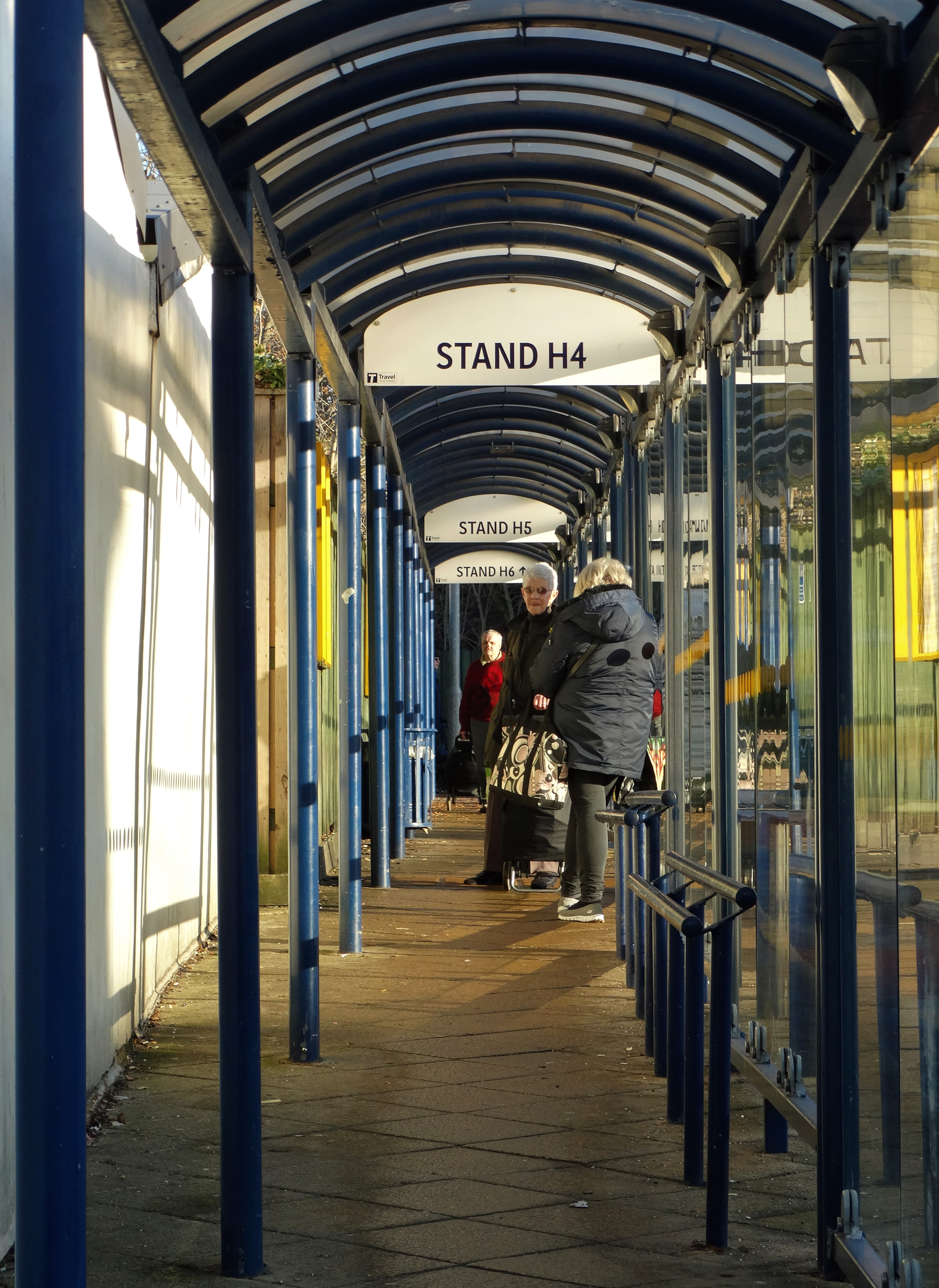
Bus stands

The area currently occupied by the bus station was formerly a Total Garage. Services that formerly terminated at Malin Bridge and Forbes Road were diverted into the Interchange, and services that formerly stopped further up the road by Hillsborough Barracks near the old Officer Mess building (now the headquarters for Sheffield Insulations Ltd) were also re-routed to stop at the Interchange.

== Layout ==
Hillsborough Interchange is located near the Hillsborough Barracks.

The tram stop is located to the north of the interchange, and comprises two platforms. The platform which serves trams heading towards Malin Bridge and Middlewood is located in front of The Rawson Spring public house, with the platform serving trams towards Halfway and Meadowhall Interchange being located opposite.

The bus station is located adjacent to the travel centre. Stand H1 is adjacent to, but set back from, Langsett Road, with stands H2 and H3 line with this. Stands H4 and H5 have the same continuous shelter and run at 45 degrees from the travel centre to the cycle parking at rear of the bus station. Stand H6 is located opposite stands H4 and H5. A further two bus stops are located next to the Interchange directly on Langsett Road.

== Services ==
Preceding station	South Yorkshire Supertram	Following station
Bamforth Street towards Meadowhall Interchange	Yellow Route	Hillsborough Park towards Middlewood
Bamforth Street towards Halfway	Blue Route	Malin Bridge; Terminus
