= Bus Rapid Transit North =

South Yorkshire, England transport infrastructure

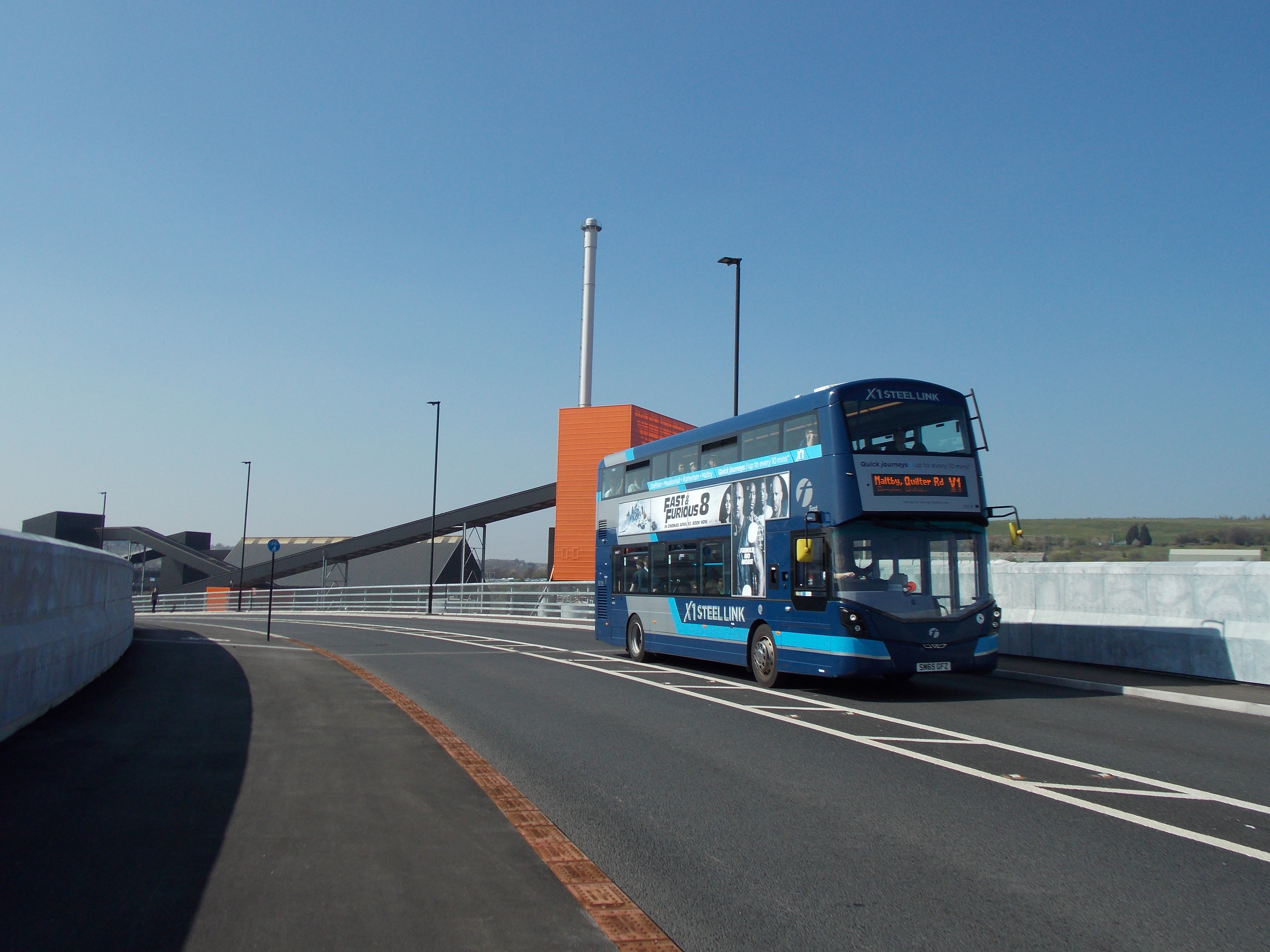
- An X1 bus on Blackburn Meadows Way shortly after opening
- Founded: 4 September 2016
- Locale: South Yorkshire
- Service type: Bus rapid transit
- Routes: 3 (December 2024)
- Destinations: Sheffield; Rotherham
- Fleet: 22 Wright StreetDecks
- Operator: First South Yorkshire
- Website: www.sypte.co.uk

Bus Rapid Transit North is a bus rapid transit scheme introduced by the South Yorkshire Passenger Transport Executive in England. It consists of one route operated by First South Yorkshire between Sheffield and Rotherham.

== History ==
In November 2013, the Government of the United Kingdom approved the construction of a bus rapid transit scheme between Sheffield and Rotherham via Meadowhall in South Yorkshire which included the construction of the 800 metre Blackburn Meadows Way link with that crosses the River Don and Sheffield Supertram and goes under the Tinsley Viaduct.

Construction commenced in January 2014. Delays and cost overruns were encountered after asbestos and World War II munitions were encountered during construction.

The Scheme was Project Managed for Carillion by Martin Black and involved the construction of an 11m high mechanically stabilized earth (MSE) wall designed in conjunction with Tensar

It opened on 4 September 2016 with First South Yorkshire introducing route X1 under the Steel Link brand between Sheffield and Maltby.

== Vehicles ==
To operate the service, 22 Wright StreetDecks were delivered to First South Yorkshire in a dark blue and grey livery. Because of a delay in the completion of the project, they initially entered service in January 2016 on route X78 from Sheffield to Doncaster.
