= Travel South Yorkshire =

English public transport executive

- Predecessor: South Yorkshire Passenger Transport Executive
- Successor: South Yorkshire People's Network
- Formation: 2006; 20 years ago
- Dissolved: End of 2026 (planned)
- Type: Integrated Transport Authority
- Region served: South Yorkshire
- Owner: South Yorkshire Mayoral Combined Authority (since 2023)
- Website: https://www.travelsouthyorkshire.com

Travel South Yorkshire is the public transport passenger information brand used by South Yorkshire Mayoral Combined Authority. It was originally the public facing brand of the South Yorkshire Passenger Transport Executive before it was dissolved and merged into SYMCA in April 2023. In March 2026, it was announced that the Travel South Yorkshire brand would be wound down and replaced by the South Yorkshire People's Network by the end of the year.

== Infrastructure ==
Travel South Yorkshire is responsible for all the bus stops, shelters and bus interchanges in the county, along with park & ride sites. It also is responsible for the Sheffield Supertram network infrastructure.

Travel South Yorkshire's interchanges at Sheffield, Arundel Gate in Sheffield, Rotherham, Barnsley, Doncaster, Hillsborough and Dinnington provide information and advice about public transport in South Yorkshire. From these interchanges, information can be obtained and a range of multi-modal (TravelMaster) tickets can be bought from self-serve vending machines. Other travel passes which were previously available at 'Information Centre' desks at these interchanges are now only available from the Travel South Yorkshire website or over the phone from Traveline.

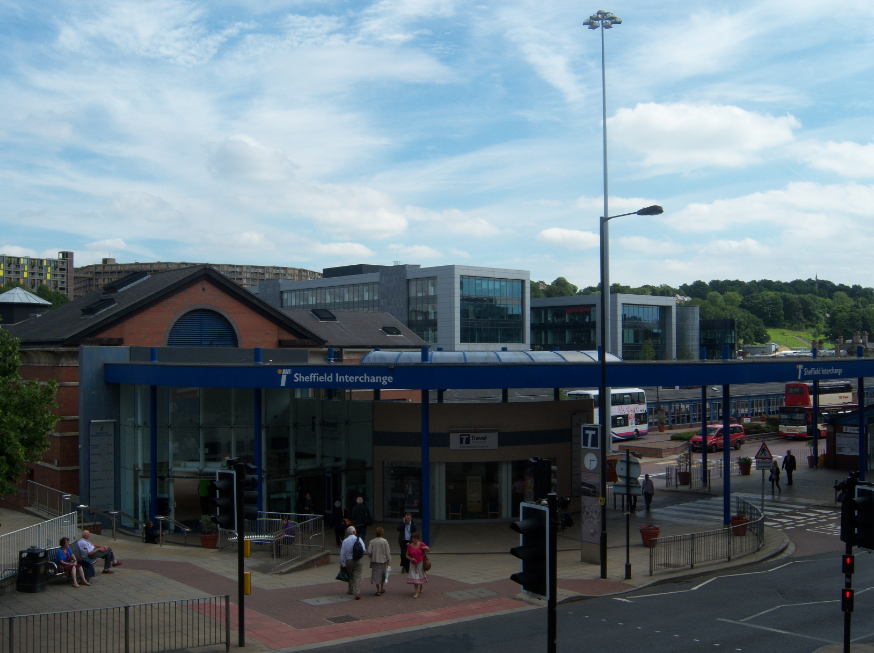
Sheffield Interchange

=== Timetable information ===
Travel South Yorkshire provides timetable information for all bus and train services within South Yorkshire. This can be found at stops, in the form of timetable leaflets, information on the web and a telephone enquiry service called Traveline.

== Ticketing and concessions ==
Travel South Yorkshire sells a range of multi-modal tickets on behalf of the public transport operators of South Yorkshire, including countywide Travelmaster tickets. These are generally in the form of smart card tickets and are commercial products which do not receive a subsidy. It also administers the concessionary travel schemes for young people and students, senior citizens and the mobility impaired. The Mayor of South Yorkshire, Oliver Coppard, pledged to establish bus franchising, on the basis that an independent audit had recommended it – during the 2021 election campaign, he had made transport a 'priority' – the proposed franchising would be complete in 2028 and start in 2024.

== Transport services ==
It is responsible for various public transport services in the county, including various subsidised bus services.
