= Stagecoach Yorkshire =

Bus operator in South Yorkshire and Derbyshire, England

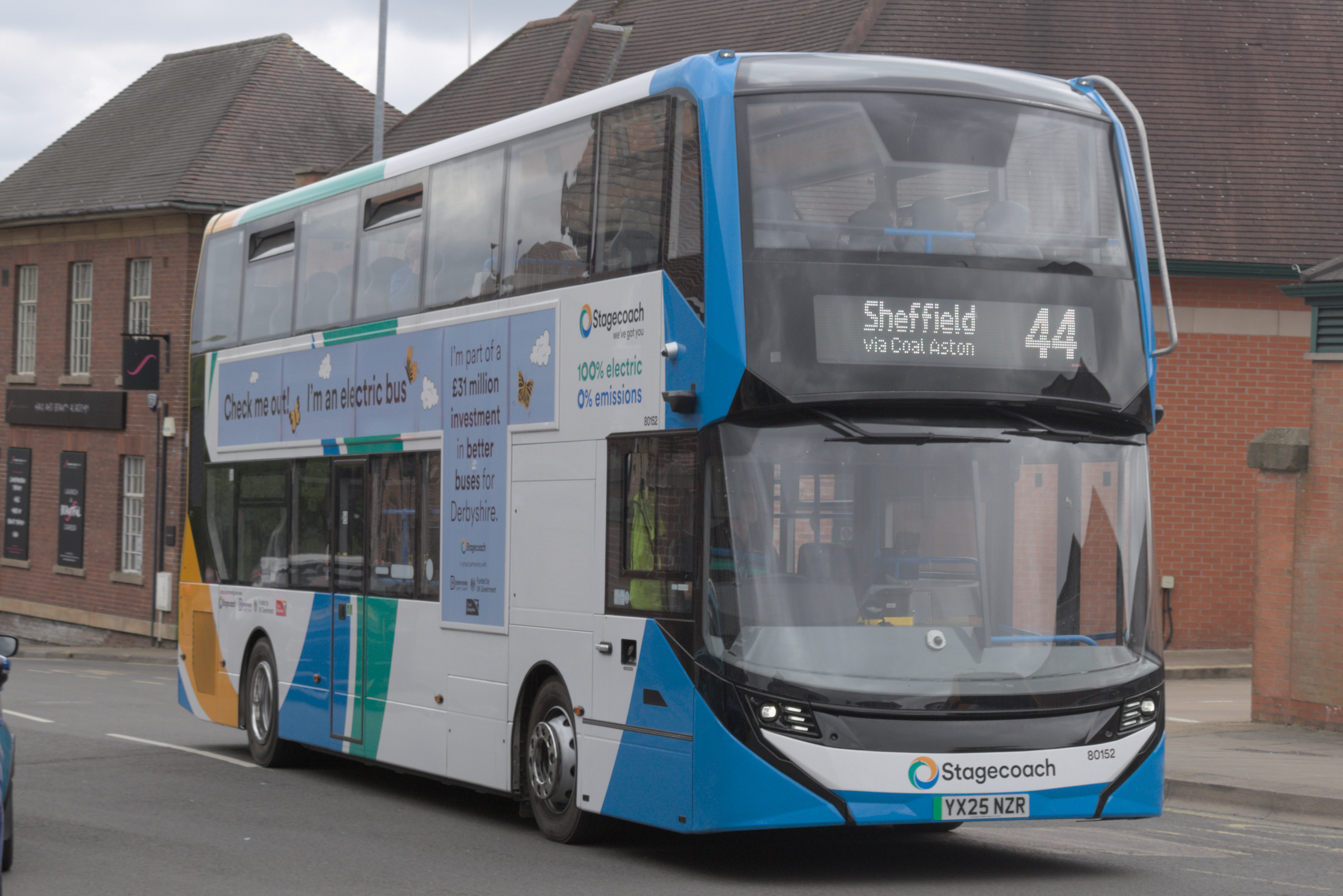
- Alexander Dennis Enviro400EV battery electric bus in Chesterfield in May 2025
- Parent: Stagecoach Group
- Founded: 14 December 2005; 20 years ago
- Headquarters: Barnsley, South Yorkshire
- Service area: South Yorkshire; Derbyshire; Nottinghamshire
- Service type: Bus
- Hubs: Barnsley Interchange; Chesterfield coach station Frenchgate Interchange; Meadowhall Interchange; Rotherham Interchange; Sheffield Interchange
- Depots: 5
- Fleet: 351 (December 2024)
- Operator: Stagecoach Group
- Website: Official Website

The Yorkshire Traction Co Ltd trading as Stagecoach Yorkshire is a bus operator providing local and regional services across South Yorkshire and Derbyshire in England. It is a subsidiary of the Stagecoach Group and is headquartered in Barnsley.

The subsidiary was formed in 2005 following the takeover of the Traction Group to run the operations of Yorkshire Traction, Yorkshire Terrier and Barnsley & District in South Yorkshire. Since then, the geographical coverage of the Stagecoach Yorkshire division has changed, with the divestment of services in the Huddersfield area and the transfer of Derbyshire operations from Stagecoach East Midlands.

== History ==
=== Yorkshire Traction ===
Yorkshire Traction Leyland Olympian outside Rawmarsh depot in June 2005

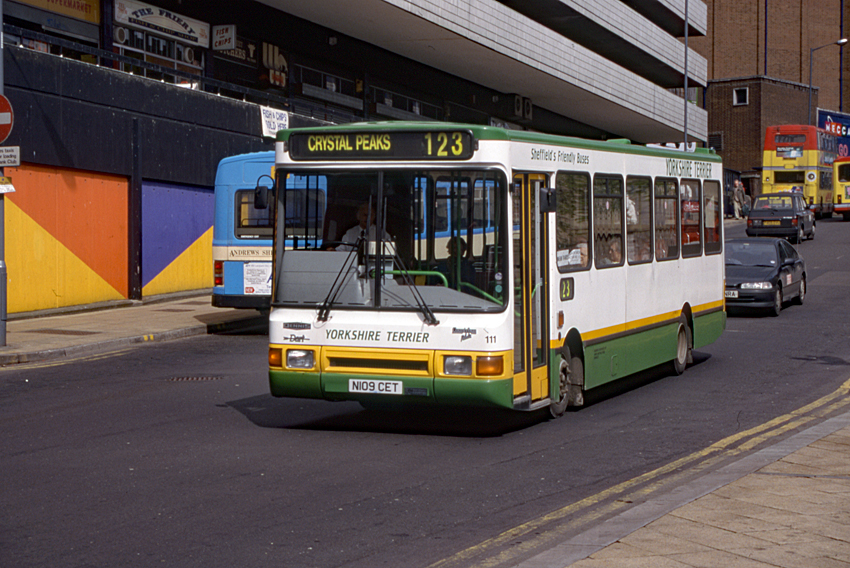
Yorkshire Terrier Northern Counties Paladin bodied Dennis Dart in April 1998

The Traction Group was a large independent bus operator that had grown out of bus deregulation and the break-up of the National Bus Company in the UK. The company was formed in 1987 when the Barnsley-based Yorkshire Traction subsidiary was sold to its management and employees, led by Frank Carter. Within South Yorkshire, operations consisted of the main Yorkshire Traction operation and subsidiary companies Yorkshire Terrier and Barnsley & District.

Yorkshire Terrier was an independent post-deregulation bus company operating in Sheffield that had been formed in 1988 following the closure of a South Yorkshire Transport depot, and had also expanded itself with acquisition of some smaller operators within Sheffield; in 2000, Yorkshire Traction purchased Yorkshire Terrier along with the operations of Andrews, South Riding, Sheffield Omnibus, and Kingsman. These operators were all based in Sheffield, mainly competing with former municipal Mainline Buses on service in and around the city.

Barnsley & District was formed in July 1990 when Traction bought Tom Jowitt Travel of Tankersley. It was enlarged in 1992 when Pride of The Road, Royston was purchased, and in 1995, when the bus operations of Globe of Barnsley were taken over.

=== Stagecoach ownership ===
In December 2005, the Stagecoach Group acquired the Traction Group, and with it, the operations of Yorkshire Traction, which subsequently was rebranded to Stagecoach Yorkshire. Following the takeover by Stagecoach, Barnsley & District was closed and absorbed into Yorkshire Traction in July 2006, and three months later, the Stagecoach in Chesterfield operation was transferred into Stagecoach Yorkshire from Stagecoach East Midlands. The Chesterfield operation had been founded in 1987 as part of East Midland Motor Services and, at the time of the takeover by Stagecoach Yorkshire, employed 320 people and carried around eight million passengers every year, an increase of 10% over the previous year.

In May 2008, following rumours that Arriva were to purchase Stagecoach's Huddersfield operations, it was announced that Centrebus Holdings, a joint venture between Centrebus and Arriva, who held a 40% stake in Centrebus, would instead buy the division, forming the Huddersfield Bus Company. Arriva sold their stake in Centrebus and rebrand their wholly owned Huddersfield operations to Yorkshire Tiger in September 2013.

== Operations ==
=== electro ===
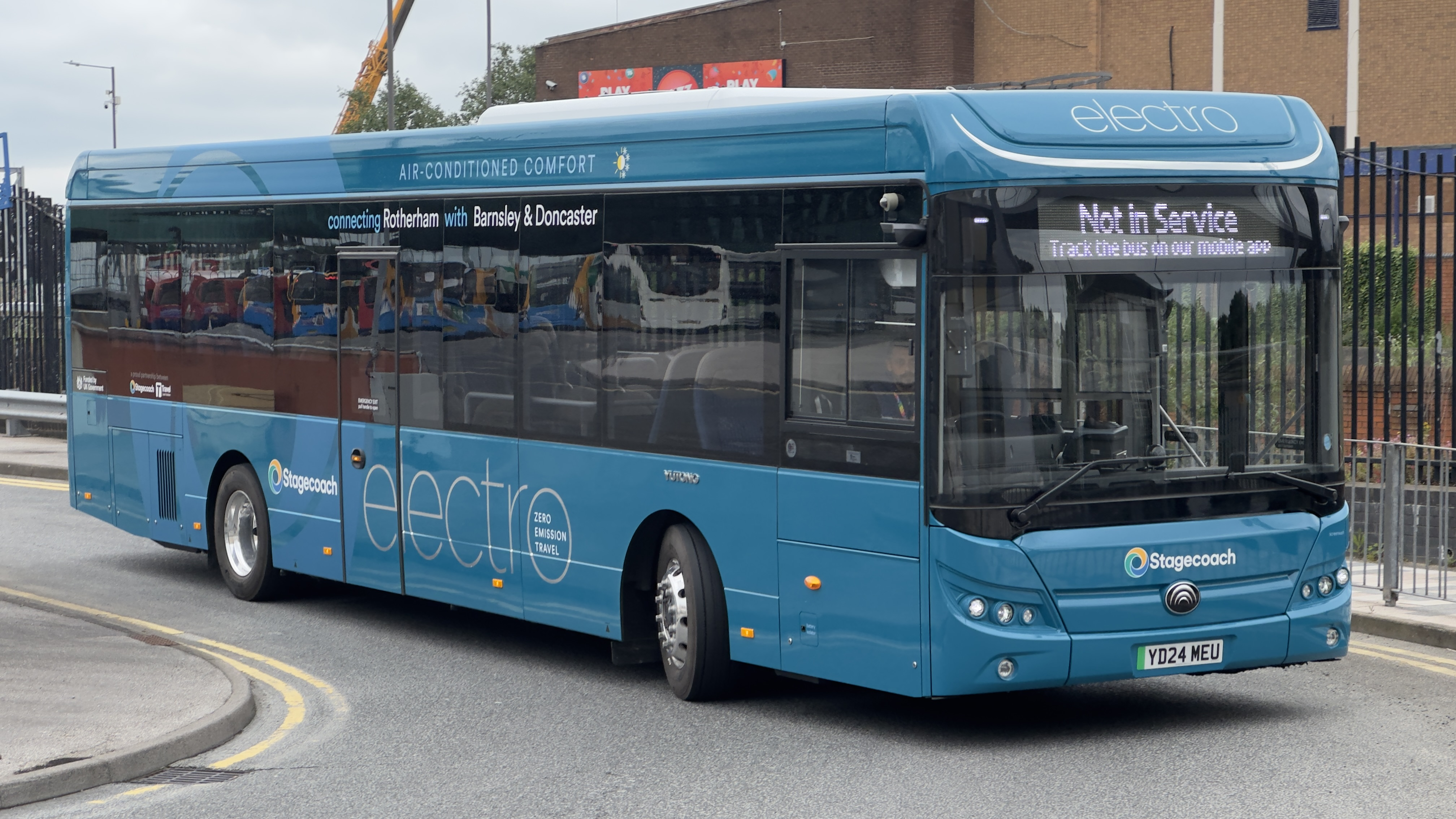
'electro' branded Yutong E12 in Barnsley in May 2024

Battery electric buses were first introduced to Stagecoach Yorkshire in May 2024 with the introduction of 23 Yutong E12s, funded by the Zero-Emission Bus Regional Areas (ZEBRA) in partnership with the South Yorkshire Mayoral Combined Authority, for use on Rawmarsh services 22x and 221, serving Rotherham, Barnsley and Doncaster. The E12s, equipped with pantograph chargers, were branded as 'electro' buses, painted in a dark blue version of standard Stagecoach livery.

=== Gold ===
Stagecoach Yorkshire's first Stagecoach Gold service commenced on 10 November 2014, with the upgrading of the X17 service, running between Sheffield, Chesterfield and Matlock to operate a fleet of Scania N230UD Alexander Dennis Enviro400s with high-specification interiors. After the route was extended from Sheffield to Meadowhall and Barnsley in 2018, eight Alexander Dennis Enviro400 MMC buses with high-specification interiors replaced the Enviro400s shortly thereafter. In 2025, the Gold status of the X17 route was removed following the allocation of Alexander Dennis Enviro400EV battery electric buses onto the service in a standard fleet livery.

=== SupertramLink ===
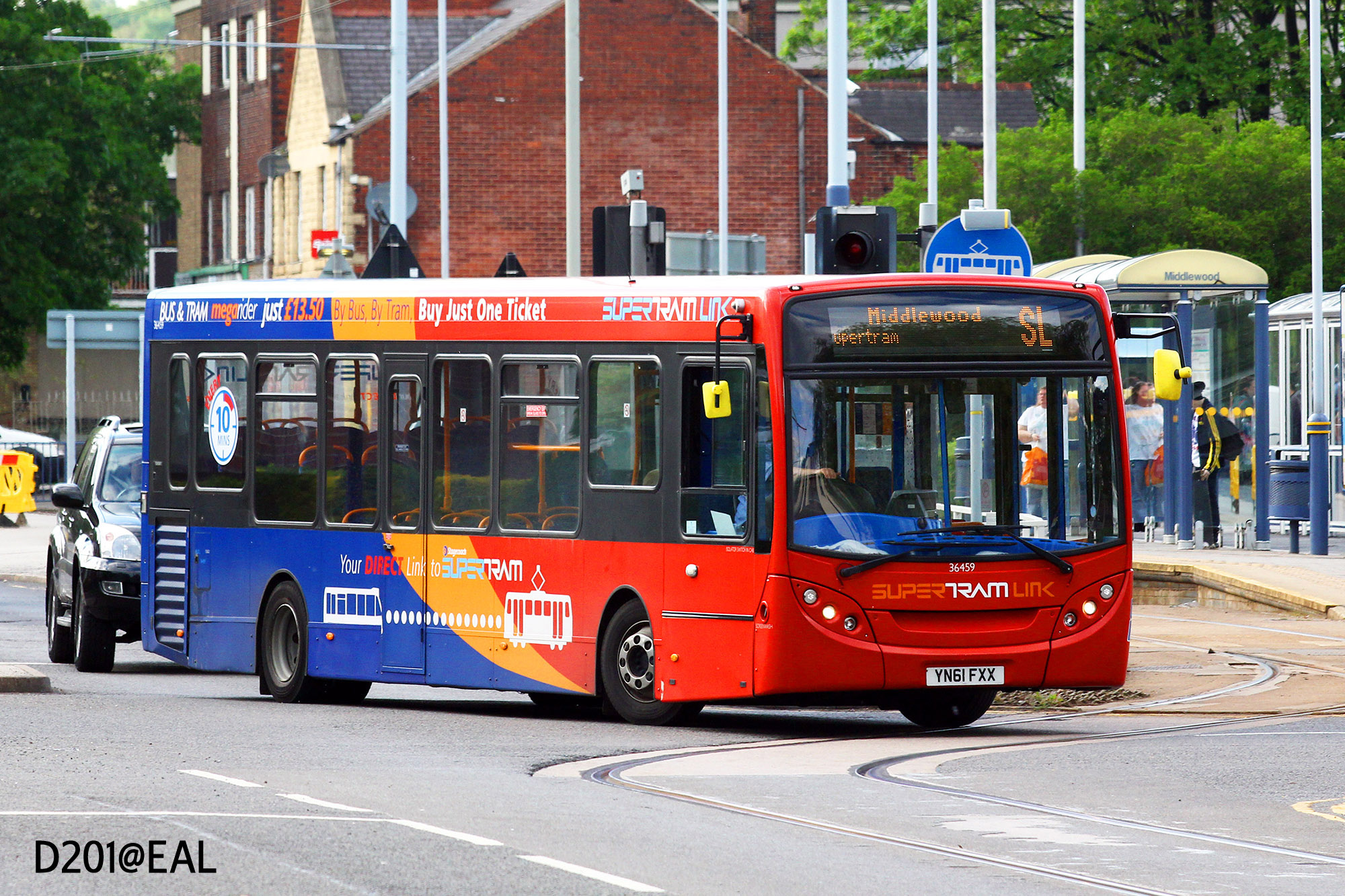
SupertramLink-branded Alexander Dennis Enviro200 at the Middlewood Supertram stop in May 2015

Stagecoach Yorkshire operated a SupertramLink bus in Sheffield that extended the Sheffield Supertram yellow route. SupertramLink 1 (SL1/SL1A) ran from the Middlewood park and ride site at the northern Yellow route terminus, to Stocksbridge approximately 5 miles away, via Oughtibridge and the A6102. The service linked with the Yellow tram terminus at Middlewood, and buses ran at the same frequencies as the tram during the daytime. Optare Solo midibuses were originally used on the route following its launch, with the route later upgraded to use Alexander Dennis Enviro200s.

The SL1 and SL1A services were withdrawn on 1 June 2020, with local bus service 57 being enhanced to provide better links with the tram from Hillsborough instead of Middlewood. Due to public pressure, the services were reinstated two weeks later, however the SL1 and SL1A were permanently discontinued in October 2022 and replaced with half-hourly services 57 and 57A, marketed as the 'Stocksbridge Flyer'. These routes took the original routing of the SL1 and SL1A, albeit extended from Middlewood park and ride to run through to Sheffield city centre and varying between Middlewood and Worrall on the 57 and 57A respectively.

Additionally, two former SupertramLink bus services have previously operated; Supertram Link 2 (SL2) ran from the Malin Bridge tramstop to Stannington, while SupertramLink3 (SL3) operated between Crystal Peaks and Killamarsh in south Sheffield. Both of these routes have since been discontinued.

== Fleet and depots ==
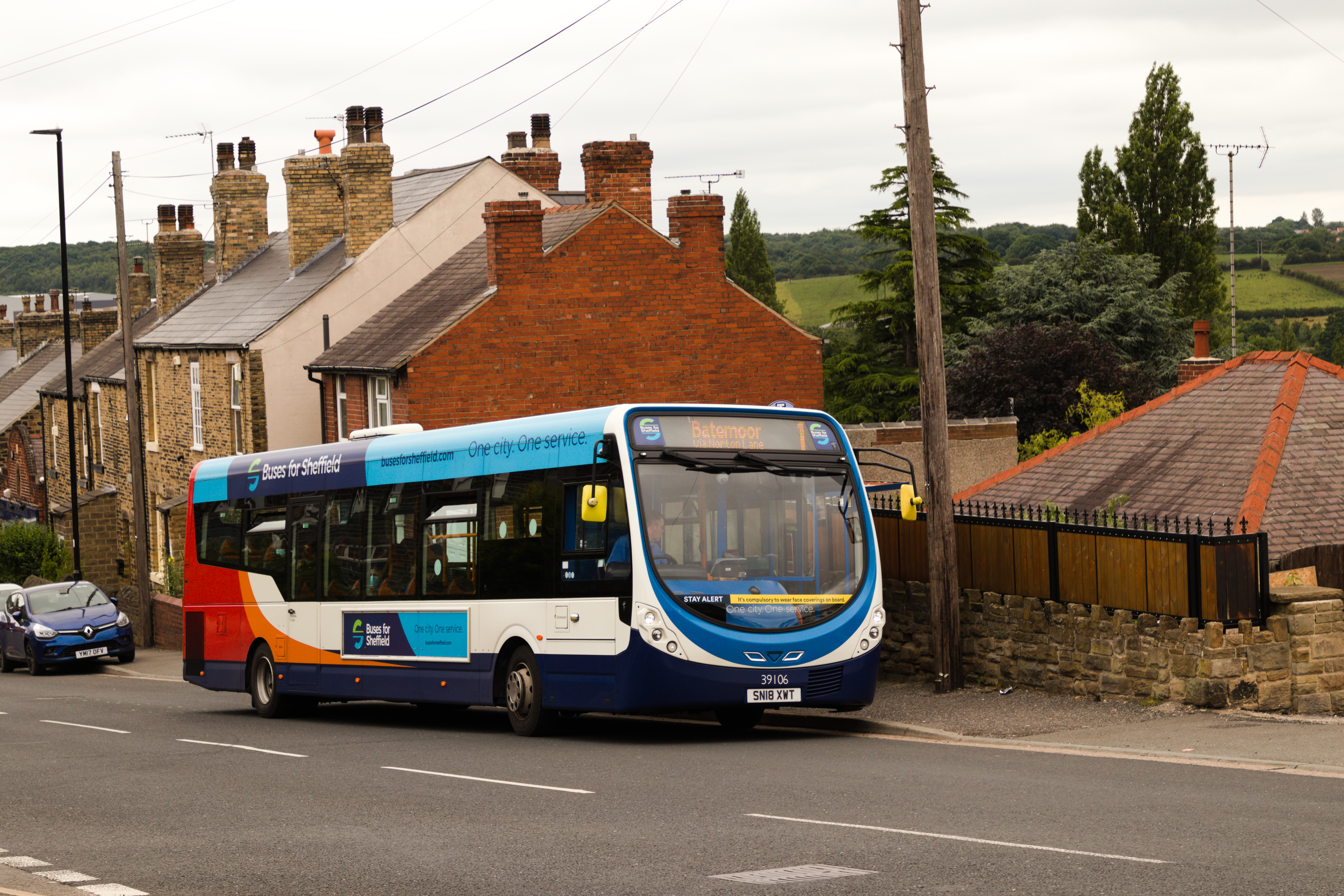
Wright StreetLite HEV in Ecclesfield in June 2021

As of December 2024, Stagecoach Yorkshire's fleet consisted of 351 buses operated from five bus depots in Barnsley, Chesterfield, Ecclesfield, Holbrook and Rawmarsh. A sixth depot in Holmfirth was transferred to Centrebus Holdings as part of the sale of the division's West Yorkshire operations in May 2008.

Stagecoach Yorkshire was among a handful of Stagecoach operators to receive Alexander Dennis Enviro400H hybrid electric buses, which were deployed to its services in the Sheffield area. The first 21 Enviro400Hs were delivered in 2011 and a further 19 were delivered in 2012. Also unique to Stagecoach Yorkshire are eighteen Wright StreetLite HEVs purchased with funding from South Yorkshire PTE for services in Sheffield in 2018.

Stagecoach Yorkshire, with assistance from the Zero-Emission Bus Regional Areas 2 (ZEBRA2) scheme, invested £31 million into battery electric buses and charging infrastructure for services operating from Chesterfield depot. This investment included 39 Alexander Dennis Enviro400EV double-deckers, twelve Yutong E12 and six Yutong E10 single-deck buses. These vehicles began to be delivered in January 2025, with vehicles seeing service as early as February 2025.

== See also ==
- List of bus operators of the United Kingdom
