= South Yorkshire Passenger Transport Executive =

Transport authority in England

- Type: Passenger Transport Executive
- Industry: Public transport
- Founded: 1 April 1974 (Local Government Act 1972)
- Defunct: 1 April 2023 (Transport Act 1985)
- Fate: Dissolved – functions transferred to SYMCA
- Headquarters: Sheffield, England
- Area served: South Yorkshire

South Yorkshire Passenger Transport Executive (SYPTE) was the passenger transport executive for South Yorkshire. It was responsible for implementing policies set by the South Yorkshire Passenger Transport Authority (SYPTA) and for operation of the Authority's bus fleet from its formation in 1974 until its dissolution in 2023, when its assets and duties were transferred to the South Yorkshire Mayoral Combined Authority.

== History ==
=== Formation and pre-privatisation (1974–1986) ===
The South Yorkshire Passenger Transport Authority and Executive were founded in April 1974. The PTE inherited the bus fleets of Sheffield, Rotherham and Doncaster councils and operated the majority of bus services in the metropolitan county of South Yorkshire, except the Barnsley area which continued to be served by the Yorkshire Traction Company, part of the National Bus Company.

=== Post-privatisation (1986–2006) ===
==== Bus operations ====
From 1986 until 1993, buses were operated by an arms length company, South Yorkshire Transport, until a management buyout created the bus operating company Mainline Group. Shortly after Stagecoach purchased a 20% stake in the company, however this was sold in 1995 to FirstBus.

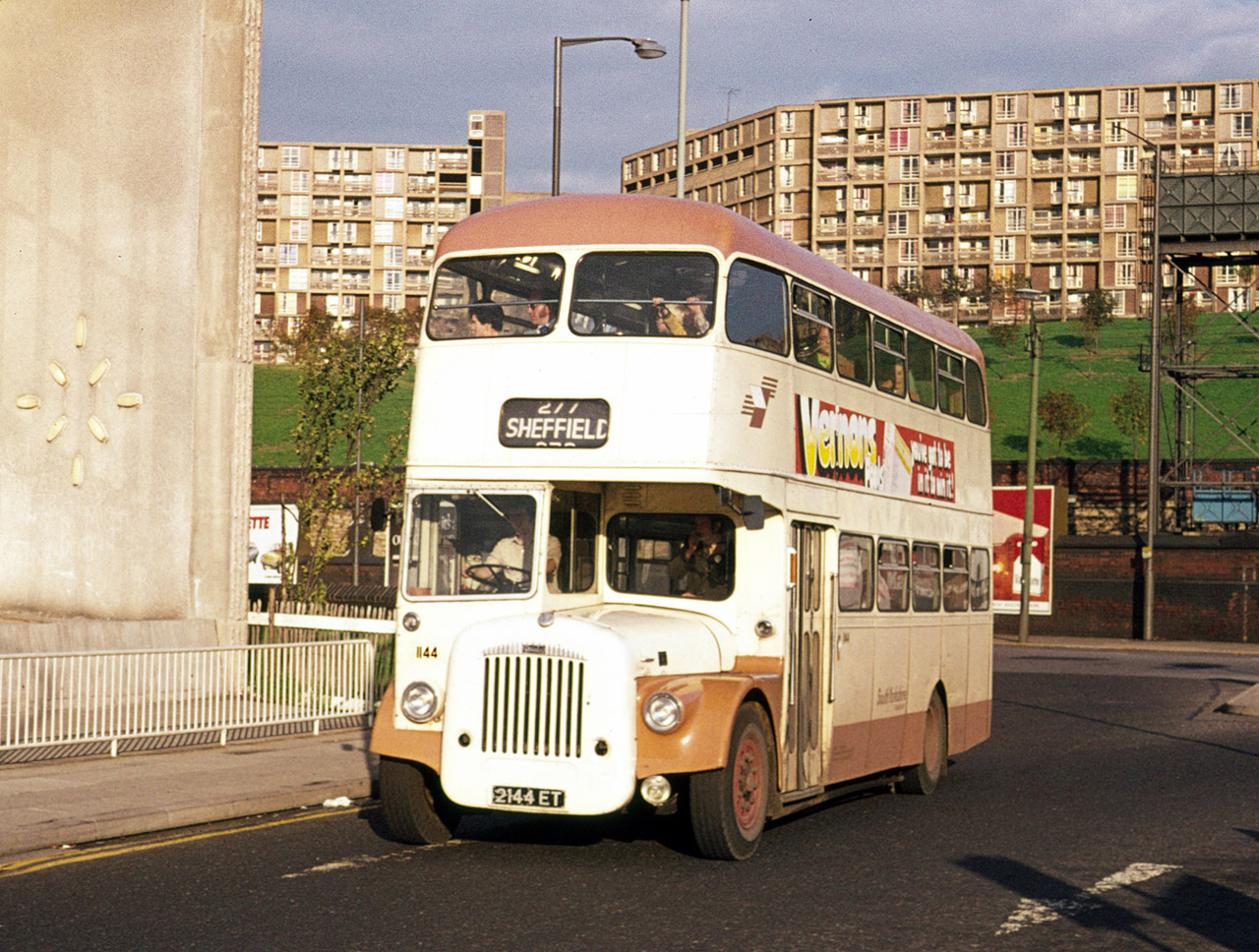
SYPTE Daimler CVG6 in Sheffield in September 1976

==== Supertram launch ====
After detailed planning, a new tram network in Sheffield was approved by Act of Parliament in 1991. Three years later in 1994, the Sheffield Supertram was opened, returning tram services to Sheffield after 34 years. It was initially publicly operated, but was privatised in 1997 after encountering major operational problems. Stagecoach operated the trams until March 2024 when the SYMCA brought the trams back into public ownership.

==== New stations and interchanges ====
Eleven new stations were opened by SYPTE between 1983 and 1993. Many of these were re-opened former stations previously closed in the 1960s under the Beeching cuts, but not all; Goldthorpe and Thurnscoe were entirely new stations, Rotherham Central was built to replace the closing Rotherham Masborough which was further away from Rotherham town centre, and Meadowhall Interchange was built to serve the new Meadowhall Shopping Centre.

In addition to these new stations, many existing interchanges were refurbished during the early 2000s. These helped to provide a hub for local, regional and sometimes national bus and coach services, and in some locations also provide an interchange facility onto trams and passenger rail services.

=== Re-branding as Travel South Yorkshire (2006–2023) ===
The South Yorkshire public transport network, of which SYPTE is a key deliverer of passenger services, was re-branded as Travel South Yorkshire in 2006. Changes included the introduction of the YourNextBus scheme on all stops as well as the addition LED departure boards on the region's most often run routes at certain stops.

==== Tram-train ====
In October 2018, the new tram-train line between Cathedral and the newly built Rotherham Parkgate tram stop was opened. It was the first tram-train service in the UK, and acted as a pilot scheme for determining the viability of other tram-train projects. On the opening day, an accident caused by a lorry derailed one of the new tram-trains, temporarily suspending services. Faults found on the trains caused some further disruption in 2019.

=== SYPTE dissolution and transfer ===
On 1 April 2023, the executive was legally dissolved via an order made under the Transport Act 1985, with all of its functions and assets being transferred to South Yorkshire Mayoral Combined Authority. The Travel South Yorkshire brand is still used as the customer facing brand for its transport services.

== Operations ==
=== Infrastructure and travel interchanges ===
SYPTE was responsible for all the bus stops, shelters and bus interchanges in the county, along with park & ride sites. It was also responsible for the Sheffield Supertram network infrastructure.

Travel South Yorkshire's interchanges at Sheffield, Arundel Gate in Sheffield, Rotherham, Barnsley, Doncaster, Hillsborough and Dinnington provide information and advice about public transport in South Yorkshire. From these interchanges, information can be obtained and a range of multi-modal (TravelMaster) tickets can be bought from self-serve vending machines. Other travel passes which were previously available at 'Information Centre' desks at these interchanges are now only available from the Travel South Yorkshire website or over the phone from Traveline.

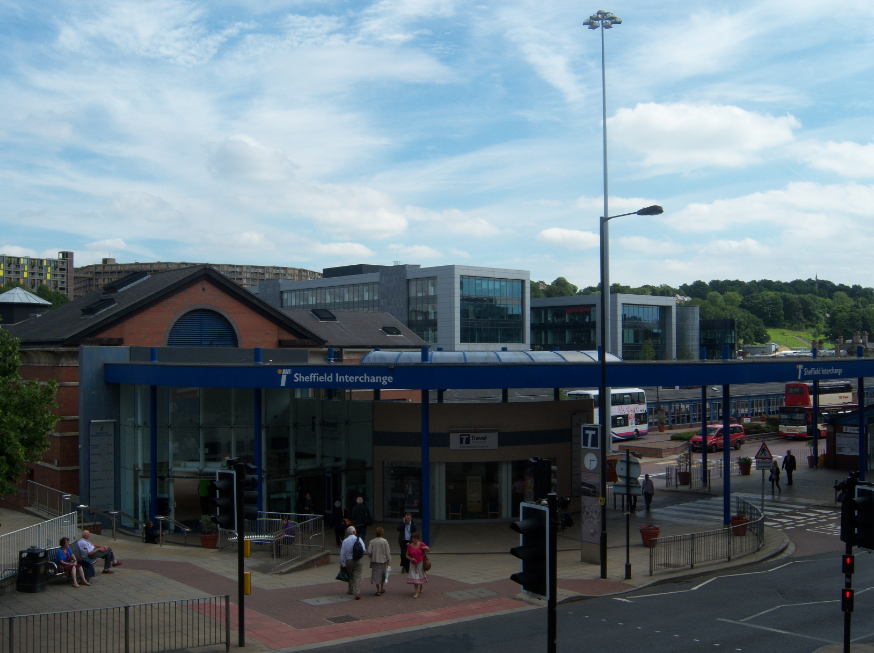
Sheffield Interchange

=== Timetable information ===
SYPTE provided timetable information for all bus and train services within South Yorkshire. This was found at stops, in the form of timetable leaflets, information on the web and a telephone enquiry service called Traveline.

=== Ticketing and concessions ===
SYPTE sold a range of multi-modal tickets on behalf of the public transport operators of South Yorkshire, including countywide TravelMaster tickets. These were generally in the form of smart card tickets and are commercial products which do not receive a subsidy. It also administered the concessionary travel schemes for young people and students, senior citizens and the mobility impaired. Many of these schemes have continued since SYPTE's dissolution.

=== Transport services ===
SYPTE was responsible for various public transport services in the county, including various subsidised bus services.

== Projects ==
=== South Yorkshire Supertram ===
The first sections of the South Yorkshire Supertram were opened in 1994. It initially ran mostly within Sheffield and was made up of three lines: Yellow, Blue, Purple. Since then a tram-train line has been created extending the network out to Rotherham Parkgate.

=== Trolleybus experiment ===
In 1985, the SYPTE purchased an Alexander RH bodied Dennis Dominator trolleybus with a view to reintroducing a trolleybus network. A one mile section on Sandall Beat Road alongside Doncaster Racecourse was wired. However with deregulation in 1986, the project was shelved.

== Awards ==
=== National Transport Awards ===
- Integrated Transport Authority of the Year (2013).
- Technology Award for the GetThereSooner project.
- Rail Station of the Year.
- Joe Clarke Passenger Transport Authority of the Year.

=== Institution of Highways and Transportation Awards ===
- IHT/Mouchel Parkman Accessibility Award for Sheffield Station.

=== Yorkshire Renaissance Awards ===
- Rail Project Award for Sheffield Station.

=== UK Bus Awards ===
- Local Authority Bus Project of the Year Award for Sheffield Bus Partnership (2013).
- Making Buses a Better Choice Award for Sheffield Bus Partnership (2013).

=== Secure Stations scheme ===
- Crime Prevention charity Crime Concern's Award for Meadowhall Interchange, Swinton and Adwick.

TravelWise Awards

- Best Travel Awareness Event Award for Carbon Quids campaign.

Institution of Civil Engineers' Yorkshire & Humber Awards

- Award for Excellence for Barnsley Interchange.

Light Rail Awards

- Project of the Year Award for the £3m Supertram revamp.

Rail Business Awards

- Station Excellence Award for Rotherham Central station.

Local Government Chronicle (LGC) Awards

- Most Innovative Service Delivery Model Award for Sheffield Bus Partnership.
