= First South Yorkshire =

Bus operator in South Yorkshire, England

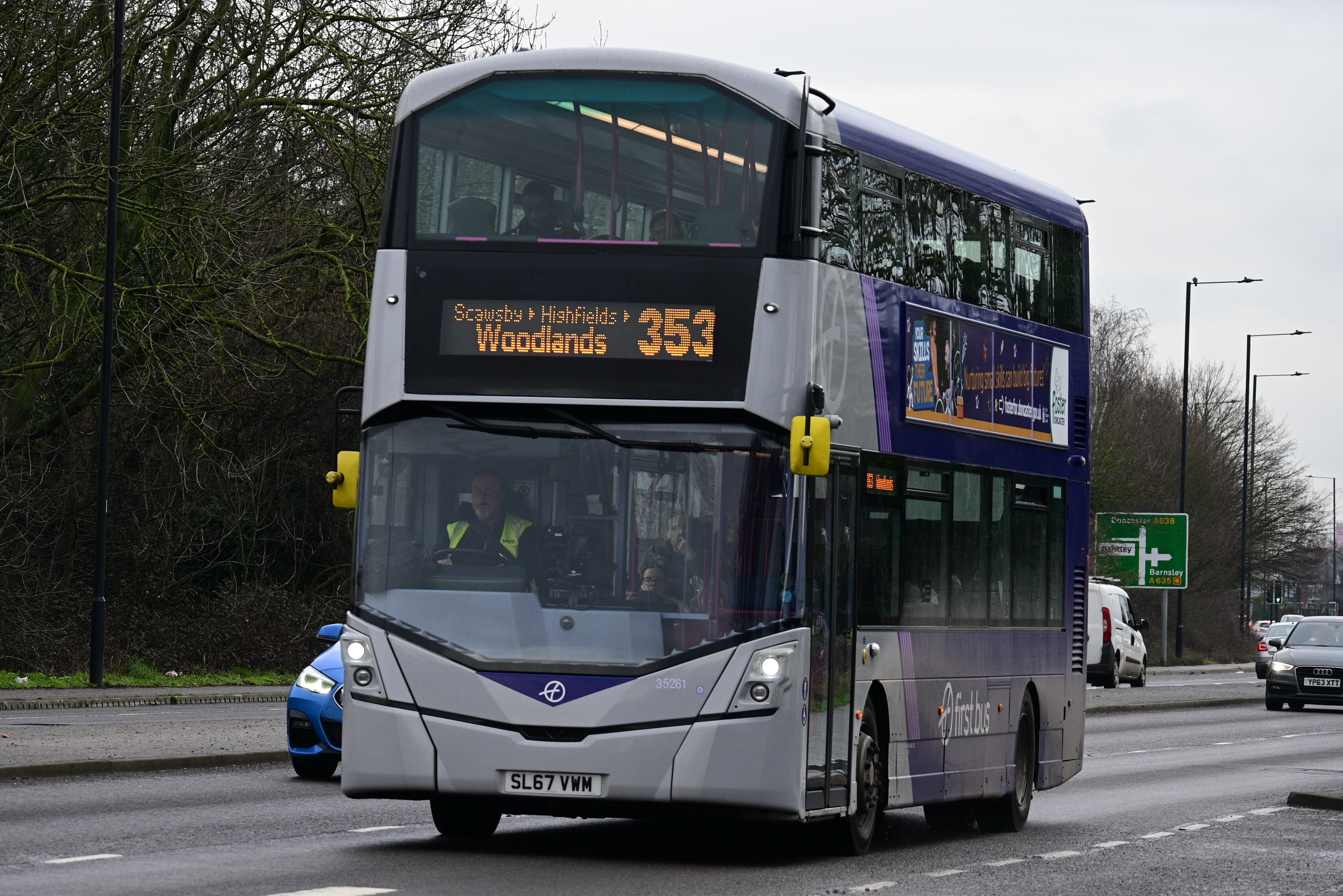
- Wright StreetDeck in Scawsby, Doncaster in February 2026
- Parent: FirstGroup
- Founded: 1998; 28 years ago
- Headquarters: Abbey Lane, Leicester
- Service area: Doncaster; North East Derbyshire; Peak District; Rotherham; Sheffield; Chesterfield; North Lincolnshire
- Service type: Bus services
- Depots: 2
- Fleet: 332 (December 2024)
- Managing Director: Zoe Hands
- Website: firstbus.co.uk/south-yorkshire

First South Yorkshire is a major bus operator providing bus services within and across South Yorkshire. It is a subsidiary of FirstGroup.

== History ==
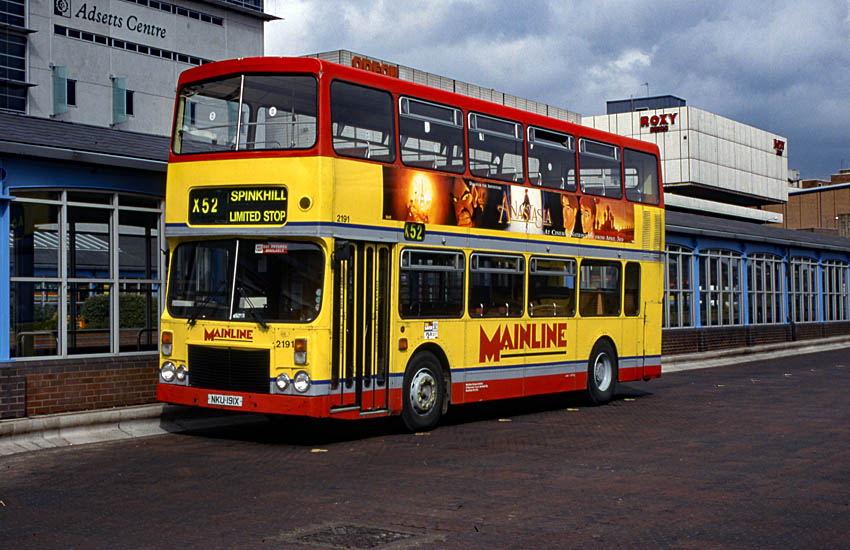
Walter Alexander bodied Dennis Dominator at Sheffield bus station, 1998

In 1989, South Yorkshire Transport introduced the Mainline brand on certain bus routes around South Yorkshire. Buses operated with Sheffield Mainline names in a bright red and yellow livery, replacing the previous "coffee and cream" livery. It was followed by Doncaster Mainline in a silver grey and red livery relieved by a light yellow band and finally Rotherham Mainline, whose buses were painted blue and yellow. In 1992, the local brands were dropped and Mainline became the standard fleetname across the company's operating area. A common red and yellow livery with silver and blue bands was introduced.

In November 1993, Mainline was sold to its employees in a management buyout. Shortly after, Stagecoach Holdings purchased a 20% stake in the company, however this stake was ordered to be divested by the Office of Fair Trading in 1995. The stake in Mainline would be purchased from Stagecoach by FirstBus for £1.6 million in January 1996.

In 1998, FirstBus purchased the remaining 80% shareholding and renamed the business First Mainline. Buses were repainted in a simplified red and yellow livery, reminiscent of the original 1989 Sheffield Mainline livery. In 2000 First Mainline was rebranded as First South Yorkshire and the corporate light grey, blue and pink livery introduced.

In 2013, First South Yorkshire began to paint buses into First's new Olympia corporate livery, which is an updated version of the former livery. At the same time, the individual First Sheffield, First Rotherham, First Doncaster and First X78 brands were introduced. The First X78 brand was superseded by the Steel Link brand in 2015, while the First Rotherham brand was retired with the closure of the Rotherham depot in 2017.

The operations of First South Yorkshire and First Midlands, consisting of First Potteries, First Leicester and First Worcester, merged on 1 June 2020 to form First South Yorkshire & Midlands. The new company would be managed by First Midlands CEO, Nigel Eggleton. The aim of this merger was to revitalise bus services in both merger regions, following a period of poor customer service by First South Yorkshire.

== Services ==
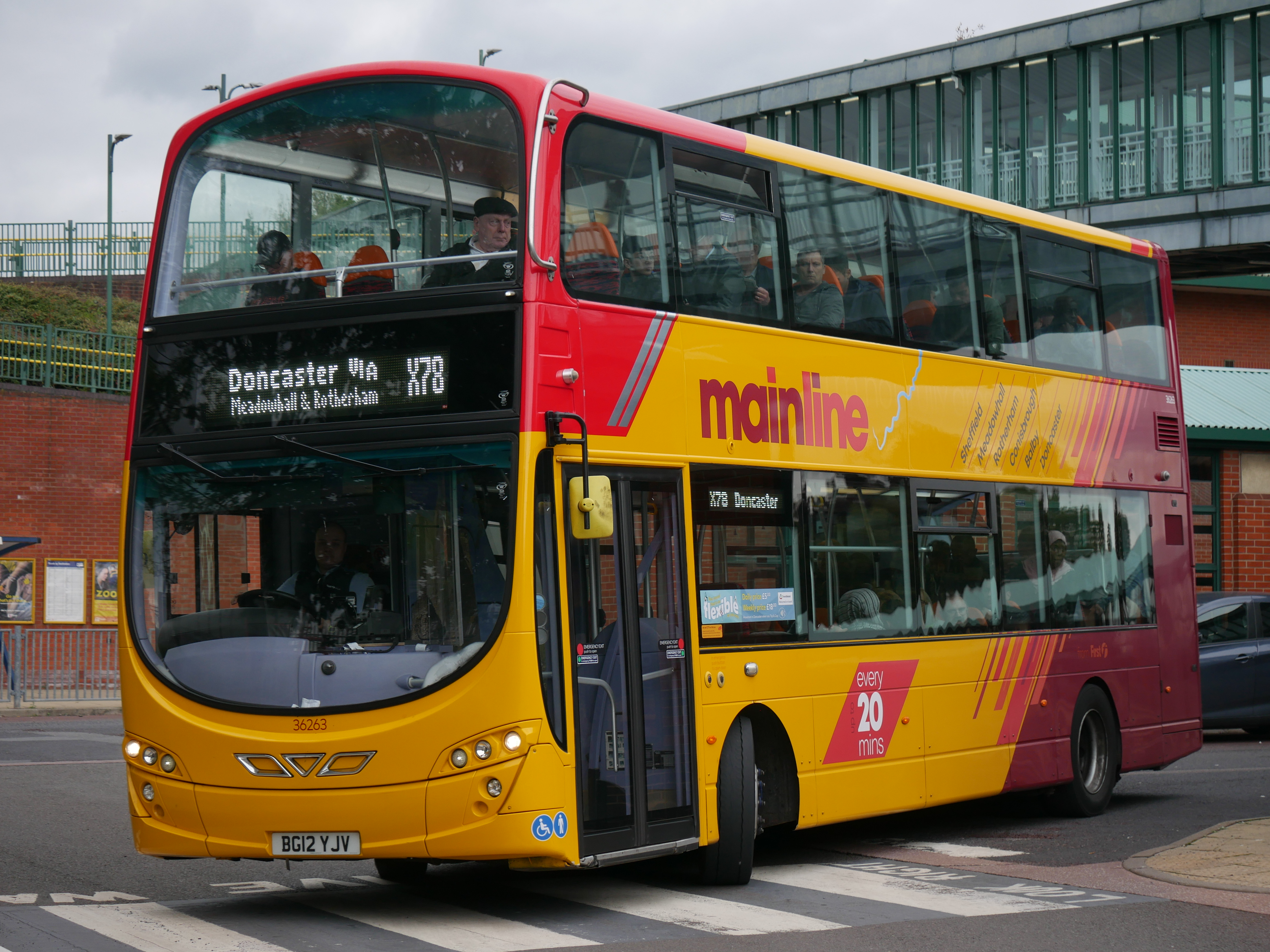
'Mainline' branded Wright Eclipse Gemini 2 at Meadowhall Interchange in September 2022

First South Yorkshire operate services in Doncaster, Rotherham and Sheffield. Due to bus services history and number changes, some routes share service numbers within South Yorkshire.

Route X78 is an express service which runs from Sheffield Interchange to Doncaster Frenchgate Interchange via Meadowhall, Rotherham and Conisbrough. In 2016, 22 Wright StreetDecks, some of which were originally intended for the Steel Link, were placed in service on the X78 as part of an initiative to improve Rotherham's bus services.

In September 2016, Steel Link X1 express route commenced operating from Sheffield to Maltby via the Bus Rapid Transit North scheme. Eighteen Wright StreetDecks with high-specification interiors were purchased for the service.

First South Yorkshire also operate Peak District services 271 and 272, from Sheffield, across the South Yorkshire boundary and into Derbyshire in the Peak District. In 2021, a double-decker bus was branded in green 'Peak Link' livery for these services. In May 2025 First South Yorkshire received a batch of 7 2022 low-height Wright StreetDecks for the service.

== Fleet ==
As of December 2024, First South Yorkshire's fleet consists of 332 buses.

Following the First South Yorkshire and Midlands merger in 2020, new liveries and brands were introduced for the First Sheffield and First Doncaster fleets. The first to be introduced was Doncaster's Clever Buses in August 2020, utilising eight acquired Volvo B7RLE Wright Eclipse Urban buses on the 66 route in Doncaster, with the 'clever' aspect of the name referencing new contactless payment systems that were being introduced across the fleet.

In December 2020, two new liveries to be applied across the Sheffield and Doncaster fleets were revealed. The new First Sheffield livery is predominantly blue and cream with chrome elements referencing Sheffield's steel heritage, with some buses carrying livery variants referencing Sheffield's snooker and music heritage. First Doncaster's new livery follows a similar layout with red and cream with purple elements. Both liveries reference the former liveries of Sheffield and Doncaster's municipal bus companies before they were absorbed into the South Yorkshire Passenger Transport Executive in 1974.

== Depots ==
First South Yorkshire vehicles operate from two depots. These are Olive Grove in Sheffield, and Leger Way in Doncaster.

Sheffield's Olive Grove depot is the second biggest bus depot in the UK after First Glasgow's Caledonia depot, which can hold 450 buses. As of May 2017, 318 buses are based at Olive Grove depot.

Bus services in Rotherham and surrounding areas were previously operated out of the former Midland Road depot in east Rotherham. Having previously been contracted with refurbishing over 200 of London Buses' AEC Routemasters when operated by South Yorkshire Transport, the engineering works of this depot was used as the FirstGroup's Commercial Unit following the company's purchase in 1998. Buses and coaches across the group would be sent to the Midland Road works for refurbishment, repairs and repainting. In 2016, however, it was announced that the depot and Commercial Unit were to close in February 2017, with Rotherham's bus services being relocated to Olive Grove and Leger Way depots. At the time of closure, 90 buses were based at Midland Road.
