= Magna tram-train station =

Tram-train station in South Yorkshire, England

Magna
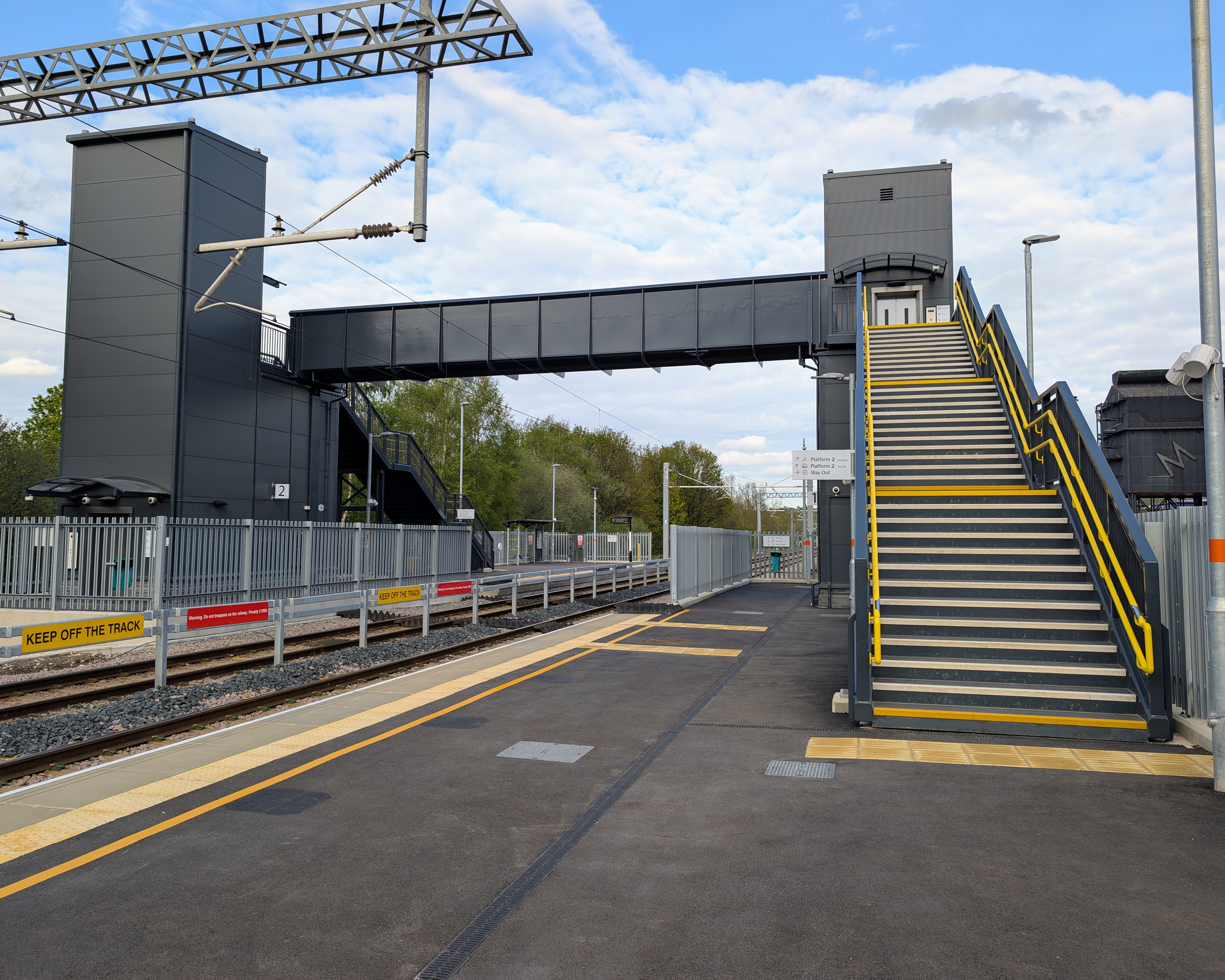
- Platform 1 at Magna, looking towards the footbridge and platform 2

General information
- Location: Magna Way; Templeborough, Rotherham
- Coordinates: 53°25′13″N 1°23′21″W
- Transit authority: South Yorkshire People's Network
- Platforms: 2
- Tram routes: TT

Construction
- Structure type: At-grade
- Parking: 100 spaces, park and ride
- Accessible: Yes

History
- Opened: 9 April 2026
- Original company: South Yorkshire Supertram
Location
- Location within South Yorkshire

Magna is a tram-train station on the South Yorkshire Supertram network. Located on the Dearne Valley line between Rotherham Central and Tinsley Meadowhall South, the station serves the Magna Science Adventure Centre and also operates as a park and ride site with 100 car parking spaces. Magna station opened on 9 April 2026.

== History ==
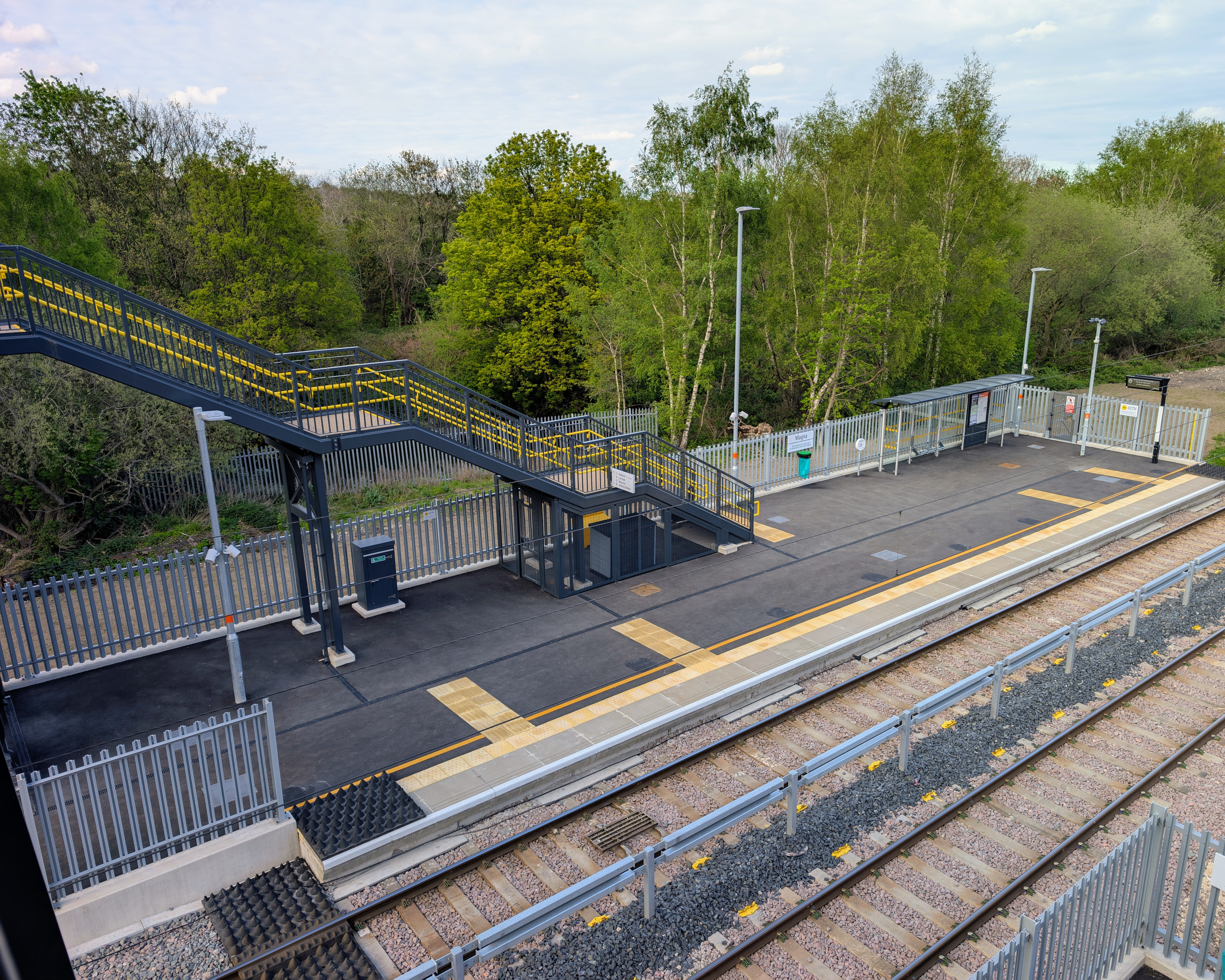
Platform 2 at Magna.

The tram-train extension of the South Yorkshire Supertram network between Tinsley Meadowhall South in Sheffield and Parkgate in Rotherham opened on 25 October 2018. There had been proposals for a station at Templeborough to serve the Magna Science Adventure Centre from the beginning of the tram-train project, however no station was constructed for the initial opening and tram-trains passed through without stopping.

In July 2021, a public consultation was opened about plans to build a new stop on the tram-train route at Magna. In March 2024, Network Rail and the South Yorkshire Mayoral Combined Authority (SYMCA) approved construction of the new Magna station. The construction was estimated to cost £6.6 million and was funded from the SYMCA's £166 million Transforming Cities Fund.

Construction of the new Magna station commenced in March 2025, with work primarily taking place during planned line closures over weekends during which tram-train services through the area were suspended. The steel footbridge between the two platforms was fabricated by AmcoGiffen at their factory in nearby Barnsley; it was lowered into place by crane during an engineering blockade in October 2025, marking a major construction milestone.

The station opened on 9th April 2026.

== Layout ==
Magna station is located on a twin-track section of the Dearne Valley line, which is owned and maintained by Network Rail rather than Supertram. There are two staggered low-level tram platforms, one facing each track, providing level boarding access to the tram-trains. The two platforms are connected via a footbridge which features lifts on each side for wheelchair accessibility, a unique feature on the Supertram network. (Note: Other Supertram stops predominantly feature pelican crossings or barrow crossings at each end of a pair of platforms; however, due to the tracks through Magna also being used by freight trains, this was deemed to be inappropriate for this site.) The platforms are staggered in order to discourage passengers from crossing the tracks from one platform to the other, as they might do on an ordinary tramway; a waist-level fence is installed between the two tracks for the same reason.

The station entrance is located in front of the Magna Science Adventure Centre on Magna Way, a cul-de-sac which branches from Bessemer Way in Templeborough to provide access to Magna. The entrance opens onto the Sheffield-bound platform. A new car park, containing 100 parking spaces and a bicycle parking shelter, was constructed in front of the station entrance. The opposite side of the station, behind the Rotherham-bound platform, is constrained by the River Don.

== Services ==
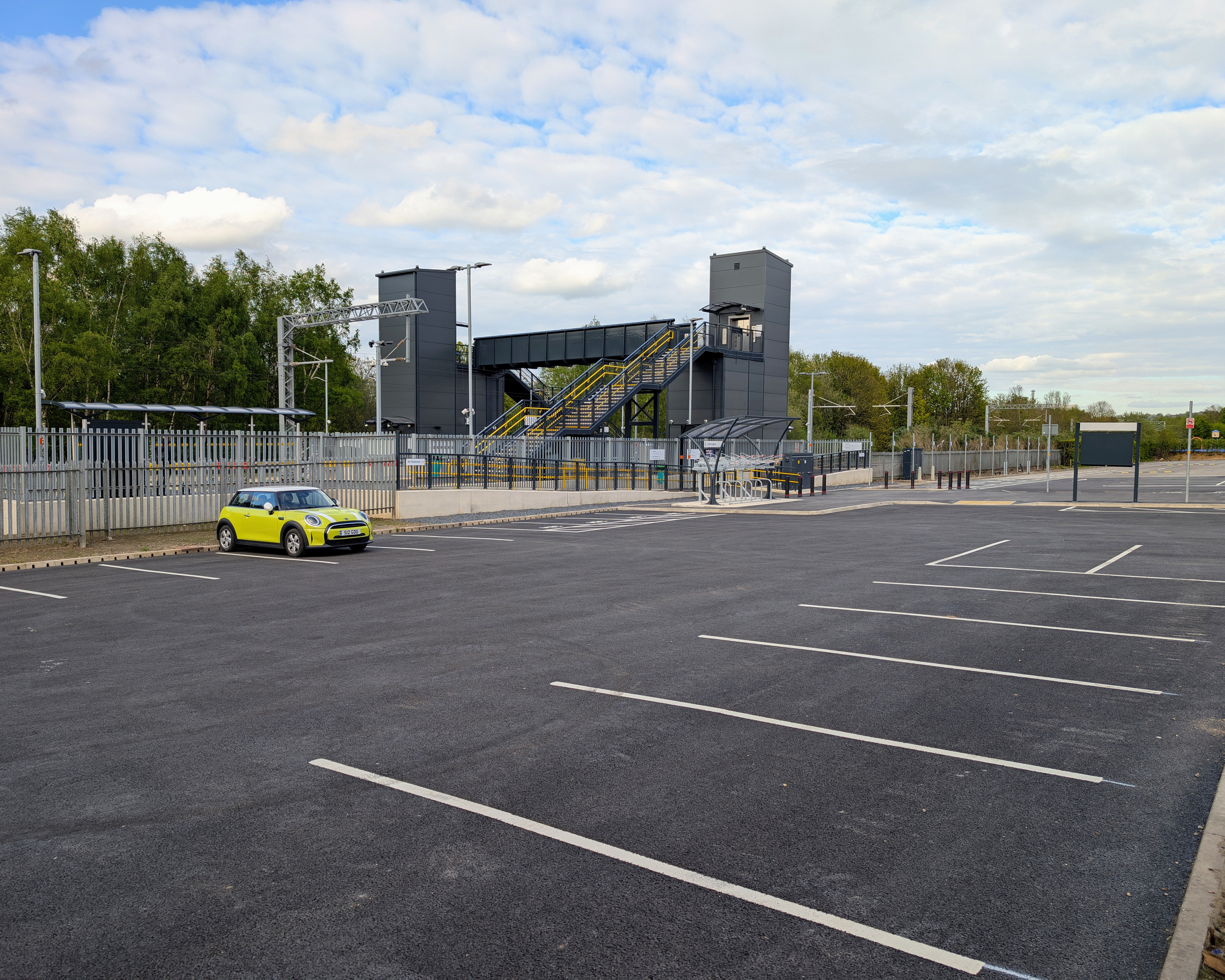
The car park at Magna, looking towards the station entrance.

The station is served by two tram-trains per hour.

Rolling stock used: Class 399 Citylink

Preceding station	South Yorkshire Supertram	Following station
Tinsley Meadowhall South towards Cathedral	Tram-Train Route	Rotherham Central towards Rotherham Parkgate
