= Sheffield College tram stop =

Sheffield College tram stop may refer to:

- Granville Road The Sheffield College tram stop, serving The Sheffield College City Campus;
- Moss Way for Peaks College tram stop, serving The Sheffield College Peaks Campus.
