= Meadowhall (shopping centre) =

Indoor shopping centre in Sheffield, South Yorkshire, England

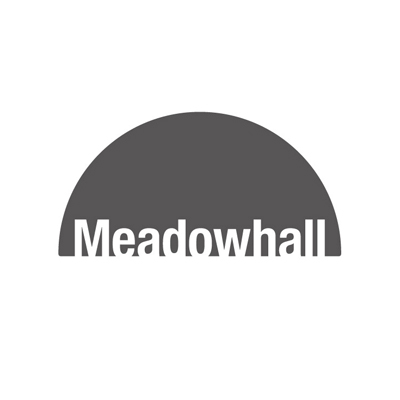

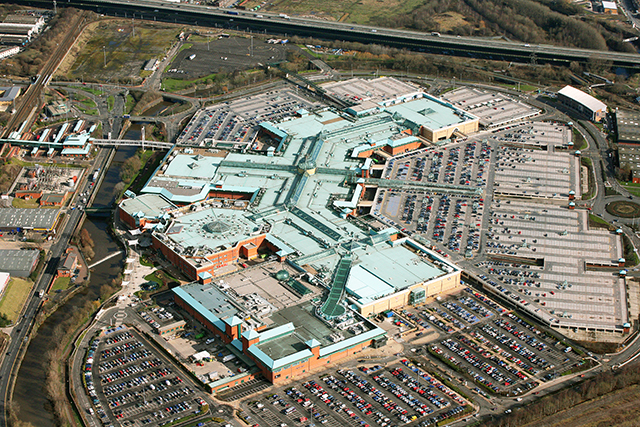
- Aerial view of Meadowhall
- Location: Sheffield, South Yorkshire, England
- Coordinates: 53.414430°N 1.410949°W
- Opened: 4 September 1990; 36 years ago
- Owner: Norges Bank Investment Management
- Num. of stores: 269
- Num. of anchor tenants: 10
- Floor area: 1,500,000 sq ft (139,355 m^{2})
- Floors: 2
- Parking: 12,000 spaces
- Public transit: Y Meadowhall Interchange; Y TT Meadowhall South
- Website: meadowhall.co.uk

Meadowhall is an indoor shopping centre in Sheffield, South Yorkshire, England. It lies 3 miles (5 km) north-east of Sheffield city centre, and 2 miles (3 km) from Rotherham town centre. It is the largest shopping centre in Yorkshire, and currently the twelfth-largest in the United Kingdom. As of 2021, plans for an extension are currently under consideration, for completion in the 2020s, which would make Meadowhall the 11th largest shopping centre in the United Kingdom.

Architecturally, the original construction of Meadowhall in the early 1990s was inspired by the Place d'Orléans shopping centre in Ottawa, Canada. The Meadowhall Retail Park is a separate development, owned by British Land, lying almost 1 mile (1.6 km) to the south of Meadowhall shopping centre in the Carbrook area of the city.

== History ==
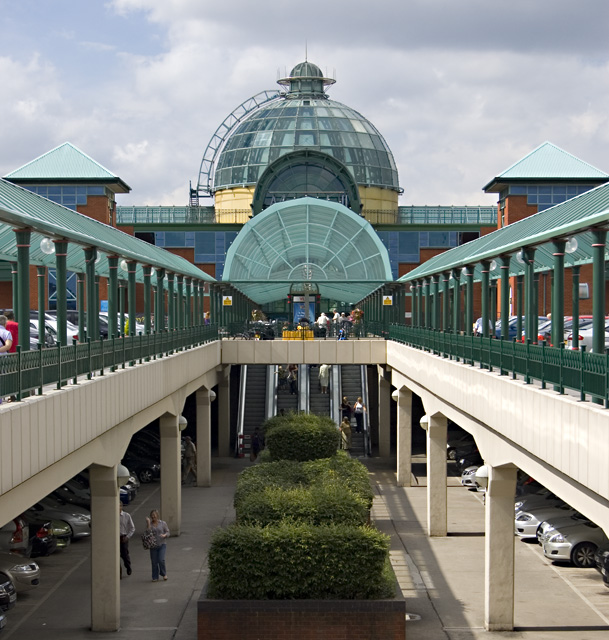
Meadowhall

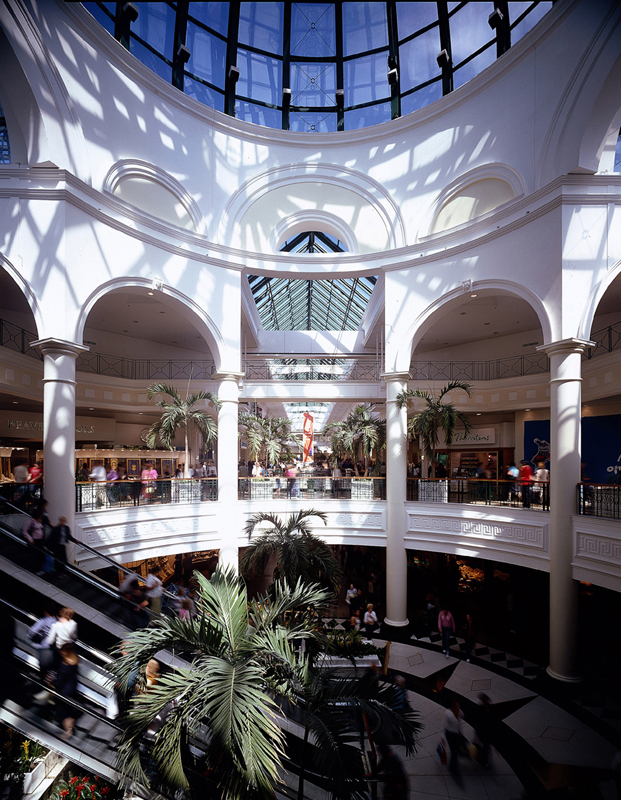
Meadowhall interior before refurbishment

The shopping centre was built by Bovis on the site previously occupied by Hadfields' East Hecla steelworks.

The centre was opened on 4 September 1990. With a floor area of 139,355 m^{2} (1,500,005 sq ft), it is the twelfth-largest (second-largest when first opened) shopping centre in the UK. It is similar in concept to the Merry Hill Shopping Centre at Brierley Hill in the West Midlands, which was completed just before Meadowhall.

With over 280 stores, Meadowhall has been widely blamed for the closure of shops in both Sheffield City Centre, and Rotherham town centre. Meadowhall is wholly owned by Norges Bank Investment Management (NBIM) and is managed by British Land. The centre attracted 19.8 million visitors in its first year of opening, and now attracts about 30 million visitors a year.

In October 2006, Meadowhall executed a major £91 million phased refurbishment - the largest since the centre opened in 1990. The project included a £43 million reconfiguration of the former Sainsbury's unit in the Market Street area to create large flagship stores for Next and Primark, alongside a £48 million refurbishment across all main mall areas. Improvements included the construction of a new upper-level mall linking the two anchor stores, the addition of a glazed atrium, new cafés, lifts, and staircases, as well as well as upgraded shop fronts and modernised interiors. The redevelopment also incorporated several environmental initiatives, including a rainwater and condensation harvesting system and the opening of an on-site Resource Recovery Centre, making Meadowhall the first shopping centre in the United Kingdom to process its own waste through a conveyor-belt recycling system.

One of Meadowhall's largest former tenants, Sainsbury's, closed in July 2005 and was replaced by new Next and Primark stores in the summer of 2007. The Namco Station arcade in The Oasis food court also closed in September 2007, after operating at the shopping centre for more than 15 years. In December 2005, Meadowhall became home to the fifth Apple Store in the UK, and later in 2007, the centre opened the third Puma Store in the UK, after London and Glasgow. The centre was also home to the only McCafé in Yorkshire, which no longer exists. The centre's Burger King, located on Market Street (now known as The Gallery) was replaced by a small franchise called Burger Knight in October 2007. In May 2008, Meadowhall forcibly shut five businesses in the Market Street area: Massarella's Coffee, Greggs, Burger Knight, Crawshaws Butchers, and Pollards Tea & Coffee. The closures formed part of a redevelopment plan to create larger retail units, despite the area having recently undergone refurbishment following the June 2007 floods.

In October 2012, NBIM announced that the Norwegian Government Pension Fund Global had bought 50 per cent of the UK shopping centre Meadowhall for £348 million, or approximately 3.2 billion Norwegian kroner.

In 2014, the mall 'Park Lane' was refurbished in the style of a "boutique arcade". In 2017, Park Lane was modernised during the 2015–2017 £60 million refurbishment, and is now seen as the most upmarket area of Meadowhall, with stores such as Pretty Green, Flannels, Hugo Boss, White Stuff and Zara.

An agreement between NBIM and British Land was signed on 18 May 2024 for NBIM to acquire the remaining 50% stake of the Meadowhall estate, completing on 12 July 2024. The cost of the acquisition was £360 million, valuing the property at £720 million, with NBIM taking on the £426 million of debt that the property was encumbered with at the time of the agreement.

British Land stated that proceeds from the sale are expected to be £156 million after net debt of £200 million. As part of the agreement British Land would remain as the asset manager of the site.

=== 2015–2017 refurbishment ===
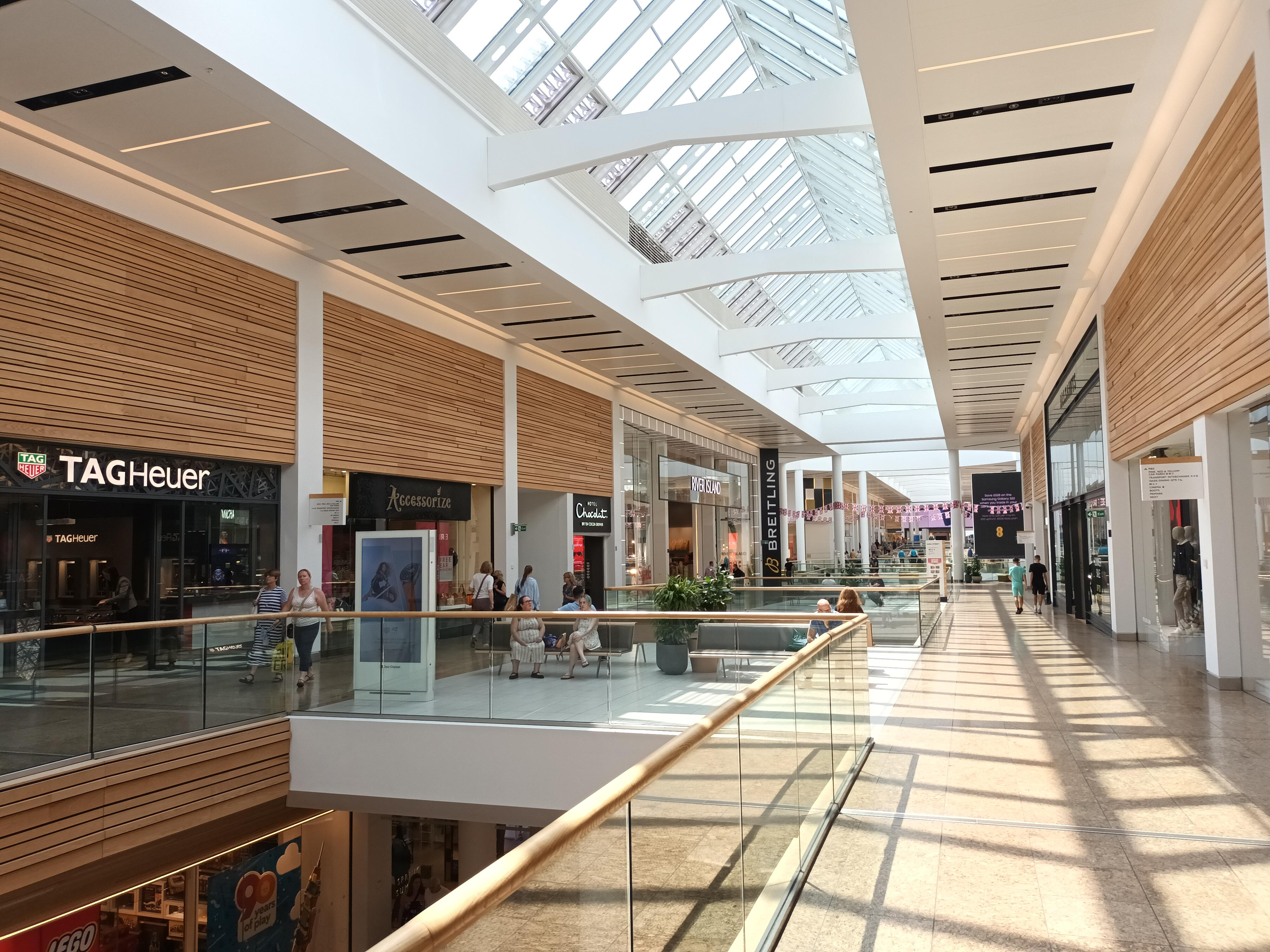
Interior of Meadowhall post-refurbishment

Meadowhall celebrated its 25th anniversary in 2015, and announced in the same year a £60 million interior refurbishment to make it fit with newer centres opened since 1990. The refurbishment allowed some retailers to install double-height shop fronts. The first phase was completed in April 2017 and the second phase was completed in November 2017 with most of the work being done when after hours so as not to disrupt shopping, each area of Meadowhall has been themed to fit a certain style. After the closure of the BHS branch in August 2016, it was announced that Primark would be expanding its store into half of the vacant store, with Sports Direct taking up the other half, and that Wilko would be moving into the store already taken up by Sports Direct; this was completed in March 2018. The House of Fraser store has also been refurbished along with the centre, as well as Apple, AllSaints, Yo! Sushi, Hollister, Schuh, JD Sports and the opening of new stores such as Tag Heuer, Flannels, Joe Browns, Skinny Dip and River Island Children making the centre being perceived as more "upmarket". Restaurants such as Handmade Burger Co and Pizza Express in the Oasis Dining quarter have also been refurbished with a new Gourmet Burger Kitchen, however this has since closed.

Scenes from the music video of the Sheffield-based duo Moloko's first single "Fun For Me" were shot in the Oasis area of the shopping centre.

== Extension ==
Announced	Plan	Outcome	Notes
May 2012	52,000 sq ft (4,800 m^{2}) retail extension on adjacent land	The plans were not approved.	In December 2014, a new Next home store and a Costa Coffee drive-thru was opened on the land where the extension was to be built. A new IKEA store opened on 28 September 2017 also on the land.
October 2016	£300 million leisure extension built on a mult-storey car park with a replacement cinema to the Oasis one, a bowling arcade, trampoline park, new restaurants, shops, garden terrace and new smaller replacement multi-storey	In May 2020, it was unlikely to go ahead due to the uncertain times caused by the COVID-19 pandemic.	New plans for the extension were unveiled in July of the same year with a temporary leisure park on the M1 distribution centre site; the new cinema was taken out of the new plans.

== Flooding incidents ==
Meadowhall was inundated by the River Don during the June 2007 floods, with water peaking at 1.8 metres (6 ft). Due to the substantial amount of damage caused, it was the first time in its 17-year history that Meadowhall was forced to shut its doors, so that a huge cleanup operation could be carried out. The centre managed to reopen six days later and trading resumed on the upper level, although the majority of stores on the ground floor remained closed for several weeks to allow their interiors to be refitted. Meadowhall fully relaunched in October 2007, and have since installed flood gates to prevent flooding from happening again in the future.

Meadowhall was also affected by the November 2019 floods on Thursday 7 November, the same night as the annual Christmas Light Switch-on. Although the event was cancelled, many people had already begun to travel for the performances. Once people had arrived public transport was already cancelled, affecting people all over South Yorkshire. With conditions growing worse across the area, many shops and businesses began to close, resulting in a number of people being left stranded in Meadowhall until the following morning. The centre itself did not suffer from any damage this time around, as a result of the improvements made to the flood defences since the events of June 2007.

== Sections ==
The main Meadowhall structure is divided into multiple areas which each have shops for differing purposes:

- High Street with a big mix of stores, banks and a bureau de change.
- The Arcade contains a wide – range shops with family fun and activities and is in the middle of the shopping centre.
- The Avenue has boutique and expensive shops and services
- The Gallery has 5 (clothes shops) of the centre's 9 anchor tenants also with cheaper stores.
- The Oasis, food and leisure space.
- The Lanes, adjacent to the Oasis, a small shopping area with 20 small, independent and specialty shops.

=== Oasis ===
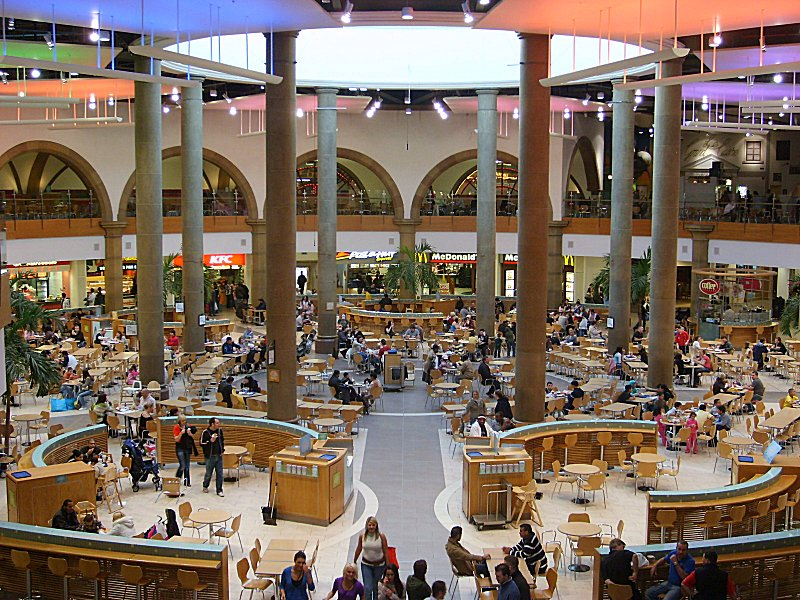
The Oasis food court before it was refurbished

The Oasis Dining Quarter is Meadowhall's food court which has food outlets and seating on both floors. The ground floor contains mostly fast food outlets, with some restaurants and a pub. The upper floor has restaurants and a cinema. In July 2011 it has £7 million redevelopment with a renaming from the 'Oasis Food Court', to the 'Oasis Dining Quarter', more restaurants were added as part of the redevelopment.

The dining quarter includes an eleven screen multiplex cinema. It opened as a Warner Bros Theatre in 1993, becoming a Warner Village Cinema and was rebranded Vue in 2004. The cinema was refurbished after the 2007 flooding.

== Transport ==
The centre is located at junction 34 of the M1 motorway. Meadowhall Interchange, is the only bus, rail and tram interchange serving a shopping centre in the UK.

=== Interchange ===
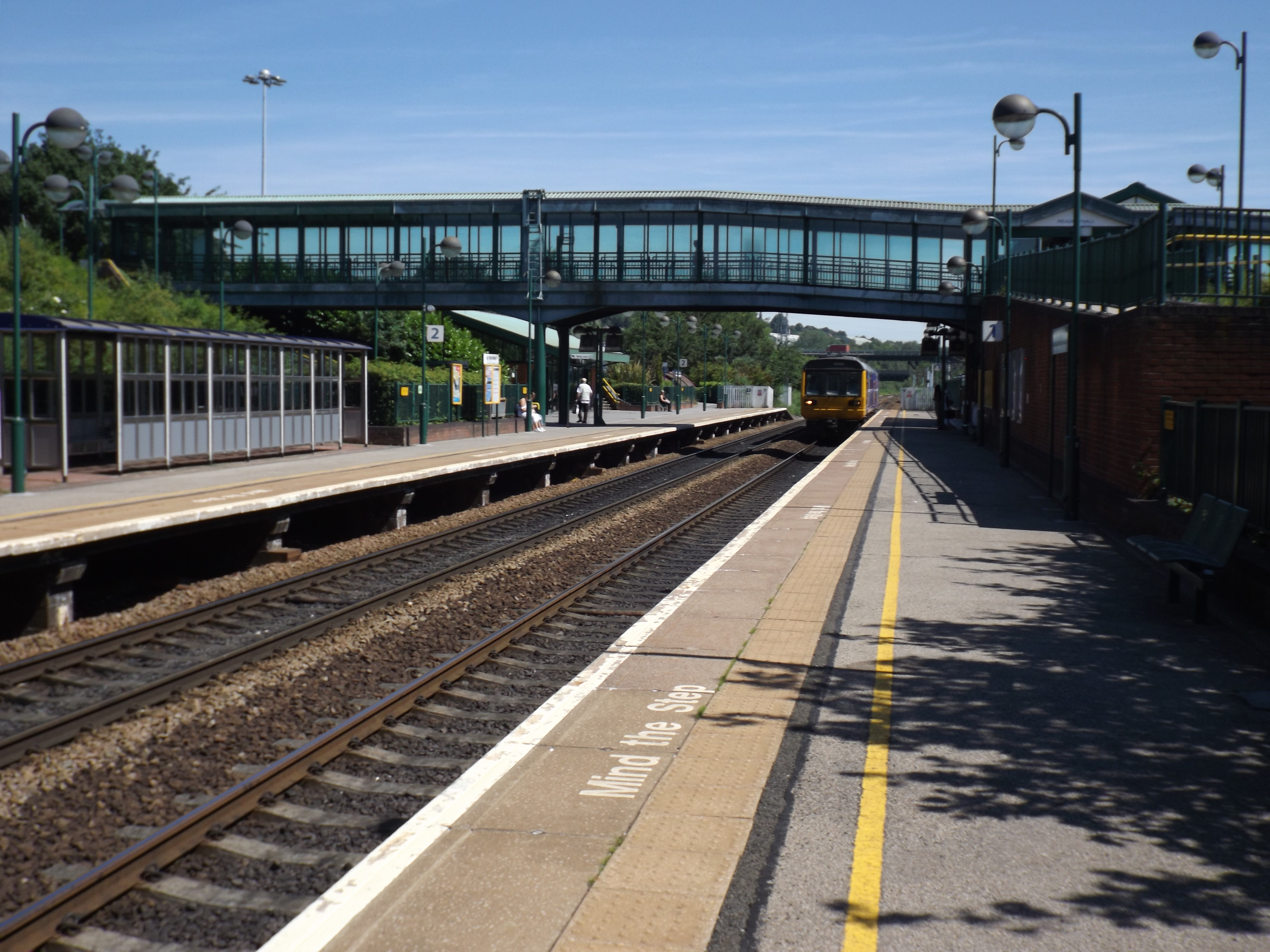
Meadowhall Interchange railway platforms

Meadowhall is served by two stops on the South Yorkshire Supertram network; the Yellow route terminus at Meadowhall Interchange is located to the north of the shopping centre, while Tinsley Meadowhall South tram stop is located to the south of the shopping centre and is served by the Yellow route and tram-train services to Rotherham Parkgate. Meadowhall Interchange tram stop is located 15 minutes from the city centre and Meadowhall is used as a park and ride. The Yellow route from Meadowhall passes the Sheffield Arena, Ice Sheffield, the Institute of Sport and the Valley Centertainment entertainment complex.

The interchange has a large bus station with routes covering most of South Yorkshire, but especially the local Sheffield and Rotherham area.

There is a multi-platform railway station at Meadowhall which has frequent links to and from Doncaster, Sheffield, Leeds and Manchester.

== Awards ==
The centre has won awards, including two awards for innovative events at the ICSC maxi awards 2006, held in Chicago and two awards for its Retail Bonding Programme (in best Retail Partnership category) and also for its commercialisation (adding value to the customer shopping experience) at the BCSC Purple Apple Awards in London.

== Environmental policy ==
The centre recycles 97% of waste from retailers and customers, with the remaining three per cent going to incineration with energy recovery; no waste goes to landfill.

Meadowhall was the first UK shopping centre to develop an on-site recycling facility. The Resource Recovery Centre, which opened in 2006, operates a conveyor belt system to separate out types of waste, from paper to plastic, cardboard to cans.

Meadowhall began to harvest rainwater in 2006. Four water storage tanks collect rainwater and condensation from air conditioning. This is then used throughout the Shopping Centre for cleaning, flushing toilets and watering the external landscaped areas. The tanks are nearly 7 metres high and can hold 6,600 imperial gallons (30,000 L) of water each.

In 2008, Meadowhall installed a bore hole. This is a narrow shaft drilled into the ground that collects water from beneath the earth. Water from the bore hole is collected into a master tank. The storage tanks are connected onto a "network", which will ensure 90–95% of all water used by customers and retailers for flushing toilets is derived from rainwater harvesting or bore hole water.

== Facial recognition trial ==
In 2018, Meadowhall was the site of a month-long police trial of facial recognition software by South Yorkshire Police, without the public's knowledge. In August 2019, a spokeswoman for British Land, Meadowhall's owner, said, "Over a year ago we conducted a short trial at Meadowhall, in conjunction with the police, and all data was deleted immediately after the trial". Big Brother Watch's chief executive Silkie Carlo was reported by the BBC as saying, "There is an epidemic of facial recognition in the UK. The collusion between police and private companies in building these surveillance nets around popular spaces is deeply disturbing".

== In popular culture ==
The South Yorkshire singer Self Esteem performed at the 2022 Glastonbury Festival wearing a bra inspired by the domes of the shopping centre, which she said had caused her to "lose her tiny mind" when it opened in her childhood.
