= List of South Yorkshire Supertram stops =

The South Yorkshire Supertram is a light rail network which operates in Sheffield and Rotherham in South Yorkshire. It is owned and operated by the South Yorkshire People's Network and the first phase of the network opened on 21 March 1994. A tram-train extension to Parkgate in Rotherham opened in October 2018. The most recent stop on the Supertram network, opened on 9 April 2026, is the Magna tram-train stop, built on the tram-train extension to Parkgate.

There are a total of four routes and 51 tram stops, all listed in the table below.

Key
B Blue
P Purple
Y Yellow
TT Tram-train (Black)

== Network diagram ==
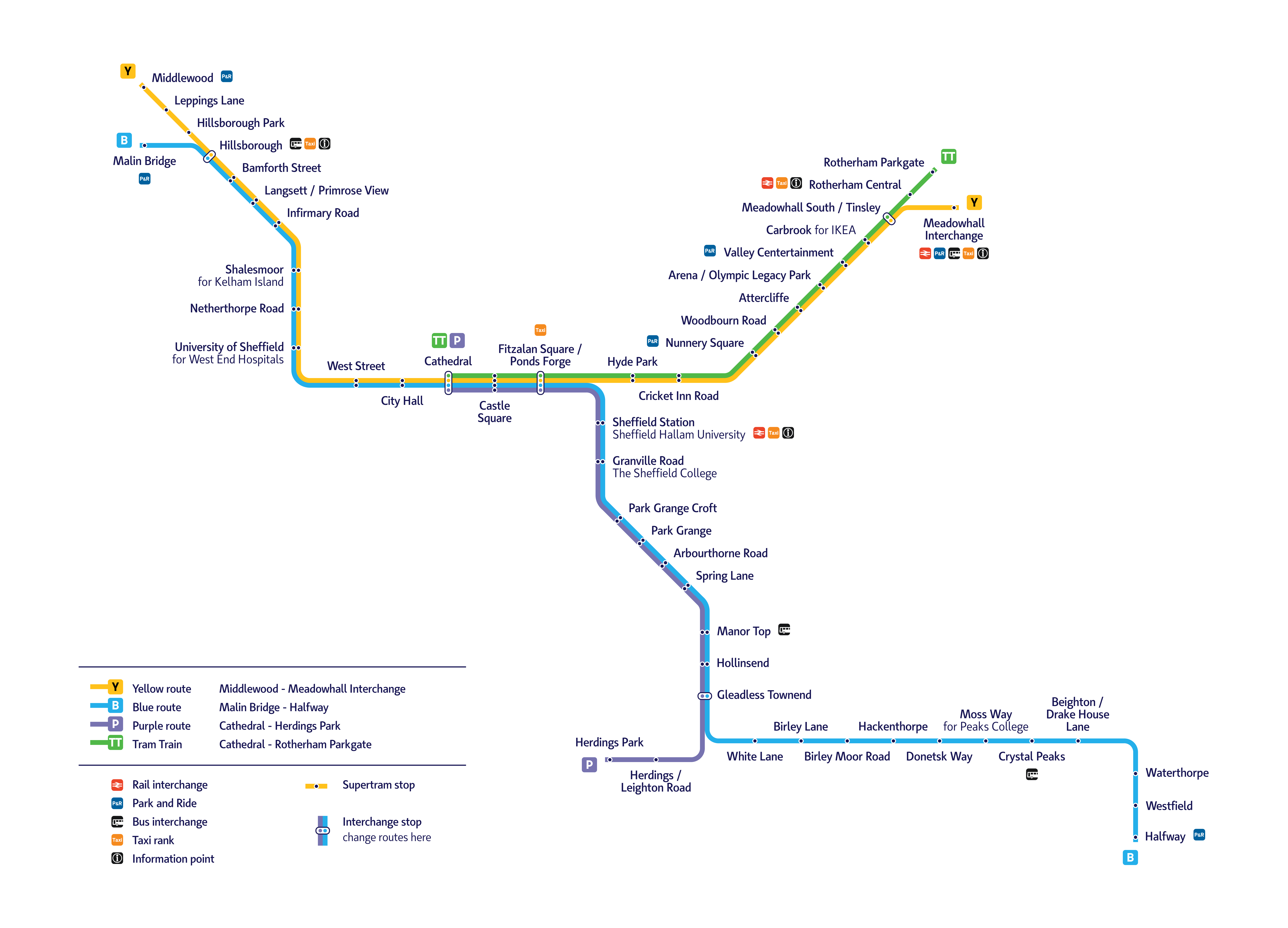
A schematic map of the Supertram network

== List of tram stops ==
Station	Photo	Opened	Routes	Location	Code (Note: Each tram stop is given a three-letter identifier code.)	Notes
Arbourthorne Road		22 August 1994	B P	Park Grange Road, Arbourthorne; 53.3634°N 1.4479°W	ARR	
Arena Olympic Legacy Park		21 March 1994	Y TT	Coleridge Road, Greenland; 53.3982°N 1.4204°W	ARS (Note: Code derived from the stop's original name, "Arena / Don Valley Stadium".)	Serves the Olympic Legacy Park, Sheffield Arena and English Institute of Sport, Sheffield. Built with double-length platforms to accommodate crowds exiting events at the arena. Opened as "Arena / Don Valley Stadium" and renamed when the stadium was demolished in 2013.
Attercliffe		21 March 1994	Y TT	Shortridge Street, Attercliffe; 53.3923°N 1.4300°W	ATT	
Bamforth Street		23 October 1995	B Y	Langsett Road, Hillsborough; 53.3989°N 1.4925°W	BAS	
Beighton Drakehouse Lane		27 March 1995	B	Eckington Way, Beighton; 53.3417°N 1.3474°W	BDH	Serves the east side of Crystal Peaks shopping centre.
Birley Lane		27 March 1995	B	Birley Lane, Birley; 53.3403°N 1.3994°W	BIL	Serves The Birley Academy and Birley Wood Golf Course.
Birley Moor Road		27 March 1995	B	Sheffield Road, Birley; 53.3416°N 1.3886°W	BMR	
Carbrook for IKEA		21 March 1994	Y TT	Lock House Road, Carbrook; 53.4055°N 1.4108°W	CAR	Serves the Sheffield IKEA store, which opened on 28 September 2017 and contains a small park and ride car park. Also serves the Meadowhall Retail Park.
Castle Square		18 February 1995	B P Y TT	Castle Square, City Centre; 53.3831°N 1.4660°W	CAS	Serves the Crucible and Lyceum Theatres, O2 Academy Sheffield, Tudor Square and the Winter Gardens. Connections available to bus services at Arundel Gate Interchange. Built on the site of the locally famous Hole in the Road roundabout, which remains outlined in the circular pattern of the paving slabs around the tram stop.
Cathedral		18 February 1995	B P Y TT	Church Street, City Centre; 53.3826°N 1.4690°W	CAT	Constructed on the front churchyard of Sheffield Cathedral. Serves the Fargate, High Street and Pinstone Street shopping area, the Peace Gardens and Sheffield Town Hall. Terminus of the Purple and Tram-train routes.
City Hall		27 February 1995	B Y	West Street, City Centre; 53.3817°N 1.4726°W	CIH	Serves Barker's Pool, Leopold Square, Orchard Square and Sheffield City Hall. Staggered platforms.
Cricket Inn Road		21 March 1994	Y TT	Cricket Inn Road, Wybourn; 53.3840°N 1.4465°W	CIR	
Crystal Peaks		27 March 1995	B	Ochre Dike Lane, Waterthorpe; 53.3417°N 1.3560°W	CRP	Serves the Crystal Peaks shopping centre and retail park and Drakehouse Retail Park, with connections to local bus services available at Crystal Peaks bus station.
Donetsk Way		27 March 1995	B	Donetsk Way, Owlthorpe; 53.3417°N 1.3702°W	DOW	Donetsk Way is named for Sheffield's twin city of Donetsk, Ukraine.
Fitzalan Square Ponds Forge		21 March 1994	B P Y TT	Fitzalan Square, City Centre; 53.3831°N 1.4638°W	FIS (Note: Formerly "COM" when the stop was named "Commercial Street".)	Serves the Ponds Forge sports centre, the Haymarket and Waingate shopping areas, the former Castle Market and The Wicker. Connections to local and national bus services available nearby at Sheffield Interchange. Opened as "Commercial Street".
Gleadless Townend		5 December 1994	B P	Ridgeway Road, Gleadless Townend; 53.3459°N 1.4259°W	GLT	Serves the Gleadless Townend shopping precinct. Interchange point between Blue and Purple routes.
Granville Road The Sheffield College		22 August 1994	B P	Granville Road, City Centre; 53.3743°N 1.4612°W	GRR	Serves The Sheffield College (City Campus) as well as All Saints Catholic High School. Closest tram stop to The Leadmill and Bramall Lane stadium, home of Sheffield United. Staggered platforms.
Hackenthorpe		27 March 1995	B	Sheffield Road, Hackenthorpe; 53.3436°N 1.3810°W	HAC	
Halfway Park and Ride		27 March 1995	B	Eckington Way, Halfway; 53.3285°N 1.3442°W	HAL	Single-platform terminus, with a park and ride car park adjacent. The platform is double-faced, with the opposite side to the tram line functioning as a bus terminus.
Herdings Leighton Road		3 April 1995	P	Norton Avenue, Herdings; 53.3424°N 1.4323°W	HLR	Serves Woodlands Primary School (East Main entrance).
Herdings Park		3 April 1995	P	Raeburn Road, Herdings; 53.3424°N 1.4392°W	HEP	Single-platform terminus, with bus terminus in turning circle nearby. Named for Herdings Park and serves the Herdings Twin Towers and Woodlands Primary School (West entrance).
Hillsborough Interchange		23 October 1995	B Y	Langsett Road, Hillsborough; 53.4019°N 1.4998°W	HIL	Located in the commercial centre of Hillsborough next to the River Loxley, with local bus connections available from the integrated bus station. Serves Hillsborough Barracks and the Tramlines Festival.
Hillsborough Park		23 October 1995	Y	Middlewood Road, Hillsborough; 53.4043°N 1.5035°W	HIP	Serves Hillsborough Park and Owlerton Stadium.
Hollinsend		5 December 1994	B P	Ridgeway Road, Hollinsend; 53.3519°N 1.4244°W	HOL	
Hyde Park		21 March 1994	Y TT	Cricket Inn Road, Hyde Park; 53.3846°N 1.4524°W	HYP	
Infirmary Road		23 October 1995	B Y	Infirmary Road, Upperthorpe; 53.3909°N 1.4825°W	INR	
Langsett Primrose View		23 October 1995	B Y	Langsett Road, Walkley; 53.3958°N 1.4893°W	LPV	
Leppings Lane		23 October 1995	Y	Middlewood Road, Owlerton; 53.4102°N 1.5041°W	LEL	Serves Hillsborough Stadium, home of Sheffield Wednesday. Staggered platforms, which are double-width compared to the Supertram standard in order to accommodate crowds exiting football matches.
Magna		9 April 2026	TT	Magna Way, Templeborough (Rotherham); 53.4202°N 1.3892°W	MGA (Note: National Rail station code.)	Serves the Magna Science Adventure Centre and also functions as a park and ride site. Staggered platforms. Most recent addition to the Supertram network.
Malin Bridge		23 October 1995	B	Loxley New Road, Malin Bridge; 53.4007°N 1.5082°W	MAB	Single-platform terminus.
Manor Top		5 December 1994	B P	Ridgeway Road, Manor Top; 53.3597°N 1.4286°W	MTE (Note: Code derived from the stop's original name, "Manor Top Elm Tree".)	Serves the Manor Top shopping precinct. A small bus station with connections to local bus services is located behind the outbound platform. Opened as "Manor Top Elm Tree" and renamed when the nearby Elm Tree pub was demolished in 2016.
Meadowhall Interchange		21 March 1994	Y	Meadowhall Road, Meadowhall; 53.4168°N 1.4135°W	MEI	Terminus, consisting of two platforms in an island layout, although one is rarely used. Serves Meadowhall Shopping Centre. Integrated with the adjacent bus and railway stations, with connections to local and national bus services and National Rail services.
Middlewood Park and Ride		23 October 1995	Y	Middlewood Road, Middlewood; 53.4158°N 1.5100°W	MID	Terminus, consisting of two platforms in sequence, although one is rarely used. Large park and ride car park behind the platform.
Moss Way for Peaks College		27 March 1995	B	Moss Way, Owlthorpe; 53.3421°N 1.3626°W	MOW	Serves The Sheffield College (Peaks Campus).
Netherthorpe Road		23 October 1995	B Y	Netherthorpe Road, Netherthorpe; 53.3847°N 1.4824°W	NER	Serves The Ponderosa. Uniquely consists of two platforms in an island layout accessed via a central subway due to capacity constraints, as the tram stop is situated in the central reservation of a dual carriageway.
Nunnery Square Park and Ride		5 November 1998	Y TT	Woodbourn Road, Wybourn; 53.3855°N 1.4417°W	NCS (Note: Code derived from the stop's original name, "Nunnery Crew Stop".)	Located next to Nunnery Square tram depot. Constructed in 1994 as a staff-only halt known as "Nunnery Crew Stop", the halt was subsequently upgraded and opened to the public with the construction of an adjacent park and ride site off the Sheffield Parkway.
Park Grange Croft		1 December 2001	B P	Park Grange Road, Norfolk Park; 53.3701°N 1.4585°W	PAK	Serves The Sheffield College - Advanced Technology Centre and Bramall Lane Stadium, home to Sheffield United.
Park Grange Road		22 August 1994	B P	Park Grange Road, Norfolk Park; 53.3671°N 1.4549°W	PAG	Staggered platforms. Opened as "Park Grange" and renamed when Park Grange Croft opened in 2001.
Parkgate		25 October 2018	TT	Stonerow Way, Parkgate (Rotherham); 53.4429°N 1.3434°W	PAQ	Single-platform terminus. Serves Parkgate Shopping Park and functions as a park and ride site.
Rotherham Central		25 October 2018	TT	Central Road, Rotherham; 53.4310°N 1.3615°W	RMC	Serves Rotherham town centre. Integrated with the railway station for connections to local National Rail services, with connections to local bus services available from nearby Rotherham Interchange.
Shalesmoor for Kelham Island		27 February 1995	B Y	Penistone Road, Kelham Island; 53.3887°N 1.4779°W	SHA	Serves the Kelham Island and Neepsend leisure districts, including Kelham Island Museum and Yellow Arch Studios.
Sheffield Station Sheffield Hallam University		22 August 1994	B P	Granville Street, City Centre; 53.3778°N 1.4612°W	SHS	Integrated with the railway station for connections to local and national National Rail services, and also serves the Park Hill development and Sheffield Hallam University (City Campus). Main stop resited 150 m (490 ft) south in 2002 as part of the redevelopment of the railway station. The original three northern platforms remain in situ and are rarely used in times of service disruption.
Spring Lane		22 August 1994	B P	Park Grange Road, Arbourthorne; 53.3662°N 1.4387°W	SPL	
Tinsley Meadowhall South		21 March 1994	Y TT	Meadowhall Way, Tinsley; 53.4142°N 1.4050°W	TIN	Serves the south side of Meadowhall Shopping Centre.
University of Sheffield for West End Hospitals		27 February 1995	B Y	Upper Hanover Street, City Centre; 53.3807°N 1.4840°W	UOS	Serves the Royal Hallamshire Hospital, Sheffield Children's Hospital, the University of Sheffield and Weston Park (including Weston Park Hospital and Weston Park Museum).
Valley Centertainment		5 November 1998	Y TT	Broughton Lane, Carbrook; 53.4022°N 1.4126°W	VAE	Constructed as part of the Valley Centertainment leisure park development, opening on the same day as the anchor Cineworld cinema. As well as serving the leisure park, this stop functions as a park and ride site, with dedicated car parking behind the cinema.
Waterthorpe		27 March 1995	B	Eckington Way, Waterthorpe; 53.3364°N 1.3450°W	WAT	Serves Westfield School, and is the closest tram stop to Rother Valley Country Park. The city-bound platform is double-faced, with the side opposite the tram line functioning as a bus stop.
West Street		27 February 1995	B Y	West Street, City Centre; 53.3805°N 1.4773°W	WES	Serves the bars and pubs of Division Street and West Street as well as Devonshire Green.
Westfield		27 March 1995	B	Eckington Way, Westfield; 53.3317°N 1.3438°W	WED	
White Lane		27 March 1995	B	White Lane, Charnock; 53.3430°N 1.4197°W	WHL	
Woodbourn Road		21 March 1994	Y TT	Woodbourn Road, Attercliffe; 53.3888°N 1.4345°W	WOR	
