= Manor Operatic Society =

The Manor Operatic Society is an amateur operatic society based in Sheffield, England.

The society was formed in the 1950s on Sheffield's Manor estate. It produces the biggest amateur pantomime in England, presented at Sheffield City Hall each year. The society presented its first pantomime in 1970 and has produced a new show every year since then. The shows used to be staged at the Montgomery Theatre but in 1986 the venue was moved to the Sheffield City Hall to cope with demand.

The pantomime attracts a total audience of up to 25,000 each year.

== Principal cast (2017) ==
- Emma Holmes
- James Smith
- Isabelle Sykes
- Jack Skelton
- Simon Hance
- Digory Holmes
- Holly Parker-Strawson
- Robert Spink
- Chris Hanlon
- Ewan Revill
- Tom Walker
- Harry Lynch-Bowers
- Emily Mae Hoyland
- Andy Finnerty
- Liam Gordon
- Fern Strawson
- Paul Hill
- Lee Stott
- Emily McGeoch
- Richard Coddington
- Emily Siddall
- Lauren Lomas
- Grace Stoddart
- Holly Mae Norris
- Hollie Marsden
- Rachael Walkden
- Rhianna Cutworth
- Evie May Braford (<16 cast member)
- Benji Povey (<16 cast member)

The principal cast are joined on stage by an ensemble and members of a dance school (Ellie Bailey, Rachael Hackett, Alice Mee and Autumn Wade).

== Montgomery Theatre productions (1966 to 1986) ==
- 1966 – Maid of the Mountains (Musical)
- 1967 – The Merry Widow (Musical)
- 1968 – Summer Song (Musical)
- 1969 – Quaker Girl (Musical)
- 1970 – Magyar Melody (Musical)

1971 - Aladdin (Pantomime)

1971 - Finians Rainbow (Musical)

1973 - The Sound of Music (Musical)

1974 - Oklahoma (Musical)

1975 - Jack and the Beanstalk (Pantomime)

1975 - A Funny Thing (Musical)

1976 - Jorrocks (Musical)

1977 - Mother Goose (Pantomime)

1977 - Chrysanthemum (Musical)

1978 - Humpty Dumpty (Pantomime)

1978 - Good Companions (Musical)

1979 - Cinderella (Pantomime)

1979 - CanCan (Musical)

1980 - Queen of Hearts (Pantomime)

1980 - Follow the Star (Musical)

1981 - Goody Two Shoes (Pantomime)

1981 - Make Me an Offer (Musical)

1982 - Aladdin (Pantomime)

1982 - Godspell (Musical)

1983 - Sleeping Beauty (Pantomime)

1983 - Most Happy Fella (Musical)

1984 - Red Riding Hood (Pantomime)

1984 - A Funny Thing (Musical)

1985 - Robinson Crusoe (Pantomime)

1985 - Pippin (Musical)

1986 – Jack and the Beanstalk (pantomime)

1986 – Andy Capp (musical)

== Sheffield City Hall productions (1987 to present) ==
- 2008/09 - Jack and the Beanstalk
- 2009 - Godspell
- 2009/10 - Cinderella
- 2010 - Annie
- 2010/11 - Sleeping Beauty
- 2011 - Carousel
- 2011/12 - Dick Whittington
- 2012 - The Wizard of Oz: The Musical
- 2012/13 - Aladdin
- 2013 - Beauty and the Beast
- 2013/14 - Snow White and the Seven Dwarves
- 2014 - Me and My Girl
- 2014/15 - Peter Pan
- 2015 - Ghost: The Musical
- 2015/16 - Cinderella
- 2016 - Barnum
- 2016/17 - Jack and The Beanstalk
- 2017 - Singin' in the Rain: The Musical
- 2017/18 - Sleeping Beauty
