= Valley Centertainment =

Leisure and entertainment complex in Sheffield, England

Coordinates: 53.40204°N 1.41430°W

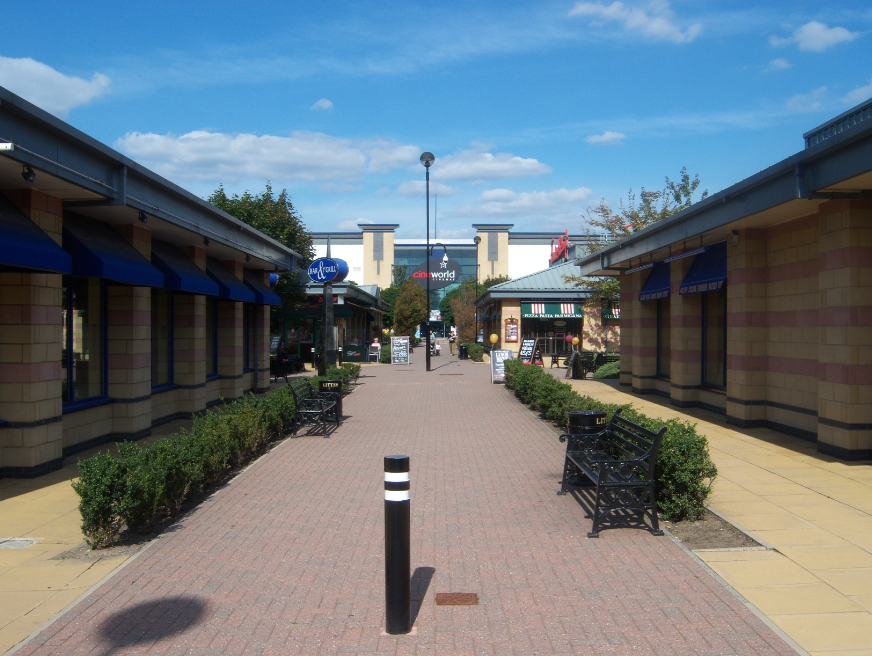

Valley Centertainment is a leisure and entertainment complex in the Don Valley in Sheffield, South Yorkshire, England. It was built on land previously occupied by steel mills which also includes what is now Meadowhall shopping centre and the Utilita Arena. It is home to several restaurants, bars, a cinema, and a bowling alley as well as other attractions.

== Attractions ==
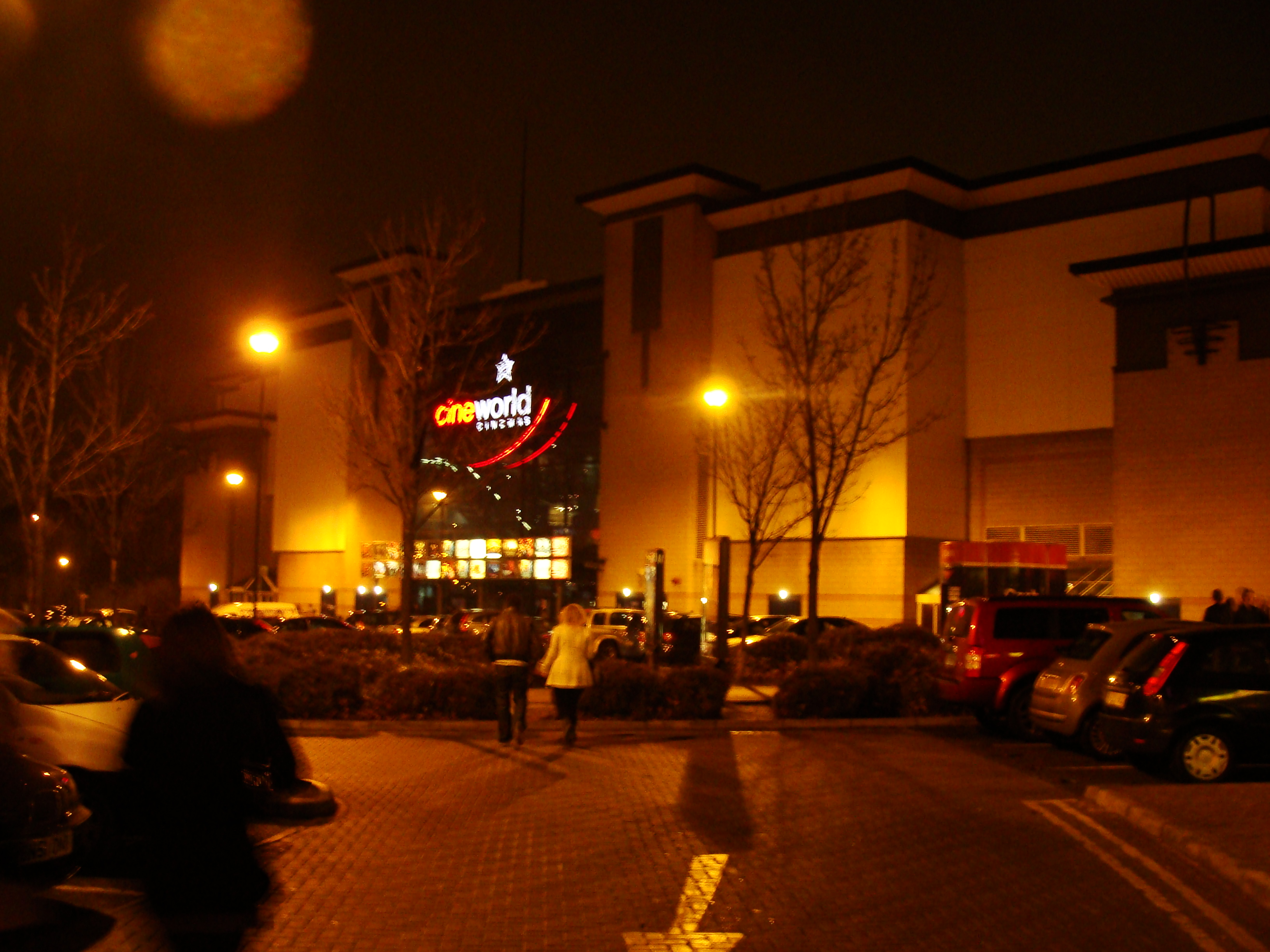
The Cineworld cinema at Centertainment - the largest Cineworld in the country

=== Cinema ===
The Cineworld cinema is one of the busiest in the UK, with 1.8 million visits a year and has more screens than any other Cineworld multiplex with twenty screens in all. It is also one of the first cinemas to introduce digital screens and introduced an IMAX screen in 2012. As of 2021, the cinema also contains a 4DX screen and Screen X, as well as a Starbucks inside the venue.

Opening on 5 November 1998 as a Virgin Megaplex, it later re-branded in October 1999 to UGC before becoming Cineworld in 2005.

=== Bowling ===
The complex features a Hollywood Bowl bowling alley, which has twenty eight lanes open until midnight every night. It also contains a bar, cafe and arcade.

=== Other attractions ===
Valley Centertainment is also home to an indoor Laser Quest, Laser Quest Sheffield. Consisting of two floors of arena space for the children to explore. Painted brilliantly to look as though the children are in outer space. Paradise Island Adventure Golf opened at the park in February 2012 featuring a large indoor mini adventure golf with 2 different courses. An indoor family entertainment centre called 'Monkey Bizness' opened in 2009, the largest of its kind in the country.

== Restaurants ==
Valley Centertainment has established itself as a popular destination for meals as it contains several restaurants, which at peak times can become very busy. These are:

- Burger King
- Frankie & Benny's
- Five Guys
- Unit Sheffield
- Nando's
- Bella Italia
- Wagamama
- Proove Pizza
- Starbucks
- Subway
- Pizza Express
- 39 Desserts
- Miller & Carter Steakhouse

== Public transport ==
Valley Centertainment is well served by public transport. Opened in 1998, Valley Centertainment tram stop is located on the South Yorkshire Supertram's Yellow and Tram-train routes serving Sheffield City Centre, Meadowhall Interchange, and the nearby town of Rotherham.

It is within easy bus access of both Sheffield and Rotherham city centre.

Preceding station	South Yorkshire Supertram	Following station
Carbrook towards Meadowhall Interchange	Yellow Route	Arena towards Middlewood
Carbrook towards Parkgate	Tram-train Route	Arena towards Cathedral

== Road access ==
Valley Centertainment is easily accessible by road:

- From the north - Junction 34 of the M1, and the A6178 or A631.
- From the south or east - Junction 33 of the M1, then using the Sheffield Parkway and following the signs for Sheffield Arena from there.
- From the west/south west - Travelling to Sheffield City Centre and taking the A6109 (Ring Road Junction 10) from the Inner Ring Road. From there it has been well sign posted.

== Parking ==
Valley Centertainment has its own large, free car park. Parking is safe and secure, rewarded by being given its fifth Park Mark Award. Despite ample parking, finding a space can be difficult at peak times. Parking is particularly difficult when there is an event taking place at the neighbouring Sheffield Arena, Sheffield Ice Rink, or when nearby Meadowhall Centre is busy. Valley Centertainment operate a strict policy of fining customers if they park in non standard locations.
