= Carbrook =

Carbrook may refer to:

- Carbrook, Queensland, a suburb of Logan City, Australia
- Carbrook, Sheffield, a district of Sheffield, South Yorkshire, England
- Carbrook Ravine, a nature reserve in Sheffield, South Yorkshire, England

== See also ==
- Carbrooke, a village in Norfolk, England
