= Division Street, Sheffield =

Street in Sheffield, England

Coordinates: 53.379393°N 1.478595°W

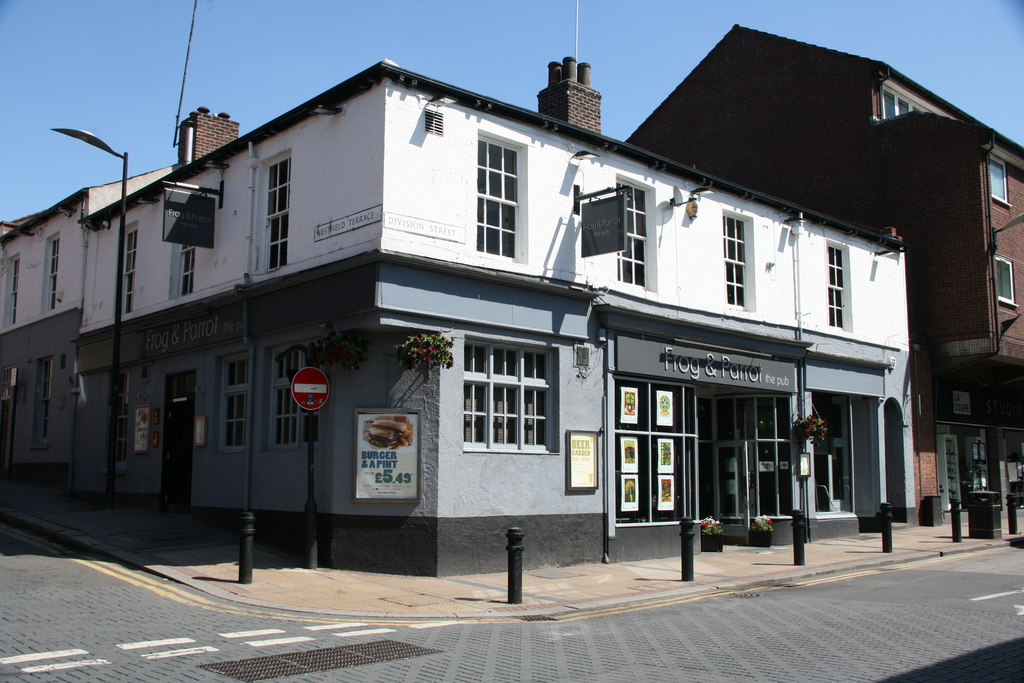
Frog and Parrot, Division Street

Division Street is a pedestrianised street and shopping area located in the Devonshire Quarter of Sheffield, England. It is home to a number of small independent shops, food outlets and pubs, and a few chains including Caffé Nero, Sainsbury's Local, Taco Bell and a Lloyds No. 1 bar. It runs parallel to West Street in the west of the city.

The post box at the end of Division Street near Sheffield City Hall was painted gold in August 2012, to celebrate the Olympic gold medal won by Sheffield's Jessica Ennis.
