= Rotherham Central station =

Railway station and tram-train stop in Rotherham, South Yorkshire, England

Rotherham Central
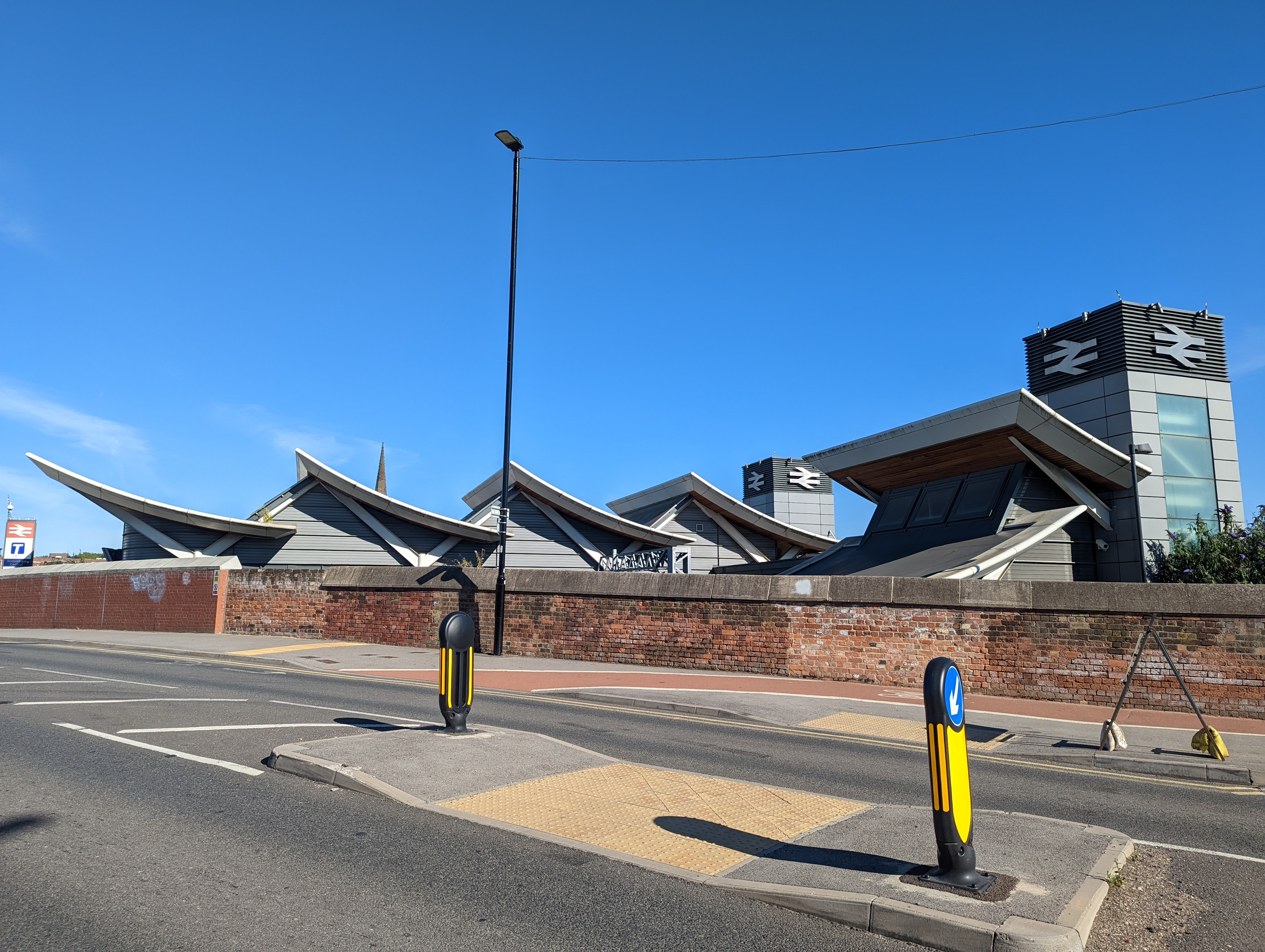
- Rotherham Central in 2022

General information
- Location: Rotherham, Metropolitan Borough of Rotherham; England
- Coordinates: 53.4322°N 1.3605°W
- Grid reference: SK425930
- Managed by: Northern
- Transit authority: Travel South Yorkshire
- Platforms: 4; 2 National Rail; 2 South Yorkshire Supertram

Other information
- Station code: RMC
- Fare zone: Rotherham
- Classification: DfT category E

Key dates
- 1 August 1868: Temporary station opened (terminus of line from Tinsley)
- 3 April 1871: Line to Mexborough opened
- 1 February 1874: Permanent station opened as Rotherham Central
- January 1889: Renamed Rotherham and Masborough
- 25 September 1950: Renamed Rotherham Central
- 5 September 1966: Closed
- 11 May 1987: Re-opened
- 2012: Renovated
- 25 October 2018: Tram-train platforms opened

Passengers
- 2020/21: ▼0.126 million
- Interchange: ▼13
- 2021/22: ▲0.342 million
- Interchange: ▲43
- 2022/23: ▼0.315 million
- Interchange: ▲88
- 2023/24: ▲0.394 million
- Interchange: ▲2,053
- 2024/25: ▲0.463 million
- Interchange: ▲3,179
- Tram routes & stop: TT; Rotherham Central
Location
Notes
- Passenger statistics from the Office of Rail and Road

Rotherham Central railway station is in Rotherham, South Yorkshire, England. The station was originally named "Rotherham", becoming "Rotherham and Masborough" in January 1889 and finally "Rotherham Central" on 25 September 1950.

The station has retained its "Central" suffix, despite being the only railway station in Rotherham since the closure of Rotherham Masborough in 1988.

== History ==
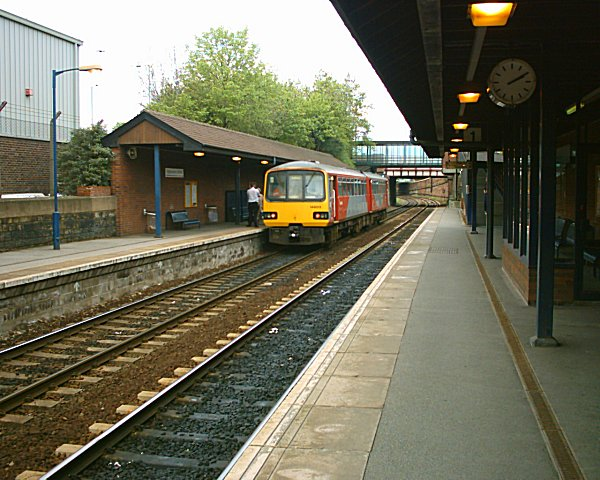
The station in 2004 before renovation

This is the fourth station to be built within the town centre, on the line from Sheffield Victoria. The first, a single platform terminus was built on what became the coal yard by the South Yorkshire Railway (SYR). Today this approximates to the land off Brinsworth Street below the bridge which carries the Inner Relief Road over the railway. The SYR could not gain permission to pass below the already built line of the Sheffield and Rotherham Railway, opened in 1838. A few years later and following amalgamation into the Manchester, Sheffield and Lincolnshire Railway (MS&LR), a scheme was developed to fill the South Yorkshire Navigation, a canal already owned by that railway company, and divert its course into the nearby River Don. As the Navigation already passed below the Sheffield and Rotherham line this would solve the problem, although until recent years the line was prone to flooding. The SYR already had a single line from Mexborough, on its Barnsley to Doncaster line, towards Rotherham, running alongside the canal but only as far as the pottery and brickworks at Kilnhurst, leaving a gap of almost 4 miles (6 km) between. When the through line was completed a new, although temporary Rotherham station was built in the cut with access from the road above named "Amen Corner". This served the town from 1 August 1868. The line between Rotherham and Mexborough opened for goods traffic on 13 March 1871; passenger services began on 3 April 1871 but these continued to use the temporary station until the permanent Rotherham Central station was opened on 1 February 1874. This was an elongated affair with staggered platforms and a large stone main building adjacent to the "Statutes Fair Ground" (now the site of Rotherham's main police station). Originally the access was from Main Street, at the Sheffield end, and College Road, at the Doncaster end. In January 1889 this station was renamed Rotherham and Masborough. This station came under the ownership of the Great Central Railway (GCR) when the MS&LR changed its name in anticipation of its extension to London (Marylebone station) in 1897. The station was served by Sheffield Victoria - Doncaster local trains and others ranging from the north east to the south coast, the Great Central Railway being involved in many operations jointly with other companies. The GCR amalgamated with other railways to form the London and North Eastern Railway (LNER) at the start of 1923; the LNER was itself nationalised at the start of 1948, becoming part of the newly formed British Railways (BR). Following this, Rotherham and Masborough was renamed Rotherham Central on 25 September 1950. Its last main line train, a throw-back to joint operations before the First World War, was the Newcastle to Bournemouth express service. This station was closed on 5 September 1966 and soon demolished.

With the rationalisation of railways in the area in full swing plans to concentrate Sheffield's train services at Sheffield Midland station led to the building of a major new junction between the lines of the former Great Central and the Midland Railway at Aldwarke Junction north of Rotherham, allowing Sheffield - Doncaster trains to be routed onto the Midland line to Sheffield Midland station via Rotherham Masborough. With only one station in town, eventually, "Masborough" was dropped from the name of the remaining station. Rotherham Masborough was located almost half-a-mile away from Rotherham town centre and by the 1980s this was judged to be hindering the use of train services from the town.

== Present station ==
In order to provide a more convenient service, a single line link was constructed from the Midland Line at Holmes Junction, on the Sheffield side of Masborough station, to pass below the Midland line and join the Great Central south of the planned new station. This was known as "The Holmes Chord".

The first sod of earth on the site of the new station was ceremonially cut by the Mayor of Rotherham, Councillor J. L. Skelton on Tuesday, 8 July 1986. He also unveiled a plaque to commemorate the event. On Wednesday, 8 April 1987 the Chairman of the South Yorkshire Passenger Transport Authority, Councillor Jack Meredith ceremonially fixed the last rail clip. The new Rotherham Central station was opened to passengers on 11 May 1987, is situated by the College Road bridge, near the town centre, the Doncaster-bound platform on the site of the 1871 platform but the Sheffield - bound platform is now opposite. The station buildings, of modern brick construction are at road level, with the entrance way through the ticket office; the platforms are approached by ramps. The whole scheme, the station and the Holmes Chord, cost £2,400,000, the P.T.E. funding the scheme with a contribution from Rotherham Metropolitan Borough Council to enhance platform shelter facilities. A grant for half the cost was obtained from the European Regional Development Fund. After just six months, the passenger usage was recorded as being up by 120% compared with the old Masborough station for the same period of 1986.

The official opening date was set for 2 June, however this was postponed due to expected picketing by members of the National Union of Railwaymen demonstrating against the cutting of 11 jobs with the transfer of staff from Masborough and the concerns over the staff reduction on the platform at the new station, this being reduced to one person.

Rotherham Masborough remained for the three per day Sheffield-York trains having regained its suffix, until its closure in 1988, when all services were concentrated on Central station. Clearly, this time the will for rationalising station names had vanished, because the sole remaining Rotherham station still retains its suffix "Central".

=== Redevelopment ===
It was announced by Northern that in 2010 the station would undergo a £8.5 million refurbishment, as part of the "Rotherham Renaissance" plans for the regeneration of the town. The 1980s station buildings and ramps would be replaced by a new travel centre, along with new platform canopies, lifts and CCTV. As part of this the car park would also be redesigned. A temporary station entrance would be constructed for passenger use while the buildings were replaced. Work on the project commenced on Monday, 22 February 2010 with a temporary station entrance being constructed, expected to come into operation during March. The temporary station opened on Friday 9 July and the old travel centre demolished a month later. After being dogged by delays, the new station buildings and platforms opened for public use on Friday 24 February 2012.

=== Tram-train ===
Rotherham Central is also served by the South Yorkshire Supertram tram-train, running two services per hour between Cathedral in Sheffield and Parkgate in Rotherham. The service opened in 2018.

== Planned new station ==
In September 2023 Rotherham Council announced plans to build a new station and tram stop in the Parkgate area.

In February 2025, it was announced this new station would be named 'Rotherham Gateway', and serve regional, mainline and tram services in the Parkgate area of Rotherham, including trains to Leeds and York. It is planned to open in 2031.

== Services ==
=== National Rail ===
Currently, the station has an hourly service on weekdays to Doncaster (most of these extended through to Adwick) and hourly to Wakefield and Leeds, along with two trains per hour to Meadowhall and Sheffield. Three trains per day operate in each direction to York via the Dearne Valley Line.

On Sundays, the station is served by an hourly service to Doncaster, a train every hour to Leeds (previously, it was every 2 hours) and usually two trains per hour to Sheffield. There is no Sunday service to Pontefract Baghill and York.

TransPennine Express operates a very limited service from the station. There is one train per day westbound from Cleethorpes to Manchester and Liverpool in the early morning, Monday to Saturday. There are no eastbound or evening services which call at the station.

The line through Rotherham Masborough railway station survives, and is used by fast passenger services between Sheffield and Leeds/York to bypass Rotherham Central station. Freight services using the "Old Road", the original North Midland Railway line to reach Chesterfield, avoiding Sheffield also traverse this route.

The 2019 United Kingdom floods caused severe disruption to train and tram-train services running through the station, as the station and lines in the area were flooded. The tram-train service, and the Sheffield to Leeds (via Moorthorpe) route were both suspended.

Preceding station	National Rail	Following station
Swinton	Northern Dearne Valley Line	Meadowhall
Swinton	Northern Wakefield Line	Meadowhall
Doncaster	TransPennine Express South TransPennine (limited service)	Meadowhall
	Disused railways	
Tinsley	Eastern Region of British Railways; Sheffield Victoria-Doncaster Line	Rotherham Road

=== South Yorkshire Supertram ===
Rotherham Central
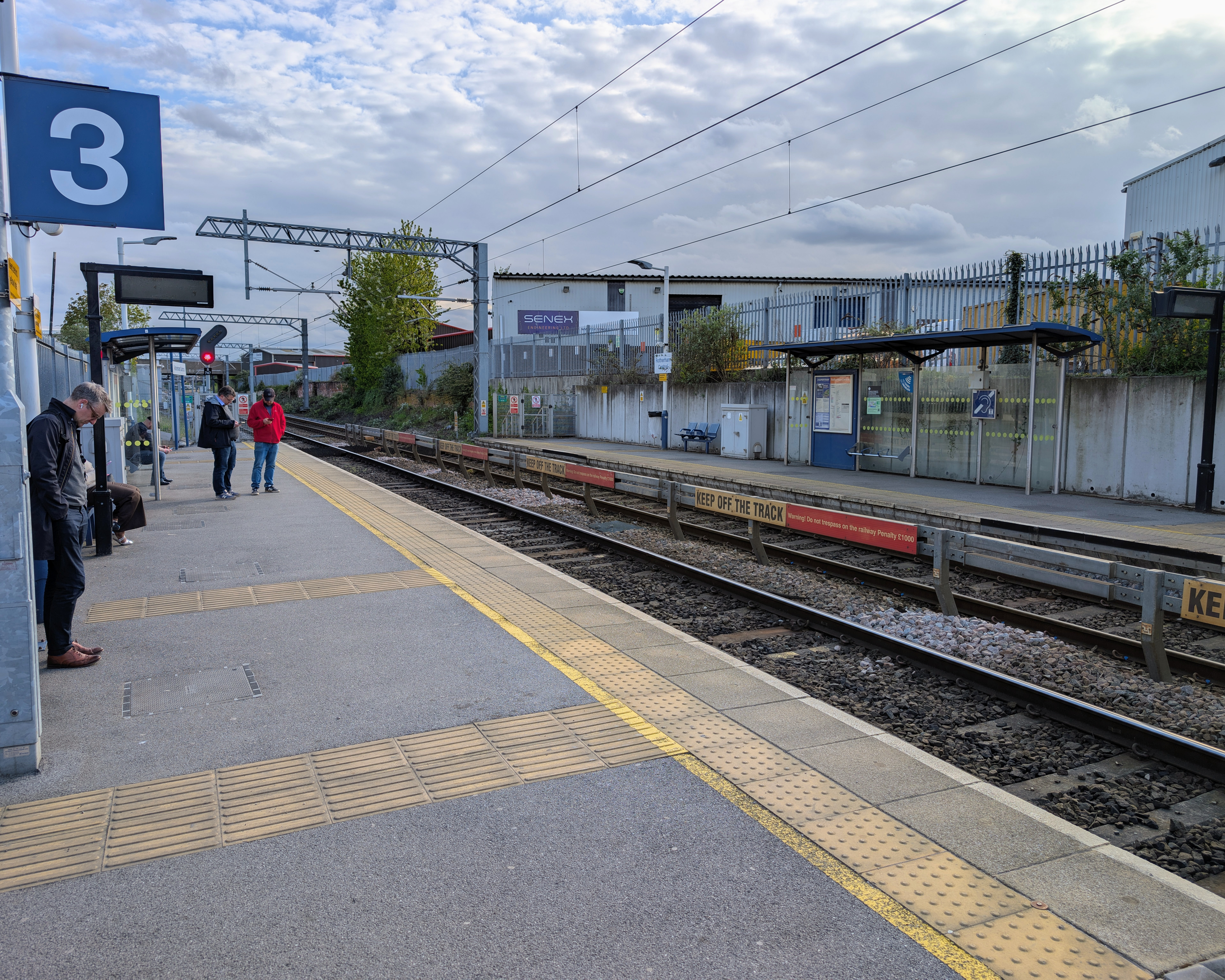
- The tram-train platforms at Rotherham Central in 2026

General information
- Transit authority: South Yorkshire Passenger Transport Executive
- Platforms: 2
- Tram routes: TT

Construction
- Structure type: Below-grade
- Parking: 95 spaces

Other information
- Status: Operational and unstaffed

History
- Opened: 25 October 2018
- Original company: Stagecoach Supertram
Location

Rotherham Central stop opened on the local Supertram network here on 25 October 2018, and currently operates two tram-trains per hour northward to Parkgate and southward to Cathedral in Sheffield city centre. The trams are low-floor, meaning they have to call at their own separate low-level platforms. They are numbered 3 & 4, and located to the south of the station. They are connected to the main National Rail platforms via ramps.

Preceding station	South Yorkshire Supertram	Following station
Magna towards Cathedral	Tram-Train Route	Parkgate towards Rotherham Parkgate
