= Carbrook, Sheffield =

Area of Sheffield, South Yorkshire, England

Coordinates: 53.39°N 1.42°W

Carbrook
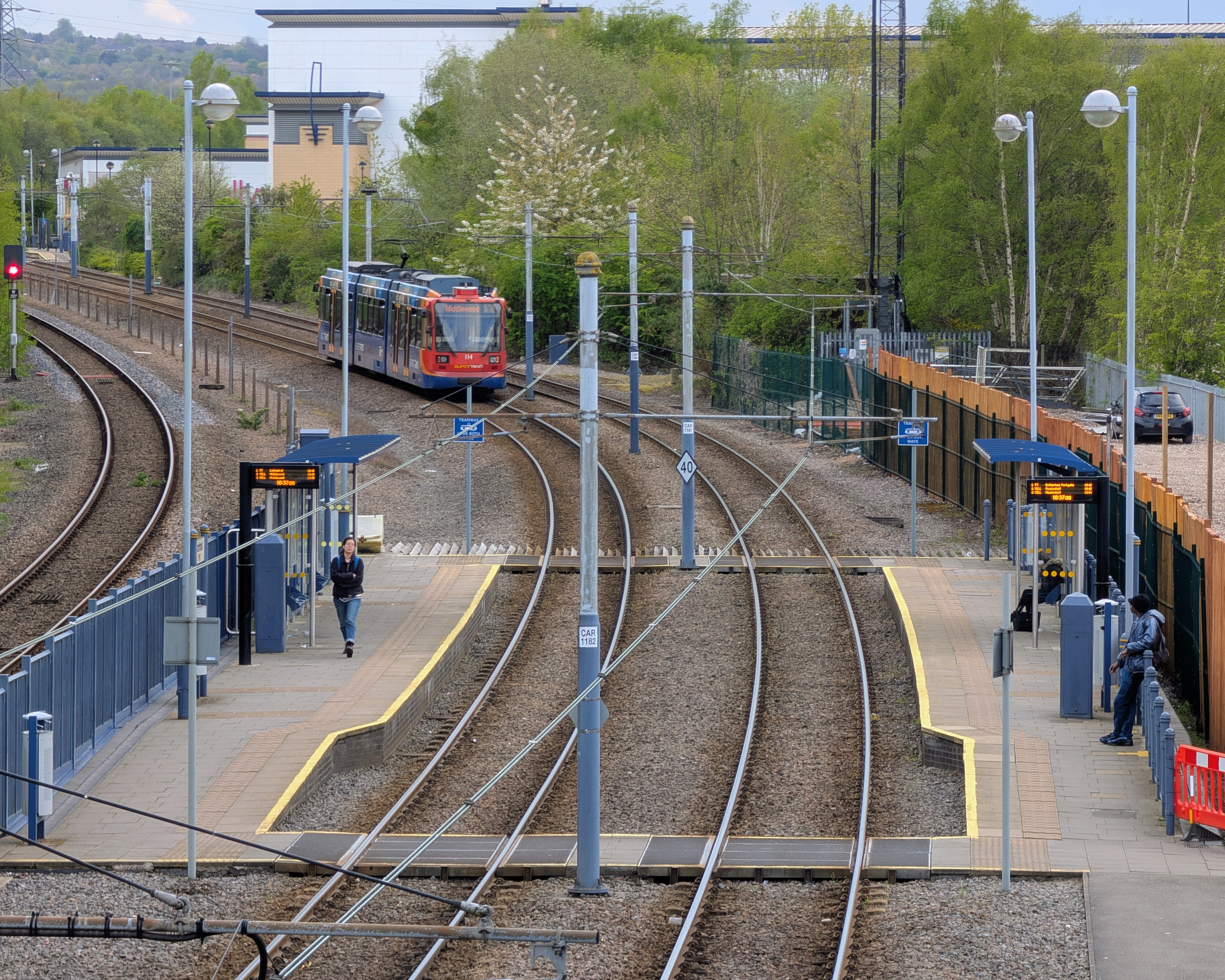
- Carbrook tram stop

- Location within Sheffield
- OS grid reference: SK3889
- Metropolitan borough: City of Sheffield
- Metropolitan county: South Yorkshire
- Region: Yorkshire and the Humber
- Country: England
- Sovereign state: United Kingdom
- Post town: SHEFFIELD
- Postcode district: S9
- Dialling code: 0114
- Police: South Yorkshire
- Fire: South Yorkshire
- Ambulance: Yorkshire
- UK Parliament: Sheffield South East

Carbrook is an industrial area of Sheffield, South Yorkshire, England to the south-east of Brightside. The suburb is named for the Carr Brook, which ran through the area until the late eighteenth century.

Carbrook borders the former industrial village of Tinsley and has preserved a few older buildings such as the South Yorkshire Transport Museum, historic Carbrook Hall (formerly a public house of the same name, now a Starbucks outlet), the stone-built Carbrook School and steelworks Tinsley Wire. In 1868, the Brightside and Carbrook Co-operative Society was founded in the suburb, an important step in the development of the co-operative society in the region, later becoming the Sheffield Co-operative Society.

From the mid-1990s to date, Carbrook has been continually redeveloped with a number of well-known companies attracted to the convenient location within a mile of the M1 motorway at junction 34. These include Abbey National, Freemans Plc and many retail outlets to include prestige marques such as BMW and Lexus. Opened in 1994, Carbrook tram stop is served by the Yellow and Tram-Train routes of the South Yorkshire Supertram. Cabrook contains Meadowhall Retail Park, an out of town retail park not to be confused with Meadowhall Shopping Centre which lies further north.

The main through route 'Attercliffe Road / Sheffield Road' is almost unrecognisable from its pre 1980s design where it offered a mix of old steelworks houses and the last remaining small independent retailers trading from quaint but aged terrace house sized shop fronts. One such shop was known as 'Ronnies barbers', a long established traditional barber who worked well into his 80th year.

Carbrook now boasts a 20-screen cinema, Valley Centertainment, Sheffield Arena and the Olympic Legacy Park.

In September 2017 Sheffield Council announced plans to create a flood alleviation programme on the Carr Brook, and nearby Kirkbridge Dyke.
