= West Street, Sheffield =

Street in Sheffield, South Yorkshire, England

Coordinates: 53.380615°N 1.476159°W

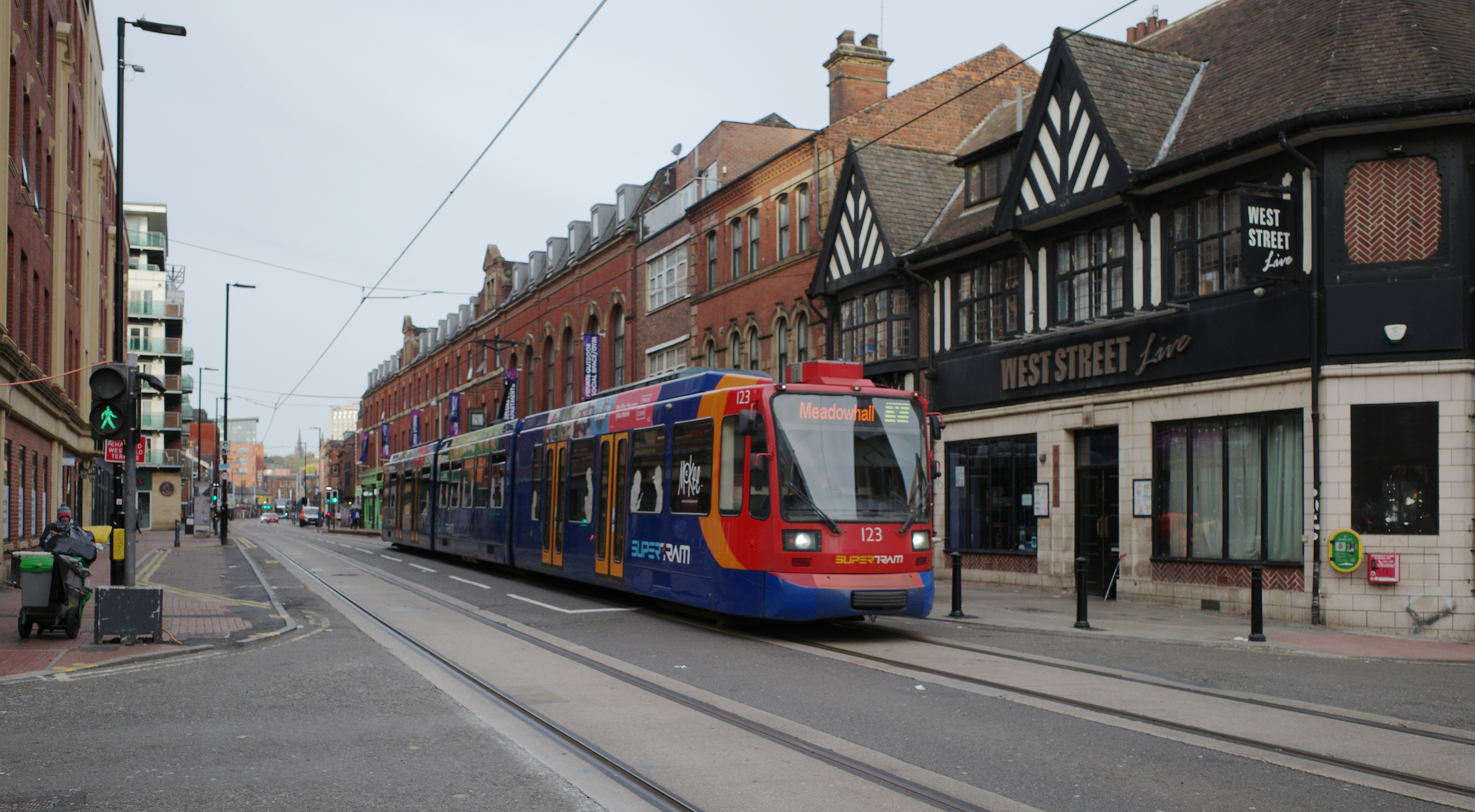
West Street

West Street is a street and shopping area located in the city centre of Sheffield, England. The street is a popular dining and drinking area, with a number of pubs and restaurants. The street is known for its nightlife.

West Street is served by two South Yorkshire Supertram stops, the eponymous West Street tram stop and, due to the close proximity of Sheffield City Hall, the City Hall tram stop.

== Listed buildings ==
- Morton Works (grade-II listed)
- Steel City House (grade-II listed)
- K6 phone kiosks (grade-II listed)
