= Magna Science Adventure Centre =

Educational visitor attraction in Rotherham, South Yorkshire, England

Magna
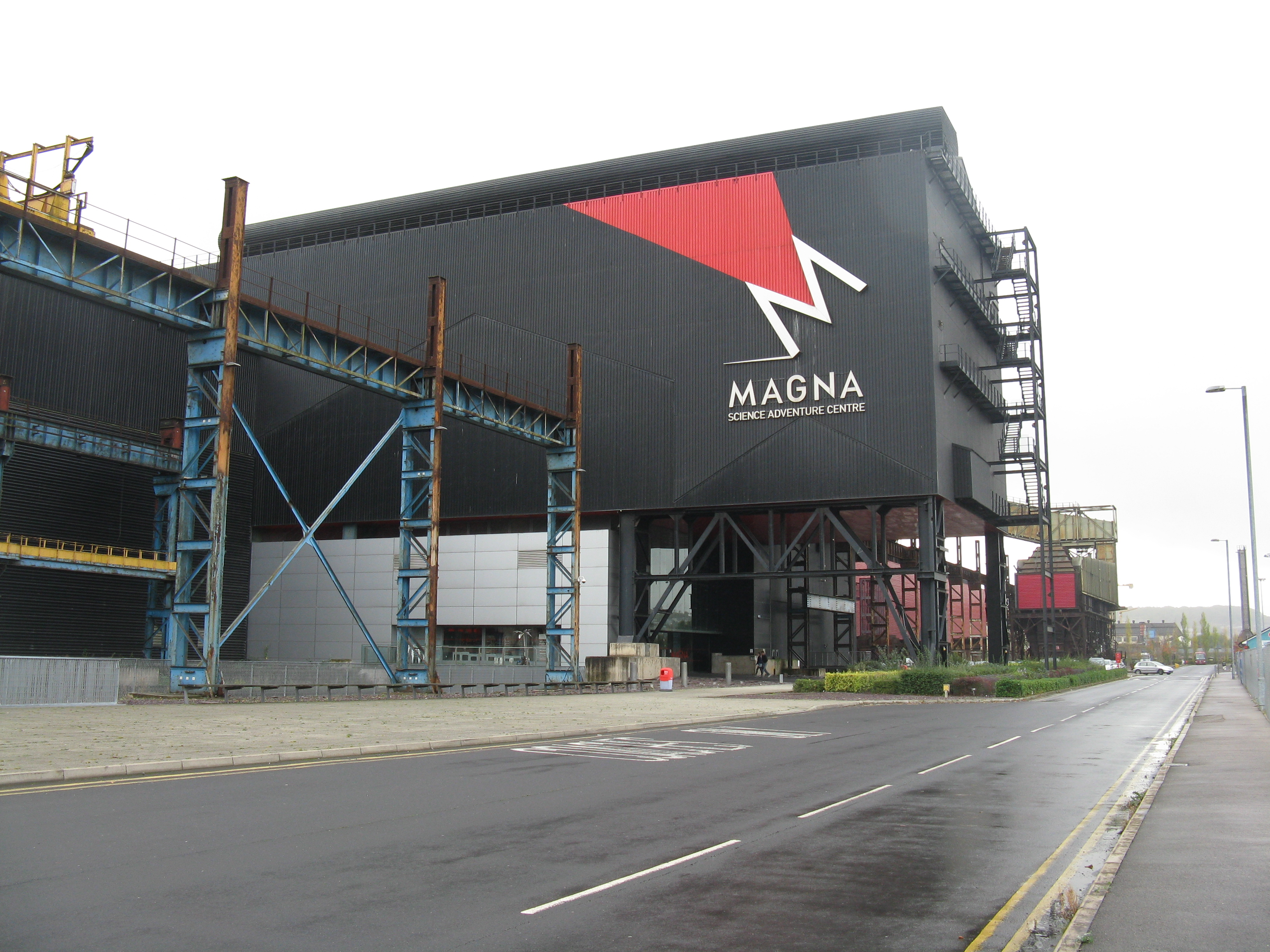
- Exterior shot of Magna
- Interactive map of Magna
- Full name: Magna Science Adventure Centre
- Former names: Templeborough Steelworks (1917–1993)
- Address: Magna, Sheffield Road, Rotherham, S60 1DX, England
- Coordinates: 53°25′09″N 1°23′13″W
- Owner: Magna Trust
- Operator: Magna Trust
- Public transit: TT Magna

Construction
- Renovated: April 2001
- Architect: WilkinsonEyre

Website
- visitmagna.co.uk

Magna Science Adventure Centre is an educational visitor attraction set in a former steel mill, located in Rotherham, South Yorkshire.

== Location ==
The site used to be home to the Steel, Peech and Tozer steelworks (also known as Steelos). In 50 AD it was the site of the Templeborough Roman fort. It is located next to the Dearne Valley line railway and is served by Magna station on the South Yorkshire Supertram network which opened on 9 April 2026.

The principal exhibits are divided into four pavilions: Earth, Air, Fire, and Water. There is also an outdoor Sci-Tek play area, and Aqua-Tek water play area.

The 1/3 mile long site is often used for staging events, conferences and performances. It won the Enjoy England Gold Award for Business Tourism in 2006.

== Development ==
The development, funding and building process was led by Stephen Feber, who selected the design team, led by architects WilkinsonEyre and exhibition designers Event Communications. Tim Caulton directed exhibition development. Magna's exhibitions won the Best Exhibition category at the 2002 Design Week Awards. The Centre won the 2001 RIBA Stirling Prize for its architects Wilkinson Eyre Architects, Mott MacDonald and Buro Happold's use of space in the old steelworks.

== The Big Melt ==
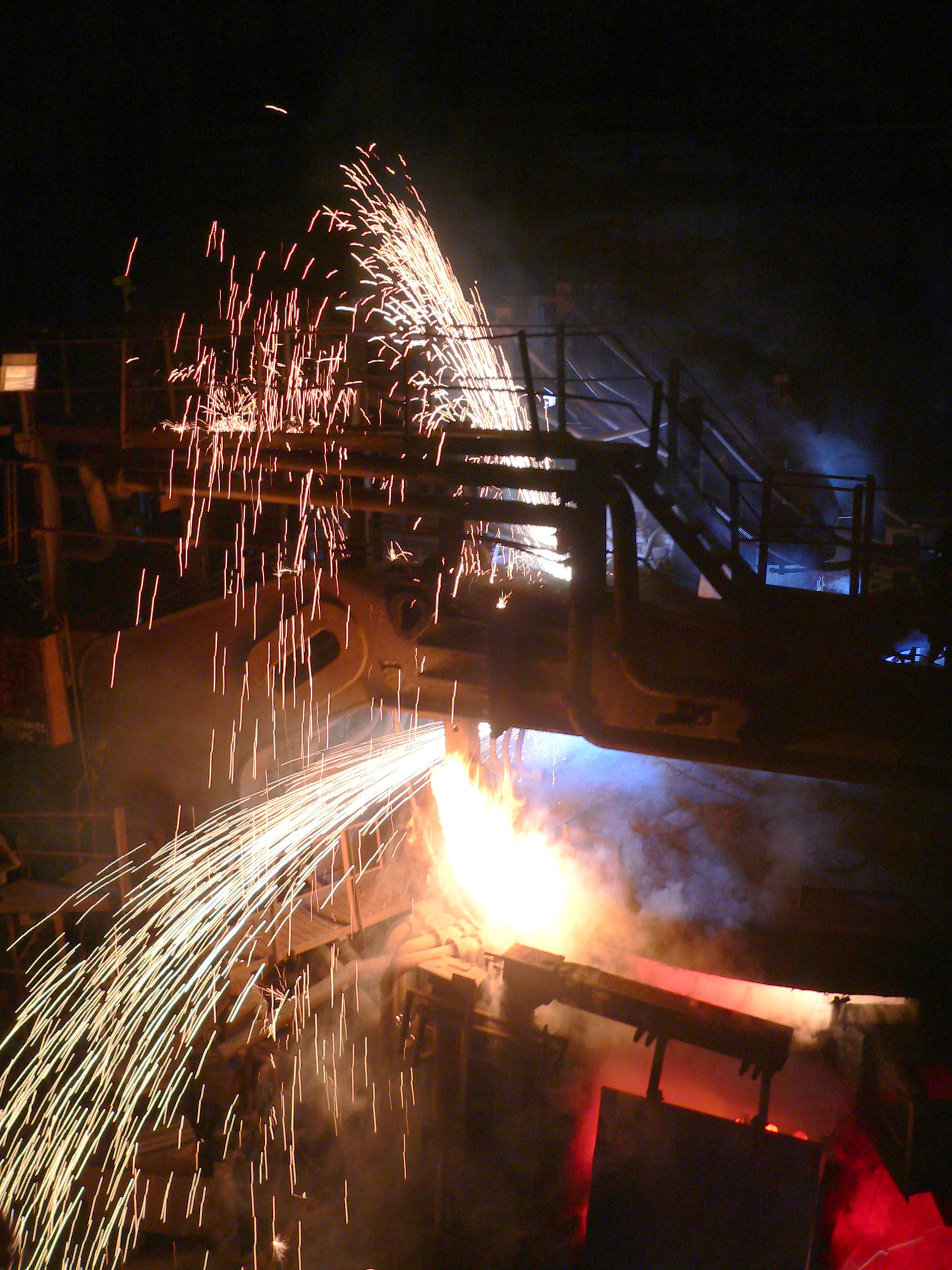
The Big Melt 's new steel arc Furnace

Every hour, Magna holds a display called "The Big Melt". Its purpose is to demonstrate how steel was made in an electric arc furnace until the steelworks closed in 1993. A furnace is imitated with fog, spark, flame and smoke machines, loudspeakers, lights, and blasts of rapidly burning propane which are ignited at appropriate points in the show. The show can be repeated up to four times an hour, but, in practice, it is usually run once an hour or twice an hour if visitor numbers are very high.

== Real Ale Festival ==
Since 2011, the centre has been home to the annual Rotherham Real Ale and Music Festival. The festival was previously held at Oakwood Technology College. Money raised from the festival is donated to local charities. In 2025 CAMRA's Great British Beer Festival Winter was held here.

== See also ==
- List of science centers#Europe
