= Meadowhall Interchange =

Transport interchange in South Yorkshire, England

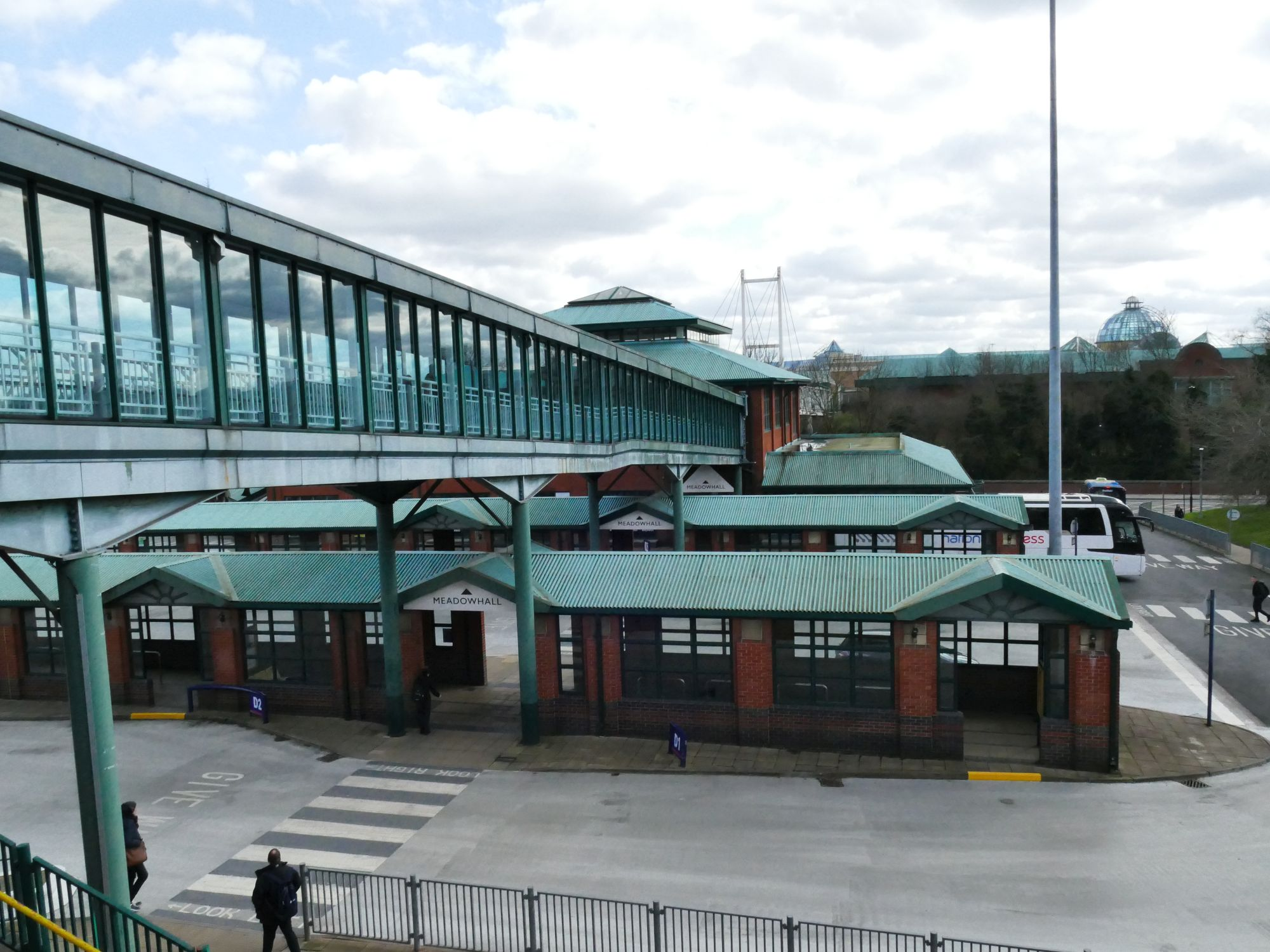

General information
- Location: Sheffield, City of Sheffield, England
- Coordinates: 53.4167°N 1.4141°W
- Grid reference: SK390912
- Manager: Northern Trains
- Transit authority: Travel South Yorkshire
- Platforms: 4 (National Rail), 2 (Supertram), 16 (Bus and coach station)

Other information
- Station code: MHS
- Fare zone: Sheffield and Rotherham
- Classification: DfT category C2

History
- Opened: 4 September 1990; 36 years ago (Bus and heavy rail stations opened); 21 March 1994; 32 years ago Supertram platforms opened
- Original company: British Rail

Passengers
- 2021/22: ▲1.345 million
- Interchange: ▲39,079
- 2022/23: ▲1.453 million
- Interchange: ▼37,097
- 2023/24: ▲1.678 million
- Interchange: ▲37,787
- 2024/25: ▲1.911 million
- Interchange: ▲48,761
- 2025/26: ▲1.986 million
- Interchange: ▲62,252
- Tram routes and stop: Y Meadowhall Interchange
Location
Notes
- Passenger statistics from the Office of Rail and Road

Meadowhall Interchange is a transport interchange located to the north-east of the City of Sheffield, in South Yorkshire, England. It consists of a combined heavy rail station, tram stop, and bus and coach station. The second-busiest heavy rail station in the city in terms of passenger numbers, Meadowhall Interchange provides connections between National Rail services, the South Yorkshire Supertram light rail network, inter-city coach services and the city bus network.

The interchange was opened in 1990 by British Rail, within the Regional Railways sector, to serve the new Meadowhall shopping centre, which opened at the same time and is connected to the interchange by a pedestrian footbridge. The interchange is now owned by Network Rail and operated by Northern Trains, with additional services provided by TransPennine Express.

== History ==
=== Previous stations ===
The first station to be named after the Meadowhall area, Meadowhall and Wincobank, was opened in 1868 by the South Yorkshire Railway on the Blackburn Valley Line from Sheffield Victoria to Barnsley. Meadowhall and Wincobank closed in 1953; the track was eventually lifted and converted into a rail trail in 1987, although the station building survives in good condition.

Upon opening in 1990, Meadowhall Interchange effectively replaced the station at Brightside, located around 1 mile (1.6 km) further down the line towards Sheffield. However, limited services continued to serve Brightside for several years after the opening of Meadowhall Interchange, with Brightside station finally closing in 1995.

	Historical railways	
Brightside; Line open, station closed	Regional Railways	Rotherham Central; Line and station open

=== Construction and opening ===
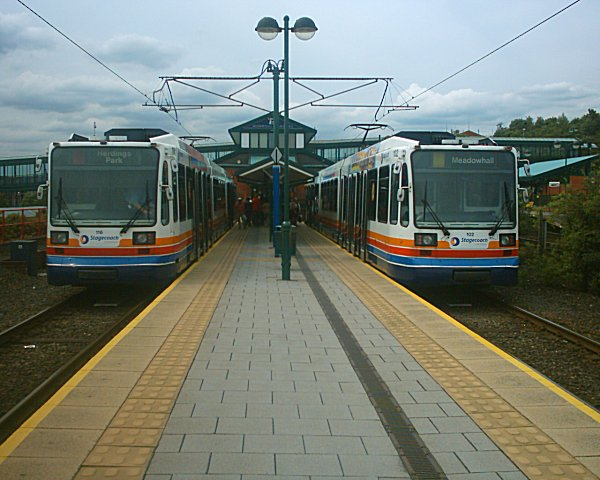
The Supertram platforms in 2004

In 1989, the South Yorkshire Passenger Transport Executive received a European Regional Development Fund grant for 50% of the cost of building the interchange.

It was constructed to serve the new Meadowhall shopping centre, which opened on 4 September 1990 on the former site of steelworks, in the Don Valley of north-east Sheffield. The interchange was constructed to the north of the shopping centre on the opposite bank of the river Don, with a pedestrian suspension bridge linking the interchange with the shopping centre. The heavy rail, and bus and coach stations opened in 1990.

The South Yorkshire Supertram light rail platforms opened on 21 March 1994. The section of line from Meadowhall to Fitzalan Square, in the city centre, was the first phase of the network to open.

=== Dropped HS2 plans ===
Meadowhall Interchange was selected as the initial site for Sheffield's High Speed 2 station, with a high-level viaduct station planned to be constructed parallel to the M1 motorway's Tinsley Viaduct adjacent to the main line station. However, these plans were eventually dropped, with plans for High Speed 2 services to instead serve Sheffield station in the city centre.

As part of the plans, proposals were put forward for the construction of a new Supertram line from Meadowhall Interchange to Dore & Totley in the south-west of the city.

== Facilities ==
There are no ticket barriers at the interchange. In addition to the ticket office, several ticket machines are located in the open-air concourse between platforms 2 and 3. The main waiting room, with toilet and baby changing facilities, is located at the end of the light rail platforms, opening onto platform 1, with an additional waiting room provided on platform 2.

A park and ride car park, with 307 spaces, is located behind platform 2; there are additional parking facilities available around the shopping centre.

A second concourse is located next to the bus and coach station; it contains toilets, ticket purchasing facilities and several small shopping outlets.

== Layout ==
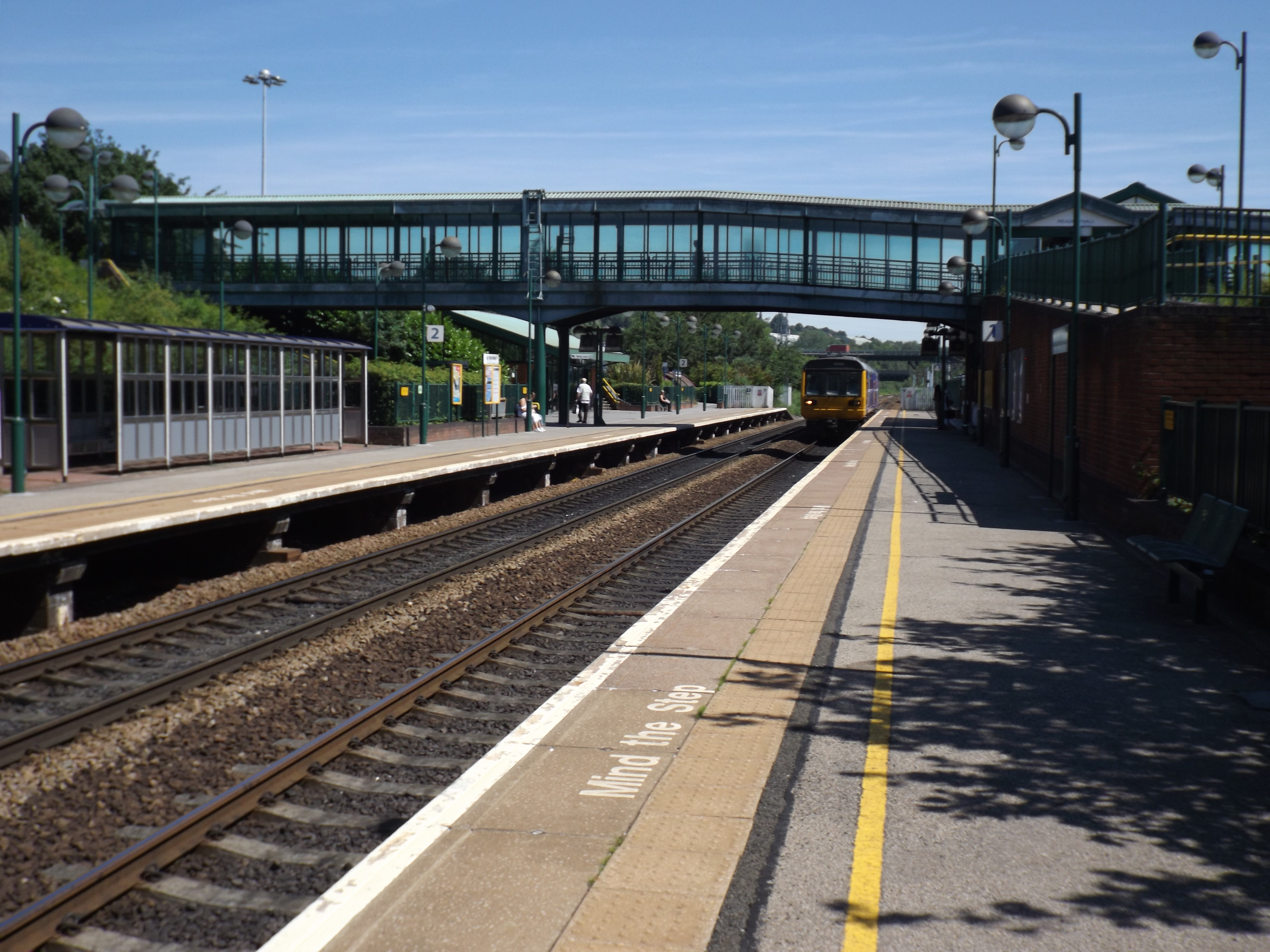
Platforms 1 and 2

The interchange is located to the north of Meadowhall shopping centre, to which it is connected by a pedestrian footbridge, which provides the main entrance to the interchange. Additionally, entrances are located from Meadowhall Road into the bus station, on Barrow Road from the park and ride car park onto the heavy rail platforms, and from Tyler Street directly from street level onto the main concourse.

The ticket office for National Rail services is located off to the side of the footbridge which connects the interchange with the shopping centre. This footbridge continues over platforms 1 and 2, opening up onto a raised open-air concourse area from which platforms 2 and 3 can be accessed. A further footbridge from this central concourse provides access to platform 4 and the Tyler Street interchange entrance; platform 1 and the Supertram platforms are accessed directly by steps down from the main footbridge, opposite the ticket office.

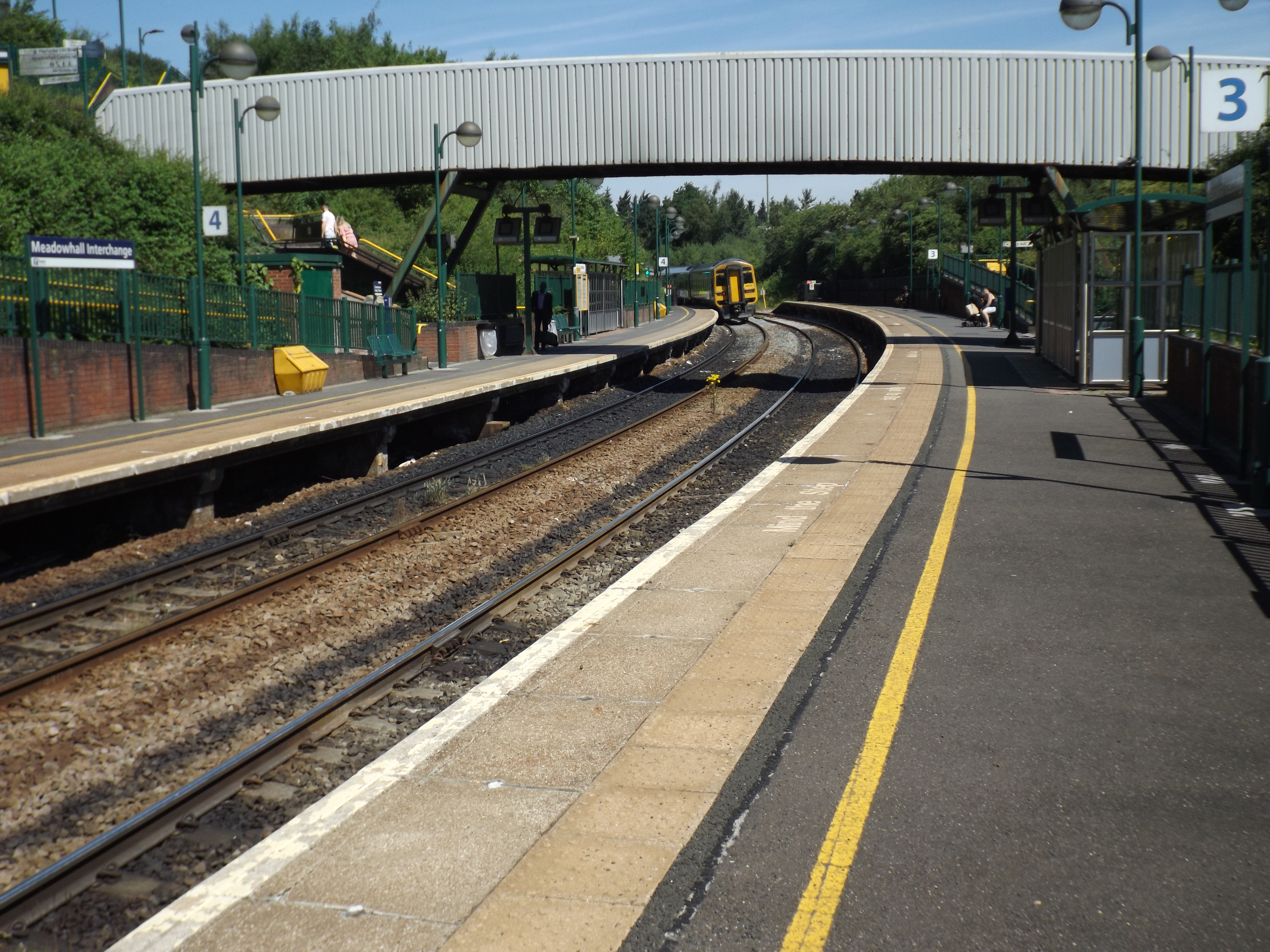
Platforms 3 and 4

The station is located immediately to the north-east of Station Junction, where the Dearne Valley Line diverges from the Hallam and Penistone Lines:

- Platforms 1 and 2 are a pair of side platforms located closest to the shopping centre on the Dearne Valley Line
- Platforms 3 and 4 are located on the other side of the central open-air concourse on the Hallam and Penistone Lines, laid out at a 45-degree angle to platforms 1 and 2.

The light rail platforms, numbered MEI1 and MEI2, are located immediately behind and parallel to platform 1; they are constructed in an island layout. Since the cessation of off-peak Purple Line services to the interchange, most tram services depart from platform MEI1.

There are a total of 16 stands at the bus and coach station, arranged into four main rows, each accessed by zebra crossings:

- Row A, consisting of stands A1 to A5, is located alongside the bus station concourse
- Row B, consisting of stands B1 and B2, is located as a small island between rows A and C
- Row C, consisting of stands C1 to C5
- Row D, consisting of stands D1 to D4, are a pair of parallel island rows located at the side of the bus station closest to the heavy rail platforms.

The majority of inter-city bus and coach services depart from row A, while city bus services depart from rows B, C and D.

== Services ==
=== National Rail ===
The interchange is served by two train operating companies, which provide the following general off-peak service pattern in trains per hour/day (tph/tpd):

Northern Trains:

- 6 tph to Sheffield only
- 2 tph to Leeds (fast), via Barnsley Interchange and Wakefield Kirkgate
- 1 tph to Doncaster, via Rotherham Central, continuing through to Adwick
- 1 tph to Bridlington and Scarborough, via Doncaster, Goole and Hull Paragon Interchange
- 1 tph to Huddersfield, via Barnsley Interchange and Penistone
- 1 tph to Leeds (slow) via Rotherham Central, Moorthorpe and Wakefield Westgate
- 1 tph to Leeds (slow), via Barnsley Interchange, Wakefield Kirkgate and Castleford
- 1 tph to Lincoln Central, via Sheffield, Worksop, Retford and Gainsborough Lea Road
- 1 tph to Nottingham, via Sheffield, Chesterfield and Alfreton
- 3 tpd to York, via Rotherham Central and Pontefract Baghill.

TransPennine Express:

- 1 tph to Liverpool Lime Street, via Sheffield and Manchester Piccadilly
- 1 tph to Cleethorpes, via Doncaster, Scunthorpe and Grimsby Town.

Preceding station	National Rail	Following station
Sheffield	TransPennine Express South TransPennine	Doncaster
Sheffield	Northern Trains Hallam Line	Barnsley
Sheffield	Northern Trains Hallam Line	Chapeltown
Sheffield	Northern Trains Penistone Line	Chapeltown
Sheffield	Northern Trains Dearne Valley Line	Rotherham Central
Sheffield	Northern Trains Wakefield Line	Rotherham Central
	Future services	
Sheffield	Northern Trains; Leeds–Lincoln	Barnsley

=== South Yorkshire Supertram ===
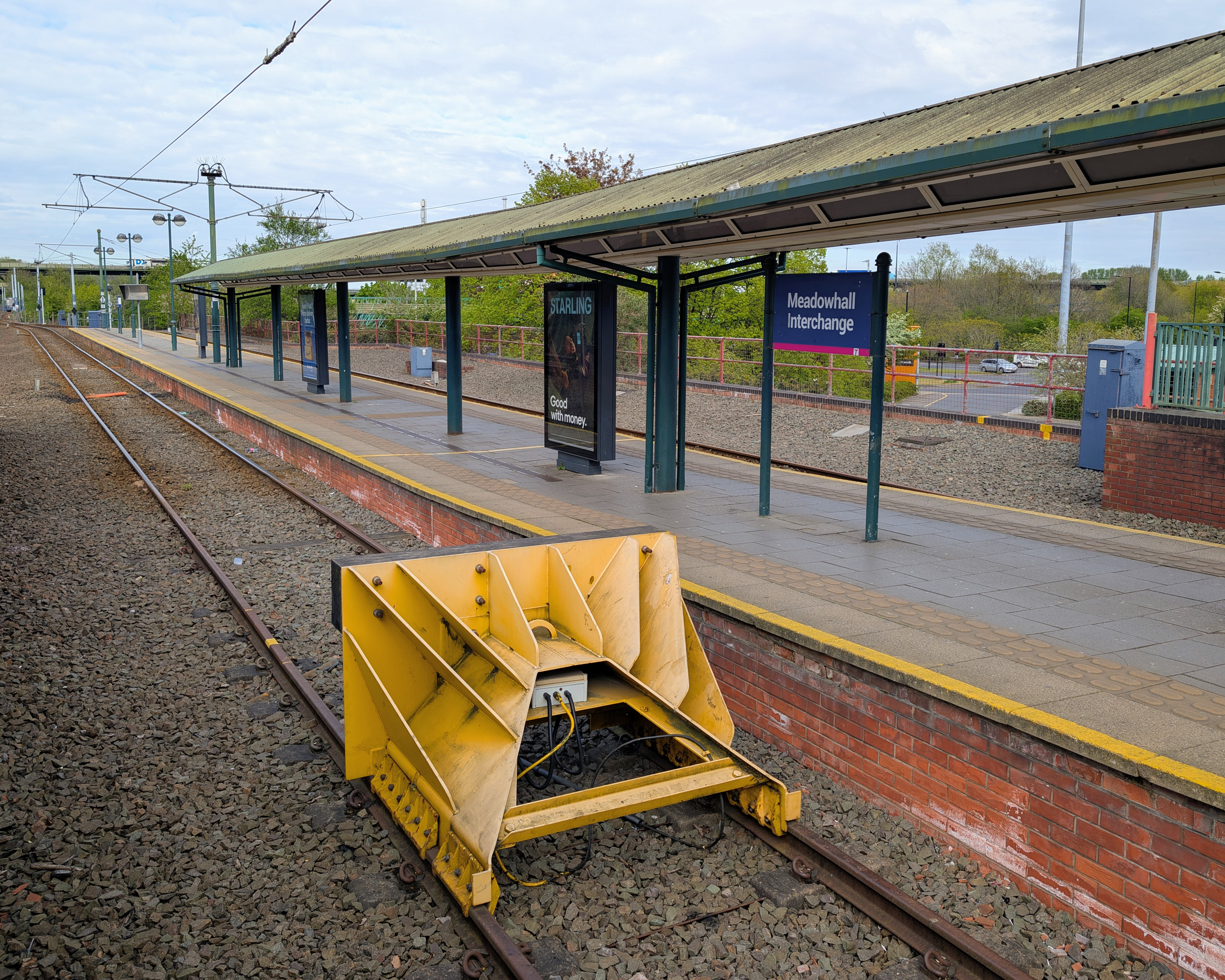
The Supertram platforms in 2026

Meadowhall Interchange is the terminus of the South Yorkshire Supertram's Yellow route. (Note: Until 25 October 2018, additional services were provided by the Purple route on Sundays and, prior to 2016, during off-peak hours of operation during the week and on Saturdays.)

Current off-peak tram services from the interchange consist of five trams per hour to Middlewood, via the city centre. Additional services operate during the morning and evening peak to provide a ten-minute frequency.

Preceding station	South Yorkshire Supertram	Following station
Terminus	Yellow Route	Tinsley Meadowhall South towards Middlewood

=== Buses and coaches ===
Meadowhall Interchange
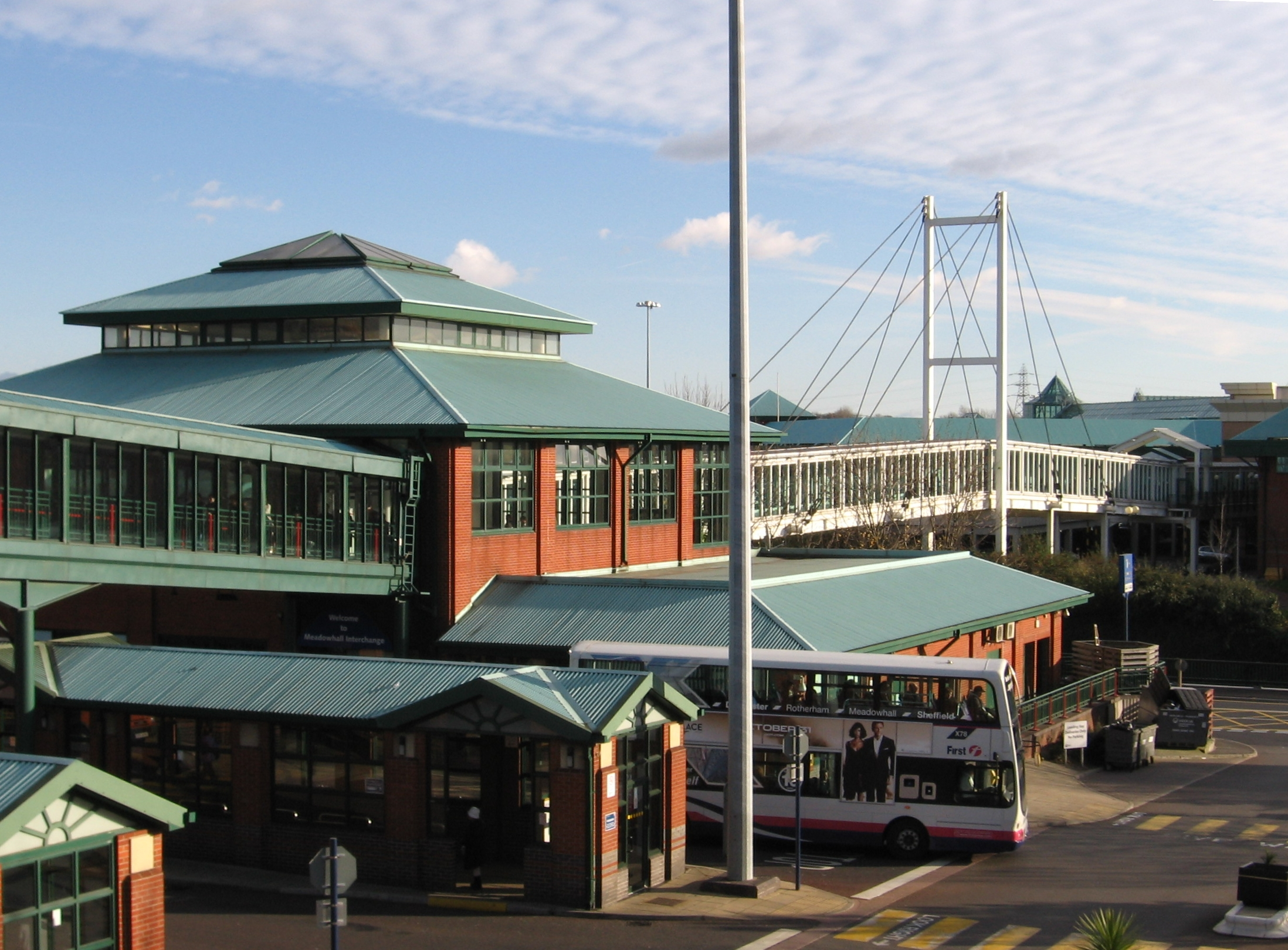

General information
- Location: Meadowhall Road, Meadowhall, City of Sheffield, England
- Owner: Meadowhall Shopping Centre
- Operator: Travel South Yorkshire
- Bus stands: 16
- Bus operators: First South Yorkshire; FlixBus; National Express; Stagecoach Yorkshire; TM Travel

Construction
- Parking: Yes (Note: Free parking is available at the shopping centre.)
- Cycle facilities: Yes
- Accessible: Yes

History
- Opened: 4 September 1990
Location

Meadowhall Interchange is located a short distance from junction 34 of the M1 motorway, meaning it is more conveniently located for inter-city coach services than Sheffield Interchange in the city centre. As a result, many coach services for Sheffield call here instead of the city centre, particularly FlixBus services. To link passengers with Sheffield city centre, there are many bus services to/from Sheffield Interchange, including the X1, X2, X3 and X17.

Inter-city coach services are operated by FlixBus and National Express; destinations include London, Leeds, Manchester, Newcastle, Edinburgh and Glasgow, along with Gatwick and Heathrow Airports. It is also a major hub for local bus services, which are operated by First South Yorkshire and Stagecoach Yorkshire.

As of 2026, the stand allocation is:

Stand	Route	Destination
A1	–	Inter-city (Flixbus)
A2	–	Inter-city (National Express}
A3	X1	Sheffield, via Brightside (First South Yorkshire)
A3	X2	Sheffield, via Brightside (First South Yorkshire)
A4	65	Buxton, via Carbrook, Sheffield, Ecclesall, Fox House, Grindleford, Calver, Baslow, Stoney Middleton, Eyam and Tideswell (Stagecoach Yorkshire)
A4	X3	Sheffield, via Attercliffe (First South Yorkshire)
A4	X17	Wirksworth, via Carbrook, Sheffield, Heeley, Woodseats, Whittington Moor, Chesterfield, Walton, Kelstedge and Matlock (Stagecoach Yorkshire)
A5	–	Taxi rank
B1	–	No services allocated
B2	70	Sheffield, via Tinsley Park, Waverley, Handsworth, Manor Top and Eastern Avenue (TM Travel)
B2	70A	Sheffield, via Tinsley Park, Waverley, Handsworth, Woodhouse, Dyke Vale Road, Manor Top and Eastern Avenue (First South Yorkshire)
C1	X1	Maltby, via Rotherham, Wickersley and Bramley (First South Yorkshire)
C1	X2	Doncaster, via Rotherham, Wickersley, Bramley, Maltby, Braithwell, Edlington and Balby (First South Yorkshire)
C2	X3	Doncaster, via Rotherham, Thrybergh, Conisbrough and Balby (First South Yorkshire)
C3	–	No services allocated
C4	X17	Barnsley, via M1, Birdwell and Worsbrough (Stagecoach Yorkshire)
C5	18	Sheffield, via Darnall, Manor Top, Gleadless Townend, Norton Lees, Woodseats, Heeley and Bramall Lane (First South Yorkshire)
C5	18A	Sheffield, via Darnall, Manor Top, Gleadless Townend, Norton Lane, Woodseats, Heeley and Bramall Lane (First South Yorkshire)
D1	137	Rotherham, via Wincobank, Blackburn, Kimberworth and Masbrough (Stagecoach Yorkshire)
D1	137A	Rotherham, via Blackburn, Richmond, Kimberworth, Holmes and Masbrough (Stagecoach Yorkshire)
D2	18	Hillsborough, via Grimesthorpe, Page Hall, Firth Park, Shiregreen and Shirecliffe (First South Yorkshire)
D2	18A	Hillsborough, via Grimesthorpe, Page Hall, Firth Park, Shiregreen, Sheffield Lane Top, Longley Hall Road and Shirecliffe (First South Yorkshire)
D2	137	Sheffield, via Grimesthorpe and Burngreave (Stagecoach Yorkshire)
D3	76	Lowedges, via Shiregreen, Firth Park, Northern General Hospital, Sheffield, Nether Edge, Woodseats and Greenhill (First South Yorkshire)
D3	76A	Lowedges, via Wincobank, Shiregreen, Firth Park, Northern General Hospital, Sheffield, Nether Edge, Woodseats and Greenhill (First South Yorkshire)
D3	76E	Lowedges, via Wincobank, Sandstone Road, Shiregreen, Firth Park, Northern General Hospital, Sheffield, Nether Edge, Woodseats and Greenhill (First South Yorkshire)
D4	32	Sheffield, via Wincobank, Shiregreen, Firth Park, Northern General Hospital, Parson Cross, Wadsley Bridge, Shirecliffe and Burngreave (TM Travel)
