= Manor, South Yorkshire =

Electoral ward in the City of Sheffield, South Yorkshire, England

Manor Castle
- Shown within Sheffield
- Population: 21,223 (2011 census)
- Metropolitan borough: City of Sheffield
- Metropolitan county: South Yorkshire
- Region: Yorkshire and the Humber
- Country: England
- Sovereign state: United Kingdom
- UK Parliament: Sheffield Heeley
- Councillors: Laura Moynahan (Labour and Co-operative); Ruth Abbey (Green Party); Elle Dodd (Labour and Co-operative)

Manor Castle ward—which includes the districts of Fairleigh, Lower Manor (Castlebeck), Manor Park, Park Hill, Skye Edge, Stafford (Norfolk Park) and Wybourn—is one of the 28 electoral wards of the city of Sheffield, England. It is located in the eastern part of the city and covers an area of 5.4 km^{2} (2.1 sq mi). The population of this ward in 2001 was 21,000 people in 9,700 households, the population increasing to 21,223 at the 2011 Census. It is one of the wards that make up the Sheffield Heeley constituency.

== Districts of Manor Castle ward ==
=== Manor ===
Manor (grid reference SK387862) is a large low-rise housing estate in eastern Sheffield, Yorkshire, England. It is divided into Manor Park, Upper and Lower Manor, and Manor Top.

Until the 1930s, the area was mostly rural, with housing only along the main roads. The estate was started during the 1930s as a garden city type development, to alleviate overcrowding in central Sheffield. However, unlike true garden cities, places of work were not included in the scheme, although nearby Darnall and Attercliffe had some industry.

Manor is named for Sheffield Manor and is adjacent to Manor Park. The area is now served by Manor Top tram stop (opened in 1994) on the Blue and Purple routes of the South Yorkshire Supertram network; a small bus station is located next to the tram stop, serving local routes. Large areas of the estate were demolished, and in some cases rebuilt with private funding, from the late 1990s onwards.

=== Wybourn ===
Wybourn (grid reference SK373871) is a council estate, built in the 1920s, lying north of Manor Park and east of Park Hill. In the north west of the district lies Hyde Park, originally a larger version of Park Hill, but since reduced in scale with the demolition of some blocks and the recladding and alteration of circulation elsewhere.

=== Park Hill ===
Park Hill (grid reference SK364875) is the name of the district in which the Park Hill flats are sited. The name relates to the deer park attached to Sheffield Manor, the remnant of which is now known as Norfolk Park.

== In popular culture ==
The Reverend and the Makers song "Heavyweight Champion of the World" includes the line "At school he used to dream about being Bruce Lee/But the need for chops in Manor Top ain't all that great you see".
