= Parkgate tram-train station =

Tram-train station in South Yorkshire, England

Parkgate
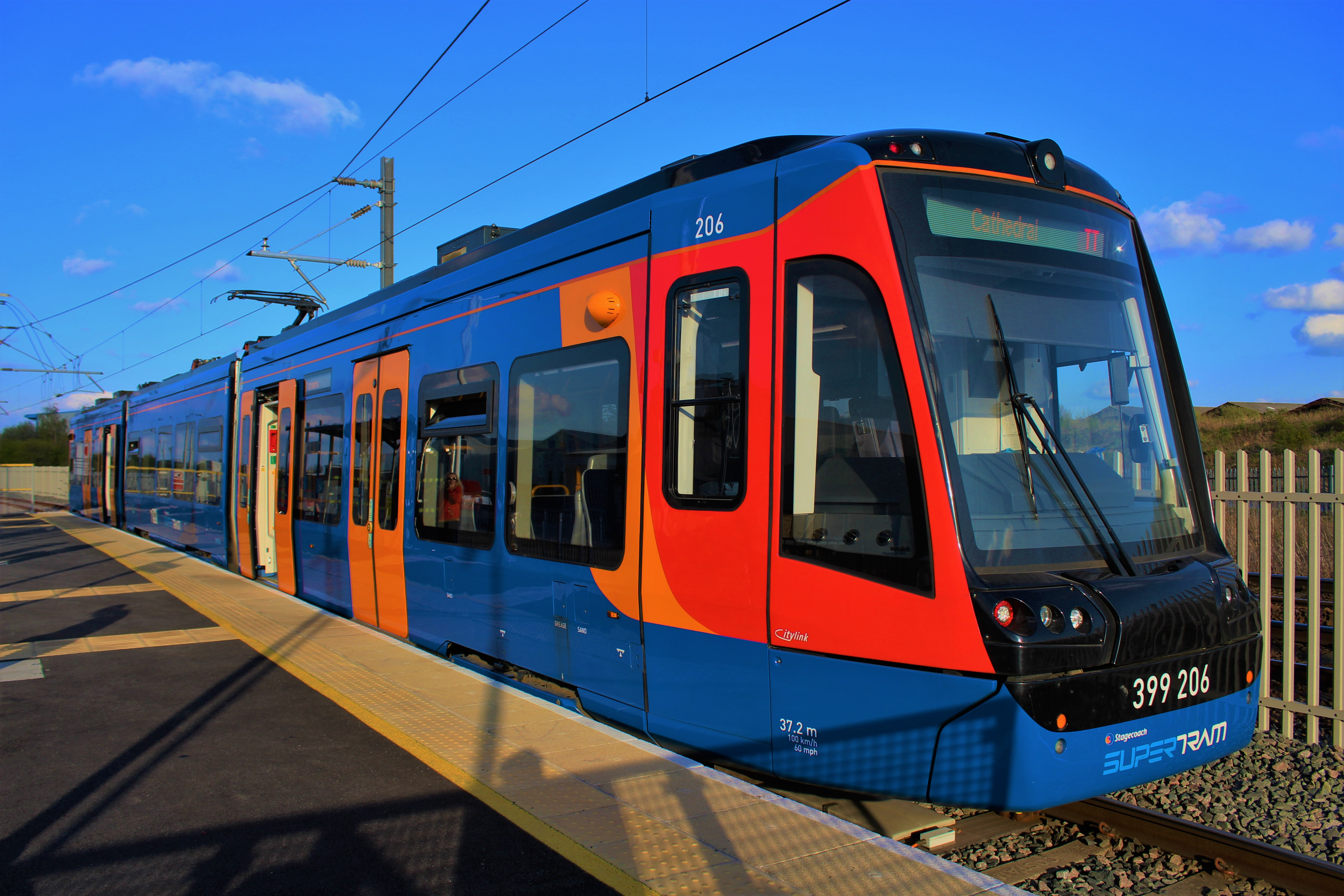

General information
- Location: Parkgate, Borough of Rotherham; England
- Coordinates: 53°26′35″N 1°20′36″W
- Grid reference: SK437942
- Transit authority: South Yorkshire Passenger Transport Executive
- Platforms: 1
- Tram routes: TT

Construction
- Structure type: At-grade
- Parking: 95 spaces
- Accessible: Yes

Other information
- Status: Operational and unstaffed

History
- Opened: 25 October 2018
- Original company: Stagecoach Supertram
Location
- Location within South Yorkshire

Parkgate is a tram-train station on the South Yorkshire Supertram network. It opened on 25 October 2018, following the opening of the extension from Tinsley Meadowhall South to Rotherham, and serves the suburb of Parkgate in South Yorkshire.

It is situated next to the Parkgate shopping park, which is located to the north-east of the town centre, near the border with the village of Rawmarsh, South Yorkshire.

== History ==
Parkgate is part of the Sheffield to Rotherham tram-train pilot scheme, which is the first of its kind in the United Kingdom. The scheme involved extending the Sheffield Supertram network to Rotherham Central from Tinsley Meadowhall South, mostly via low-use freight lines, before continuing to the terminus at Parkgate. The scheme ended up going over budget, with a final cost of £75 million.

It was planned that Parkgate would be the hub for longer distance inter-regional services, while Rotherham Central would be the hub for local services. Plans suggested that the construction of the station would cost around £14 million (£53 million including the railway service to Leeds), delivering economic benefits worth over £100 million.

A study later concluded that the expansion of Rotherham Central would not go ahead, as it would cost £161 million to expand the station, but only deliver benefits worth £76 million.

== Layout ==
Parkgate station has only one platform facing the railway lines, and a short pathway and a pedestrian crossing connects it to the main shopping park.

There are 95 free parking spaces at the station, for use by tram-train passengers.

== Services ==
As of 2024, the station is served by two tram-trains per hour.

Rolling stock used: Class 399 Tram-Train

Preceding station	South Yorkshire Supertram	Following station
Rotherham Central towards Cathedral	Tram-Train Route	Terminus
