= Hillsborough (ward) =

Electoral ward in the City of Sheffield, South Yorkshire, England

Coordinates: 53.405°N 1.495°W

- Shown within Sheffield

- Location within Sheffield
- Population: 18,605 (2011 census)
- Metropolitan borough: City of Sheffield
- Metropolitan county: South Yorkshire
- Region: Yorkshire and the Humber
- Country: England
- Sovereign state: United Kingdom
- UK Parliament: Sheffield Hillsborough
- Councillors: Christine Kubo (Green Party); Toby Mallinson (Green Party); Richard Tinsley (Green Party)

Hillsborough is an electoral ward which includes the districts of Malin Bridge, Owlerton, Wadsley and Wisewood. It is one of the 28 electoral wards in City of Sheffield, England. It is located in the northwestern part of the city and covers an area of 4.6 km^{2}. The population of this ward in 2011 was 18,605 people in 8,012 households.

== Governance ==
Since the 2010 general election Hillsborough ward is in Sheffield Brightside and Hillsborough UK parliamentary constituency. Prior to this it was covered by Sheffield Hillsborough. Since the 2015 local government boundary review, Hillsborough ward also partially lies within the boundaries of Sheffield Central constituency.

== Districts of Hillsborough ward ==
=== Hillsborough ===
Hillsborough (grid reference SK325904) is a suburb in northwest Sheffield. It lies at the point where the River Loxley and the River Rivelin flow into the River Don.

Hillsborough lies on the Sheffield Supertram route, and is home to a number of industries. Liquorice Allsorts are manufactured by Bassetts in Hillsborough. The district is also a shopping area, centred on Hillsborough Corner.

Landmarks in the district include the Hillsborough Barracks, Hillsborough House and Hillsborough Arena in Hillsborough Park and the Regent Court flats.

Opened in 1994, Sheffield Supertram's northern terminuses (Malin Bridge and Middlewood) are in or near Hillsborough, and in the centre of Hillsborough lies the Hillsborough Interchange which is a local hub for buses and trams near Hillsborough Barracks. High Frequency Buses to/via City Centre – First South Yorkshire – 18, 52a, 81, 82, 97, 98 and 135 Stagecoach Sheffield – 52 (evenings only) and M92 . Powells 61, 62.

Hillsborough is a large suburb, and because of its prominence (particularly its large shopping area), and the presence of "Hillsborough" stadium in Owlerton, even local people tend to extend its boundaries beyond the strict definitions usually counting Owlerton as part of Hillsborough, and often Malin Bridge, Wadsley and Middlewood too.

=== Wadsley ===
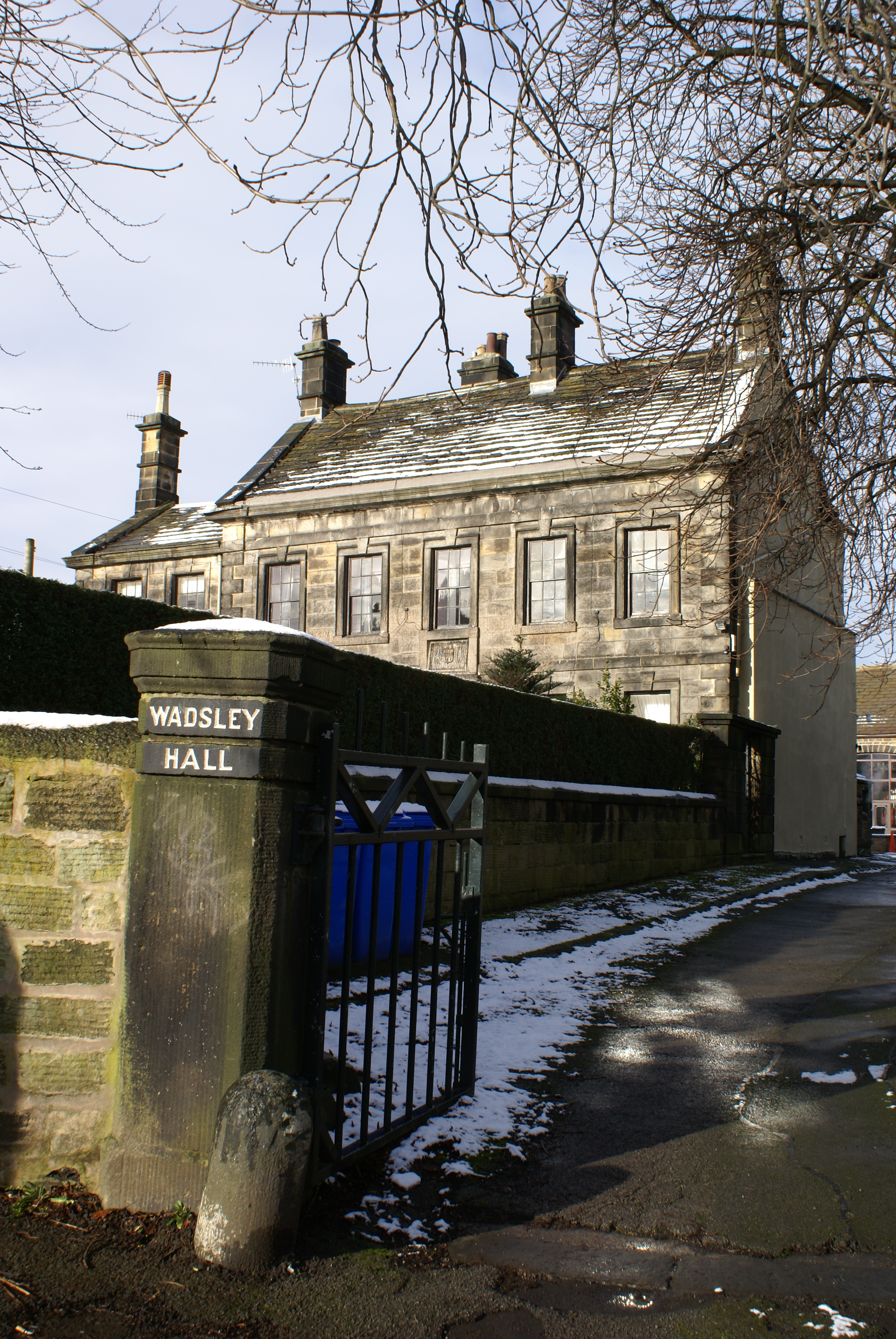
Wadsley Hall

Wadsley (grid reference SK317906) is a village—now a district of Sheffield—that dates from Saxon times. Its name comes from the Old English Wadde's Leah, which means 'Wadde's forest clearing'. Wadsley hall is the former residence of the lords of this manor. It was much altered in 1722 by George Bamforth, and it was the birthplace of Sir John Fowler (15 July 1817 – 20 November 1898) designer of the Forth Rail Bridge. It has its own parish church. It is not the same district as Wadsley Bridge, which is near Owlerton.

=== Wisewood ===
Wisewood is the area at the top of the hill between the Rivers Don and Loxley. It is mostly the Sutton Estate built by the William Sutton Housing Trust, and the Wisewood Estate. The Wisewood Estate was known locally as the Button Estate (in contrast to Sutton). When originally built in the 1930s many of the occupants worked in uniformed occupations, such as policemen and tram conductors, and the uniforms were noted for their buttons.

=== Malin Bridge ===
Malin Bridge (grid reference SK327895) is in the northwest of Sheffield at the confluence of the rivers Loxley and Rivelin, just above the confluence with the River Don at Owlerton.

Malin Bridge was devastated by the Great Sheffield flood, which happened in 1864 when the Dale Dyke Dam collapsed while it was filling for the first time. The flood swept down the River Loxley, past Malin Bridge and Hillsborough corner, into the River Don and on into Sheffield and on to Rotherham. In the space of around twenty minutes, nearly 100 people lost their lives as the floodwaters and its payload swept much of the buildings and their occupants away.

=== Owlerton ===
Owlerton (grid reference SK338904) is a former hamlet now a district of Sheffield to the east of Hillsborough. The name derives from Alor-tun, which means a 'farmstead of the alders'. In the 18th century people came here in great numbers to take water from a holy well that had been discovered here. Owlerton Stadium is used for greyhound racing and speedway. Owlerton is also the location of the Hillsborough Stadium (not actually in Hillsborough on the strictest definition) where Sheffield Wednesday play their matches, and is the source of the team's nickname (the Owls), even though Owlerton is not pronounced to rhyme with Owl. Hillsborough Stadium was the site of the 1989 Hillsborough Disaster.

=== Neepsend ===
Part of the industrial suburb of Neepsend which lies on the eastern side of the River Don is in the Hillsborough electoral ward, having previously been in the Walkley ward before boundary adjustments in 2016.
