= Owlerton =

Area of Sheffield in South Yorkshire, England

Coordinates: 53.404492°N 1.496109°W

- Location within South Yorkshire
- OS grid reference: SK336899
- Metropolitan borough: Sheffield
- Metropolitan county: South Yorkshire
- Region: Yorkshire and the Humber
- Country: England
- Sovereign state: United Kingdom
- Post town: SHEFFIELD
- Postcode district: S6
- Dialling code: 0114
- Police: South Yorkshire
- Fire: South Yorkshire
- Ambulance: Yorkshire
- UK Parliament: Sheffield Brightside and Hillsborough

Owlerton (/ˈoʊlərtən/) is a suburb of the city of Sheffield, England, 2.2 miles (3.5 km) northwest of the city centre near the confluence of the River Don and River Loxley. Owlerton was a small rural village from the Early Middle Ages; it became part of Sheffield in the early 1900s as the city expanded. Owlerton is just east of Hillsborough and within the Hillsborough ward. Hillsborough Stadium, Hillsborough Leisure Centre and Hillsborough College are in Owlerton.

The name is believed to come from the abundant growth of alder trees in the area.

It was the home of Owlerton F.C. in the 19th century.

== History ==
Owlerton existed in Anglo-Saxon times when it was documented as an enclosed farmstead in the 9th century. In the early 12th century, it became a small manor following the Norman conquest of England. The Normans created several of these small manors which were reliant on Sheffield Castle and included ones at the nearby hamlets of Wadsley and Shirecliffe. The earliest written record of the settlement as a manor is from 1297 when it was recorded that Thomas de Schefeld, lord of the manor of Owlerton was one of the original witnesses of the establishment of the Burgery of Sheffield.

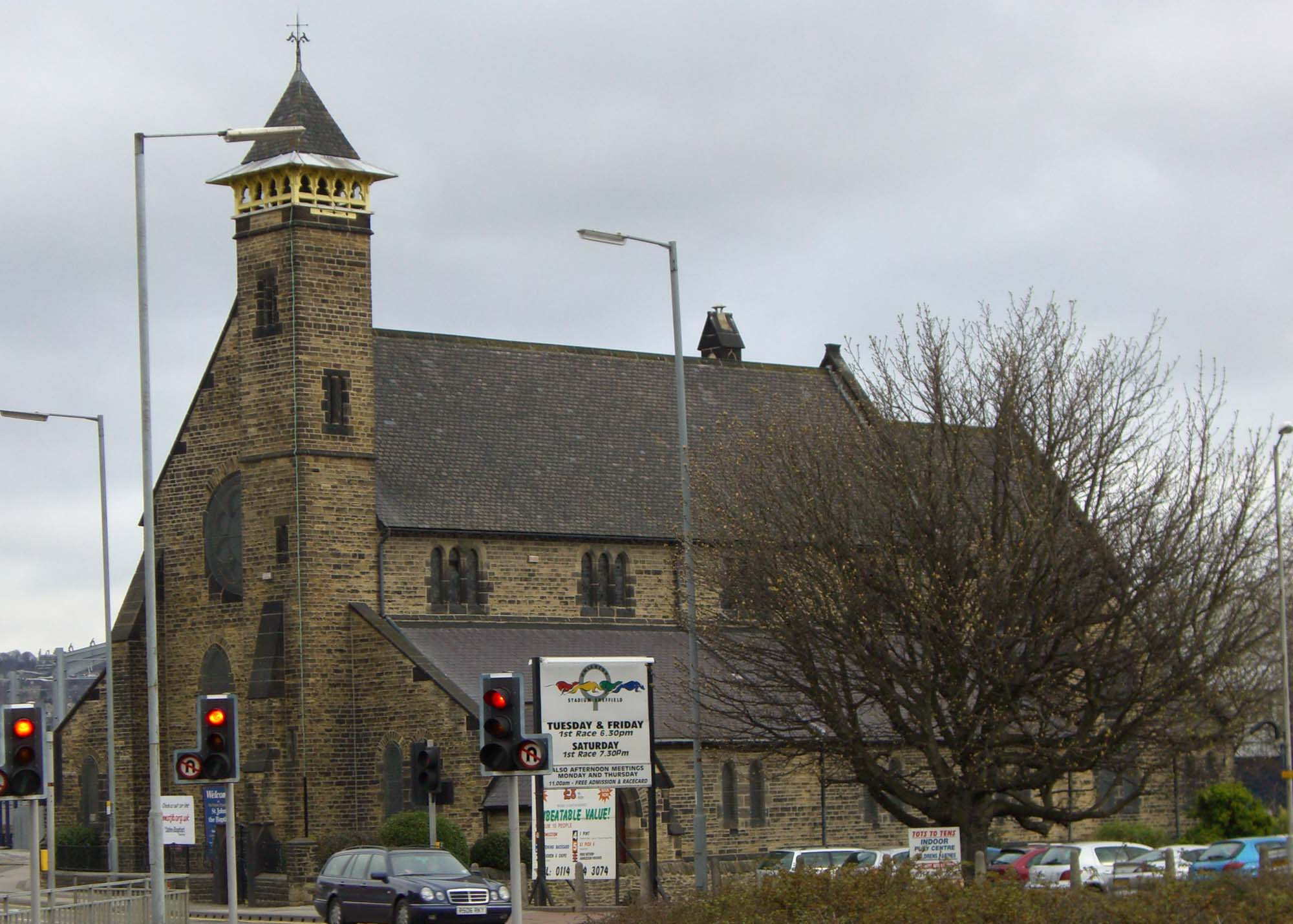
Owlerton church on Penistone Road

There is no further record until 1534 when Thomas Creswyke built the manor house (Owlerton Hall). The Creswykes were a prominent local family and had owned land in the area since 1339. Margaret Creswick married Thomas Steade in 1696; he later built Burrowlee House. Succeeding lords of Owlerton were the Staceys, the Southabys followed by the Bamforths who were lords of the manor until 1776, when the family name became extinct. It then passed to the Burgoyne family who held the title and land until 1926 when all manors ceased to exist as a result of a Property Act. Owlerton Hall, which stood at the present day junction of Penistone Road and Bradfield Road was converted to a row of cottages in the 18th century before being demolished in May 1931.

In the eighteenth century, a well was discovered in Owlerton that was said to have curative properties.

Situated below the confluence of the Rivelin and Loxley rivers the area suffered badly during the great flood of 1864.

During the 19th and the first half of the 20th century Owlerton became industrialised, using the water power of the Rivers Loxley and Don to drive machinery for steel and tool making, corn mills and paper mills. Owlerton became part of the City of Sheffield in 1901 with the new tram service from the city centre starting on 26 January 1901, running to the bottom of Parkside Road.

== Present day ==
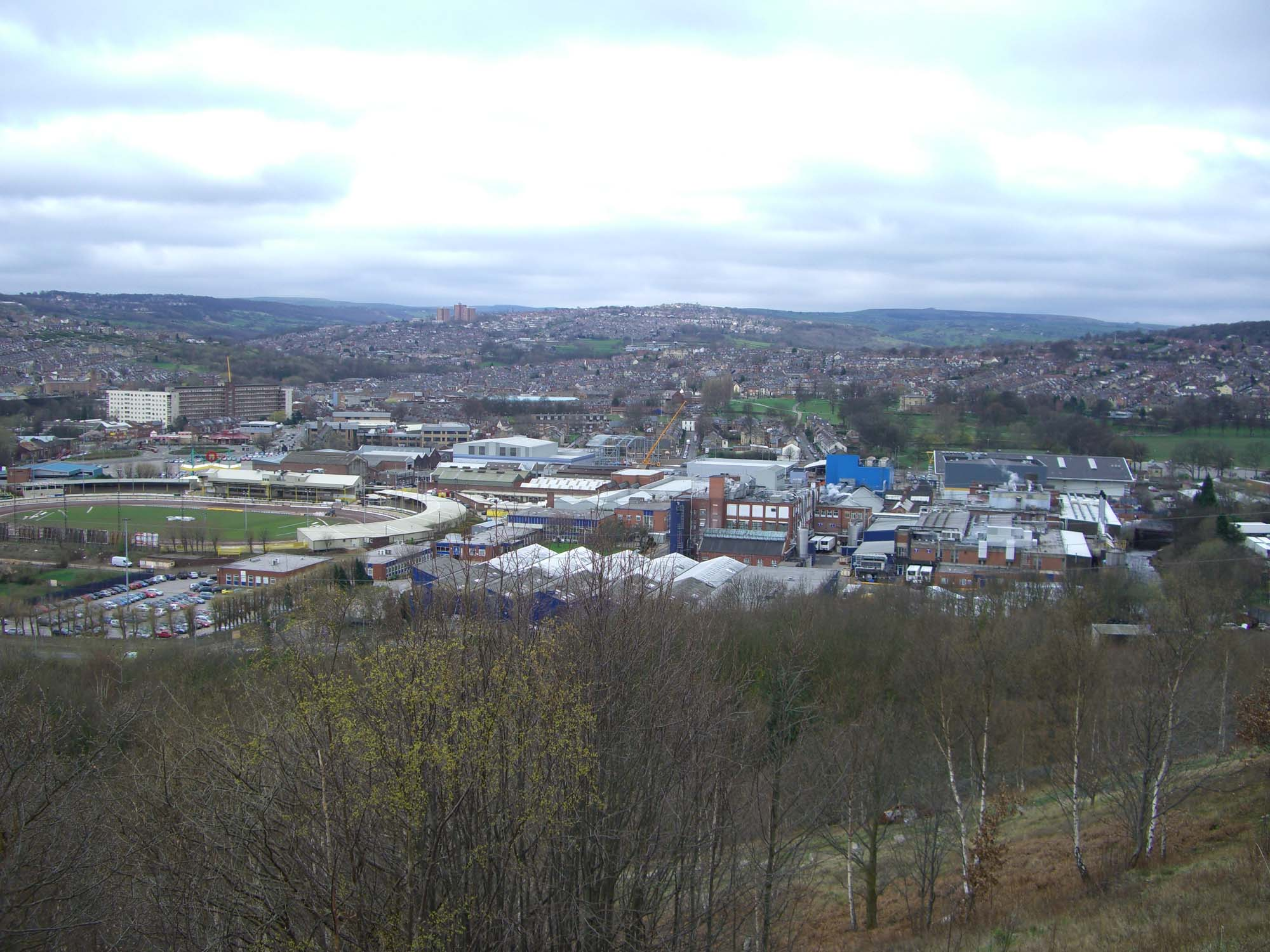
A general view of Owlerton from Shirecliffe. Owlerton Stadium is on the left and the suburbs of Hillsborough and Stannington are in the background.

The face of present-day Owlerton was changed radically in the mid-1980s when the main A61 road (Penistone Road) was converted into a dual carriageway; this resulted in many of the old terraced houses and several public houses being demolished. An area of housing on the eastern side of the road was cleared to make way for the new Hillsborough Leisure Centre. The Victoria, Royal Hotel, Sportsmans Group, Cambridge Inn and Rose Inn pubs were all knocked down in the new developments along the new road in the ensuing few years.

Remaining pubs in the area are the Old Crown, New Barrack Tavern and the Masons Arms on Capel Street (demolished in 2015). The redevelopment in the late 1980s and 90s resulted in the area getting a KFC, Pizza Hut, B&Q, and two large franchised car dealers (Citroën and Peugeot). The area suffered in the 2007 floods with the Penistone Road area suffering when the Don and Loxley burst their banks, the Sheffield Wednesday ground was flooded along with many dwellings and the Wardsend bridge over the Don was swept away.

== Significant buildings and structures ==
=== Hillsborough Leisure Centre ===
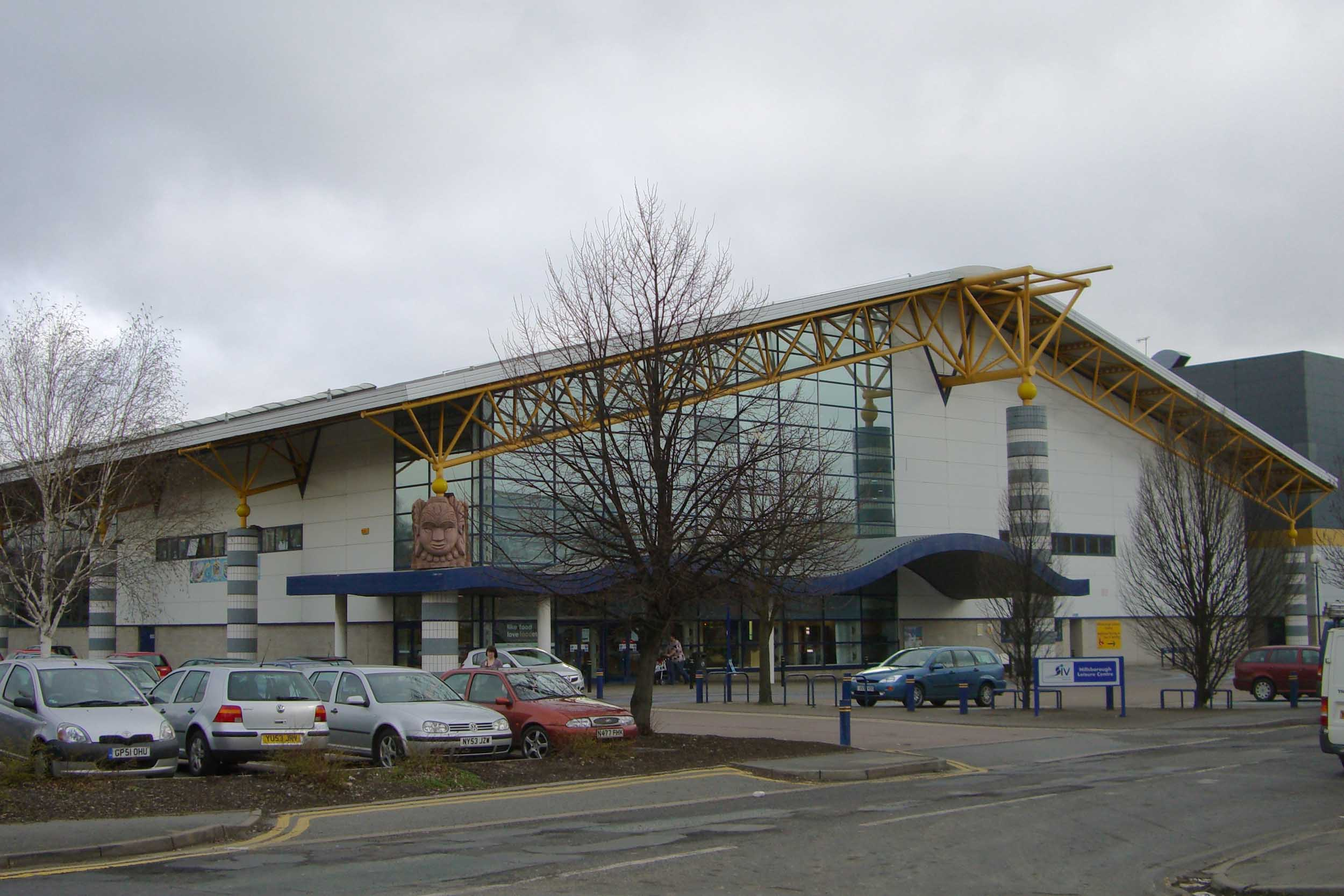
Hillsborough Leisure Centre

Hillsborough Leisure Centre is situated on Penistone Road at grid reference SK335902. It was built in 1989 by the structural engineers William Saunders & Partners for the 1991 World Student Games. The centre is run by Sheffield International Venues and features a large leisure pool (slides, flumes, features etc.) and also a sizable teaching pool, a large sports hall and gymnasium. The swimming pool has a pioneering moving floor which allows it to be used for both competition and leisure swimming as well as a wave machine and water slides. The centre has received the award of UK Centre of the Year by the Fitness Industry Association (FIA) on four occasions. The building is of noteworthy design, featuring extensive glazing within the walls and roof trusses which are supported on external columns.

Hillsborough Leisure Centre is operated by Everyone Active on behalf of Sheffield City Council.

=== St. John the Baptist Church ===
St. John the Baptist church is also on Penistone Road (SK336899) and was built by J.B. Mitchell-Withers at a cost of £6,300 in 1874. It was consecrated on 29 July by William Thomson, Archbishop of York. It has a slender bell tower with wooden belfry and a pyramidal slate roof. The interior has a seating capacity of 600 and includes a high chancel arch, oak reredos installed in 1907 and various stained glass memorial windows.

=== Wardsend Viaduct ===
Is situated at SK337907 and is popularly known as the Five Arches, it was constructed to carry the Sheffield, Ashton-Under-Lyne and Manchester Railway which opened in 1845 over the Scraith Wood ravine. Herries Road (A6102) was constructed in the ravine in the 1920s and the viaduct now spans this road. The railway was once a busy inter-city line; it lost out to the Hope Valley Line after the 1960s as a route to Manchester. The last passenger train crossed the viaduct in 1983.

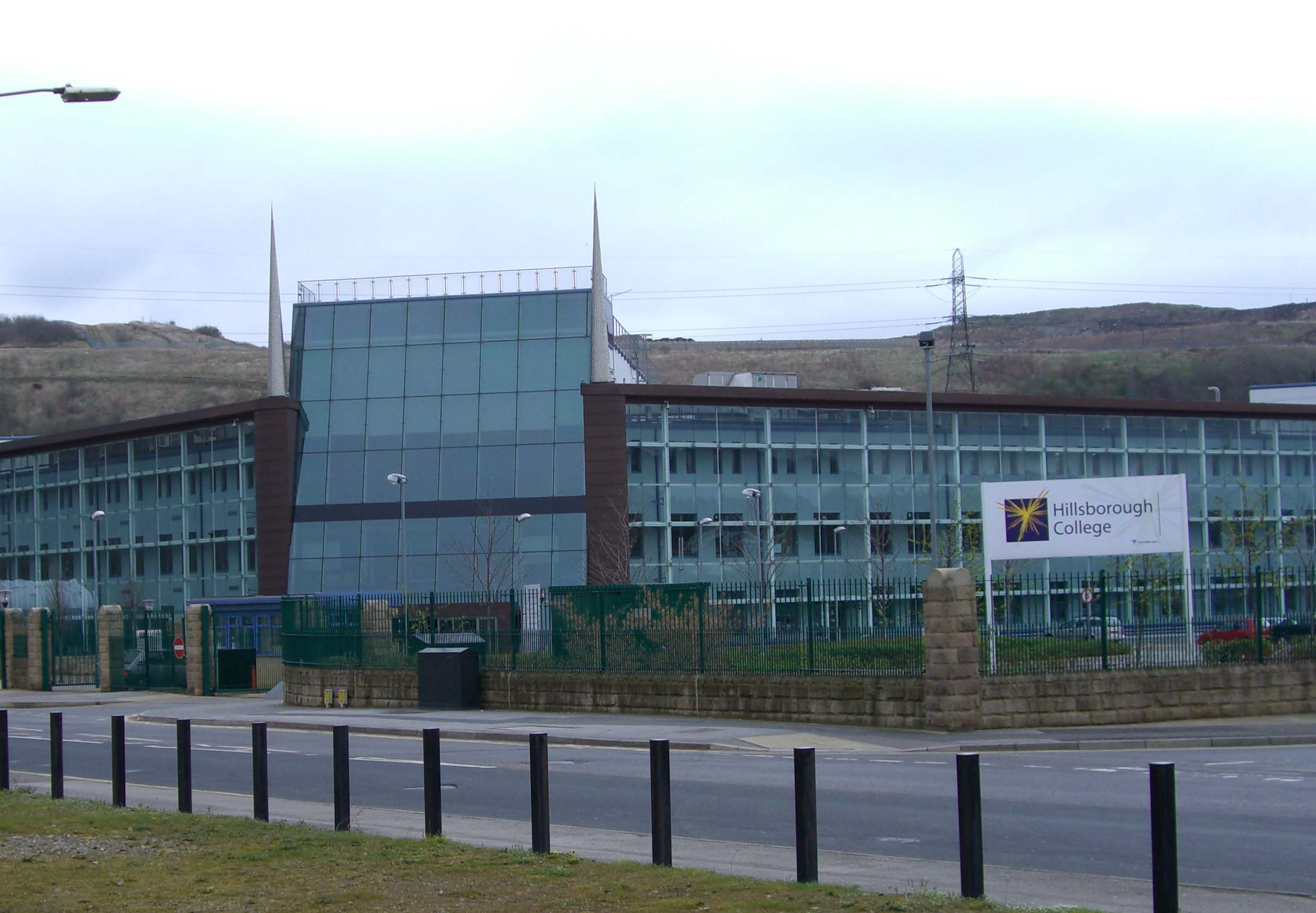
Hillsborough College

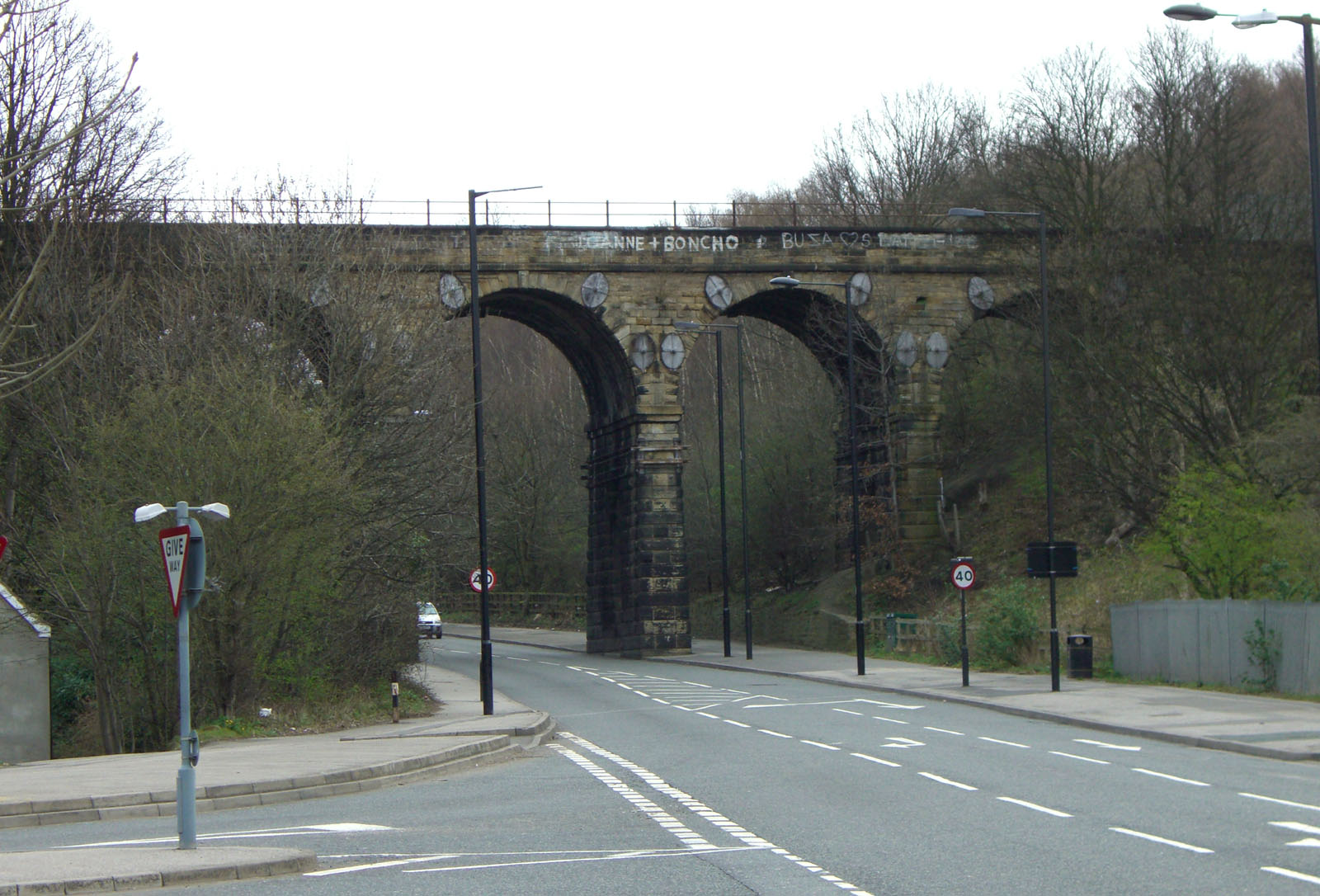
The Five Arches or Wardsend viaduct

=== Hillsborough College ===
Situated on Livesey Street (SK340899) this £27 million institute opened in 2006 and is part of The Sheffield College. Its design has large amounts of glass integrated into it and uses the Pilkington frameless glazing system.

=== Hillsborough Stadium ===
The stadium (SK332906) is the home ground of Sheffield Wednesday, who played their first game there in 1899. The ground was built on land formerly part of the Hillsborough House estate. The ground was called Owlerton Stadium until 1914 and gave Sheffield Wednesday their nickname of "The Owls".

=== Burrowlee House ===
Situated on Broughton Road (SK334901), it was built in 1711 and is the oldest building in the Owlerton and Hillsborough area.

=== Owlerton Stadium ===
The stadium (SK338900) was opened on Easter Saturday, 30 March 1929 for the new craze of Speedway. In 1932 a 500-metre Greyhound racing track was constructed around the edge of the speedway track. There is a casino called Napoleon's built on the car park.

== Local firms ==
=== George Bassett & Co. Ltd ===
The longest established and best known firm in Owlerton is the George Bassett & Co. Ltd sweet factory, made world-famous by the manufacture of Liquorice Allsorts. The firm was established in Sheffield in 1842, but did not come to Owlerton until 1934 when Bassett's son in law Samuel Meggit Johnson built a large factory on Beulah Road (SK337902). The factory was enlarged in the inter-war period as new products such as Jelly Babies, Wine Gums and Liquorice Novelties were added to the range. In April 1939 a huge fire damaged the building severely as hundreds of tons of sugar burned with ferocity. In 1989 Bassetts was purchased by the Cadbury Schweppes group and became part of its confectionery subsidiary Cadbury Trebor Bassett. On 19 January 2010, it was announced that Cadbury and Kraft Foods had reached a deal whereby Kraft would purchase Cadbury for £8.40 per share, valuing Cadbury at £11.5bn.

=== Swann-Morton Ltd ===
Swann-Morton Ltd are one of the top producers in the world of scalpels and surgical blades, manufacturing over 1.5 million blades a day. They export to over 100 countries around the world. Mr W.R. Swann, Mr J.A. Morton and Miss D. Fairweather founded the business in August 1932 and moved firstly to Bradfield Road and then after the war to a purpose built facility in Owlerton Green. (SK335899). The firm was originally a razor blade manufacturer but over the years emphasis was shifted to surgical blades which was a growing market. In 2000, the firm invested heavily and expanded the works to increase despatch, sterile storage, laboratories and production facilities. Further expansion took place in 2019, with the acquisition of premises on the opposite side of Penistone Road, to be named Woodland Works.

=== Other businesses ===
Other prominent firms in Owlerton include Symmetry Medical on Beulah Road, a leading provider of implants, instruments and cases to orthopaedic device manufacturers. Hillfoot Steel is a steel forger and stockholder which has been in Owlerton since 1923. There are several other small engineering and steel companies.

The Sheffield Assay Office is situated in the area; it moved to a purpose-built single-storey building on Beulah Road in July 2008. This was after an upswing in business as the organisation moved into advanced analytical services in addition to its traditional assay and hallmarking work.
