= Hillsborough Trinity Methodist Church =

Methodist church in Sheffield, South Yorkshire, England

Coordinates: 53.4086°N 1.5042°W

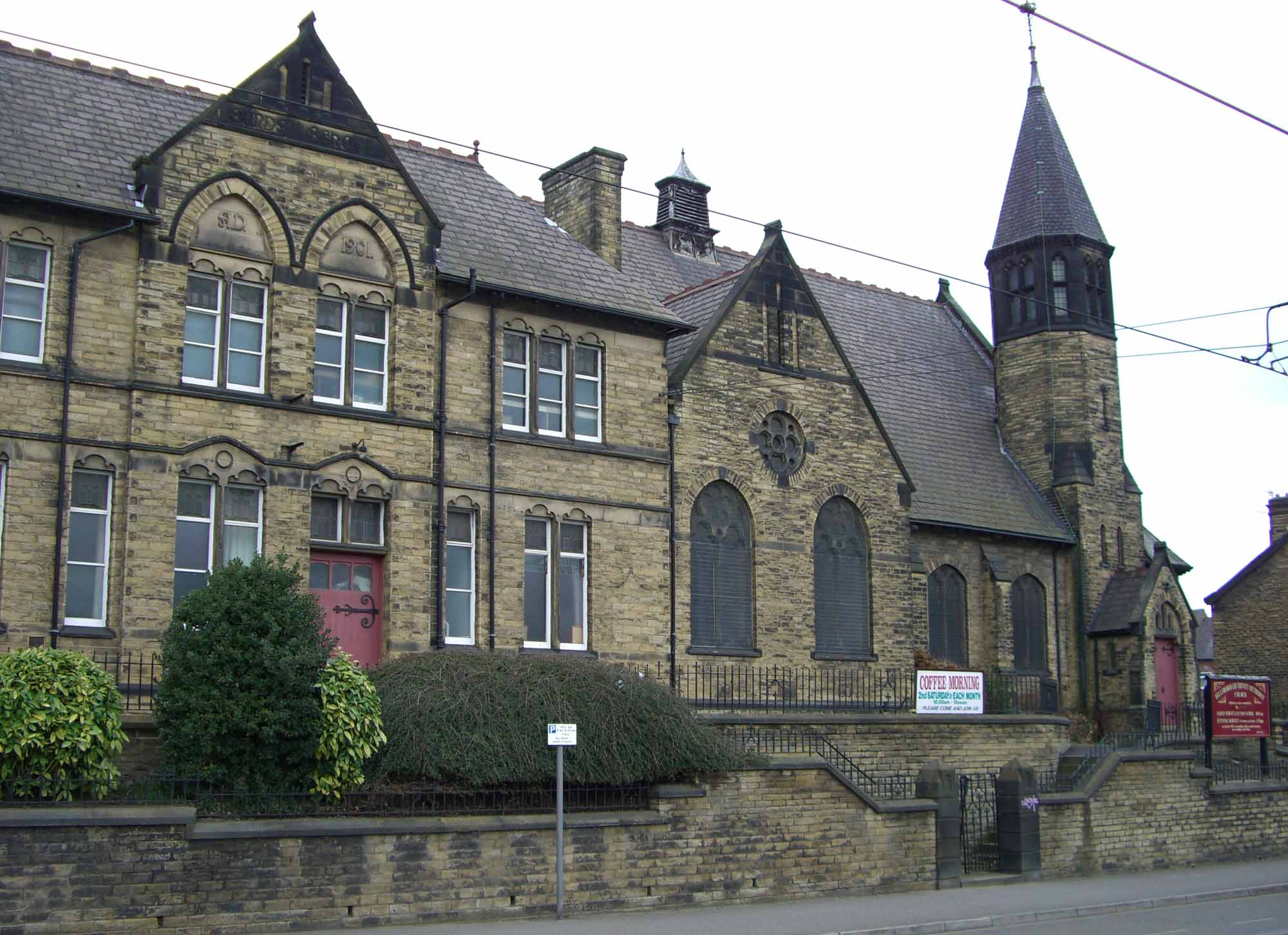
Hillsborough Trinity Methodist Church

Hillsborough Trinity Methodist Church is situated in the Hillsborough area of Sheffield in South Yorkshire, England. It stands 2.5 miles (4 km) north-west of the city centre on Middlewood Road across from Hillsborough Park at grid reference SK330902.

== History ==
The church was built at the beginning of the 20th century by John W. Firth to cater to the increasing population as it expanded into the countryside around Sheffield. The site was purchased from J. Willis Dixon of Hillsborough Hall (now Hillsborough library) in December 1898 for £547. An “Iron Church” was erected on nearby Leader road and was used for temporary worship while the church was being built.

Hillsborough Trinity was designed in the Gothic style and cost £5,500, opening on 1 September 1902. The church was originally designated as Methodist New Connexion, one of the many factions of the original Wesleyan Methodist church, it merged into the main Methodist Church of Great Britain in 1932. Methodism reached its peak at the beginning of the 20th century when there were eight Methodist churches in the Hillsborough area. However, Hillsborough Trinity is the only one remaining, as the other seven have been demolished or now being used for other purposes. The church has changed very little externally over the years, although a new church hall was added in 1963. The interior of the church has been modified to cater for the needs of modern worship, the original balcony is now not used because of safety concerns.

== Present day and future ==
The church has extensive adjoining buildings (AD 1901 and 1963) which are still used for Sunday School as well as Brownies, Boys' Brigade as well as many other community events such as coffee mornings, Polly's Parlour (community cafe), toddler groups, craft group, lunch club and other community group meetings. The church is undergoing extensive structural work for the future to make the church a major community building. The plans, form three phases, with phase one having completed in 2014. Phase two began in January 2015 to create a new entrance to church, the church office and improved toilet and shower facilities.

Previous refurbishments includes the hall's stage being removed to extend the space; the size of the kitchen was increased by moving the wall separating it from the beginners room. As well as a re-size, the kitchen had a full new fit out of equipment and work-surfaces. Two new rooms were added in the loft space above what was the stage. and the whole of the church was re-painted.

== Youth Groups ==
The 20th Sheffield Company - Boys' Brigade is based at the church and runs the Anchor, Junior, Company and Senior Sections on Thursday evenings.

Scouts, Cubs and Beavers meet on a Monday evening and Guides, Brownies and Rainbows meet on a Tuesday evening. In addition to this, regular church services for the Uniformed Groups (i.e. Boys Brigade, Guides, Scouts et al.) are held throughout the year.
