= Burrowlee House =

House in Sheffield, England

Coordinates: 53.40667°N 1.49906°W

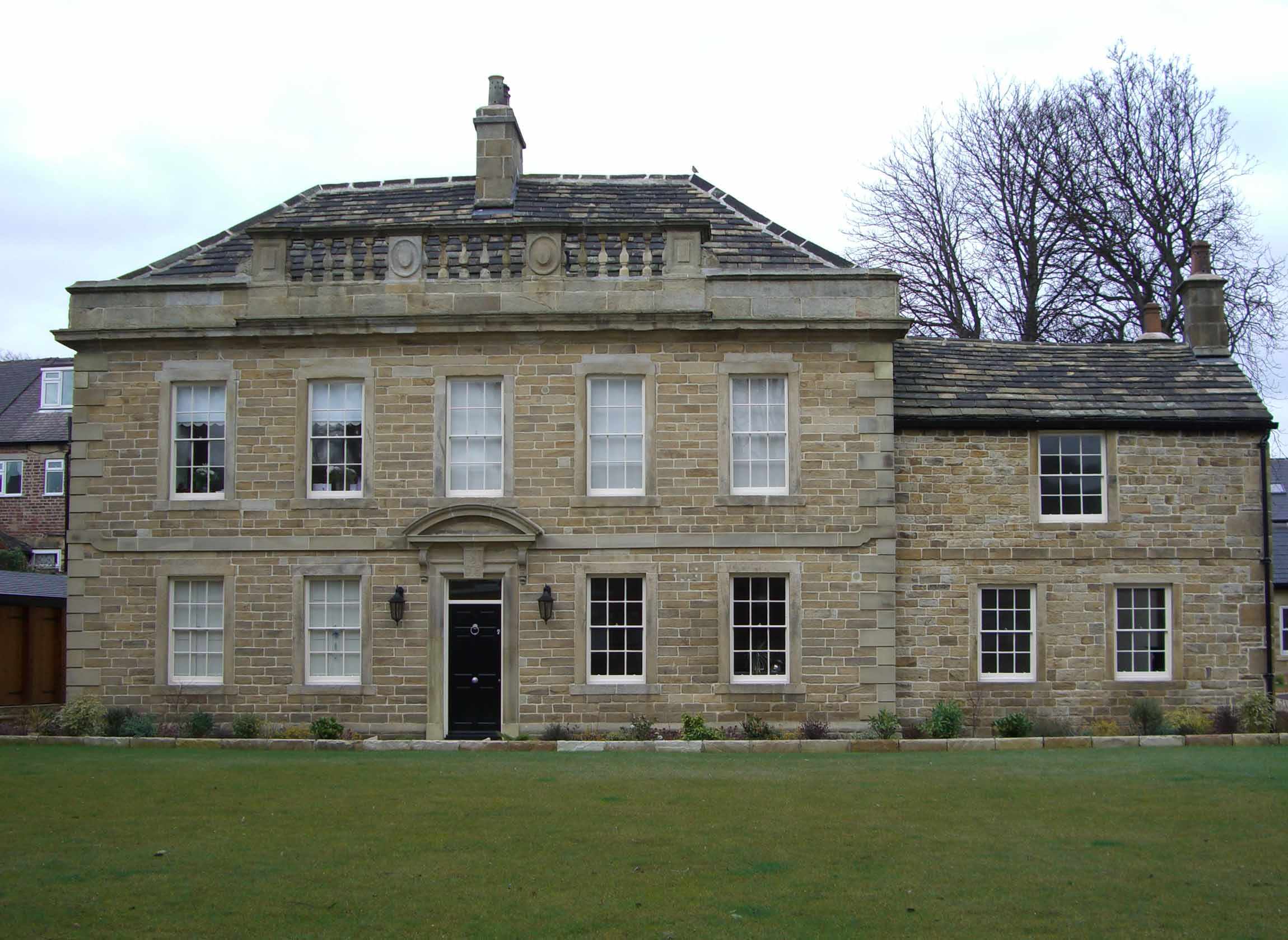
Burrowlee House.

Burrowlee House is an English Georgian style building situated at grid reference SK334901 on Broughton Road in the Owlerton district of Sheffield, some 2.5 miles (4 km) north-west of the city centre. It is the oldest building in the Owlerton and Hillsborough area and was one of the first houses constructed wholly from brick in Sheffield. The house is a grade two listed building with two storeys and five bays with a stone balustrade over the three middle bays, there is a date stone over the main door.

== History ==
A cottage existed on the site in the 16th century and is recorded in the deeds from that period. Burrowlee House was constructed in 1711 by Thomas Steade (1672–1739): the Steades were a family of local landowners who also built the nearby Hillsborough House, which stands just 250 metres to the west. Stead had married Elizabeth Creswick in 1696, whose father was Lord of the Manor of Owlerton. The couple lived in the house upon completion and their initials are still visible in the date stone above the main door.

Burrowlee remained a private dwelling until the 1920s, although at some point in time it seems to have been divided into two apartments. The house was then purchased by the Education Department and was used as a clinic and offices. In the 1960s it was closed and boarded up and for a period of time looked like being demolished until Sheffield City Council decided to renovate it. In the early 1980s the Council used the house as a Community Education Centre. Bryan Frisby and Neil Trinder bought Burrowlee from the Council in 1987 on a 99-year lease and ran their business Burrowlee Crafts and Designs from the premises, making and conserving wood furniture.

== Present day ==
In 2005 planning permission was approved for property developers Blenheim Park Developments to convert the house into new housing. New buildings were added in the same style as the main house to form Burrowlee Park Square, a series of six exclusive houses.
