= Hillsborough, Sheffield =

Suburb of Sheffield, South Yorkshire, England

Coordinates: 53.413829°N 1.500492°W

Hillsborough
- Suburb
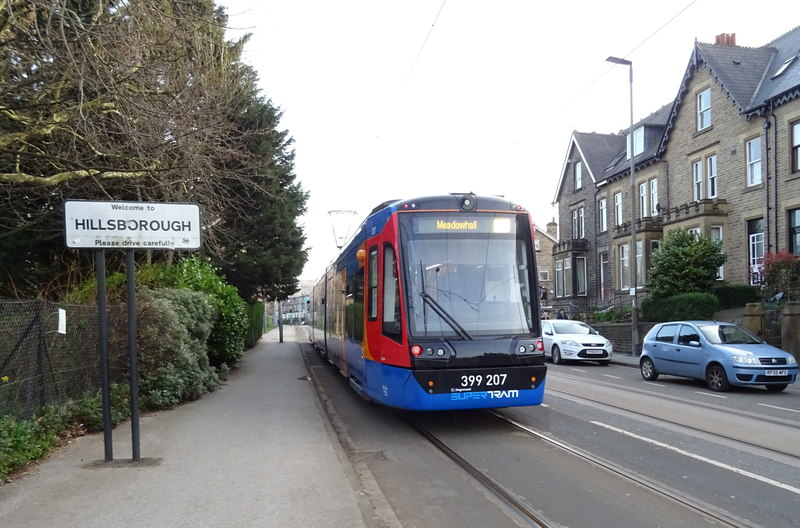
- Middlewood Road

- Location within South Yorkshire
- Population: 7,255
- OS grid reference: SK325904
- Metropolitan borough: Sheffield
- Metropolitan county: South Yorkshire
- Region: Yorkshire and the Humber
- Country: England
- Sovereign state: United Kingdom
- Post town: SHEFFIELD
- Postcode district: S6
- Dialling code: 0114
- Police: South Yorkshire
- Fire: South Yorkshire
- Ambulance: Yorkshire
- UK Parliament: Sheffield Brightside and Hillsborough

Hillsborough (grid reference SK332896) is a suburb in north-west Sheffield, South Yorkshire, England. The centre of the district is popularly thought to be 'Hillsborough Corner' where Langsett Road, Middlewood Road, Holme Lane and Bradfield Road all meet. The Hillsborough ward population at the 2011 Census was 18,605.

== History ==
The name of the suburb comes from Hillsborough House built and named in 1779 in tribute to the Earl of Hillsborough who lived in Hillsborough, County Down. Approximately 42 people were killed in the immediate Hillsborough area in the Great Sheffield Flood of 1864 and there was much devastation. The area only started to be built up as the district recovered from the flood with the success of the steel and engineering industries in Sheffield creating a demand for suburban housing. In 1889 Hillsborough was described in Kelly's Directory as “a large and increasing suburb of Sheffield”. In 1901 the Hillsborough area was incorporated within the City of Sheffield. The arrival of the electric tram in 1903 was a big boost to the development of the suburb; it initially ran as far as the top of Parkside Road before extending to Middlewood in 1913. House building continued until around 1909 when most of present-day Hillsborough’s road infrastructure had been created.

== Present day ==
Hillsborough lies on the South Yorkshire Supertram's blue and yellow routes, and is home to a number of industries. A.L. Simpkin & Co. Ltd on Hunter Road are a manufacturer of confectionery who have been established in the area since 1921. The district is also a shopping area with a lot of independent shops, some for household goods and clothes and (due to its large residential population) amenities such as butchers, green grocers and off-licences, in addition to a wide range of restaurants, cafés, pubs and bars.

Landmarks in the district include the Hillsborough Barracks, Hillsborough House which is now the Hillsborough branch library, Hillsborough Arena in Hillsborough Park, Owlerton Stadium and Regent Court flats. Hillsborough is also the home and name of the Sheffield Wednesday FC stadium.

Hillsborough baths (properly known as the Walkley and Hillsborough District Baths) on Langsett Road were built in 1926 by the Sheffield City architect F.E.P. Edwards on open fields belonging to Rawson Springs Farm. The baths (comprising a large swimming pool and slipper baths) were opened by the Lord Mayor John George Graves and have a Neo-baroque stone dressed façade with some circular windows. The building remained a swimming bath until 1991 when it was replaced by the Hillsborough Leisure Centre for swimming activities in the area. It then became the “Deep End” bar and live music venue before becoming the Rawson Spring JD Wetherspoon pub in July 2007. Other pubs in the central area of Hillsborough have more history, The Shakey (formerly The Shakespeare) and The Freemasons both pre-date the 1864 flood in which they were badly damaged.

Adjacent to the Rawson Spring pub, next to the bridge over the River Loxley stands the former HSBC UK bank branch. The building was built in 1895 for the Sheffield Union Bank by the local architect J. B. Mitchell-Withers and completed by his son after his death. The building which was constructed in the Italianate style ceased being a bank in 2017 when the branch was closed by HSBC. In 2024 in was converted in eight one and two bedroom apartments known as Bank House which opened in December of that year.

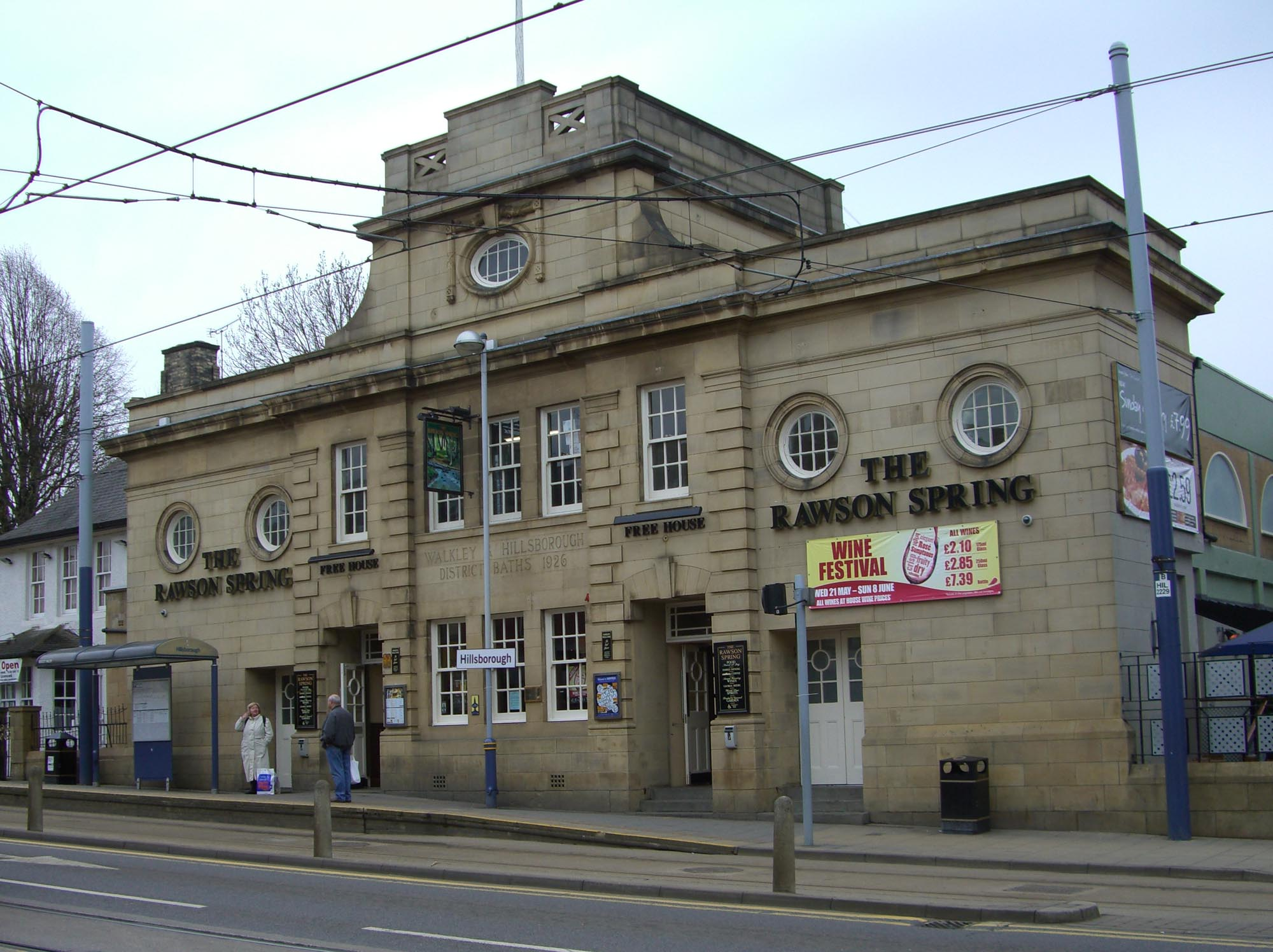
The Rawson Spring pub formerly Hillsborough baths with Hillsborough Supertram stop in front.

There are two schools within Hillsborough, Sacred Heart Catholic Primary School on Ripley Street and Hillsborough Primary School on Parkside Road.

Hillsborough has two main churches, the red-brick Sacred Heart is situated on Forbes Road and is a conspicuous landmark while Hillsborough Trinity Methodist Church is on Middlewood Road across from Hillsborough Park. There were three smaller churches in the district, however the Wadsley United Reformed Church on Carlton Road (built 1910), formerly known as the Hillsborough Congregational Church was converted into ten luxury one and two bedroom apartments in 2016 and named the Wesleyan Chapel Apartments. The Hillsborough Baptist Church is on Taplin Road; it originally opened in 1893 although it was rebuilt in 1914 by Chapman and Jenkinson. The Hillsborough Tabernacle in Proctor Place was opened in 1907 after a tin tabernacle had stood on the site since 1899. It was completely destroyed in the Sheffield Blitz attacks of 12 December 1940 and was not rebuilt until 1955, re-opening on 7 May. These five are the only remaining churches of the many in Hillsborough at the start of the 20th century.

Opened in 1994, Supertram's north-western termini (Malin Bridge and Middlewood) are in or near Hillsborough, and in the centre of Hillsborough lies the Hillsborough Interchange which is a local hub for buses and trams near Hillsborough Barracks.

== See also ==
- Hillsborough Disaster
