= Regent Court =

Residential building in Sheffield, England

Coordinates: 53.4035°N 1.4979°W

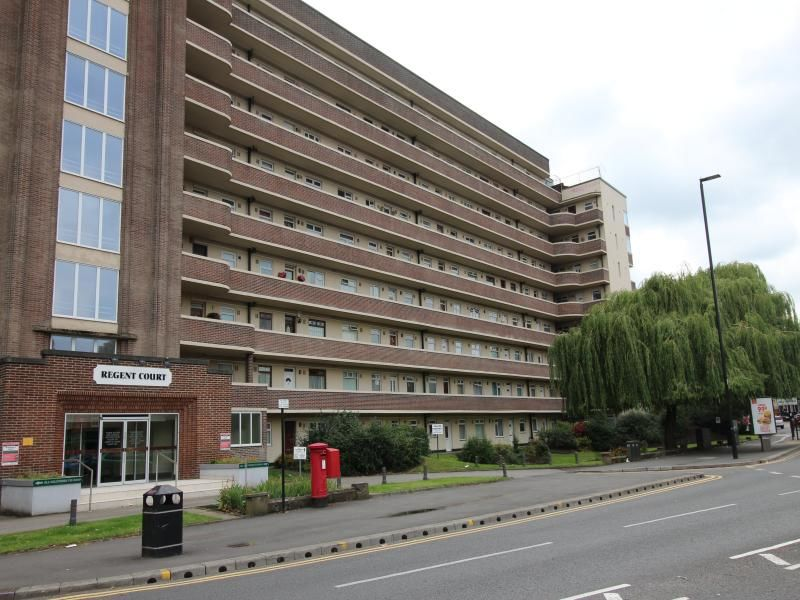
Central block of Regent Court from Bradfield Road, Hillsborough, Sheffield.

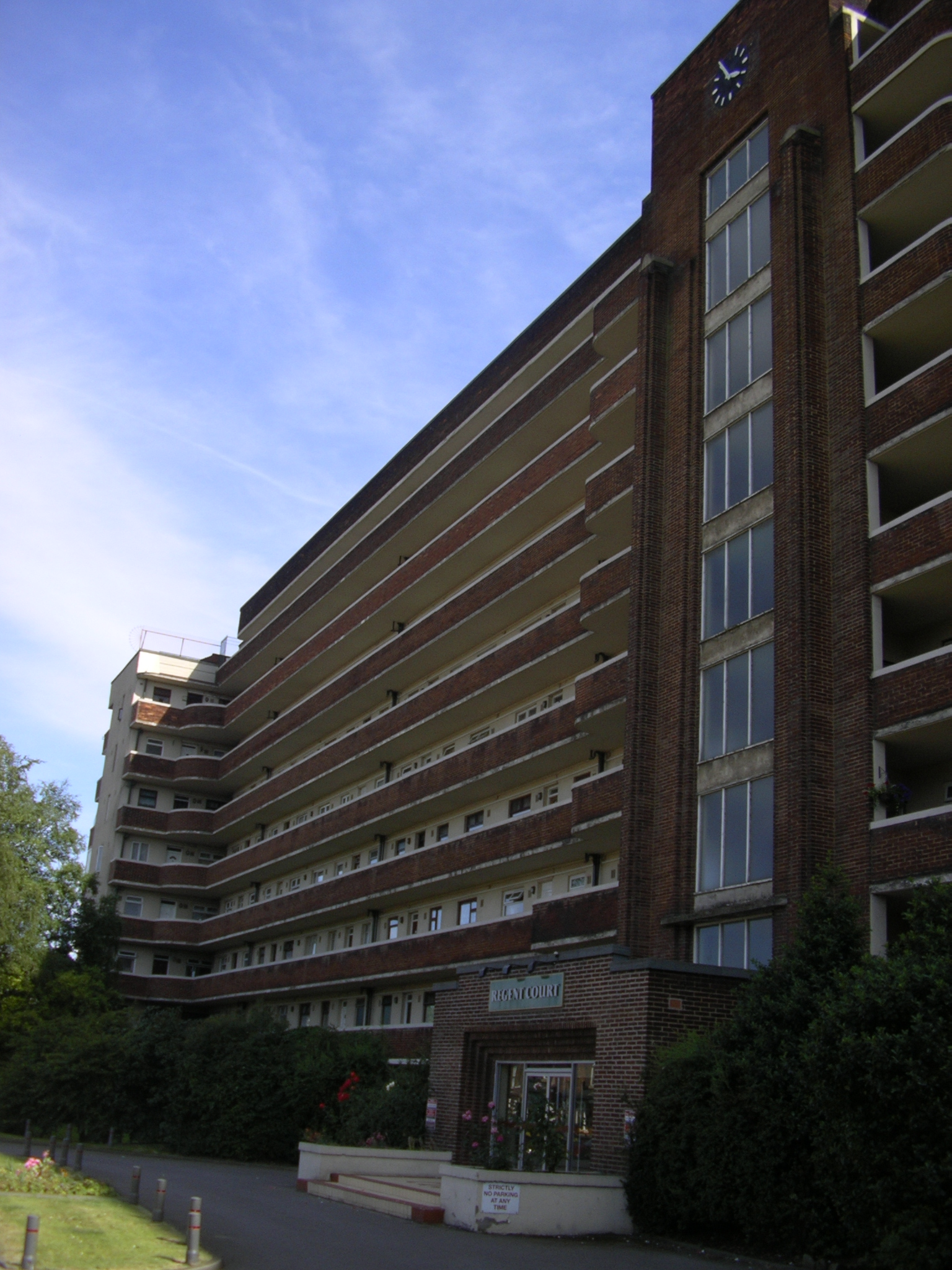
Central block of Regent Court.

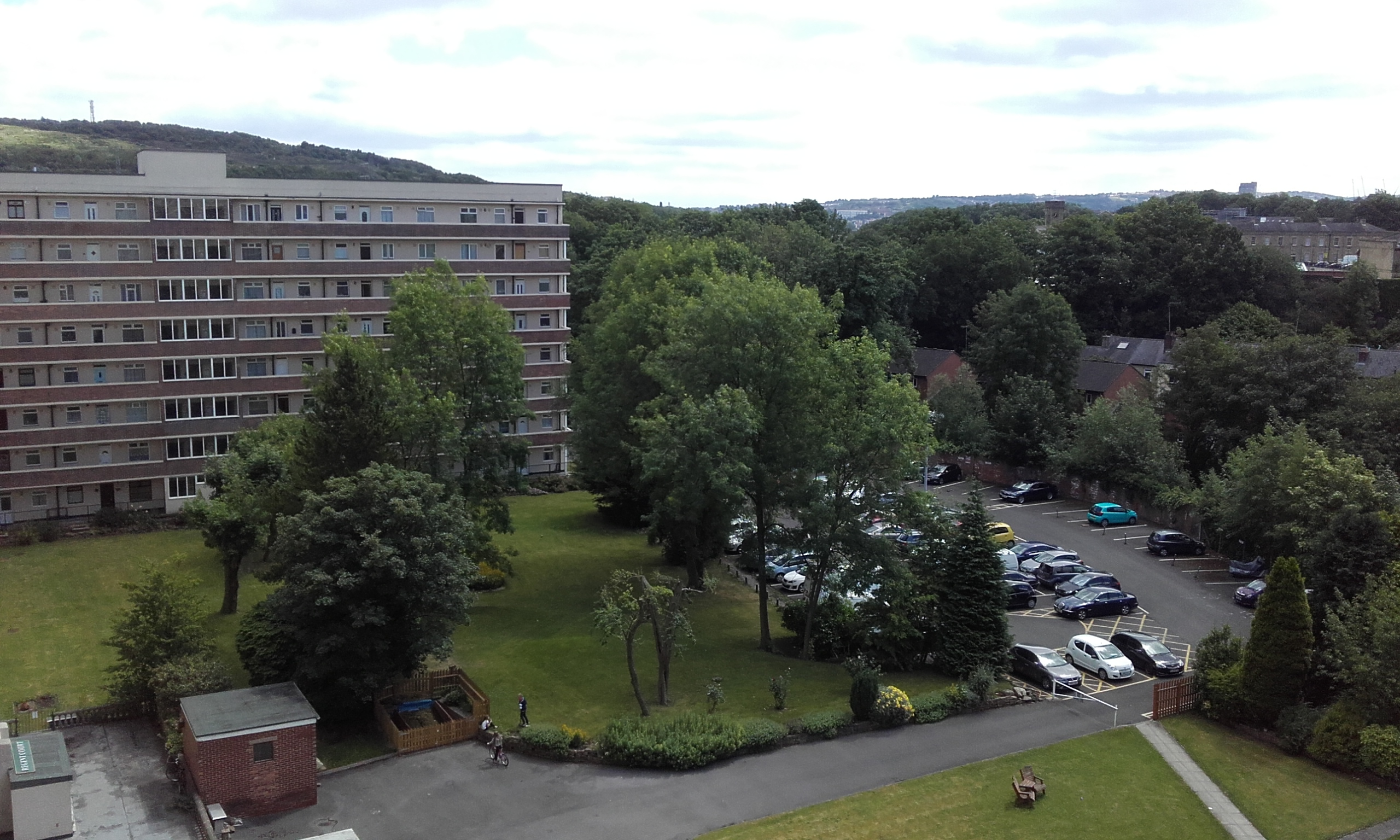
Aerial view of Regent Court back gardens and car park

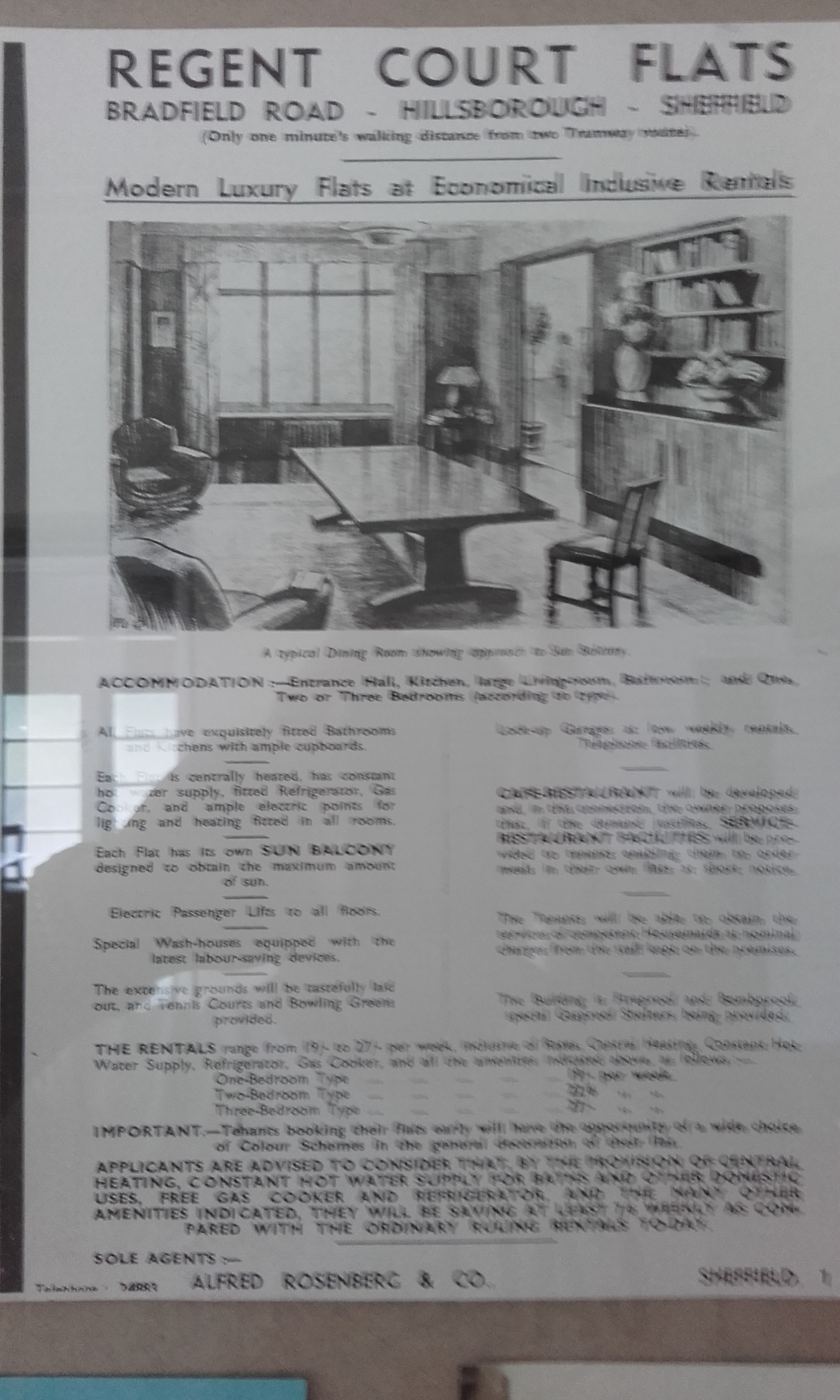
1930 info on Regent Court

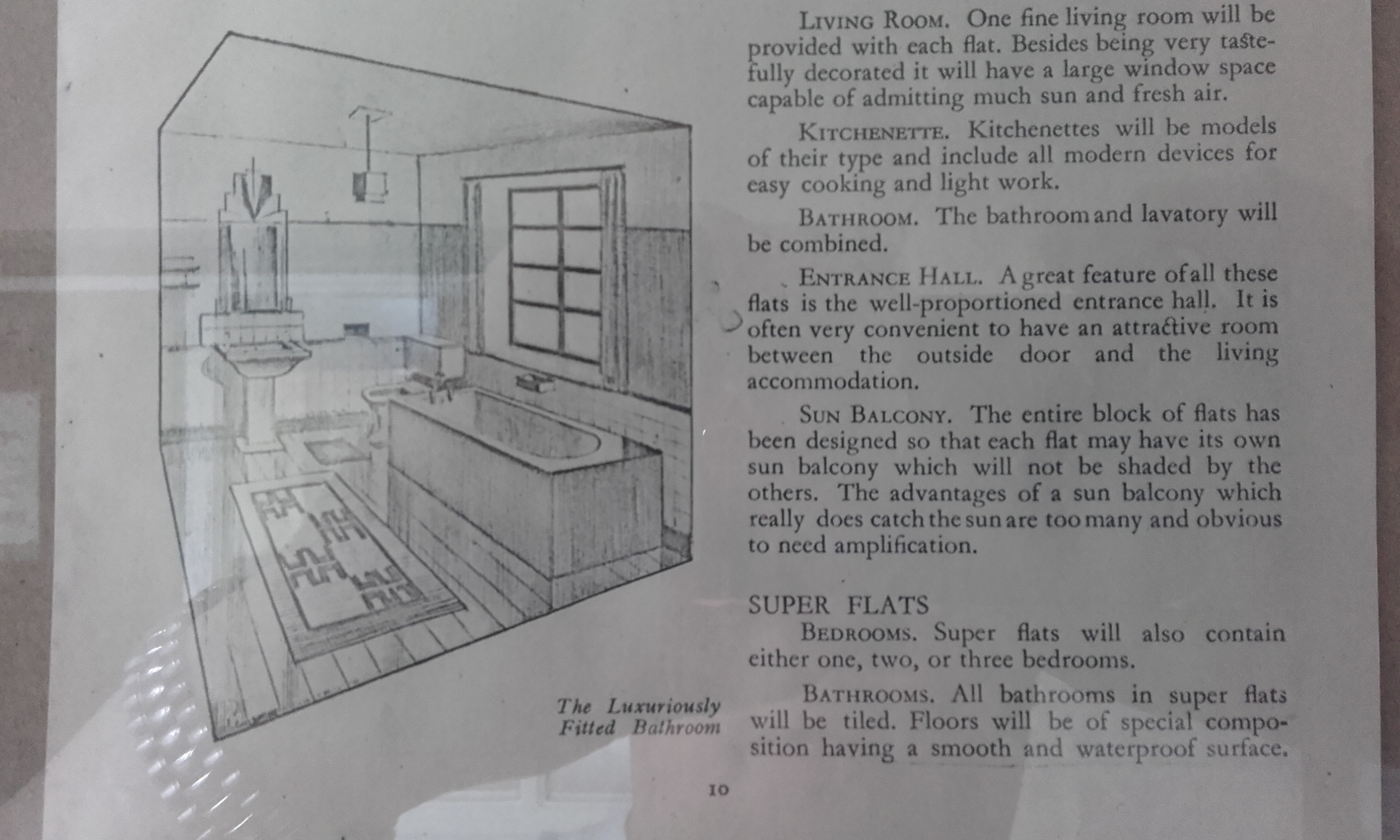
1930 info on Regent Court

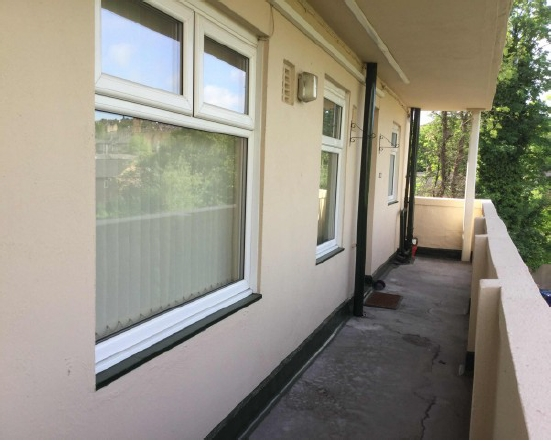
Access balcony

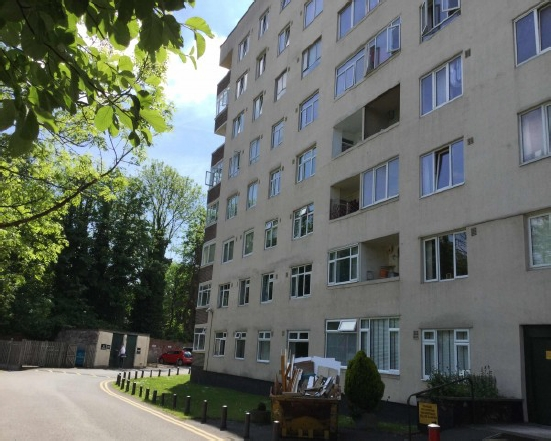
Rear view of the east wing of Regent Court

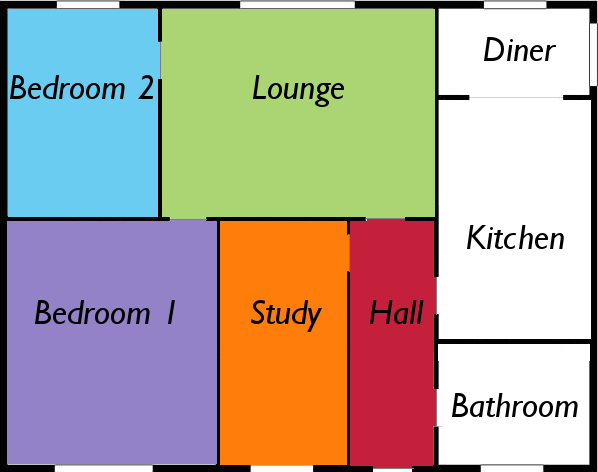
Typical layout of 3 bedroom flat on Regent Court

Regent Court is a block of flats in the Hillsborough district of Sheffield, England. It is located on Bradfield Road and is close to the Hillsborough shopping area and about half a mile from the Sheffield Wednesday football ground.

The building was designed in 1936 by Edgar Gardham and completed in 1937; it was the largest housing complex in the city at the time. Little is known of the architect and he designed a similar apartment block that was in Duke Street, Sheffield; this was demolished after the Second World War. While he also designed some housing for local authority development in other parts of the country, Regent Court was his most well known commission. According to an article published in the Sheffield Daily Independent on Saturday 13 November 1937, the vision and capital to undertake the building came from Armin Krausz who travelled extensively, making a thorough study of this kind of building. The site was a man-made swamp because of its vicinity to the Nether Owlerton Dam that had served the Nether Owlerton Wheel works which meant that the footings for the building were much deeper than originally planned. Despite lying in a working class area, the building boasted high specifications and rents. With styling loosely inspired by in the Streamline Moderne style, it was arguably the first workers' housing of the modern movement in the UK, preceding the purer Kensal House in London by a year.

Regent Court was built round three sides of a square with the open side facing south and is nine storeys high in the main block and seven storeys on the east and west wings with a central entrance leading to a communal lounge. The central block and each wing have a lift though these are quite small and slow; there is no service lift. In total, it comprises 202 flats, ranging from one to three bedrooms which are accessed along open balcony walkways. The heating at Regent Court is included with the rent as is the constant supply of hot water. Each flat was self contained and also had its own sun balcony; some of those have now been incorporated into the internal living space of the flat. Kitchenettes were equipped with modern devices and the bathrooms had both a toilet and a bath. There was an on site laundrette. Each flat owner has to contribute to the cost of upkeep/maintenance of the block and pay for things like the caretaker's wage, gardening, heating etc.

When originally built, Regent Court had a Tennis court and gardens, some lock up garages and a children's playground. In the 1930s this was fairly far sighted. The proposed swimming pool and bowling green were never built, perhaps due to cost and possibly the war.

An article written in the Sheffield Property Guide (Saturday 24 June 1972) stated that by the 1960s the flats had deteriorated to near slums and had new owners in 1971 who began renovating them. The renovations included the replacement of a leaky roof and the replacement of the coal fired heating system with an oil fired three boiler system; 3 new lifts were custom built at a cost of £30,000. All empty flats were refurbished, including rewiring and redecorating and then offered for sale. Regent Court was renovated again the late 1990s after years of neglect and it is now a popular residential location.

The flats were used in the film, The Full Monty and also on the artwork of Made in Sheffield, an album by Tony Christie (a former resident).
