= Hillsborough Barracks =

Historical Complex in England

- Sheffield
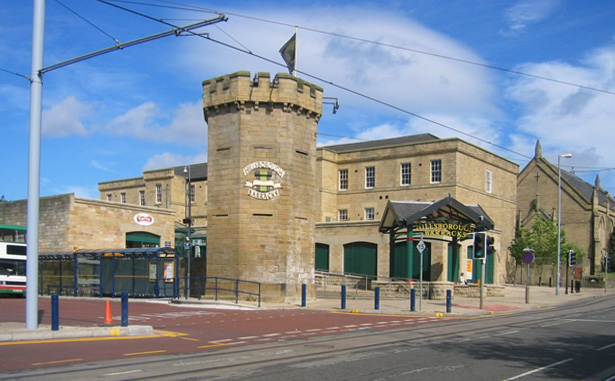
- Hillsborough Barracks

Site information
- Type: Barracks
- Owner: Ministry of Defence
- Operator: British Army

Location
- Location within South Yorkshire
- Coordinates: 53°24′05″N 01°29′41″W

Site history
- Built: 1848
- Built for: War Office
- In use: 1848–1930

Hillsborough Barracks is a walled complex of buildings between Langsett Road and Penistone Road in the Hillsborough District of Sheffield, South Yorkshire. Originally constructed as a military barracks, it is now the location of a major shopping precinct and transport hub at Hillsborough Interchange.

== Early history ==
The complex, which covers an area of circa 22 acres (89,000 m^{2}), dates from 1848, replacing an inadequate barracks at Hillfoot.

The barracks is divided into three terraces. The first (top) terrace faces on to what is now Langsett Road. This contained the Mess establishment, quarters for around 40 officers and a similar number of servants, and a chapel. This building has a length of about 354 feet (108 m) and a width and height of about 40 feet (12 m), is three storeys high and has a mixture of gothic and castellated styles. The other buildings of the barracks consisted of a large five-bedroomed house serving as the Garrison Commander’s Quarters outside the walls, a 58-patient two-storey hospital incorporating a barracks for RAMC personnel, a Dental Clinic and a facility for treating women, infantry soldiers' quarters, a clock tower building, with cavalry soldiers' quarters on the first floor and stabling for 260 horses on the ground floor (total accommodation for 918 NCO and other ranks). There was also a Fives Court, a Riding School, a school for 80 children and accommodation for the schoolmistress, married quarters flats for 50 families provided outside the walls, a Gun Shed housing six Field guns, the Barracks Store with living quarters for the Barracks Sergeant, a Guard Room incorporating a Police Room, Detention Cells, and an exercise yard, a Vehicle Shed (built in 1903) which could house 26 motor cars, a Veterinary Infirmary large enough to house 18 horses, a Granary, four cookhouses and various workshops.

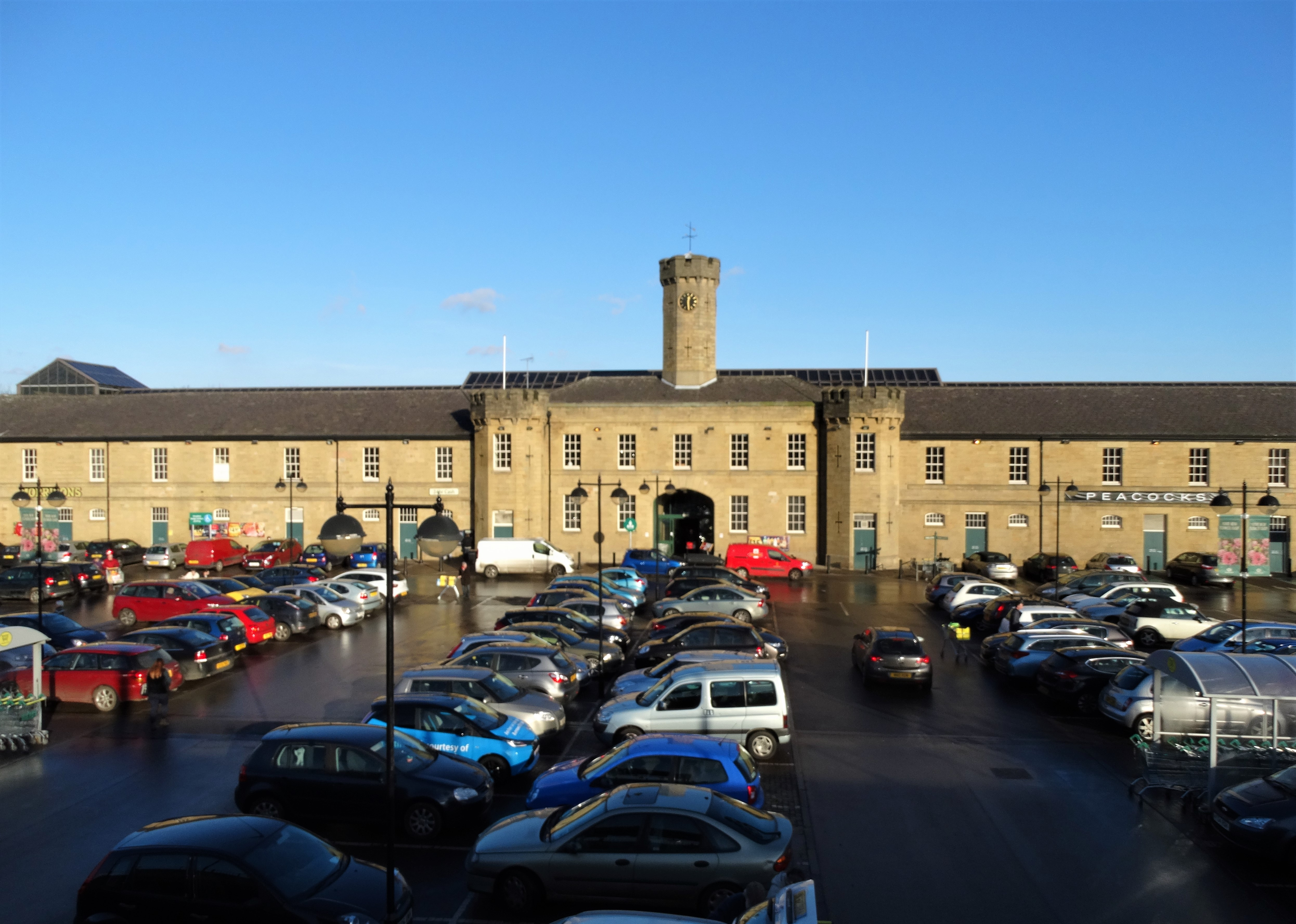
Cavalry quarters

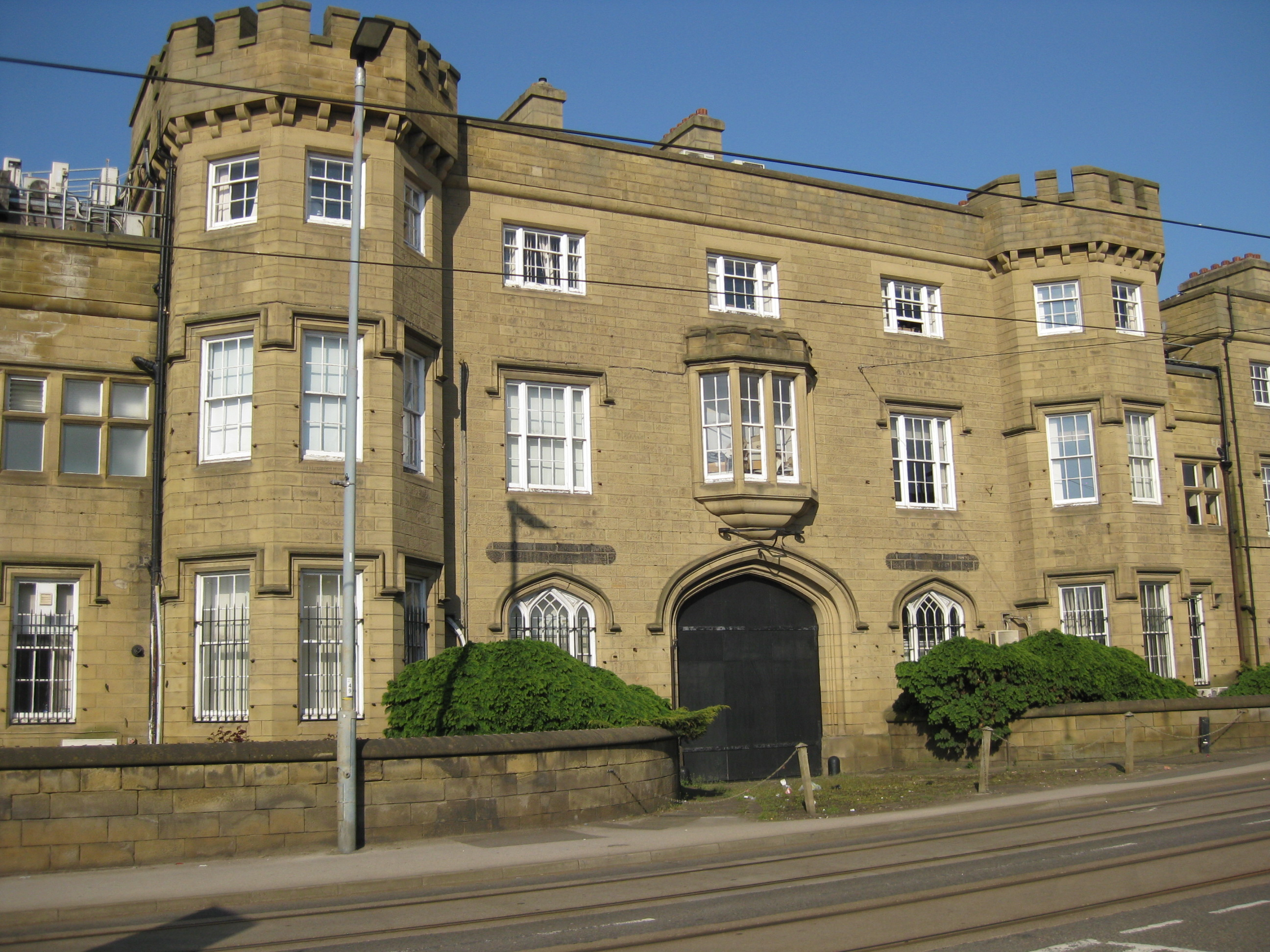
Main building, Langsett Road

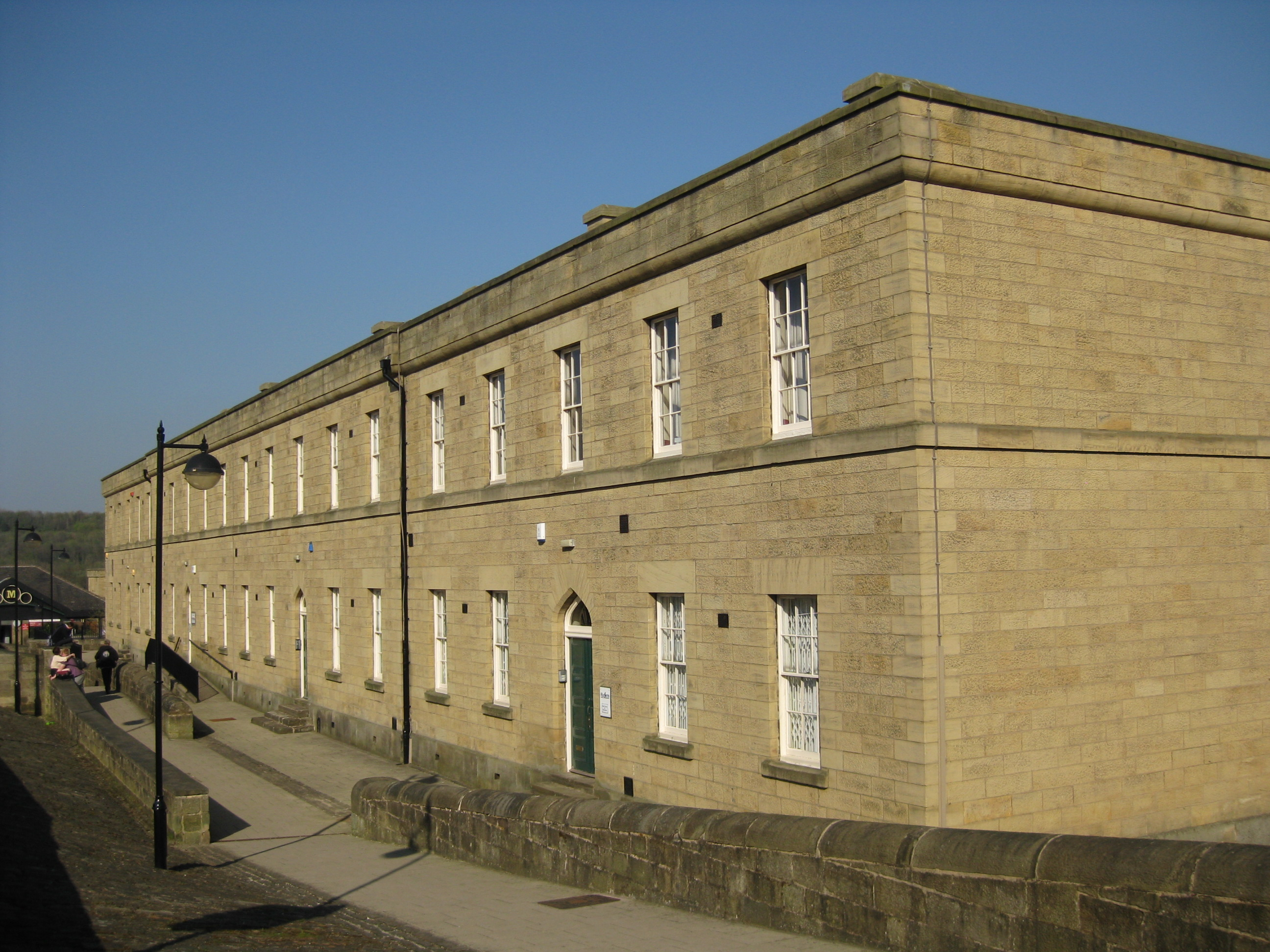
Infantry Quarters

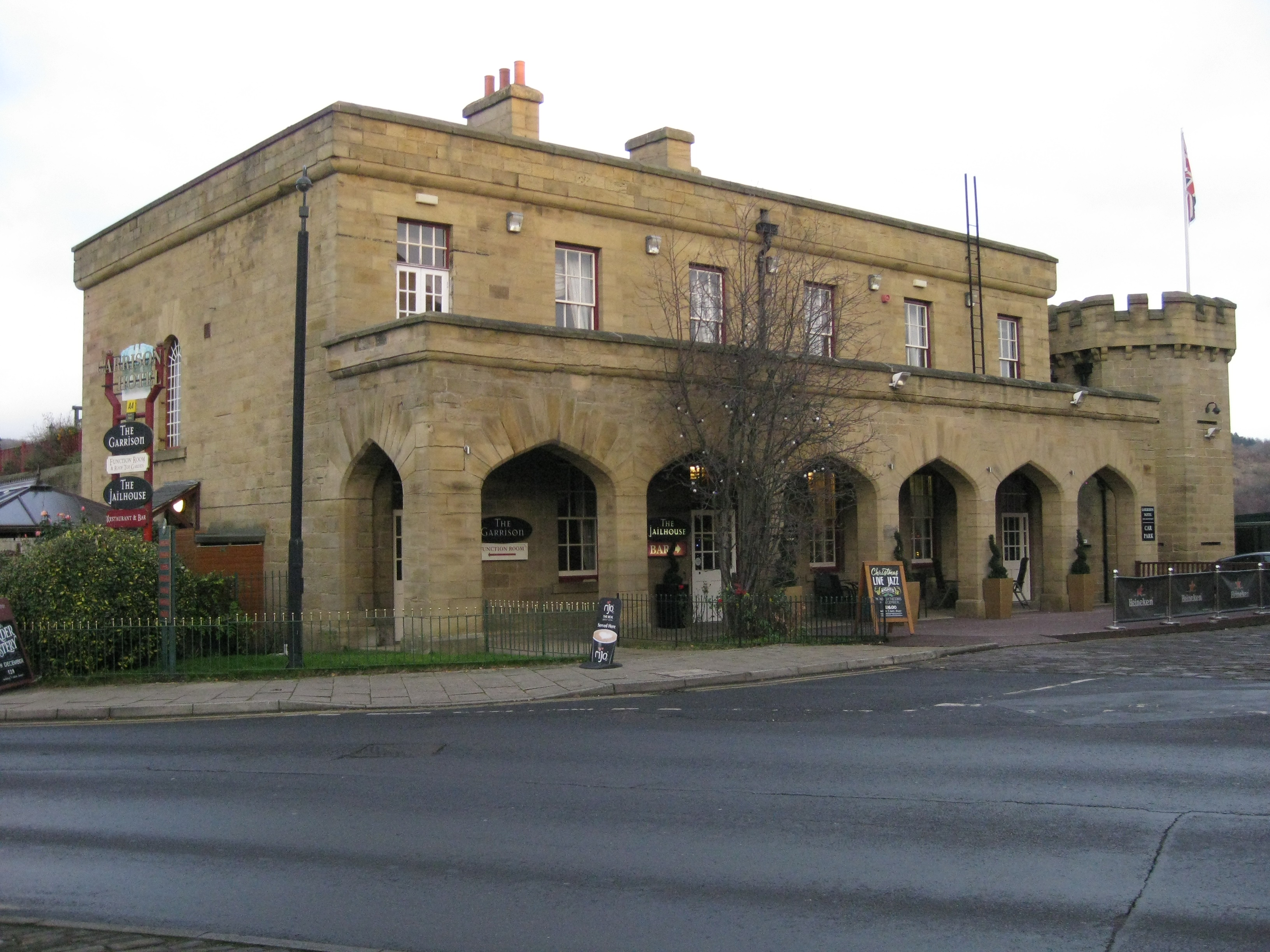
Guardhouse

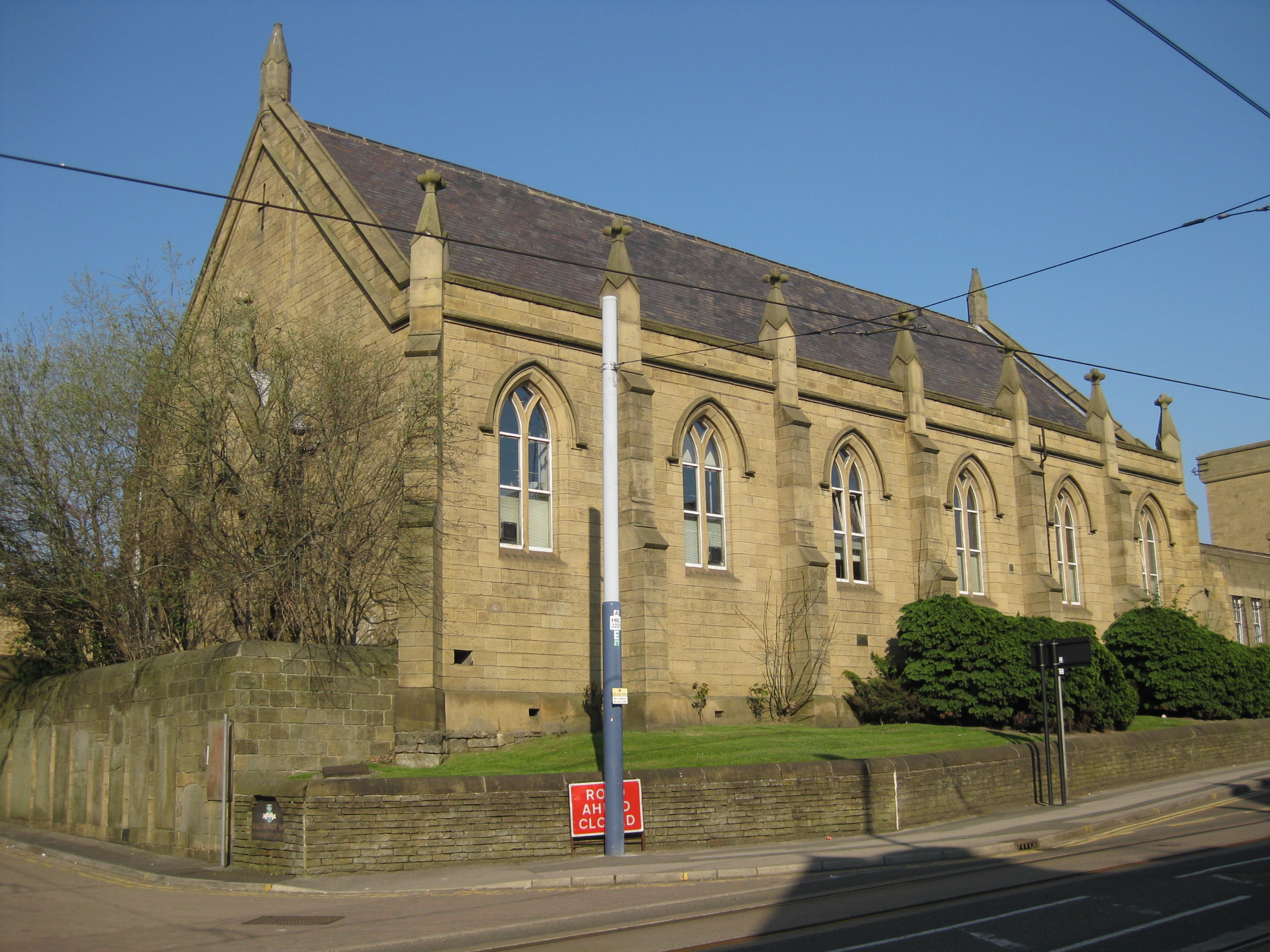
Chapel

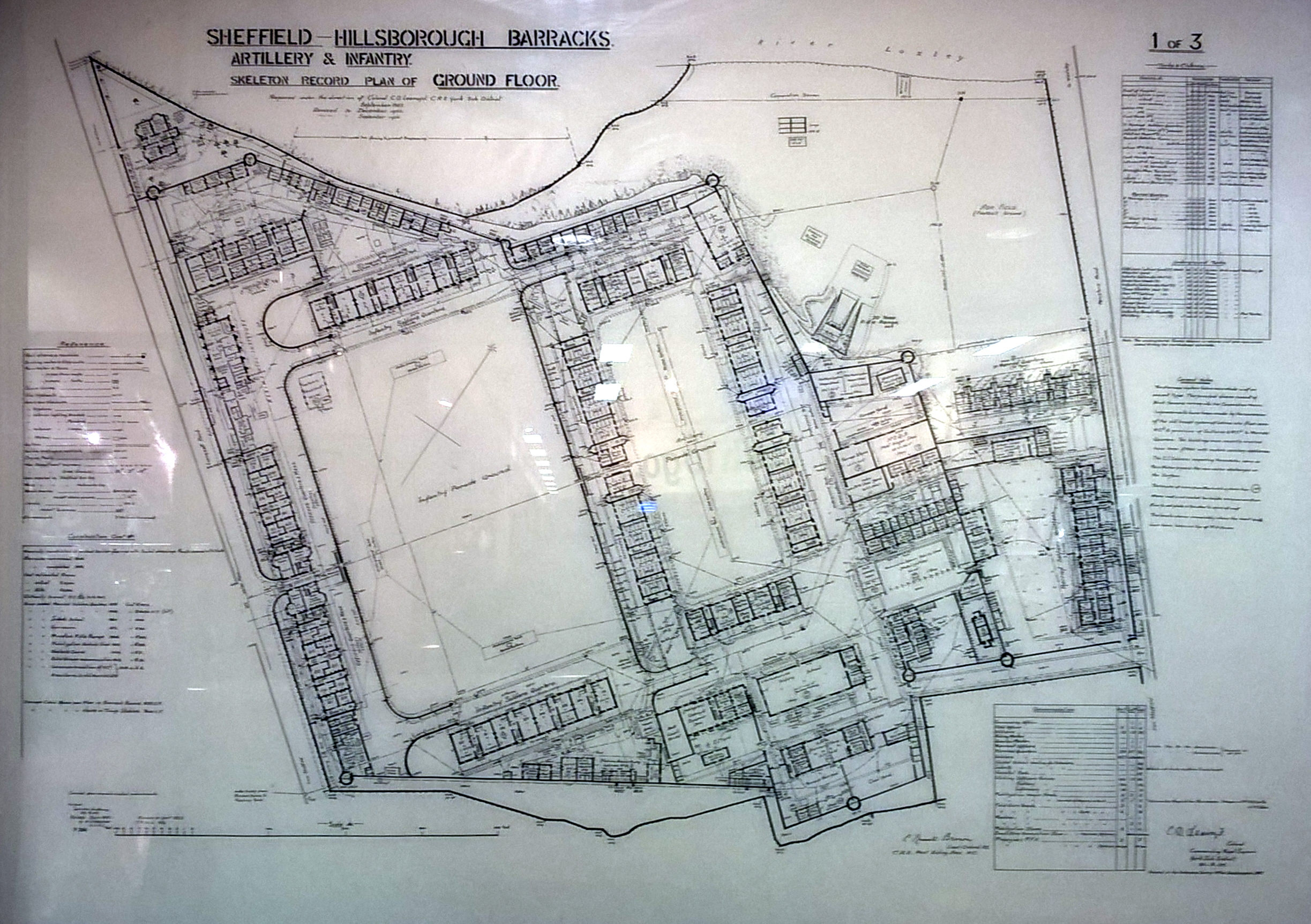
Site plan

On the northern side of the Barracks runs the River Loxley. On the night of Friday 11 March 1864 the ill-fated Dale Dyke Dam further up the Loxley Valley at Bradfield burst causing the Great Sheffield Flood and the resulting flood waters breached a stone wall that was three feet thick. The water rose to the height of twelve feet outside the window of Sergeant Foulds' quarters and drowned two of his children.

On 26 July 1932, an auction was held on the instructions of the War Department by Eadon & Lockwood at Sheffield. However, when bidding reached only £12,000, the auction was terminated and the Barracks withdrawn from sale. In October of that year, the complex was sold to Burdall’s Ltd, a manufacturing chemist noted for its gravy salt, and it became known as Burdall’s Buildings.

== Redevelopment ==
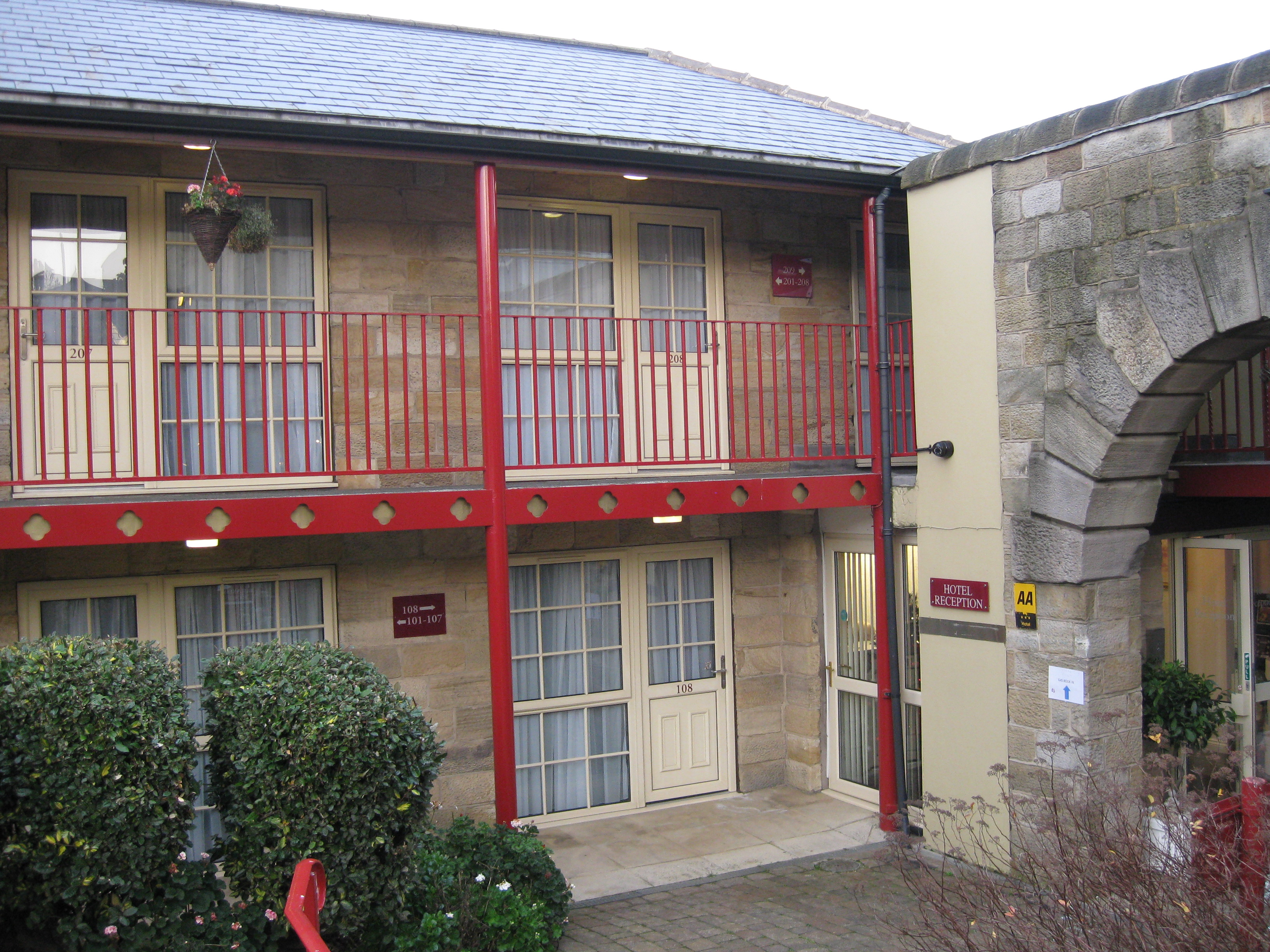
former cells now hotel rooms

A major redevelopment of the site was embarked upon in the late 1980s. The result is the large retail and business complex seen today, in which all the surviving structures have been cleaned of the grime from Sheffield's industrial past. The focus of the complex is the Morrisons Supermarket covering the old Artillery Parade Ground, which has been roofed for the purpose and is fronted by the clock-towered stable block. The old Infantry Parade Ground is now a two-storey car park between the Stable Block and the old Officers' Mess (now the headquarters for Sheffield Insulations Ltd). The old football ground and rifle range are now a B&Q DIY Superstore. The Married Quarters which served as flats until the end of the 1970s were demolished and the area is now a McDonald's Drive-through Restaurant. The Garrison Commander’s House was demolished and its site is now covered with a garage and petrol station. The old guard room is now the Garrison Hotel and Jailhouse Bar.
