= Liquorice allsorts =

British confection

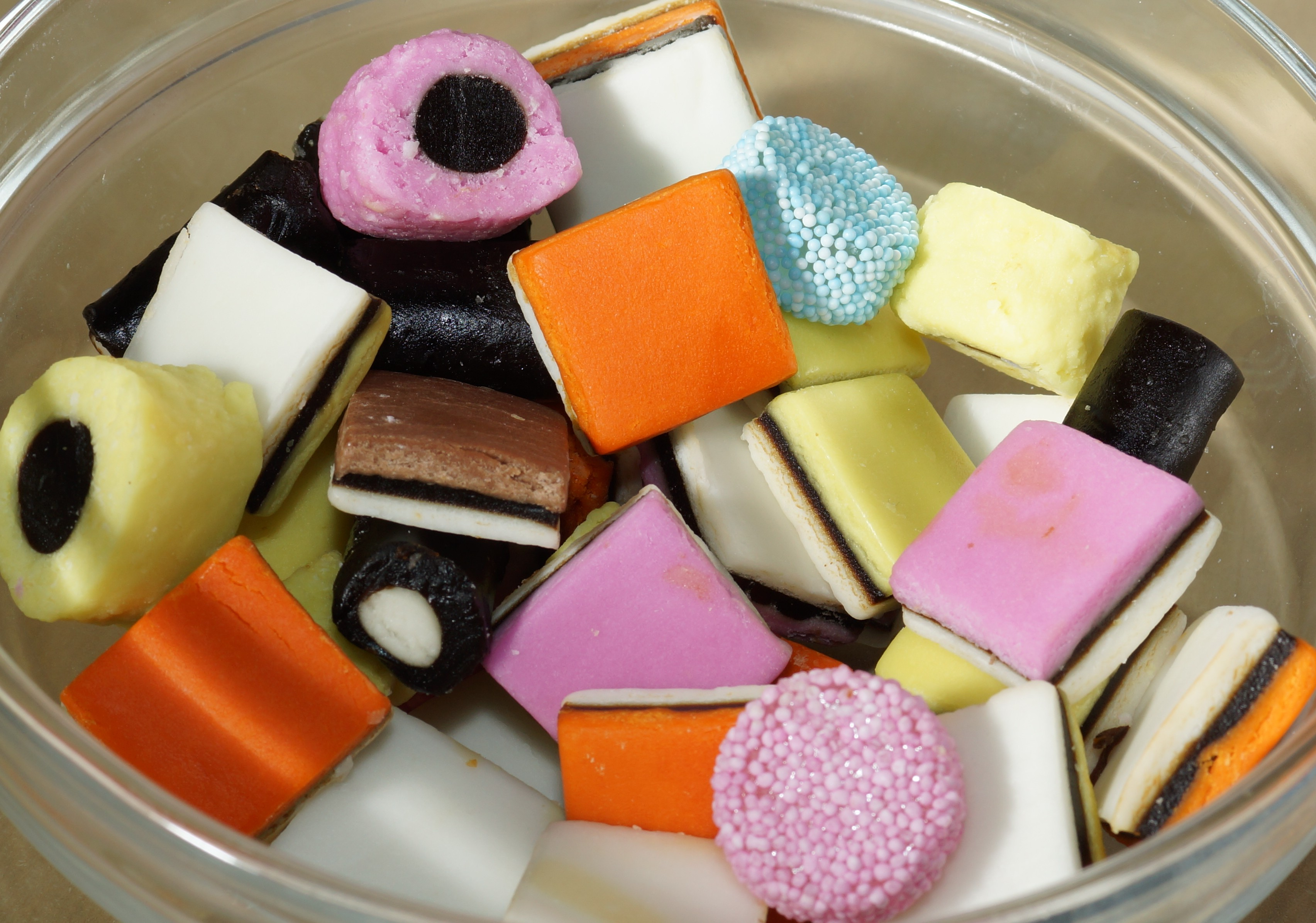
- Type: Confectionery
- Place of origin: United Kingdom
- Region or state: Sheffield
- Created by: Geo. Bassett & Co
- Main ingredients: Liquorice, sugar, coconut, aniseed jelly, fruit flavourings, gelatine

Liquorice allsorts are liquorice confectionery sold as an assortment. Made of liquorice, sugar, coconut, aniseed jelly, fruit flavourings, and gelatine, they were first produced in Sheffield, England, by Geo. Bassett & Co Ltd.

Allsorts are produced by many companies around the world, but are most popular in Europe, especially Britain and the Netherlands, where they are called Engelse drop, meaning English liquorice. They are also common in Scandinavia, where they are called Engelsk konfekt or Lakridskonfekt, and in Finland, where they are called englanninlakritsi. South African confectionery giant Beacon produces substantial quantities of the product, selling it locally and exporting it to Australia, Canada and Portugal.

== History ==
In 1899, Charlie Thompson, a Bassett's sales representative, supposedly tripped over and dropped a tray of samples he was showing a client in Leicester, mixing up the various sweets. After he scrambled to re-arrange them, the client was intrigued by the new creation. The company began to mass-produce the allsorts as they have done since then.

Bassett's have released two varieties of allsorts that do not feature any liquorice. Fruit Allsorts feature mixed-fruit flavoured sweets, while Dessert Allsorts have flavours such as apple tart and lemon cheesecake. Both retain the shapes and textures of the original sweet. Red allsorts, with fruit-flavoured liquorice, were briefly released in the late 1990s, discontinued and later reintroduced to the UK with flavours including Blueberry Cube, Strawberry Check and a red liquorice "Betty Bassett".

== Names ==
The original items mixed by Thompson were "chips, rocks, buttons, nuggets, plugs and twists". It is not clear which, if any, correspond to Bassett's traditional allsorts, though certainly newer items have been introduced, such as the Bertie.

The round jelly sweet, coated in (usually pink or blue) hard sugar sprinkles, is called a "spog".

== Bertie Bassett ==
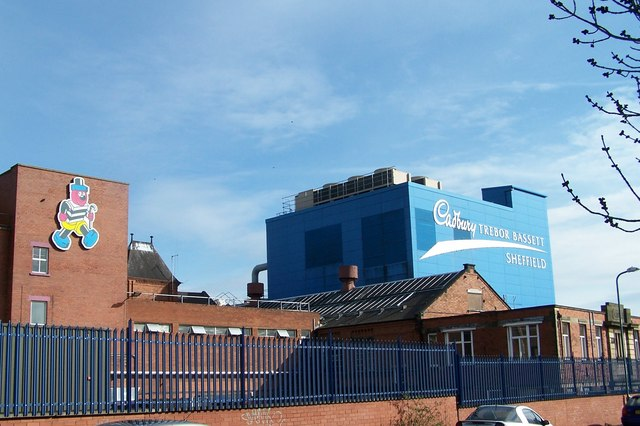
Bertie Bassett on the wall to left at formerly Bassett's factory in Owlerton, Sheffield

The Bassett's company mascot is Bertie Bassett, a figure made up of liquorice allsorts, which has become a part of British popular culture. The character's origins lie with advertising copywriter Frank Regan, who used the sweets and some pipe-cleaners to construct what was the original version of Bertie. One of the sweets in the modern-day allsorts mix is a liquorice figure shaped like Bertie.

The Doctor Who television serial episode The Happiness Patrol featured a villain called the Kandy Man, who was made from liquorice allsorts and was thought by some to resemble Bertie Bassett. Although an internal investigation concluded that the programme had not infringed on Bassett's trademark, the BBC promised Bassett's that the Kandy Man would not appear again.

In the 2001 satirical comedy film Mike Bassett: England Manager, the figure of Bertie Bassett appears in a short scene on a newspaper with the headline "Bassett's Allsorts".

As a publicity stunt, Bassett's staged a mock wedding between actors dressed as Bertie and Betty Bassett, another character composed of confectionery, at its Sheffield factory, in February 2009.

== See also ==
- Dolly mixture
