= Hillsborough Park =

Park in Sheffield, England

Coordinates: 53.4080°N 1.5014°W

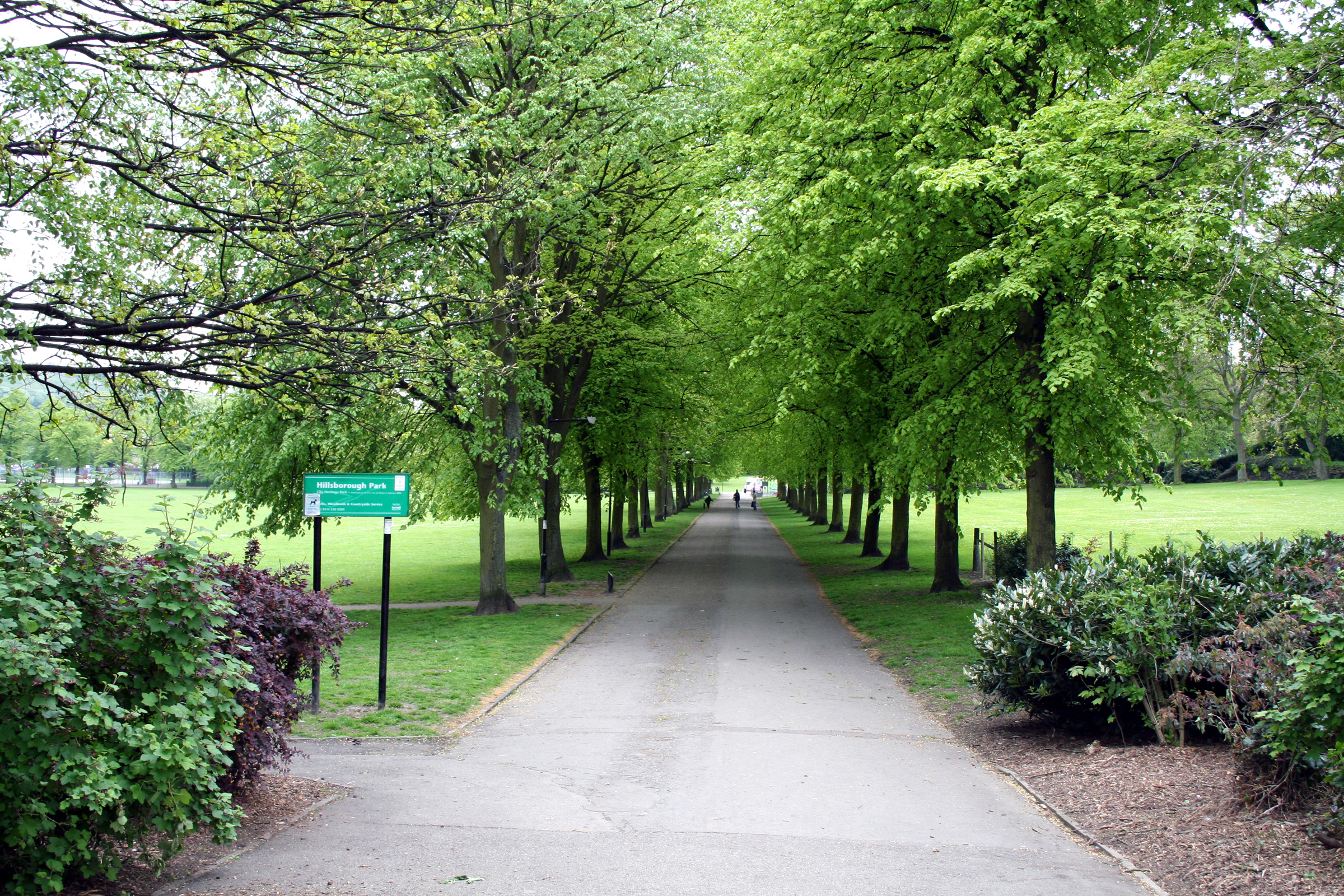
A view of the park

Hillsborough Park is a large (49 acres (20 ha)) parkland area in Hillsborough, Sheffield, South Yorkshire, England. It is situated three miles north-west of the city centre. It is owned by Sheffield City Council and is one of the 13 designated "City Parks".

== History ==
In 1890 Sheffield Corporation paid £15,000 for 50 acres of parkland belonging to the Hillsborough Hall estate of J. W. Dixon junior which was being auctioned off. At that time the land lay outside the city boundary in the parish of Ecclesfield. Initial development work utilised unemployed labour and included enlarging the lake making it suitable for boating, erecting new boundary walls and public toilets as well as carrying out extensive drainage work. An impressive domed, circular bandstand was built just above the lake, (photograph on Picture Sheffield) where open air concerts were given, the bandstand stood until the 1950s when it was demolished. In 1901 boundary extensions brought the park within the city and it was officially opened on 8 August 1892.

The Ecclesfield Farmers Agricultural Show continued to use the parks facilities in its early years after an agreement was made with the Corporation. The park hosted the Great Yorkshire Show five times before it found a permanent site at Harrogate in 1951, the last occasion being in 1923. The 66th edition of the show which was held at the park in 1903 drew 54,913 visitors who paid gate money of £3,497. During World War II large areas of the park were used for wartime activities, allotments were created for food production, one area housed a barrage balloon site while air raid shelters were dug near Hawksley Avenue.

The park was the venue for The Sheffield Show from 1965, the show consisted of stalls, fair rides and music amongst other attractions and continued through the 1970s and 80s before it moved to Graves Park. Sheffield Mayfest took place at the park from the early 2000s to 2012, it was similar to the Sheffield Show although more oriented towards young adults with pop acts such as Blazin' Squad and Lemar appearing. In 2018 Hillsborough park became the venue for the main stage of the Tramlines Festival, an annual three day music event attended by more than 90,000 people over the weekend in July 2019.

The whole of the park and some of the surrounding streets fall within the Hillsborough Park Conservation Area, created in 1993 it highlights several areas of the park which are of special interest. These are the Grade II listed Hillsborough House, as well as the east and west lodges which are situated on Penistone Road and Middlewood Road respectively, both the lodges are Grade II listed and date from the early part of the 19th century. The parks distinctive boundary walls and railings are mentioned as are the row of Poplar trees on the south side of the park.

== Features ==
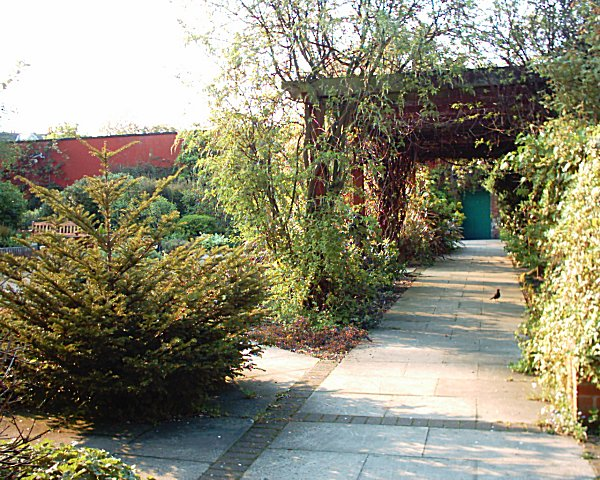
Hillsborough's Walled Garden

Hillsborough Park features a fishing lake, a bowling green with pavilion, a walled garden and a playground. The bowling green and pavilion (Hillsborough Pavilion) are undergoing regenerative work to extend the pavilion, to make it available for further use. Much work has been put into the walled garden to bring it to its present state with planting to replace dead plants.

The park has previously been home to Sheffield F.C. and now hosts the home matches of Hillsborough Hawks rugby league club. It is also the home of the Hallamshire Harriers Sheffield running club and the venue of Hillsborough parkrun. There is a Civil War reenactment every year as well as the Sheffield Mayfest. Hillsborough Park tram stop, located on the Yellow route of the South Yorkshire Supertram network, opened in 1995.

2020 saw plans announced for three new facilities within the park. The Hillsborough All Wheeled Bike Park has been granted planning permission and is to be built next to the tennis courts close to Penistone Road, it is planned to be completed by spring 2021. Also opened in 2021 were a set of public facilities called Gathering Ground, established by Age UK with funding from the National Lottery Heritage Fund. This included a cafe developed from the former Hillsborough Park Coach House, a makers' shed and the redeveloped bowling green pavilion.

Work started in September 2020 to upgrade the existing children's playground within the park. The six-week programme saw the installation of a new ‘Snakes Head’ slide and an activity trail. Subsequently the current embankment slide will be replaced by an embankment climbing feature, there will also be a new agility trail. Fundraising for Phase 2 of the work that will improve the rest of the playground will start soon in conjunction with the Friends of Hillsborough Park.

In 2022, a £330,000 pump track was installed, financed by Sheffield City Council, Access Sport, Move More and Sheffield Hallam University.

August 2025 saw the opening of a new activity area and café in the eastern part of the park adjacent to Penistone Road on the site of the old tennis courts. The area is a joint venture between Sheffield City Council and Courtside CIC, it is situated alongside the pump track and includes:

- Three full sized and resurfaced tennis courts, these are floodlit and include netball markings.
- A nine hole “Sheffield themed” Miniature golf course.
- Two covered padel courts.
- The Courtside café with indoor and outdoor seating and toilets. There is also a central space for exercise, spectating and socialising.

Preceding station	South Yorkshire Supertram	Following station
Hillsborough Interchange towards Meadowhall Interchange	Yellow Line	Leppings Lane towards Middlewood
