= Hillsborough House =

English country house

Coordinates: 53.4069°N 1.5025°W

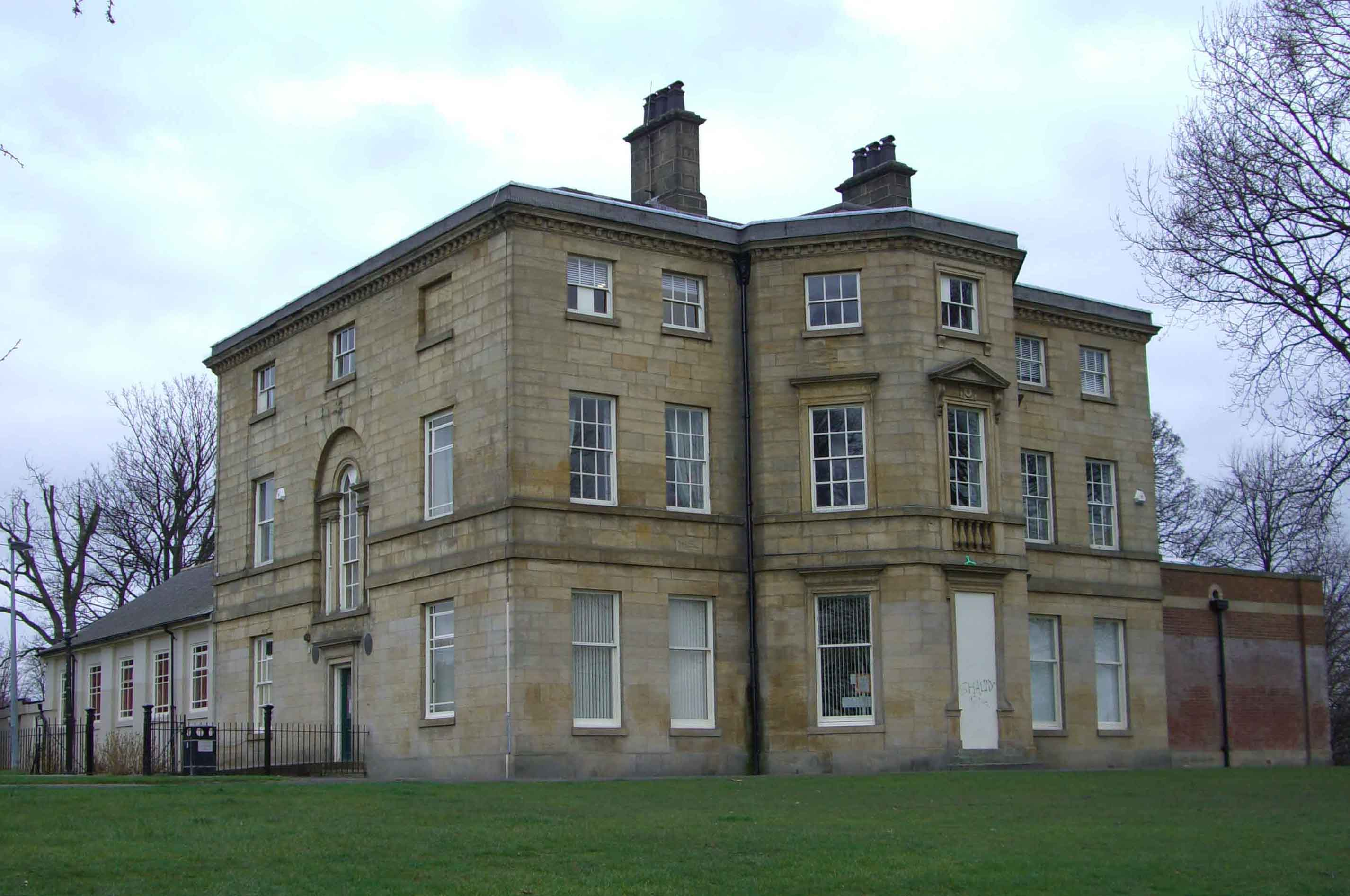
Hillsborough House, now Hillsborough library. The single storied junior library is on the left hand side.

Hillsborough House, later called Hillsborough Hall, is a large, stone-built mansion constructed in the Adam style in the latter part of the 18th century. It stands 2 1/2 miles north-west of the centre of Sheffield at grid reference SK331901 in the suburb of Hillsborough within Hillsborough Park, a council-owned public recreational area. For 124 years the house was a private dwelling, but since 1906 it has housed the Hillsborough branch library. It is a Grade II listed building as are the coach house and stables which stand 22 yards (20 m) north-west of the main house.

== Private dwelling ==
Hillsborough House was built in 1779 as a dwelling for Thomas Steade (1728–1793) and his wife Meliscent, who had been living 250 yards to the east in Burrowlee House. The Steades were a family of local landowners whose history went back to at least the 14th century. When built, the house stood in rural countryside well outside the Sheffield boundary. Steade named his new residence in honour of the Earl of Hillsborough, an eminent politician of the period and a patron of the Steades.

Stead acquired more land and the grounds eventually had an area of 103 acres (42 ha). The grounds were much more extensive than the present Hillsborough Park, stretching north to the current junction of Leppings Lane and Penistone Road, and included the site on which Hillsborough Stadium now stands. They extended further south encompassing the site now occupied by the Hillsborough Arena. The grounds had areas given over to agriculture but there was also extensive parkland featuring a lake, two lodges, and a tree-lined avenue. There was also a walled garden, which still exists today, that provided fresh produce for the house’s kitchens.

Broughton Steade inherited the house upon his father's death in 1793 but sold it in 1801 to John Rimington Wilson of the Broomhead Hall family. In 1838 it was sold again to John Rodgers, the owner of a well-known local cutlery firm. Rodgers renamed his residence Hillsborough Hall as he thought this better reflected the property's significance. Between 1852 and 1860 the Hall was occupied by the family of Edward Bury (1794–1858), the pioneer locomotive builder and part founder of the Sheffield steel firm of Bedford, Burys & Co. A plaque by the front door of the present-day building commemorates the Bury family's residency. In 1860 Ernest Benzon, a German-born financial advisor, bought the Hall.

Five years later, Benzon sold the house to James Willis Dixon, son of the founder of the well-known Sheffield silver-and-metalsmiths firm, James Dixon & Sons. Dixon made considerable alterations and redecorated the property. Archives record that at that time there were six servants' bedrooms with a nursery on the second floor and five family bedrooms on the first floor. When Dixon died in 1876, his extensive library of over 1,000 books was sold. Dixon's art collection, which included works by Rembrandt, Rubens, and Watteau, was also auctioned.

The death of J. W. Dixon junior in 1890 caused the hall and its grounds to be divided into 14 lots and auctioned off. Sheffield Corporation (now Sheffield City Council) bought Lot 1, which included the hall and the surrounding 50 acres (200,000 m^{2}) of land. A northern section of the estate on the far side of the River Don was sold to Sheffield Wednesday Football Club which needed a new home ground as the lease on their Olive Grove ground had expired. Lands on the western side of the estate were sold to build Hillsborough Trinity Methodist Church and to accommodate new housing as the city of Sheffield expanded. The streets that these new houses were built on were named Dixon, Wynyard, Willis, Lennox, and Shepperson, all names connected to the Dixon family.

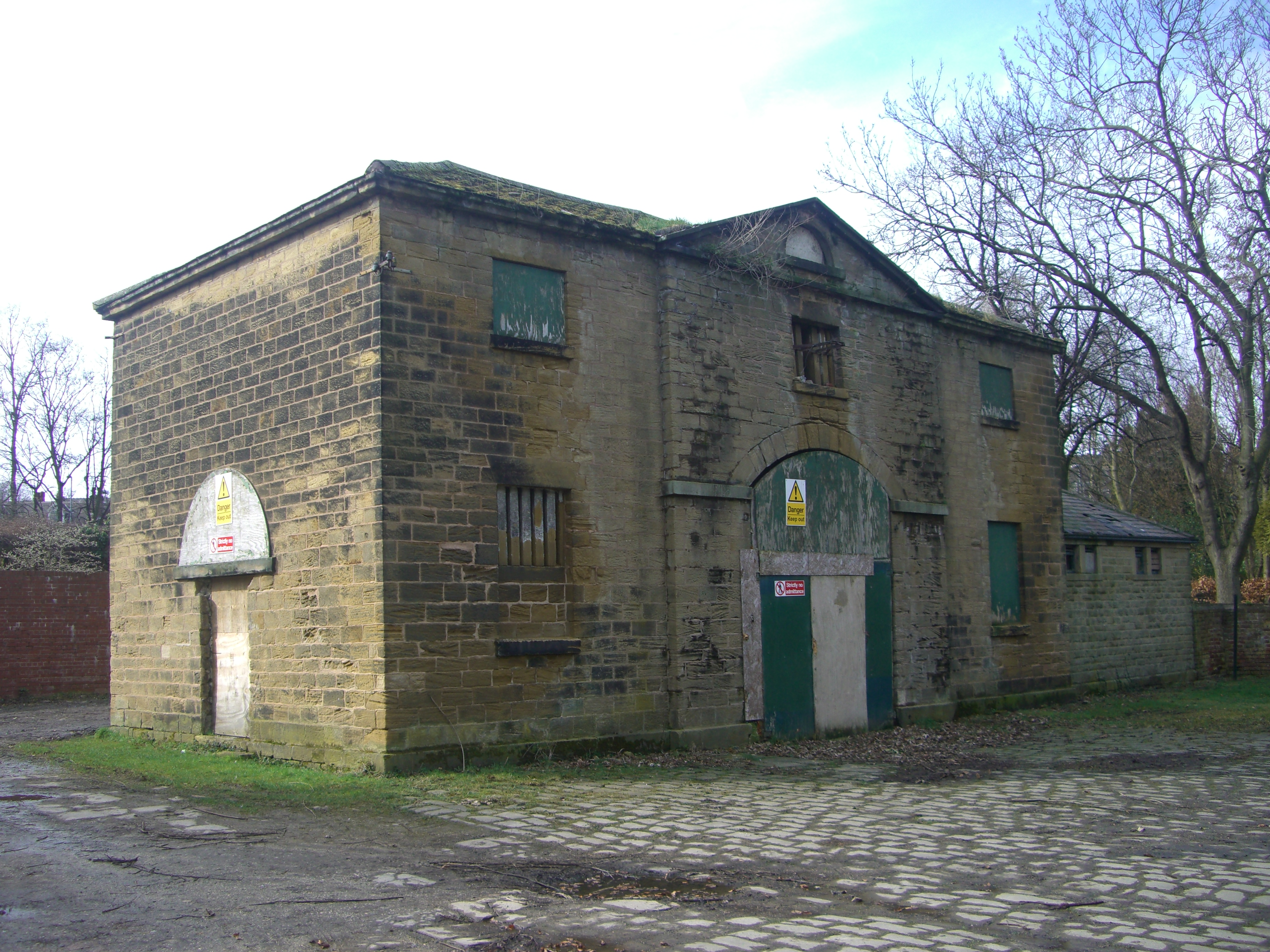
The coach house and stables before restoration in 2013.

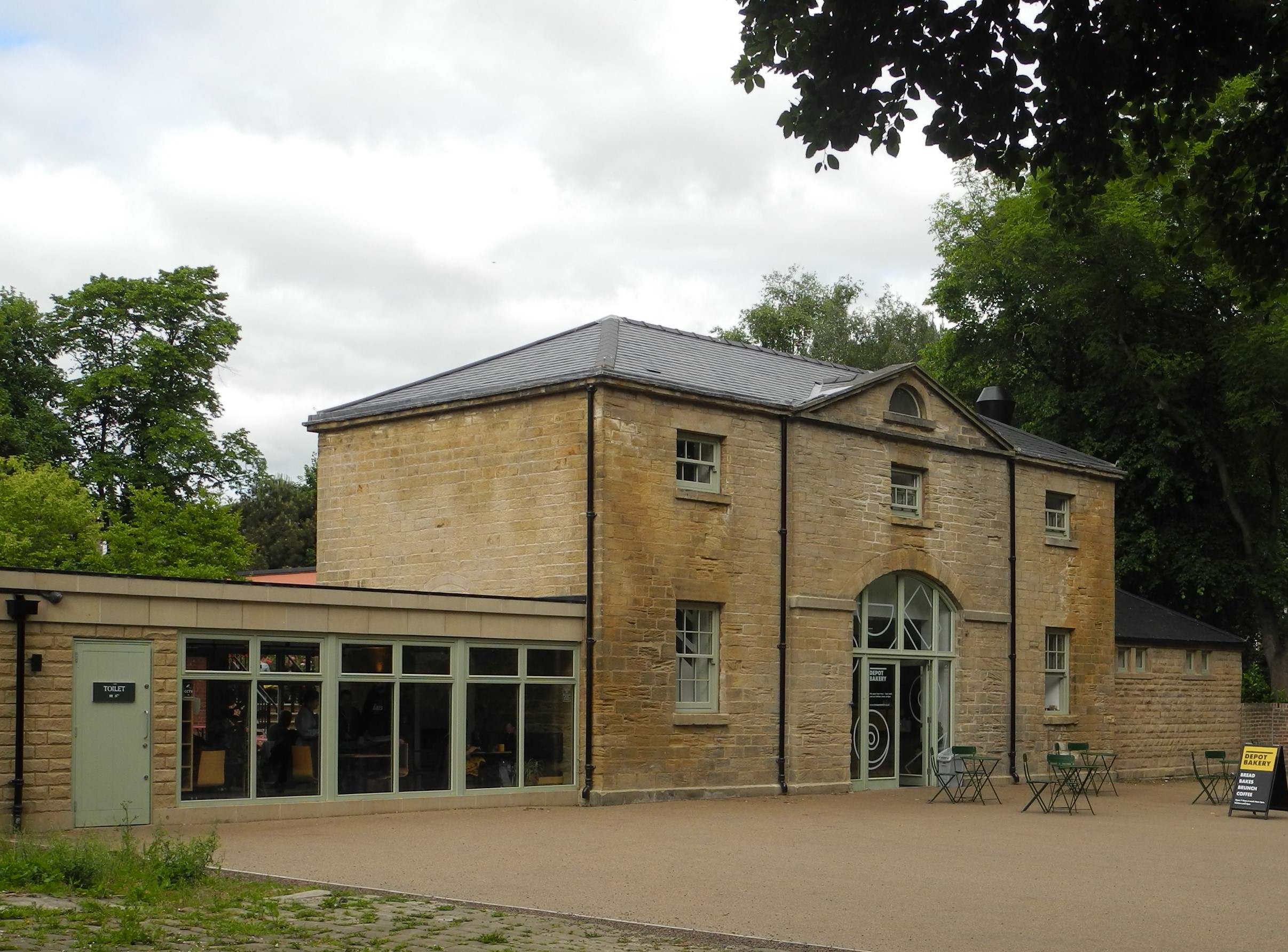
The building restored as a dementia friendly cafe in 2022.

=== Coach house and stables ===
These are also listed buildings which were constructed at the same time as the main house. After the Dixons sold the house in 1890, they were used for storage by the local council for many years. Recently they have fallen into a state of disrepair and have been unused and boarded up for many years. In 2012 Sheffield City Council put the coach house and stable block up for sale with a view to them being restored and renovated by the private sector and turned into a café and restaurant facility (and possible wedding venue). In April 2018, the charity Age UK put forward plans to revitalise the coach house by turning it into a café and community centre for elderly people. The charity received £14,000 for a feasibility study from the Heritage Lottery Fund and the Architectural Heritage Fund. The final bill for the renovation was expected to be around £500,000 at that time if the plans were feasible.

=== Restoration ===
On 29 June 2020 The National Lottery Heritage Fund awarded local charity Age UK Sheffield £581,500 to restore the derelict Old Coach House building and turn it into a new community dementia friendly café. The nearby Potting Shed to be renovated as a creative Makers’ Shed.

Restoration work began in the spring of 2021, with Corinna Pearce, Marketing Co-ordinator at Age UK Sheffield, saying: "The Coach House building was derelict, infested with pigeons, and unsafe. In 2018, it had to be propped up to stop it collapsing and there were problems with the rear wall. The process involved structural repairs to the original structure and we made sure to respect that because it is a listed building. It does have new flooring, a new roof and new internal fittings, as well as the conservatory which is brand new. We made sure to preserve the features, such as the beams above the first floor which have been repaired and restored". The building was officially opened on 14 March 2022. In total, the project cost around £1 million, with additional funding to the lottery money coming from Age UK Sheffield who contributed £100,000 and over £200,000 coming in partner funding. Additional local fundraising also contributed to the final cost.

== Hillsborough Library ==
In 1906 the main house opened as Hillsborough library, although there were suggestions that it could be an art gallery and museum. The surrounding 50 acres (200,000 m^{2}) of land purchased by the council became Hillsborough Park. Hillsborough’s first librarian was Henry A. Valantine; his salary amounted to £111. In 1929 a single storey extension was added to accommodate a new junior library. In the 1940s and 1950s a maternity and child welfare clinic was located on the first floor. In 1978 the building was found to have dry and wet rot and was closed for repairs. The rooms on the library’s upper floors are used by local councillors and Members of Parliament for surgeries. Former politician Roy Hattersley, who was brought up in Hillsborough, had this to say in his autobiography A Yorkshire Boyhood: “The library remained our constant joy. It was part of our lives, a home from home housed in what had once been a mansion owned by a local worthy”.

== Address ==
Middlewood Road, Sheffield S6 4HD
