= List of United Kingdom tramcar stock =

Over the years of trams and tramways, there have been many designs of tramcars for use on the tramways, ranging from historical locomotives pulling wagons, to some of the preserved cars such as the Pantograph, Coronation, Balloon or Standard cars at the National Tramway Museum or at the Blackpool Tramway. During the 1990s and early 2000s there was a renaissance in UK tramways with several new networks opening and expanding, leading to a second generation of modern tramcars such as the Bombardier Incentro and the AnsaldoBreda T-68 and T-69s, as well as Sheffield's Supertram.

== Modern Tramcar Stock ==
- Blackpool Tramway
1. Bombardier Flexity 2
- Edinburgh Tramway
1. CAF Urbos 3
- Manchester Metrolink
1. AnsaldoBreda T-68 all withdrawn from service
2. Bombardier M5000
- West Midlands Metro
1. AnsaldoBreda T-69 all withdrawn from service
2. CAF Urbos 3
- Nottingham Express Transit
1. Bombardier Incentro
2. Alstom Citadis
- Sheffield Supertram
1. Siemens-Duewag Supertram
2. Stadler Citylink tram-trains
- South London Tramlink
1. Bombardier CR4000
2. Stadler Variobahn

== Preserved Tramcar Stock ==
- Blackpool Tramway
1. Standard
2. English Electric Railcoach
3. Boat
4. Balloon
5. Brush Railcoach
6. Coronation
7. Progress Twin Set
8. OMO
9. Jubilee
10. Centenary
11. Illuminated Feature Cars
- National Tramway Museum
1. Blackpool Conduit
2. Blackpool Dreadnought
3. Blackpool Toastrack
4. Blackpool Standard
5. Blackpool Pantograph
6. Blackpool Boat
7. Blackpool Balloon
8. Blackpool Brush Railcoach
9. Blackpool OMO
10. Blackpool Jubilee
11. Blackpool and Fleetwood Rack
12. Blackpool and Fleetwood Box
