= Brecknell Willis =

British electrical engineering company

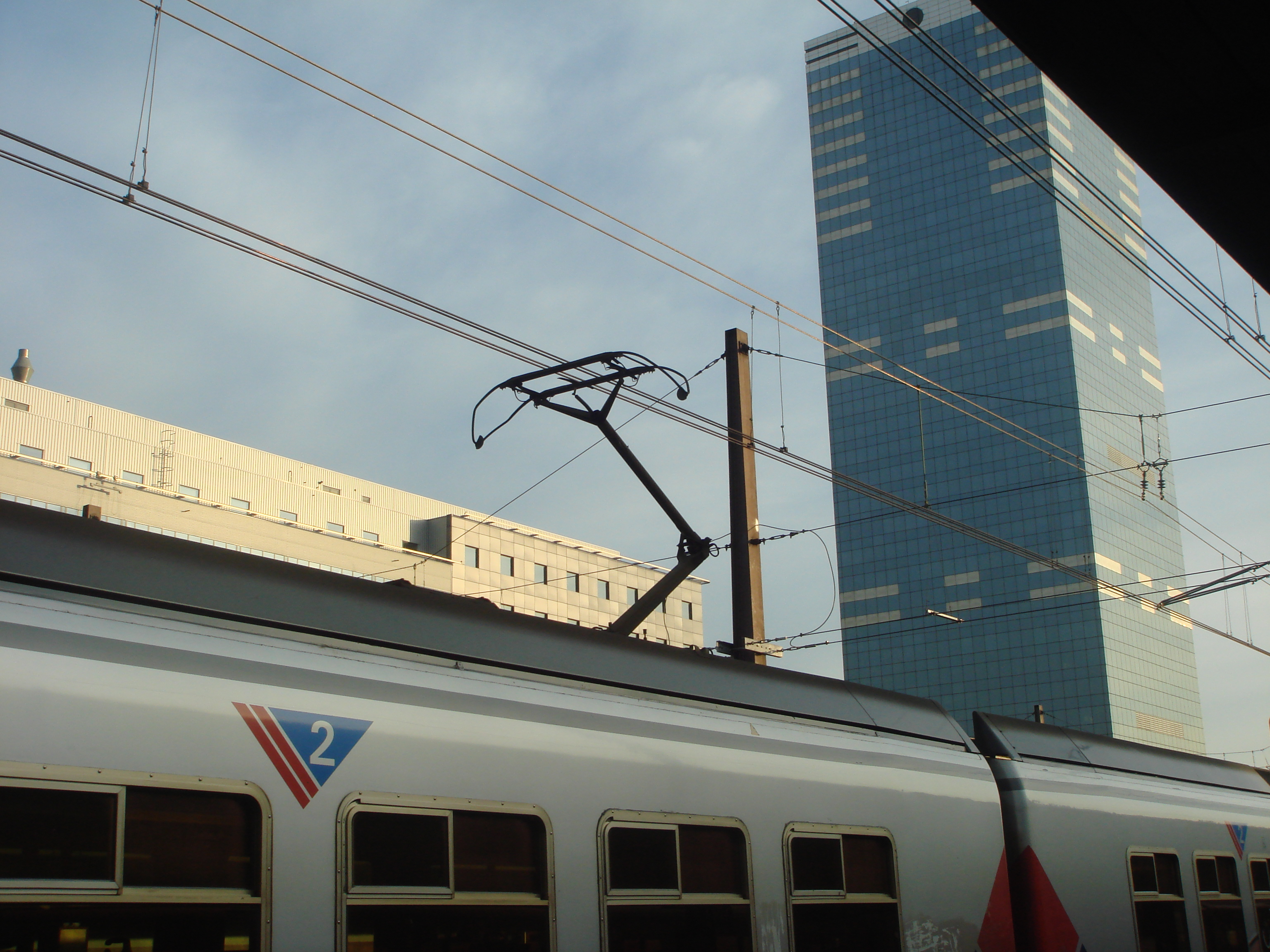
A Brecknell Willis pantograph on a Belgian train, April 2008

Brecknell Willis is a Wabtec company headquartered in Chard, Somerset, South West England and brand-name of electrification equipment for railways, mostly pantographs and contact shoes.

== History ==
Henry Brecknell and Sons began operating in 1854. In 1894, it moved into electrification. Since 1938 it has been in Chard, when known as Brecknell, Willis & Co. Ltd.

In 2023, site's production facility was closed by Wabtec. The production was transferred to other Wabtec plants while the office in Chard will maintain its engineering, project management, and sales office.

== Products ==
For the London Underground, it has supplied shoe gear and conductor rail systems, as well as pantographs to the rail industry.

=== Pantographs ===
==== Low height pantograph ====
The Brecknell Willis Low Height pantograph is one of the four standard devices in use on British railway locomotives and multiple units and is a development of the standard Brecknell Willis High Speed pantograph. The Low Height pantograph is suitable for speeds up to 160 kilometres per hour (99 mph). It has a small aerofoil mounted on the knuckle joint between the upper and lower arms.

==== High reach pantograph ====
Although it had been used on a few rapid transit systems and on a Blackpool tram, the first use of the high reach pantograph in the UK was the main lines was back in 1974 when a small number were fitted to some Class 309s based at Ilford EMU Depot. These continued to be used until around 1980 when they were all removed.

==== High speed pantograph ====
The High speed pantograph was designed during the late 1970s and early 1980s as part of ongoing research into developing a pantograph capable of speeds over the 100 mph (160 km/h) limit of the Stone Faiveley AMBR pantograph, which was the standard type in use at the time. The first locomotive to be fitted with the pantograph was Class 86 No 86244, during February 1980. The pantograph is the mainstay within the UK railway system, where it is used on most overhead electric locomotives and EMUs. It has also been exported across the world, being used on the US high speed train Acela and the Eurostar Class 373.

== Gallery ==
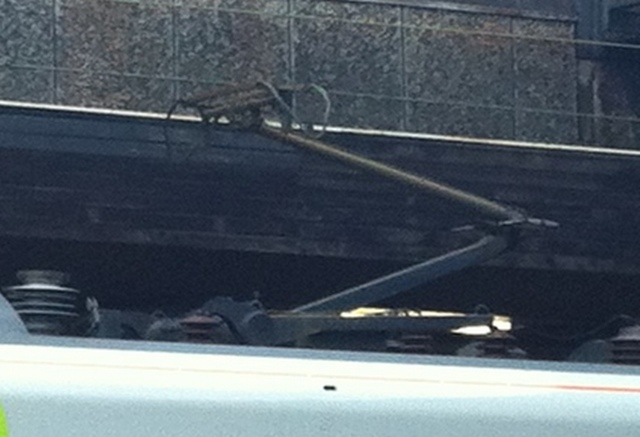
Low height pantograph

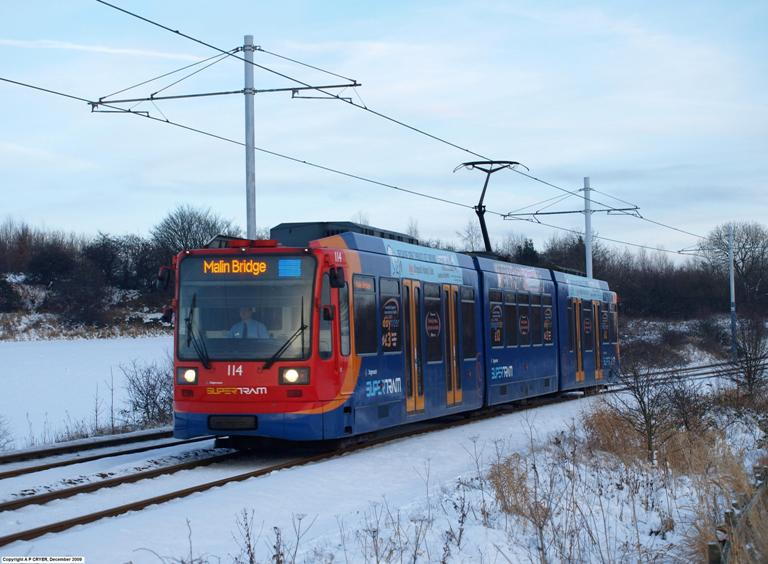
Sheffield Supertram Siemens-Duewag Supertram

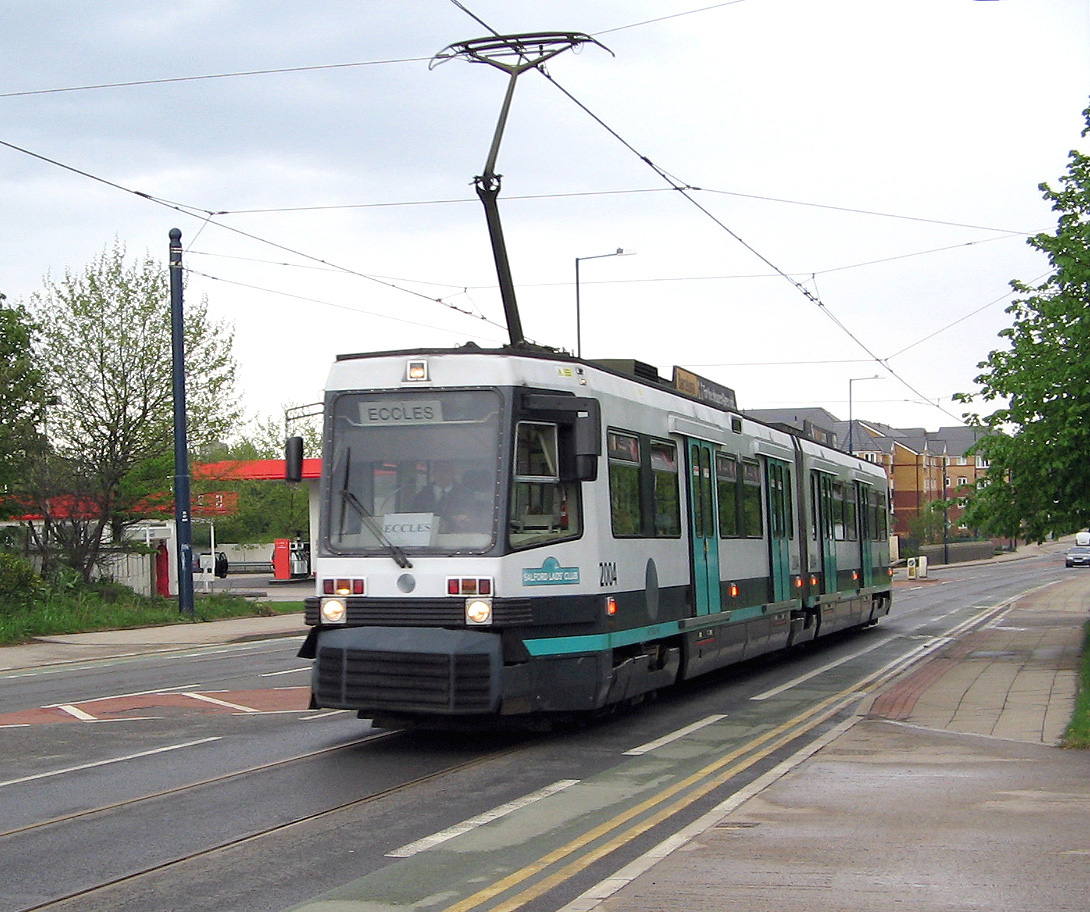
Manchester Metrolink AnsaldoBreda T-68

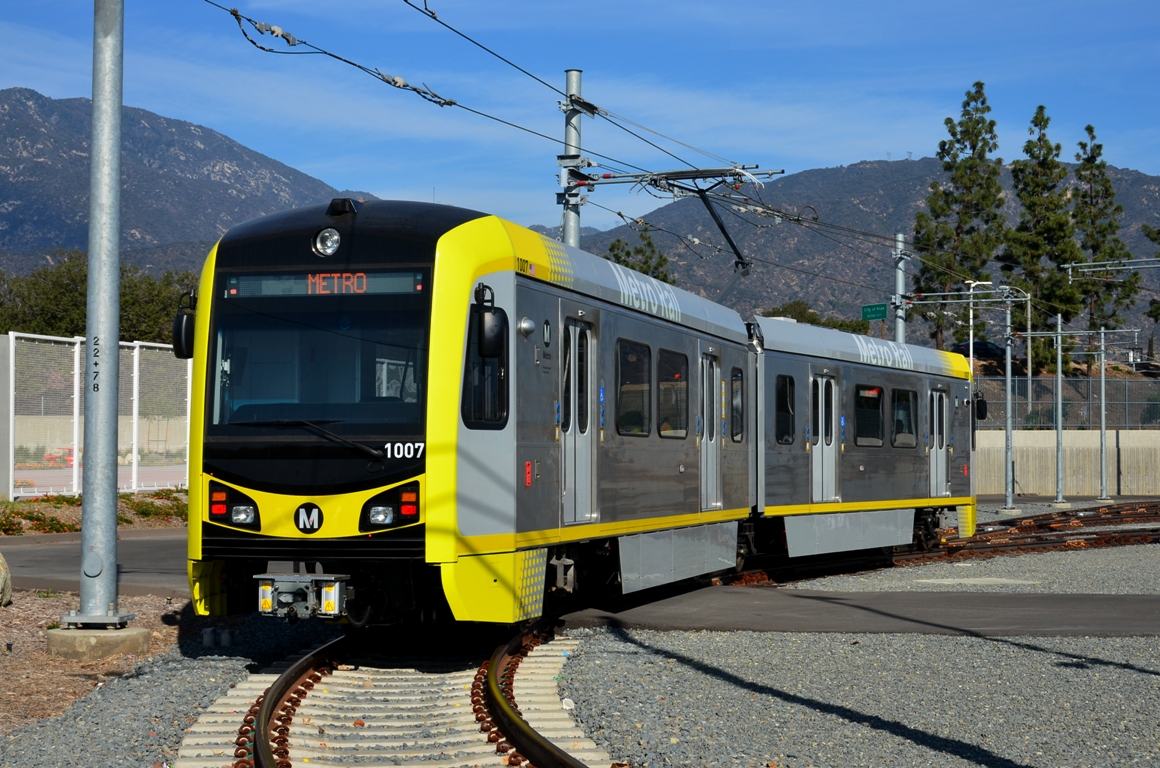
Los Angeles Metro Rail Kinki Sharyo P3010

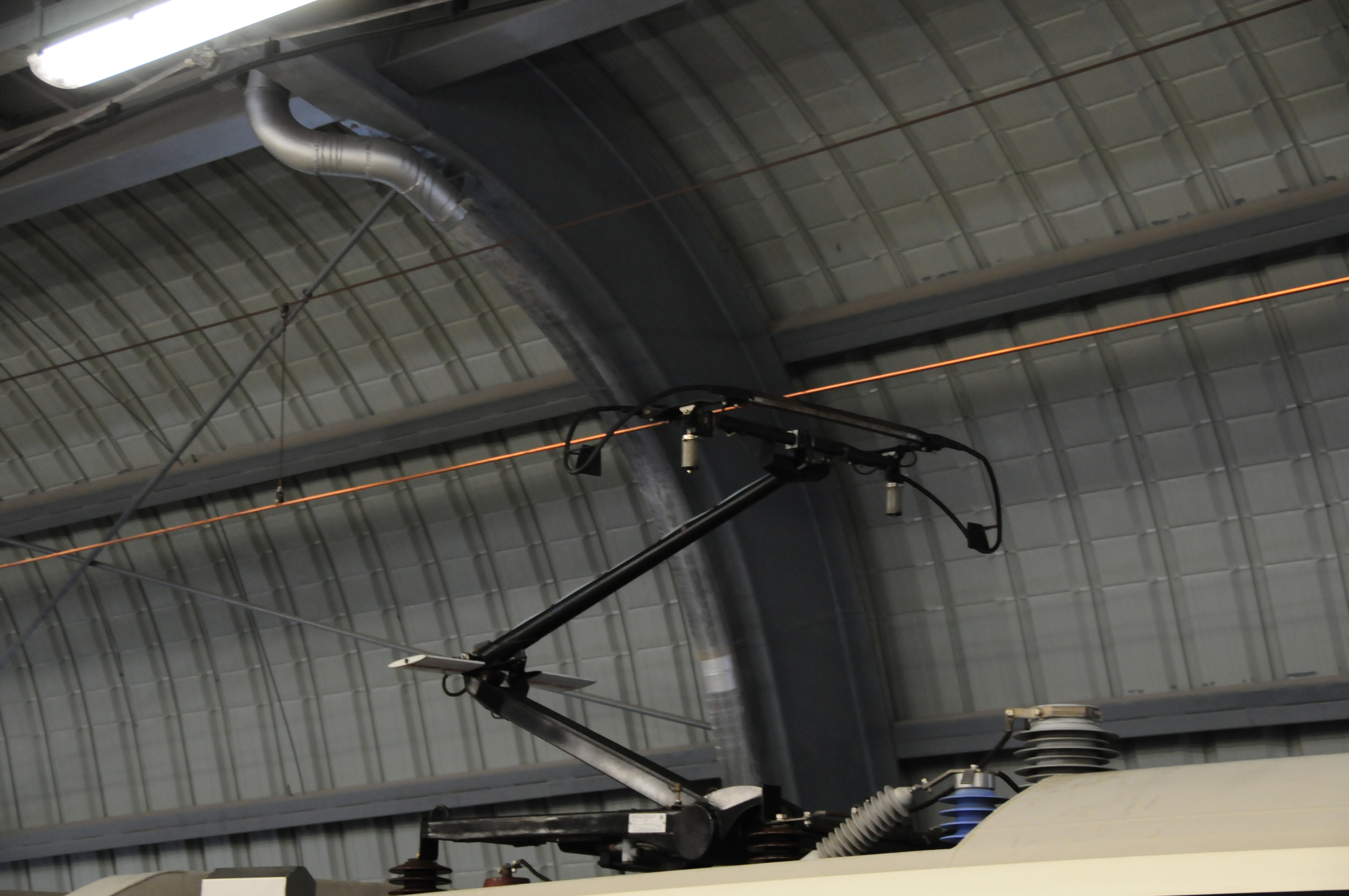
Siemens Desiro Class 360/2 pantograph with the characteristic aerofoils clearly visible

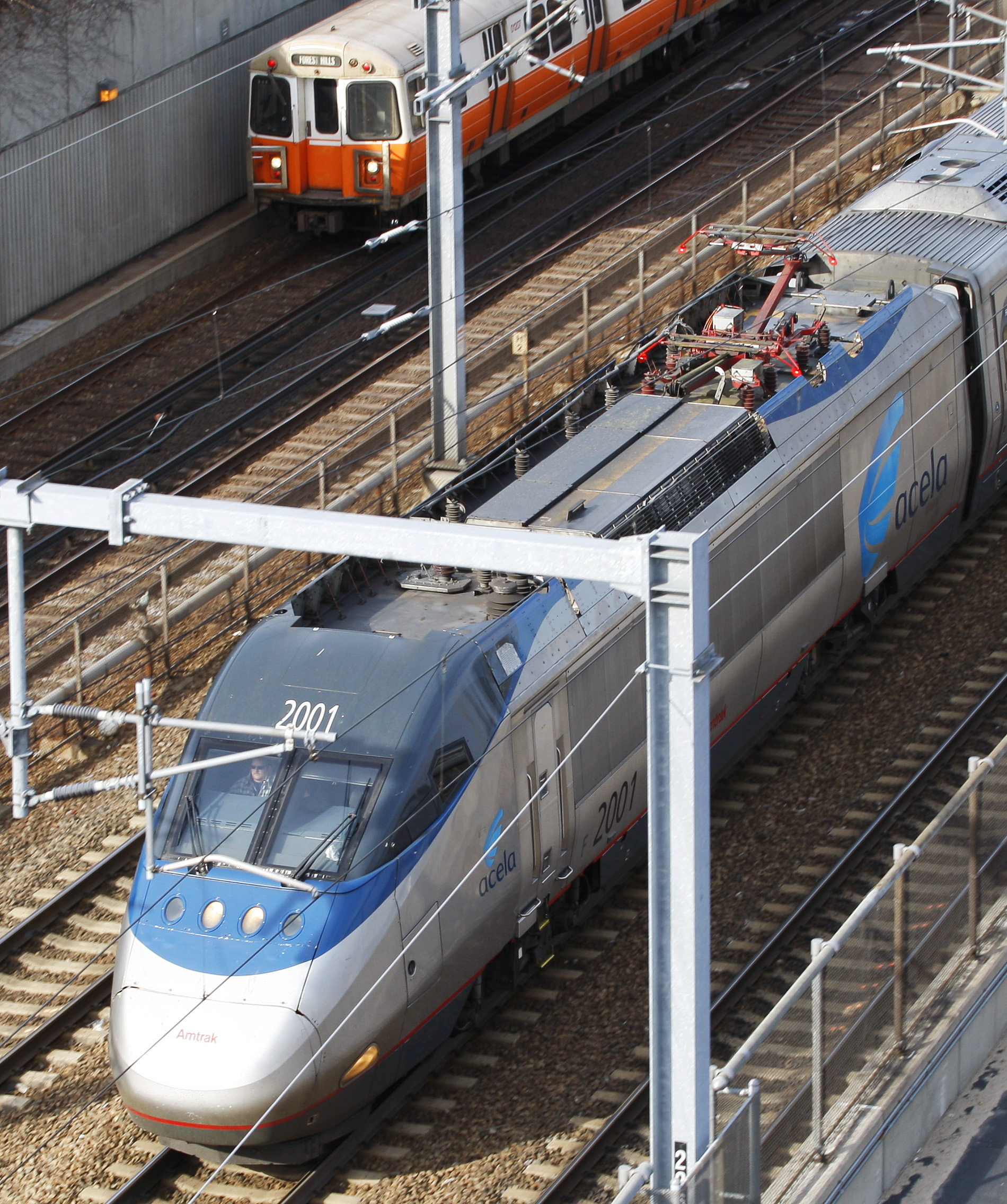
Overhead view of the Brecknell Willis High Speed pantograph in action on the US Acela vehicle
