= Nunnery engine shed =

Coordinates: 53°23′3.9″N 1°26′37.2″W

Nunnery engine shed was a small locomotive depot close to the city centre of Sheffield, South Yorkshire, England.

== History ==
After gaining running powers over the Manchester, Sheffield and Lincolnshire Railway to reach Sheffield, the London and North Western Railway (LNWR) set about building facilities, not only to serve its customers but to service the locomotives needed to operate these facilities. The original goods terminus, known as City Goods, was situated near Bernard Road but later the line was extended to a new multi-storey goods facility adjacent to the canal basin in Wharf Street and the "City Goods" name transferred.

The Bernard Road facility was retained as its cranes had higher weight limits: 40 tons compared with 10 tons at the new City Goods.

To service the locomotives a small engine shed was built within a complex of lines adjacent to the Nunnery Colliery line between the colliery and its landsale depot. The shed was brick-built with a saw-tooth roof and could accommodate six locomotives.

The shed was opened in the early years of the 20th century and closed in 1928, as the LNWR had become part of the London, Midland and Scottish Railway at Grouping and other, larger and better equipped depots were available within the area. The shed, however, was not demolished until the 1960s when it was nothing more than a vandalised shell.
