= Gleadless Townend =

Coordinates: 53.345°N 1.42°W

- Location within South Yorkshire
- Metropolitan borough: Sheffield
- Metropolitan county: South Yorkshire
- Region: Yorkshire and the Humber
- Country: England
- Sovereign state: United Kingdom
- Post town: Sheffield
- Postcode district: S12
- Dialling code: 0114
- Police: South Yorkshire
- Fire: South Yorkshire
- Ambulance: Yorkshire
- UK Parliament: Sheffield South East

Gleadless Townend is an outer city district of Sheffield centred on the junction of the ring road, White Lane (B6054) and Gleadless Road (B6388).

== Transport ==
Gleadless Townend is served by several bus routes and two routes of the Sheffield Supertram light rail network, forming a minor transport interchange.

Bus routes serving Gleadless Townend include First South Yorkshire's 18 and 51 routes and TM Travel's 252 service.

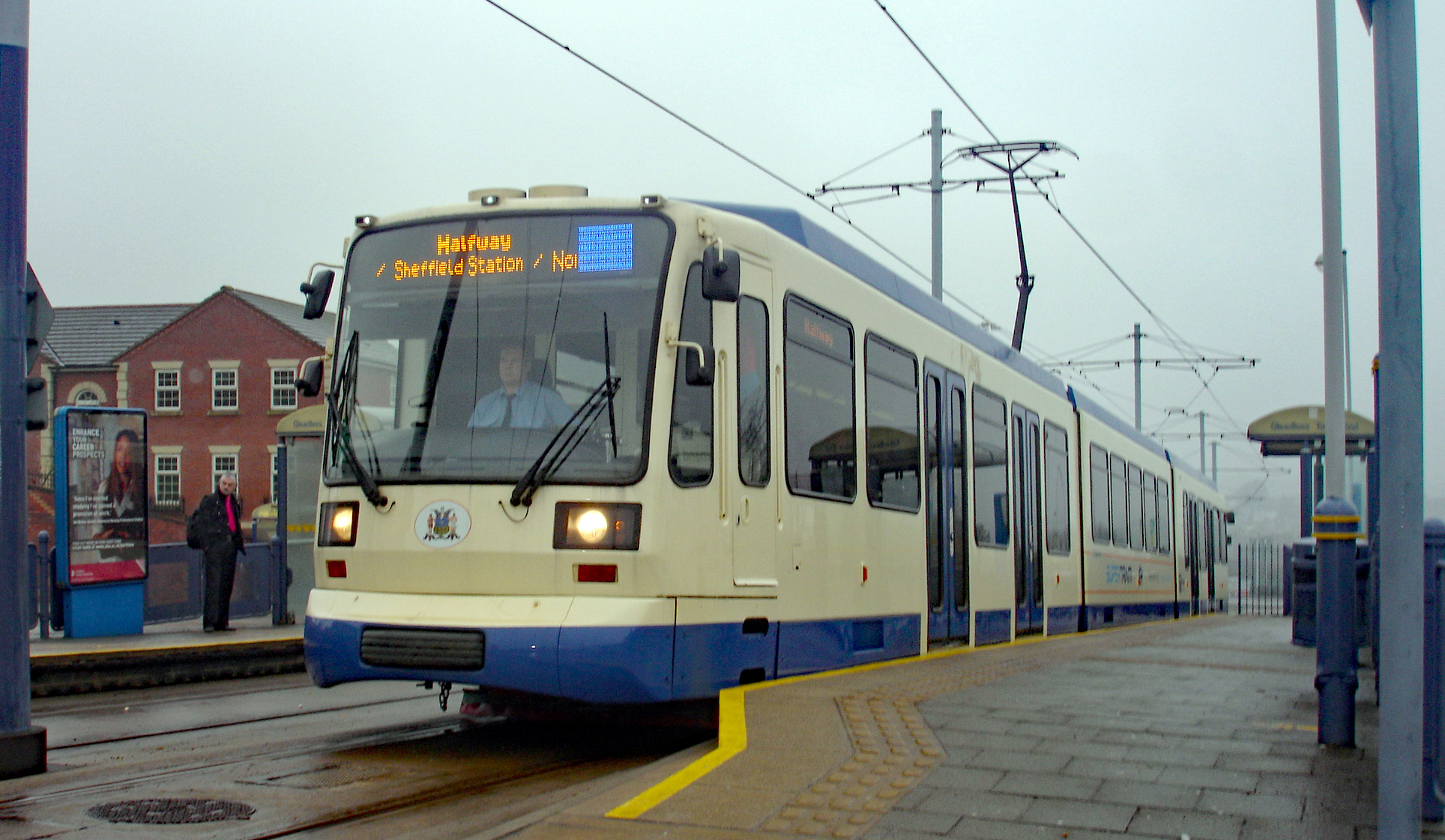
A Supertram at Gleadless Townend.

Gleadless Townend tram stop is located on both the Blue and Purple routes. It was opened on 5 December 1994, with a full service on all lines launched from 3 April 1995.

On 20 September 2008, a 75-year-old woman was seriously injured when she fell and was struck by a tram arriving at the tram stop. She was transferred to the Northern General Hospital, suffering from head injuries and a fractured pelvis and leg.

Preceding station	Sheffield Supertram	Following station
Hollinsend towards Malin Bridge	Blue Line	White Lane towards Halfway
Hollinsend towards Cathedral	Purple Line	Herdings / Leighton Road towards Herdings Park
