= South Yorkshire Supertram =

Light rail system in South Yorkshire, England

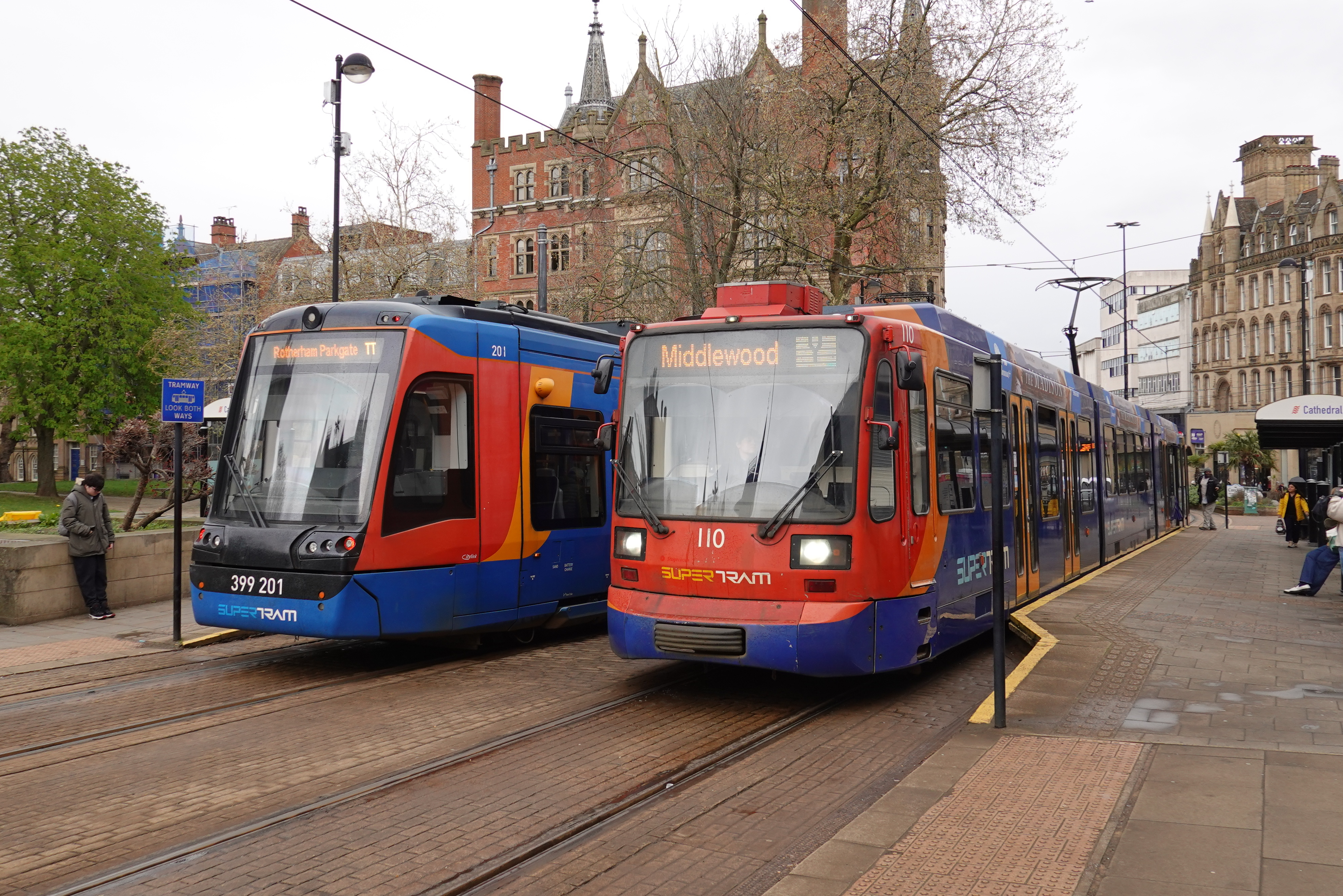
- A Class 399 and a Siemens-Duewag Supertram at Cathedral tram stop in April 2026.

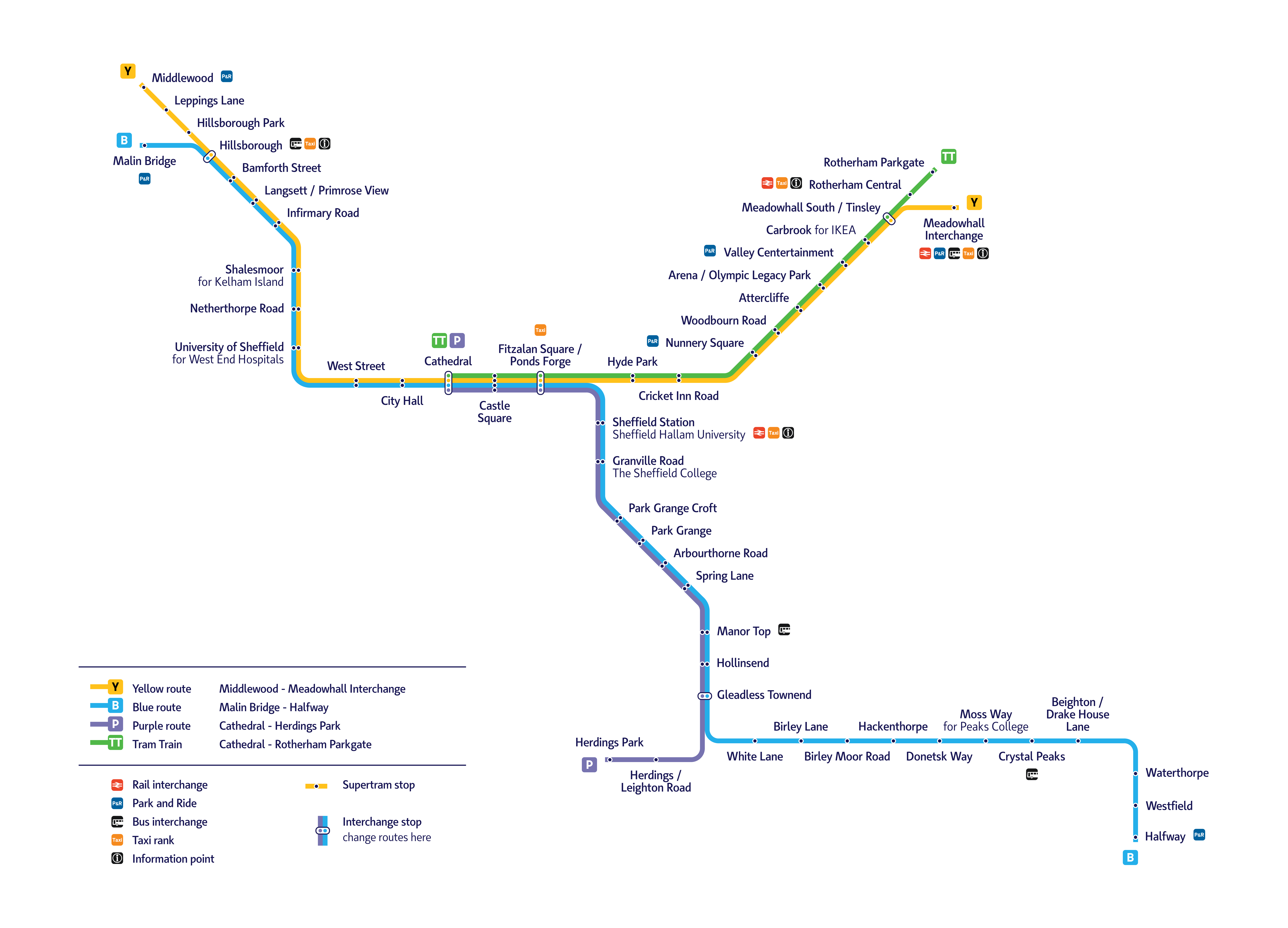
- A schematic map of the Supertram network.

Overview
- Owner: South Yorkshire Mayoral Combined Authority
- Area served: Rotherham; Sheffield
- Locale: South Yorkshire (Note: An approximately 500 m (1,600 ft) section of track on the Blue route, between Birley Lane and White Lane tram stops, crosses the county border into Derbyshire; however there are no tram stops on the Derbyshire side of the border.)
- Transit type: Light rail; Tram; Tram-train
- Number of lines: 4 B P Y TT
- Number of stations: 51 (list)
- Annual ridership: 8.5 million (2025/26) ▼6%
- Headquarters: Nunnery Depot, Sheffield
- Website: www.travelsouthyorkshire.com/en-GB/supertram/home

Operation
- Began operation: 21 March 1994; 32 years ago
- Operator: South Yorkshire Future Trams
- Number of vehicles: 25 Siemens-Duewag Supertram; 7 Class 399 Stadler Citylink

Technical
- System length: 34.6 km (21.5 miles)
- Track gauge: 4 ft 8 1/2 in (1,435 mm) standard gauge
- Electrification: 750 V DC overhead line
- Top speed: 55 mph (89 km/h)

The South Yorkshire Supertram (Note: Between 1997 and 2024, the network was officially operated under the brand name Stagecoach Supertram. The network was colloquially referred to as the Sheffield Supertram during this time; after returning to public ownership in 2024, the original South Yorkshire Supertram name was re-adopted.) is a tram and tram-train network covering Sheffield and Rotherham in South Yorkshire, England. The network is owned and operated by the South Yorkshire Mayoral Combined Authority (SYMCA). (Note: The infrastructure and rolling stock of the Supertram network is directly owned by the South Yorkshire Mayoral Combined Authority. Day-to-day operation of the network is subcontracted to South Yorkshire Future Trams Limited (SYFTL), which is a wholly-owned arm's-length subsidiary of the SYMCA.)

Interest in building a modern tram system for Sheffield had mounted during the 1980s. After detailed planning by South Yorkshire Passenger Transport Executive (SYPTE), the Supertram proposal was approved by an act of Parliament, the South Yorkshire Light Rail Transit Act 1988 (c. xxvii). Construction of the network, incorporating several existing heavy rail sections as well as new track, was carried out in sections, allowing revenue services to start during 1994. Early operations, hindered by a complex ticketing system and the initially small coverage area, had disappointing ridership figures. In an effort to turn around the performance, operations were privatised to Stagecoach in 1997, at price of £1.15 million, who took over from South Yorkshire Supertram Limited. After management and operational changes, and further expansion of the system, ridership numbers rose considerably. In March 2024, the network returned to public ownership as the concession awarded to Stagecoach came to an end.

From 2008, interest had been expressed in hybrid tram-train operations, which would be able to use sections of the mainline rail network as well as tramways. During 2012 an experimental trial was planned, as this was to be the first deployment of tram-trains anywhere in the United Kingdom. The start of tram-train operations, using a purpose-built fleet of new Class 399 Vossloh Citylink electric multiple units, was repeatedly delayed, but on 25 October 2018, operations of the new tram-train line commenced.

The Supertram network now consists of 51 stations across four colour-coded lines, the Blue, Purple, Yellow and Tram-Train (Black) routes, which connect with local and national bus and rail services and seven park and ride sites.

== History ==
=== Background and initial launch ===
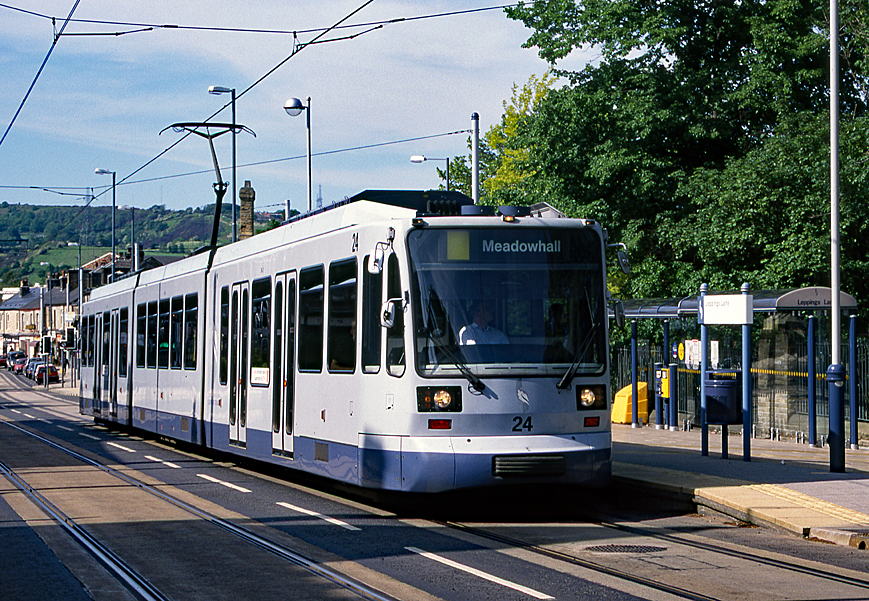
Tram no. 24 (now 124) at Leppings Lane, 1996

In common with many British cities, Sheffield used to have an extensive tram network, the Sheffield Tramway (1873–1960). This finally closed in October 1960, it then being argued that motorised buses offered superior economics.

The new Supertram network arose from ambitions held by the South Yorkshire Passenger Transport Executive (SYPTE), which had been assigned the role of public transport co-ordination in the area. SYPTE refined an earlier and more expansive light rail proposal to include pre-existing heavy rail alignments, in order to gain the required permissions to proceed, and deposited several bills to Parliament in 1985–1990 to gain the necessary powers. Financial approval was given by the Department of Transport towards the end of 1990, allowing the £240 million construction of the initial line to commence in 1991.

This line was opened in stages between 1994 and 1995. The first section, located along a former heavy rail alignment to Meadowhall, opened on 21 March 1994. The network was operated by South Yorkshire Supertram Limited, a wholly owned subsidiary company of SYPTE established to run the venture.

In the early years, the scheme was viewed by some as a failure; passengers continued using cheaper and more frequent buses, and retailers complained about the disruption caused by the lengthy construction works. The complex ticketing system was also a source of irritation and confusion to passengers. It became clear that projections for passenger numbers had been overly optimistic, and concern arose that the system represented poor value for money. The matter of who should bear the cost became an issue.

=== Review and privatisation ===
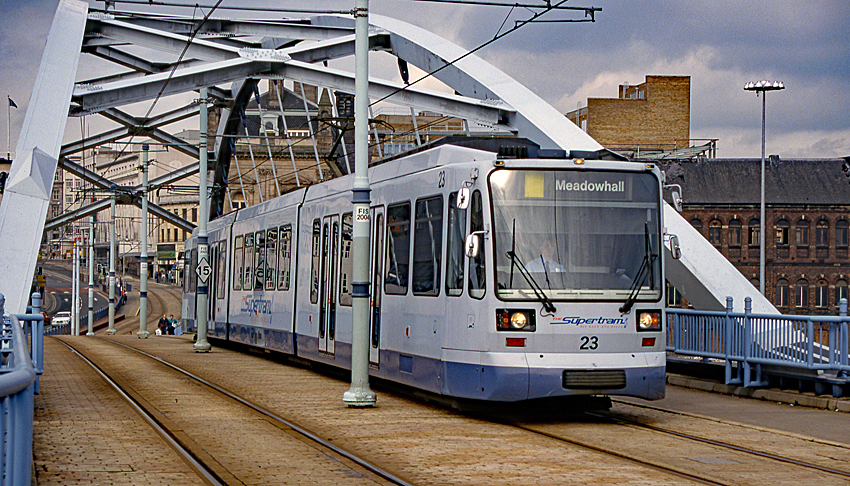
23 with Supertram branding on the bowstring bridge

By 1996, the councils backing the Supertram brought in consultants to draw up options to address major operational and managerial problems. In December 1997, South Yorkshire Supertram Limited was privatised, and sold to Stagecoach for £1.15 million, substantially below the anticipated £80 million that the councils had hoped to raise to help pay off the accumulated debts, leaving several local councils with the long-term debt for the Supertram's establishment. Under the terms of the deal struck by the Labour government, a reduction in operating costs was achieved, but it was calculated that the people of South Yorkshire were each paying 5p per week for the Supertram, which continued over many years. Stagecoach acquired the concession for the maintenance and operation of the Supertram network until 2024.

=== Increasing use – and decline ===
There were initially plans for Supertram to extend services to a greater area of South Yorkshire, such as lines to Barnsley and Doncaster, but progress has been restricted. According to BBC News, frustration was expressed amongst people outside of Sheffield that they were paying for something they do not use.

However, by 2014 plans to extend Supertram were in various stages of action, and patronage had gone up, from 7.8 million passenger journeys in 1996/97, to 15.0 million during 2011/12. The increase in usage was credited to various factors. Industry publication Rail pointed towards changes to route patterns, the introduction of onboard conductors, ticket simplification and refurbishment of the trams themselves as having generated greater appeal amongst the public.

Between 2012 and 2017, the number of passengers and operating revenue declined; during 2016/17, the network carried 12.6 million passengers. Reasons presented for the reduction included the disruptive rail replacement effort across the network, which involved partial closures and the use of buses as temporary replacements, as well as the impact of cheaper petrol.

=== Tram-train services ===
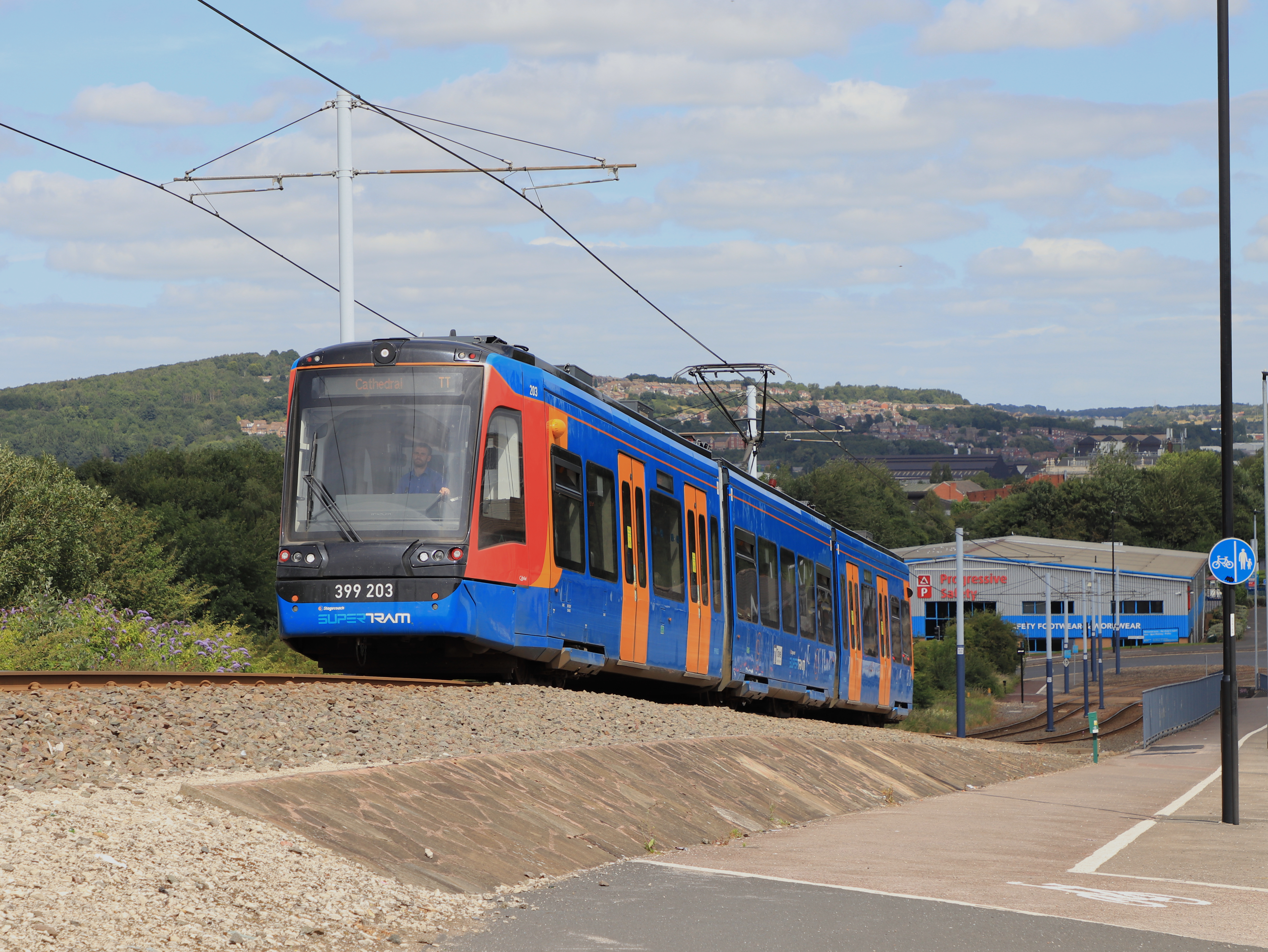
Stadler Citylink (Class 399) tram-train 203 climbs out of the Woodbourn Road stop

The tram-train extension to Rotherham opened on 25 October 2018, using seven new Vossloh-built Class 399 Citylink articulated electric multiple units. Trams operate on Network Rail's line from Tinsley to Rotherham station and beyond to the Parkgate shopping centre, where services terminate on a short spur at the side of the railway, after travelling on the Supertram line from Cathedral to Meadowhall South/Tinsley. The station at Rotherham Central is a combined tram stop and railway station, with platforms 1 and 2 at Rotherham Central extended, with the new extensions numbered platforms 3 and 4 respectively. The stop at Parkgate is a single platform terminus. The first test run of the tram-train service (as far as the Magna Science Adventure Centre) was performed in the early hours of 10 May 2018, and the first gauging run all the way to Parkgate occurred in the early hours of 5 June 2018.

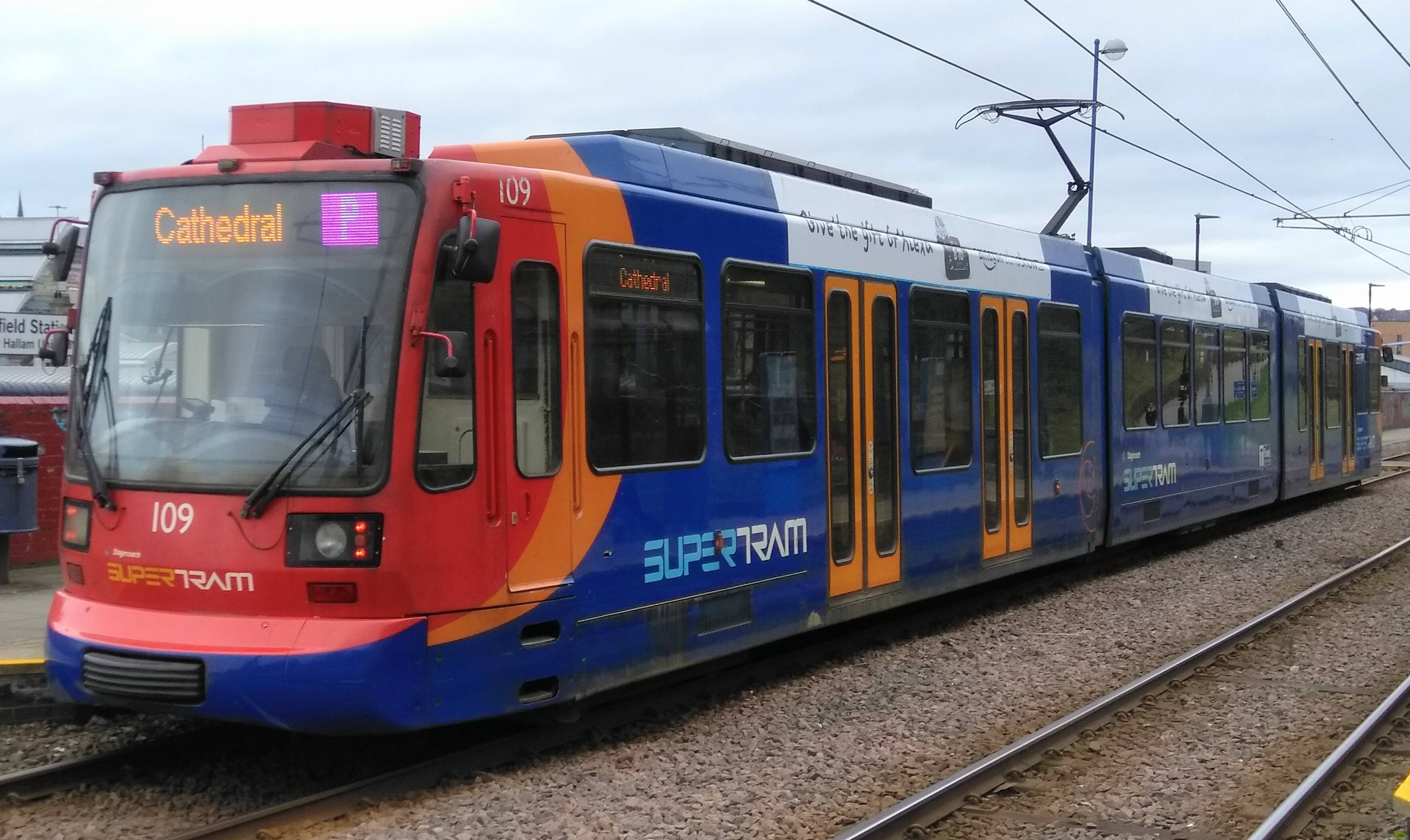
Siemens-Duewag Supertram 109 at Sheffield station

The existing Siemens-Duewag Supertram fleet were not upgraded for tram-train operation, so were not registered under TOPS and cannot be used on the line as they lack the relevant Network Rail safety systems and crashworthiness. The tram-train scheme was first planned to be in service by 2015 but was delayed.

The Class 399 units were built in 2015/16 with the first delivered in December 2015. Until the completion of the tram-train line, some were used to provide increased capacity on the existing Supertram network. They first entered service on 14 September 2017.

On the opening day of tram-train passenger operations the service was suspended following a road traffic collision on the tram network involving one of the tram-train vehicles. The incident was caused by lorry operated by Ability Handling passing a red traffic light and caused the tram to be derailed. The service has also been suspended twice after faults were found on the Citylink units. The first suspension was on 9 April 2019, when the fleet was withdrawn to undergo safety checks, although service resumed the next day. The service was later suspended again on 14 December 2019, resuming three days later on 17 December. Services have also operated on a reduced frequency several times whilst work has been undertaken on the Citylink fleet.

In July 2021 a public consultation was opened about plans to build a new stop on the Tram Train route at Magna, outside the Magna Science Adventure Centre. In March 2024 Network Rail and South Yorkshire Mayoral Combined Authority (SYMCA) approved the new station at Magna, Templeborough. The station is located between the Meadowhall South/Tinsley stop and the Rotherham Central stop. It has two staggered low-level tram-train platforms, one for each line, with a connecting footbridge and an additional 29 parking spaces were created at the Magna site. The scheme costed £6.6 million and was funded from the Sheffield City Region's £166 million Transforming Cities Fund. Construction on the Magna stop commenced in March 2025 and it officially opened to passengers on 9 April 2026.

=== Return to public operation ===
On 18 October 2022 the South Yorkshire Mayor Oliver Coppard announced that the service would return to public operation once Stagecoach's contract expired in March 2024, alongside a £100 million grant by the central government to modernise parts of the system. The date of the transfer was 22 March 2024, with a new operating company known as the South Yorkshire Future Trams Limited (SYFTL) taking over all Supertram operations.

Coppard's authority manages the publicly owned arm's length organisation to manage the tram service.

=== Summary of opening dates ===
- 21 March 1994: Fitzalan Square to Meadowhall
- 22 August 1994: Fitzalan Square to Spring Lane
- 5 December 1994: Spring Lane to Gleadless Townend
- 18 February 1995: Fitzalan Square to Cathedral
- 27 February 1995: Cathedral to Shalesmoor
- 27 March 1995: Gleadless Townend to Halfway
- 3 April 1995: Gleadless Townend to Herdings Park
- 23 October 1995: Shalesmoor to Middlewood/Malin Bridge
- 25 October 2018: Tinsley/Meadowhall South to Parkgate (tram-train)
- 6 April 2026: Magna station

== Current network ==
=== Routes ===
The South Yorkshire Supertram network is organised around Park Square and consists of four lines – Yellow, Blue, Purple and Tram-Train (black on maps)

The lines, with termini at Meadowhall Interchange, Parkgate, Halfway and Hillsborough, all serve Sheffield city centre and meet at Park Square where a triangular junction was constructed to provide interchange between lines and operational flexibility. A pair of small branches serving Malin Bridge, from Hillsborough Interchange, and Herdings Park branch out from two of the main lines. Turnaround points are located along the network to turn trams around and onto the adjacent track, usually used if trams are unable to proceed along their usual route. They are located at: Sheffield Station, Park Square, Cathedral, Shalesmoor, Hillsborough, Nunnery Square, Sheffield Arena, Spring Lane, Gleadless Town End, Birley Lane and Donetsk Way.

The Supertram runs from Sheffield City Centre north-west to Middlewood and Malin Bridge via the University of Sheffield and Hillsborough; north-east to Meadowhall Interchange and Parkgate via Attercliffe; and south-east to Halfway and Herdings Park via Norfolk Park, Manor, and Gleadless.

The three main City Centre stops are located on one side of a former dual carriageway, now a single lane and reserved for buses and taxis only. These three stops are served by all routes.

=== Stops ===
The tram stops on each of the four routes are as follows:

Yellow Route	Blue Route	Purple Route	Tram-train Route
Middlewood Park & Ride; Leppings Lane; Hillsborough Park; Hillsborough Interchange; Bamforth Street; Langsett Primrose View; Infirmary Road; Shalesmoor for Kelham Island; Netherthorpe Road; University of Sheffield for West End Hospitals; West Street; City Hall; Cathedral; Castle Square; Fitzalan Square Ponds Forge; Hyde Park; Cricket Inn Road; Nunnery Square Park & Ride; Woodbourn Road; Attercliffe; Arena Olympic Legacy Park; Valley Centertainment; Carbrook for IKEA; Tinsley Meadowhall South; Meadowhall Interchange	Malin Bridge; Hillsborough Interchange; Bamforth Street; Langsett Primrose View; Infirmary Road; Shalesmoor for Kelham Island; Netherthorpe Road; University of Sheffield for West End Hospitals; West Street; City Hall; Cathedral; Castle Square; Fitzalan Square Ponds Forge; Sheffield Station Sheffield Hallam University; Granville Road The Sheffield College; Park Grange Croft; Park Grange Road; Arbourthorne Road; Spring Lane; Manor Top; Hollinsend; Gleadless Townend; White Lane; Birley Lane; Birley Moor Road; Hackenthorpe; Donetsk Way; Moss Way for Peaks College; Crystal Peaks; Beighton Drakehouse Lane; Waterthorpe; Westfield; Halfway Park & Ride	Herdings Park; Herdings Leighton Road; Gleadless Townend; Hollinsend; Manor Top; Spring Lane; Arbourthorne Road; Park Grange Road; Park Grange Croft; Granville Road The Sheffield College; Sheffield Station Sheffield Hallam University; Fitzalan Square Ponds Forge; Castle Square; Cathedral	Parkgate; Rotherham Central; Magna; Tinsley Meadowhall South; Carbrook for IKEA; Valley Centertainment; Arena Olympic Legacy Park; Attercliffe; Woodbourn Road; Nunnery Square Park & Ride; Cricket Inn Road; Hyde Park; Fitzalan Square Ponds Forge; Castle Square; Cathedral

=== Service frequency ===
==== Blue Route ====
Weekday and Saturday services run to a peak frequency of every 12 minutes at peak operational times between Malin Bridge and Halfway, and less at other times. Sunday services operate to a peak frequency of every 20 minutes, and less at other times.

==== Yellow Route ====
Weekday and Saturday services run to a peak frequency of every 12 minutes at peak operational times between Middlewood and Meadowhall Interchange, and less at other times. Sunday services operate to a peak frequency of every 20 minutes, and less at other times.

==== Purple Route ====
Weekday and Saturday services run hourly between Cathedral and Herdings Park during all operational times. Sunday services run to a peak frequency of every 30 minutes, and runs hourly at other times.

==== Tram-Train (Black) Route ====
Services run between Cathedral and Parkgate every 30 minutes during operational times.

==== COVID-19 services ====
A reduced level of service was introduced across the Supertram network on 23 March 2020, in response to the COVID-19 pandemic in the United Kingdom. A modified Sunday timetable was in operation, until services were further reduced to hourly on 1 April.

=== Onward transport links ===
The Stagecoach Yorkshire bus company formerly operated the SL1 and SL1a "SupertramLink" routes between the Middlewood terminus of the Yellow route and Stocksbridge, via Oughtibridge. The bus ran at the same frequency as the tram and was timetabled to connect with the tram at Middlewood. Through single, return, day and week tickets were available to allow travel on both Supertram and SupertramLink bus services. On 1 June 2020, Stagecoach withdrew the dedicated SupertramLink bus from Middlewood to Stocksbridge, providing an enhanced service on local bus service 57 from Hillsborough to Stocksbridge in its place.

== Rolling stock ==
=== Current fleet ===
The following fleet is operated across the Supertram network:

Class	Image	Type	Top speed		Length metres	Capacity			In service	Fleet numbers	Routes operated	Built	Years operated
Class	Image	Type	mph	km/h	Length metres	Std	Sdg	Total	In service	Fleet numbers	Routes operated	Built	Years operated
Siemens-Duewag Supertram		Tram	50	80	34.75	86	155	241	25	101–125	Blue, Purple, Yellow	1992	1994–present
Vossloh Citylink (Class 399)		Tram-train	62	100	37.2	96	140	236	7	201–207 (Note: As these vehicles operate on the National Rail network as well as the Supertram network, they have been additionally allocated the TOPS numbers 399201–399207.)	Blue, Purple, Tram-train, Yellow	2014–2015	2017–present
Total									32				

==== Siemens-Duewag Supertram ====
The network operates 25 three car trams built by Siemens-Duewag of Düsseldorf, Germany, in 1992. The trams are 40% low floor design, the vehicles have been specially designed for gradients as steep as 10%. In the 1980s a design choice was taken to create the longest possible vehicle to avoid multiple working which resulted in a 34.8-metre (114 ft) design, the third-longest tram design in operation in Europe at the time and the longest in service in the UK until the 42.8-metre (140 ft) long Edinburgh Trams were introduced.

Launched in an initial light grey livery, following the awarding of the operating franchise to Stagecoach the trams were reliveried in Stagecoach's corporate livery from 1997. From 2006 the trams were refurbished, and a new dedicated Supertram blue–based livery was launched, with the entire fleet completed in early 2009.

==== Vossloh Citylink (Class 399) ====
Vossloh supplied seven tram-train vehicles, delivered between November 2015 and November 2016.

== Infrastructure ==
=== Track ===
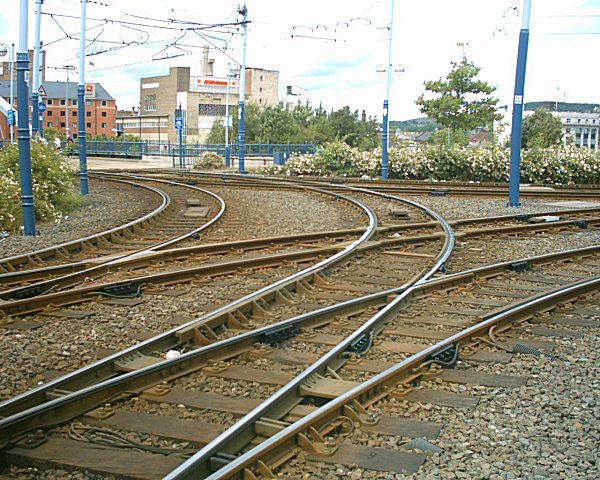
Detail of the Supertram triangular junction at Park Square

The network is 29 km (18 miles) long, with 60 km (37 miles) of track. It features two types of track; tramway track where either pedestrians or road traffic share the right of way and ballasted railway track when there are no such requirements.

Tramway track consists of a grooved tramway rail set into a concrete base with troughs into which the rails are laid. Most of the track is on-street using 35G-section grooved tram rail, with BS11-80A 80 lb/yd (39.7 kg/m) flat-bottom rail elsewhere. The railway track was supplied by British Steel Corporation Track Products of Workington and laid on sleepers consisting of concrete blocks with steel ties which gives a spring feeling when travelling on these sections. The track is laid on a bed of ballast which in turn rests on a prepared formation. Street crossings are usually laid with grooved tramway rails.

There are some major structures. Two viaducts carry Supertram onto Park Square (a major road junction in the centre of the city), one of them being a six-span viaduct, the other the bowstring steel arch Park Square Bridge. An underpass takes the tram underneath the busy A57 roundabout outside the University of Sheffield.

=== Tram stop design ===
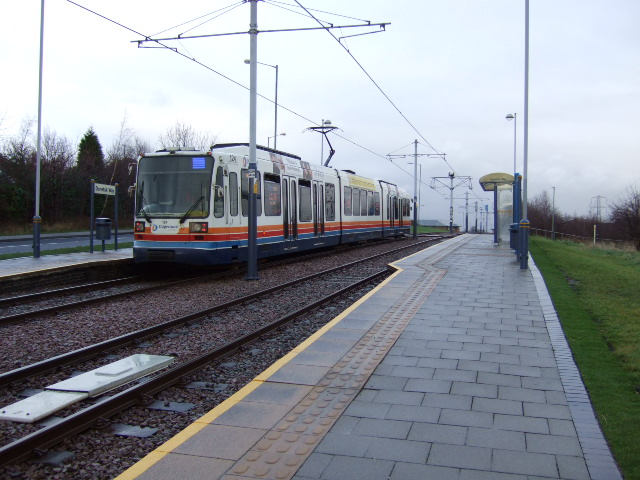
Donetsk Way tram stop. The platform edge's alignment and rugged paving can be seen.

The Supertram has 51 tram stops, which are generally 26.5 m (87 ft) long and 3 m (9.8 ft) deep and are of a network-wide standard making them easy to understand and use. The design incorporates recommendations made by the Cranfield Institute of Technology who studied ergonomics for both able-bodied and disabled users.

The platforms are 37.5 cm (14.8 inches) high, with a 1:20 slope. The platform edge comprises a 60 cm (24-inch) wide light-coloured textured paving with strips of 40 cm (16 inches) wide edge warning tactile strip. Directional guidance tactile paving crosses the width of the platform to coincide with the tram door locations.

=== Power supply ===
Supertram is powered through 12 electric substations and fed through 107 mm^{2} (0.166 sq in) cross-section overhead line equipment (OHLE) wire. The substations convert the 11 kV AC supply into 750 V DC supply into the overhead.

=== Depot ===
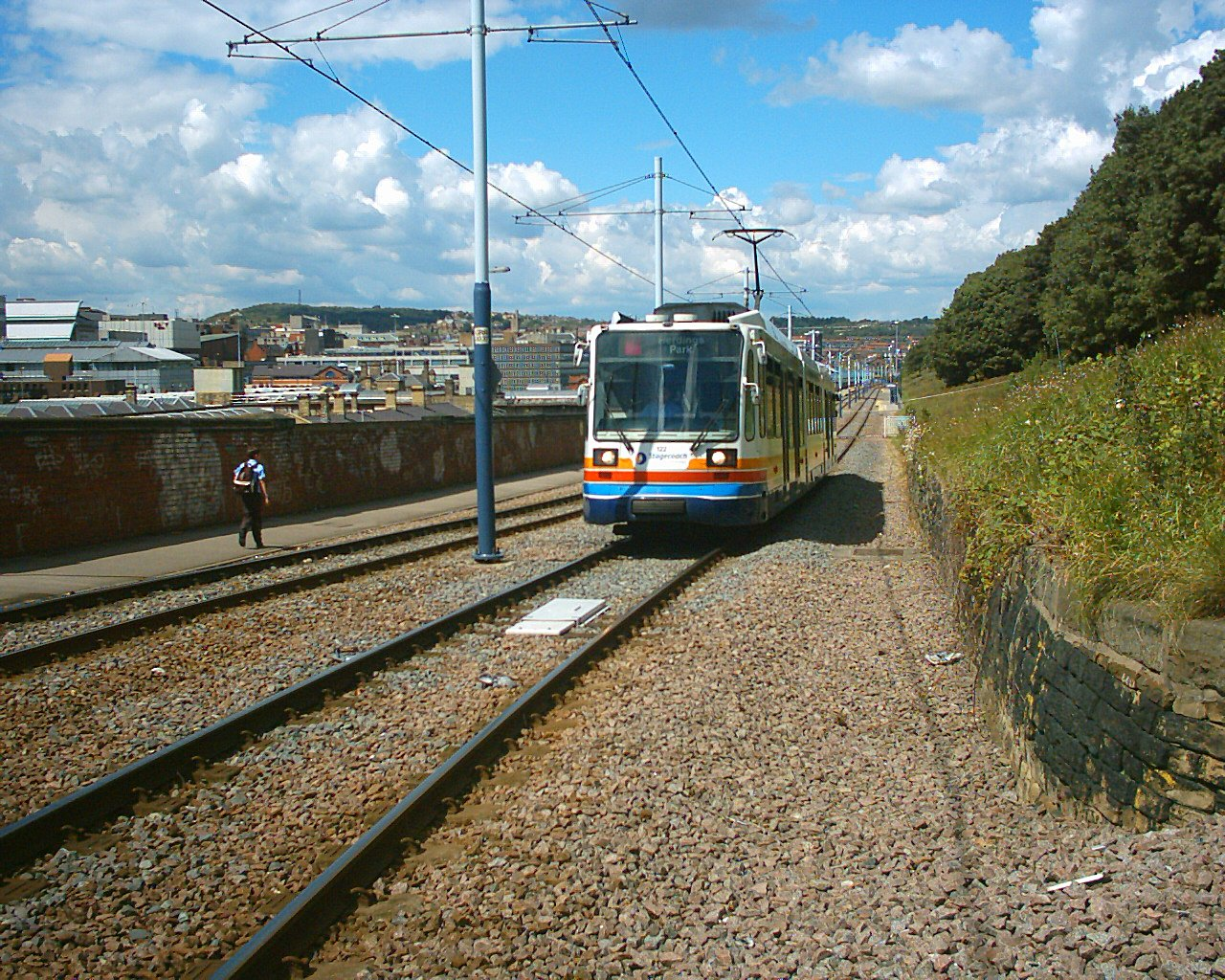
Siemens-Duewag Supertram 122, operating the Purple Route to Herdings Park, on the permanent way leaving Sheffield station for Sheffield College (Granville Road) in July 2004

There is a single depot, located at Nunnery Square, which occupies former carriage sidings alongside the Sheffield to Lincoln railway line. It was designed and constructed by Balfour Beatty on 2.6 hectares (6.4 acres) of land and consists of a three-line workshop building, six stabling sidings, a turning loop, engineers sidings and sundry equipment.

Before the arrival of Supertram, the site was already dedicated to the railway industry. Nunnery engine shed filled most of the site whilst lines of the Midland Railway, Great Central Railway and London & North Eastern Railway irrigated the area and served collieries.

== Fares and ticketing ==
Prior to the Stagecoach takeover, ticketing was done via ticket machines, provided by Abberfield Technology of Australia. These blue ticket machines dispensed adult single ride tickets, senior citizen concessionary tickets and child concessionary tickets. As well as singles, the machines sold multi-packs at a discount. Fare tables were shown on the machines with the validity of the different prices. To travel, each ticket had to be validated in a yellow machine on the platform. The ticket defined the type of passenger and trip. On validation, an overprint was added, giving the tramstop code, time and date of validation and the point of validation.

As the machines did not dispense change, nearby shop-owners were often asked for change to purchase tickets from the machines. There were also problems with machine reliability. Just prior to Stagecoach taking over Supertram a move was made to remove the ticket machines and begin selling tickets on board using conductors. This change brought two key positives: an improved staff presence on board each tram, and meant that passenger's tickets could be systematically checked.

Travel South Yorkshire tickets covering Sheffield or the whole of South Yorkshire are valid on Supertram services as well as local buses and trains. Unlike some other tramway and light rail operators in England, Supertram accepts concessionary travel passes issued by any English local authority. PlusBus tickets are accepted as well. During the period in which Stagecoach held the Supertram franchise, tickets were sold with combined validity on Supertram and Stagecoach Yorkshire bus services; these were discontinued when the tram network returned to public ownership in 2024.

In January 2020 the option to pay for a ticket via credit/debit card, along with other contactless methods of payment (such as Google Pay and Apple Pay), was introduced to all trams. Up until this point the only payment method onboard was cash.

In October 2020, £2.6 million was allocated to Supertram to make up for lost revenue caused by the Coronavirus outbreak.

== Corporate affairs ==
=== Ownership and structure ===
The system is owned by the South Yorkshire Mayoral Combined Authority, which consists of representatives from the metropolitan boroughs of Sheffield, Rotherham, Doncaster, and Barnsley.

Supertram is owned by SYMCA and operated by South Yorkshire Future Trams Ltd (SYFTL), SYFTL is an arm's length body that operates and maintains the network under public ownership after being municipalised on 22 March 2024.

=== Business trends ===
Full financial figures do not appear to be published for the South Yorkshire Supertram; SYPTE produces its own annual accounts, but profit and loss figures for the tram operations are not shown separately. The key available trends in recent years for South Yorkshire Supertram are (years ending 31 March):

	2014	2015	2016	2017	2018	2019	2020	2021	2022	2023	2024	2025	
Passenger revenue (£M)	13.9	12.6	11.4	13.5	13.9	14.0	13.8	6.4	10.9	14.6	17.3	17.6	
Number of passengers (millions)	12.6	11.5	11.6	12.6	12.3	11.9	10.5	2.8	6.9	8.4	8.7	9.1	8.6
Customer satisfaction (score)				66.0	82.5	80.0	73.0						
Operating performance – services on time (%)				93.1	96.7	96.5	98.0						
Number of trams	25	25	26	32	32	32	32	32	32	32	32	32	
Notes/sources													

Activities in the financial year 2020/21 were severely reduced by the impact of the coronavirus pandemic.

=== Passenger numbers ===
Detailed passenger journeys since Supertram commenced operations in May 1994 were:

Estimated passenger journeys (in millions) per financial year (to 31 March)
Year	Passenger journeys	Year	Passenger journeys	Year	Passenger journeys	Year	Passenger journeys
1994–95	2.2	2002–03	11.5	2010–11	15.0	2018–19	11.9
1995–96	5.3	2003–04	12.3	2011–12	15.0	2019–20	10.5
1996–97	7.8	2004–05	12.8	2012–13	14.4	2020–21	2.8
1997–98	9.2	2005–06	13.1	2013–14	12.6	2021–22	6.9
1998–99	10.4	2006–07	14.0	2014–15	11.5	2022–23	8.4
1999–00	10.9	2007–08	14.8	2015–16	11.6	2023–24	8.7
2000–01	11.9	2008–09	15.0	2016–17	12.6	2024–25	9.1
2001–02	11.4	2009–10	14.7	2017–18	12.3		
Estimates from the Department for Transport

== Proposed developments ==
A number of extensions to the Supertram network have been proposed.

In May 2003, the South Yorkshire Passenger Transport Authority announced plans to extend the Supertram network to Hellaby, a suburb of Rotherham; Dore, a suburb of Sheffield; and Ranmoor, Sheffield. None of these extensions have been built.

In August 2008, plans were announced for the trial of diesel-electro hybrid tram trains on a route via Network Rail tracks to Huddersfield via Meadowhall, Barnsley and Penistone. The fleet of five tram trains, costing £9 million was expected to be in operation by the end of 2010 with the whole project costing £24 million for the 37-mile (60 km) route. It was planned that the hourly Northern Rail service from Sheffield to Huddersfield via the Penistone line would be scrapped, being replaced by a more frequent tram service with more stops and a faster service due to the trams' more rapid acceleration. Plans were also announced for a second trial between Rotherham Central and Sheffield at the same time.

The Sheffield to Huddersfield plans were later abandoned in September 2009, although the Sheffield to Rotherham route was to go ahead. The initial plan was to use electric vehicles capable of operating on either 750 V DC or 25 kV 50 Hz AC, via Rotherham Central to a new station at Parkgate. The scheme was estimated to require £15 million, later revised upwards to £18.7 million to build when first proposed, but was eventually expected to cost £75.1 million. The Rotherham route was originally intended to begin operation in 2015, however this date was put back several times until the October 2018 opening date after a series of delays. Part of the delay was due to the transport secretary failing to approve the building of a 150m (164yd) section of track at Tinsley in a timely manner. The Public Accounts Committee (PAC) was critical of Network Rail's initial estimates for the cost of modifications to the route calling them, "wholly unrealistic". The PAC also noted that Network Rail and the Department for Transport could not provide figures on how much money had been spent on a now cancelled line electrification project. Part of the unexpected rise in the cost of creating the route and the delay was due to the need to demolish and rebuild the College Road road over-bridge next to Rotherham Central station. It was thought that the ballast beneath the railway line could have been excavated to provide headroom for the catenary but this proved not to be feasible.

In 2017, the Sheffield City Region invited public consultation on The Sheffield City Region Transport Strategy 2018–2040 policy document (draft for consultation November 2017) in which it was revealed that only 1% of the population used the Supertram network on journeys to work in 2011. The number of passengers on the Supertram network increased from 2 million in the 1994/1995 financial years to over 12 million in the 2016/2017 financial years.

In March 2020 there were plans to re-route the tram line from behind Sheffield station to Sheaf Street as part of a £1.5 billion plan to redevelop the station and surrounding area. It was anticipated that the scheme would be part-funded by the High Speed 2 (Phase 2b east) Sheffield link, cancelled in 2021.

In April 2022, the Sheffield Green Party unveiled their plans for the system, with extensions planned across South Yorkshire.

In September 2023, Rotherham Council proposed a new railway station and tram stop in the Parkgate area.

In March 2024, when the tram was taken back into public ownership, it was revealed that talks were in progress about extending the network to Stocksbridge, Barrow Hill and Chesterfield with an emphasis on the routes serving hospitals. At the same time it was announced that the trams and stations would be deep cleaned within 100 days of commencement of public ownership. It was also revealed that the tram fleet would undergo refurbishment by 2027 and, subject to government funding, a new fleet of trams would be introduced by 2032.

== Accidents and incidents ==
- In 1995, engineer William Roe suffered severe brain damage after his car skidded on wet tram tracks and crashed into a metal pole. Supertram were made to award Roe compensation for failing to ensure that the rails were level with the adjacent road surface, and for the lack of warning signs indicating that the tracks are hazardous when wet. It was reported there were 53 accidents involving Supertram in Sheffield between 1994 and 1997, including two fatalities and 12 serious injuries.
- On 7 March 2003, a man died from serious head injuries after he was hit by a tram whilst lying on the tracks.
- On 27 October 2005, a pedestrian was killed after stepping in front of an approaching tram.
- On 20 September 2008, a 75-year-old woman was seriously injured when she fell and was subsequently struck by a tram while it was arriving at the local tram stop. The woman was removed and transferred to the Northern General Hospital, suffering from head injuries, a fractured pelvis, and a broken leg.
- On 22 October 2015, trams 120 and 118 collided at Shalesmoor. This resulted in the two damaged sections of both trams requiring major repairs, whilst the undamaged parts of trams 120 and 118 were put together and painted in a version of the original Sheffield Tramways cream and blue livery to re-create the original 120. Tram 118 returned to service a year later in October 2016.
- In November 2016, teacher Terry Orwin sustained serious head injuries from crashing while riding a bicycle on Langsett Road and being caught by the tram tracks.
- On 22 December 2016, Saleh Qassim Saleh, 81, was killed in a collision with a tram. The driver was charged with causing death by careless driving.
- On 8 June 2017, trams 107 and 123 were involved in a low-speed collision at Halfway.
- On 19 July 2018, a passenger was injured when they were thrown across the tram as a result of the tram overspeeding at Middlewood Road and then braking suddenly. The impact of the passenger with a door caused the door to open.
- On 25 October 2018, the day the Tram-train service launched, a lorry collided with one such tram at approximately 3.30 pm on Staniforth Road, near the Woodbourn Road station, derailing the tram-train. Three people were injured with two being treated on site and one taken to hospital. Initial reports indicate that the lorry pulled across the path of the Tram-train. On 12 August 2019, lorry driver Kevin Hague, 61, of Rotherham admitted driving through a red light at Sheffield Magistrates' Court. The BBC reported, 'In a personal impact statement read to the court the driver of the tram-train said he was thankful he was in one of the new £4 million vehicles. They are built to higher crash-worthiness standards as they also run on Network Rail tracks.'
- On 30 November 2018, a car collided with a tram-train at approximately 4.30 pm on Staniforth Road.
- On 22 May 2019, a man was hit by a tram shortly after having an argument with two men. He later died on 26 May 2019 and was named as Martin Rigg. A man was arrested on suspicion of murder on 1 June 2019.
- On 23 July 2021, tram 105 was derailed in a collision with a lorry on Cricket Inn Road. One person was taken to hospital with minor injuries.
- On 11 April 2022, tram 121 crashed into a police van near Leppings Lane. The van driver was taken to hospital with a broken leg.
- On 22 June 2025, two teenage athletes were injured, one seriously, on a footpath crossing the track by Staniforth Road. They had run into the path of a tram that they hadn't realised was approaching.
- On 23 August 2026 the Blue Route was closed after a mine shaft or well was found under the track on Birley Lane. As of October 2026, the route is suspended, no firm date has been given for reopening as the extent of the underground working has not been determined. A replacement bus service is in operation from Gleadless Townend and Halfway.

== In popular culture ==
The tram features in the British children's television series, Teletubbies, episode number 148 in season two, aired April 1998, titled "My Dad's a Tram Driver". Becky sits up front with her dad, looks at the tram's buttons, and calls out Donetsk Way as the next stop, which features at the end of the segment.

== See also ==
- Light Rail Transit Association
- List of town tramway systems in England
- List of town tramway systems in the United Kingdom
