= British Rail Class 399 =

Class of tram-train vehicles

British Rail Class 399 Citylink
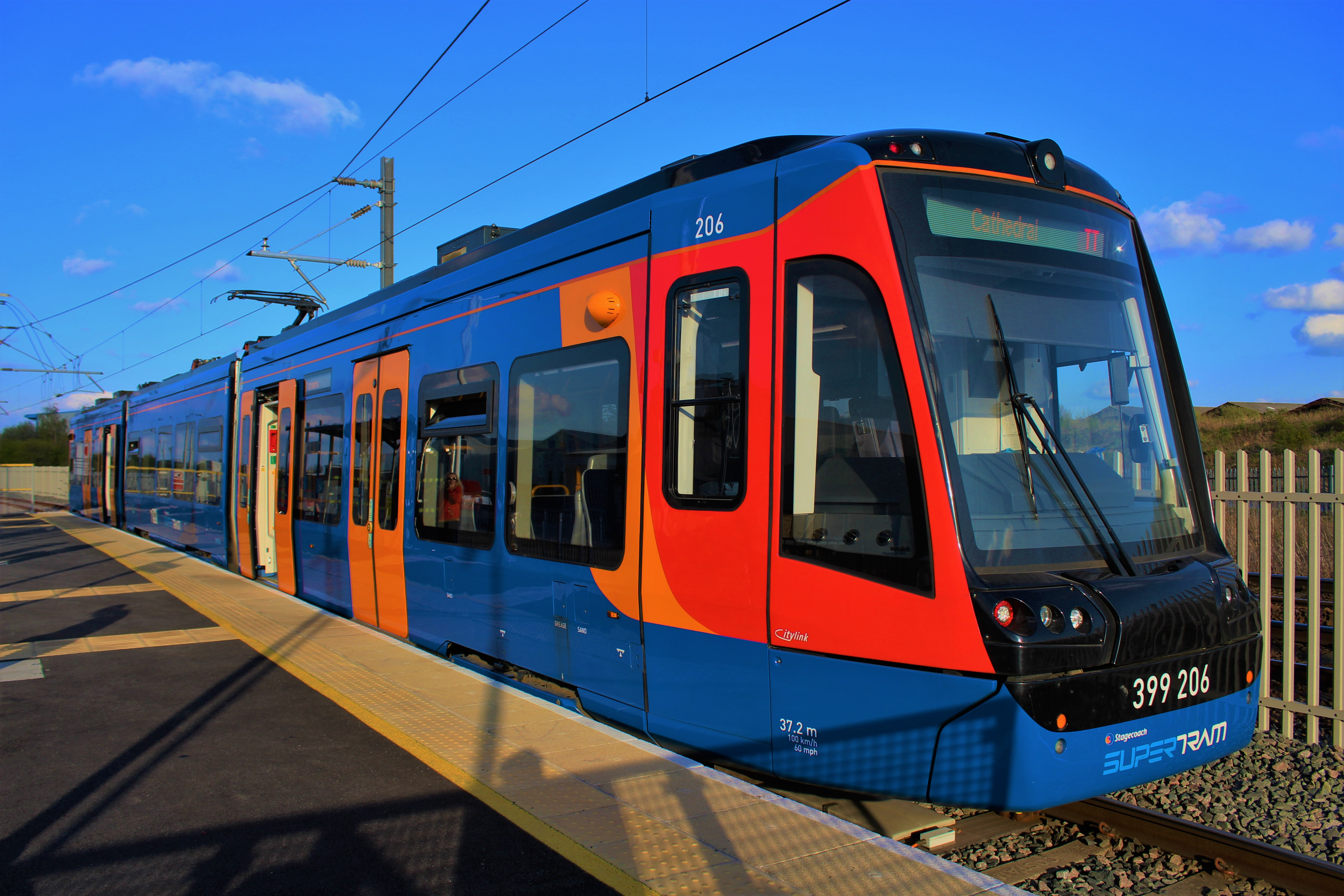
- Class 399 at Parkgate in 2019
- In service: 14 September 2017–present
- Manufacturer: Vossloh España
- Built at: Valencia, Spain
- Family name: Citylink
- Constructed: 2014–2015
- Number built: 7
- Fleet numbers: 399201–399207
- Capacity: 236 (96 seated, 140 standing)
- Operator: Sheffield Supertram
- Depot: Nunnery (Sheffield)
- Lines served: Supertram network, Dearne Valley line

Specifications
- Car body construction: Stainless steel
- Train length: 37.200 m (122 ft 0.6 in)
- Width: 2.650 m (8 ft 8.3 in)
- Height: 3.720 m (12 ft 2.5 in)
- Floor height: 425 mm (1 ft 4.7 in) at doors
- Doors: Double-leaf sliding plug, 2 per side per end section
- Articulated sections: 3
- Wheel diameter: 720 mm (28 in)
- Maximum speed: 62 mph (100 km/h)
- Weight: Approx. 66 t (65 LT; 73 ST)
- Steep gradient: 10%
- Traction system: ABB BORDLINE CC400 MS_25kV-750V_R_400 IGBT-VVVF
- Traction motors: 6 × 145 kW (194 hp)
- Power output: 870 kW (1,170 hp)
- Acceleration: 1.15 m/s^{2} (2.6 mph/s)
- Deceleration: Service: 1.2 m/s^{2} (2.7 mph/s); Emergency: 2.67 m/s^{2} (6.0 mph/s)
- Electric systems: 750 V DC and 25 kV 50 Hz AC overhead line
- Current collection: Pantograph
- UIC classification: Bo′+2′Bo′+Bo′
- Minimum turning radius: Horizontal: 22 m (72 ft); Vertical: 165 m (540 ft)
- Safety systems: AWS; TPWS
- Track gauge: 1,435 mm (4 ft 8 1/2 in) standard gauge

Notes/references
- Sourced from unless otherwise noted.

The British Rail Class 399 Citylink is a type of rail vehicle built by Vossloh on its Citylink platform for operation by South Yorkshire Supertram. Primarily a low-floor tram, it is also capable of being used on the National Rail network; the Class 399 is the first such tram-train to see operational use in the United Kingdom.

In 2013, an order was placed with Vossloh for the construction of a batch of seven tram-trains for Supertram. It operates as a pioneering tram-train hybrid vehicle as part of an initial pilot of the operation of such vehicles. The launch of live services using the Class 399 was repeatedly delayed, reportedly due to planning and development-related difficulty experienced by Network Rail, who were responsible for the installation of additional track and other infrastructure-related changes to accommodate the tram-trains upon the heavy rail network, as well as a necessary full track replacement programme performed by Supertram.

In January 2016, the first tram-train commenced live testing on the Supertram network. The type first entered passenger service on 14 September 2017, but were initially restricted to only some sections of Supertram's network as further work was still required on other parts, including Network Rail lines. Full tram-train service began on 25 October 2018.

== History ==
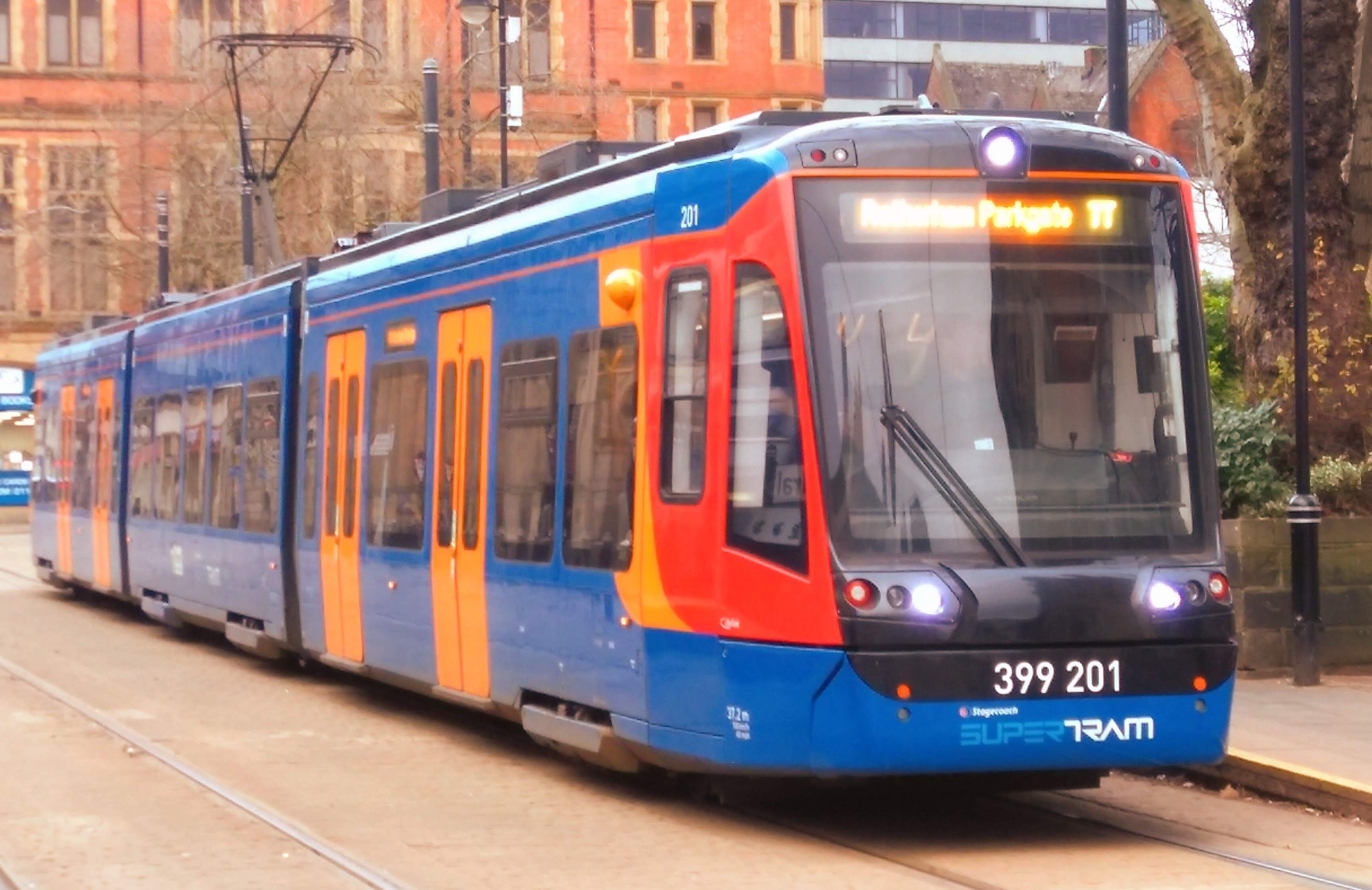
Class 399 at Cathedral tram stop

=== Background ===
In 2008, the Department for Transport (DfT) announced plans to operate a trial tram-train service using the Penistone line in South Yorkshire. As initially envisioned, the trial was to function as two-year pilot programme, as the service would be the first use of combined tram-train operations anywhere in the UK. The scheme was jointly delivered by the DfT, Sheffield Supertram, Network Rail, Northern Rail, and the South Yorkshire Passenger Transport Executive (SYPTE). The adoption of tram-trains would allow Supertram services to travel on the national rail network, which had the advantages of opening up new routes, integrating multiple transit networks together, and potential for further expansion.

In addition to the local impact of the scheme, it was anticipated that the trial could have been invaluable to transport operators through the United Kingdom. Careful scrutiny was to be applied to the service's reliability and popularity; in the long run, the determined level of success could have been a decisive factor on the further implementation of tram-train technology across the country. According to Rob Carroll, major projects manager at Supertram, the tram-train project team had been approached by multiple organisations; he highlighted the interest expressed by representatives of the Manchester Metrolink, transport managers studying options for a rail link to Glasgow Airport, and personnel from South Wales. The prospect of being able to readily combine heavy and light rail networks together is considered to be an attractive prospect in some cities.

=== Planning and selection ===
The originally intended route for the tram-train trials was an unelectrified line and as such, this would have required the procurement of a number of specially built vehicles due to the necessitity for them to be diesel powered, as there were no plans to include electrification as part of the trial. Originally, the trial was intended to start operating for two years from 2010, but in 2009, the proposal was revised as the original plan had not included any on-street running. The revised proposal envisaged the use of the Supertram network, using a new link constructed to connect it to the Dearne Valley line to Rotherham, that would then allow trams to operate on both heavy rail and light rail lines. As part of the project, the line would be electrified, allowing more cost-effective electric vehicles to be procured. In May 2012, approval for the tram-train trial was granted by the DfT, along with a commitment of £58 million towards the construction of a 400-metre (1,300 ft) chord to serve as the link between the Network Rail and Supertram networks, as well as the electrification of 8 miles (13 km) of the route to Rotherham and the purchase of seven new tram-train vehicles.

In June 2013, Vossloh España was selected to construct the new tram-trains with the first scheduled to be delivered in September 2015. Under Supertram's numbering system, the seven units were numbered 201–207. In order to operate onto the mainline railway network, they were additionally registered as Class 399 units 399201–399207 under the TOPS scheme. The first was delivered in December 2015. The last was delivered in November 2016.

=== Delays and issues ===
The tram-train service was delayed many times due to different factors. While the first deliveries of the tram-trains themselves were due to happen in September 2015, this deadline was subsequently put back to December 2015. In October 2015, it was announced that the tram-train project had been delayed by one year. A Network Rail spokesperson stated at the time that the project would be delayed until 2017, and attributed this to the organisation having to wait for the needed permission of the transport secretary to carry out the construction of new track at Tinsley.

In May 2016, the project was effectively delayed once again when it was announced that a 2017 start date would "not be possible". Speaking at the time, Network Rail referred to the complexity present in elements of the design and planning of the envisioned tram-train operations, and that a thorough review of the programme was in the process of being conducted by the organisation and SYPTE. Amongst the various changes required in advance of the new unit's operational use, the entirety of the Supertram network had to be re-profiled. In November 2016, while in the midst of a review of the associated programme of works, it was announced that full tram-train services would commence in summer 2018, having encountered factors which had necessitated yet another delay.

In December 2017, a highly-critical parliamentary report on the developing tram-train programme was released. According to the report, costs had risen to £75.1 million, around five times of the original £15 million budget originally allocated for the programme. It also found there to have been a "high level of risk and uncertainty" and ""unacceptable cost increases and delays", while the DfT were criticised for failing to question if the project still offered value for money or fulfilled its goals.

== Design ==
The Class 399 is a dedicated tram-train unit. The primary purpose of the type is to operate the tram-train service between Sheffield and Rotherham; as such, it is designed to run on both the National Rail and Supertram networks. Each vehicle is composed of three articulated sections, which are fitted with a total of three motorised bogies and one unpowered trailer bogie, complete with a pneumatic suspension system. They are bi-directional units, which eliminates any need for turnaround facilities to be installed; rear-view camera displays are also present in the driver's cab for improved visibility and situational awareness.

To suit the two different networks, the Class 399 are dual voltage vehicles, capable of operating on both the 750 V DC OHLE of Supertram's network, and the 25 kV 50 Hz AC OHLE that is the standard on the National Rail network. Although the route to Rotherham will be electrified to the 750 V DC standard used on the rest of the Supertram network, the installation of dual voltage capability is to allow the vehicles to be future-proofed if the Midland Main Line north of Sheffield is electrified. The process for switching between the Supertram power supply and the Network Rail power supply is automated by an integrated Automatic Power Control (APC) system. This system is triggered by a series of magnets embedded at key locations on the ground outside of the track, while the two power supplies are intentionally separated by a neutral section of track. In practice, the vehicle travels over the first magnet to trigger the circuit breakers to open, after which it coasts through the short neutral section before the new voltage is detected and the circuit breakers are closed again. While the APC provides an automated process for this, there is a manual override allowing the driver to close the circuit breaker if circumstance ever requires this to be done.

The Supertram lines and the National Rail network also use vastly different signalling systems. When travelling on the Supertram network, signals are primarily provided to the driver visually; the tram-trains also make use of the same vehicle identification system (VIS) as used by the conventional trams. In addition, for compatibility with running upon the National Rail network, the tram-trains are fitted with Train Protection & Warning System (TPWS) and GSM-R equipment. While TPWS is to be active during all operations, manual intervention by the driver is required for the activation of the GSM-R terminal each time one of the vehicles is driven onto the heavy rail line.

In order for the vehicle to be capable of running on both on-street tramways and the National Rail network, the profile of the wheels were required to suit the particularities of the rails on both systems. The design team collaborated with the University of Huddersfield, to develop a specially designed wheel that fits both rail head profiles, which is claimed to reduce the rate of wear and mitigate against the risk of derailment. However, as the wheel profile was non-standard, permission had to be obtained from the Rail Safety and Standards Board before the new design could be adopted and subject to real-world testing. As a result of the vehicles being operated upon a heavy rail line, they are subject to higher crashworthiness standards than had been imposed upon the rest of Supertram's fleet. As a result, these units are the only ones capable of operating the tram-train service to Rotherham.

== Operation ==
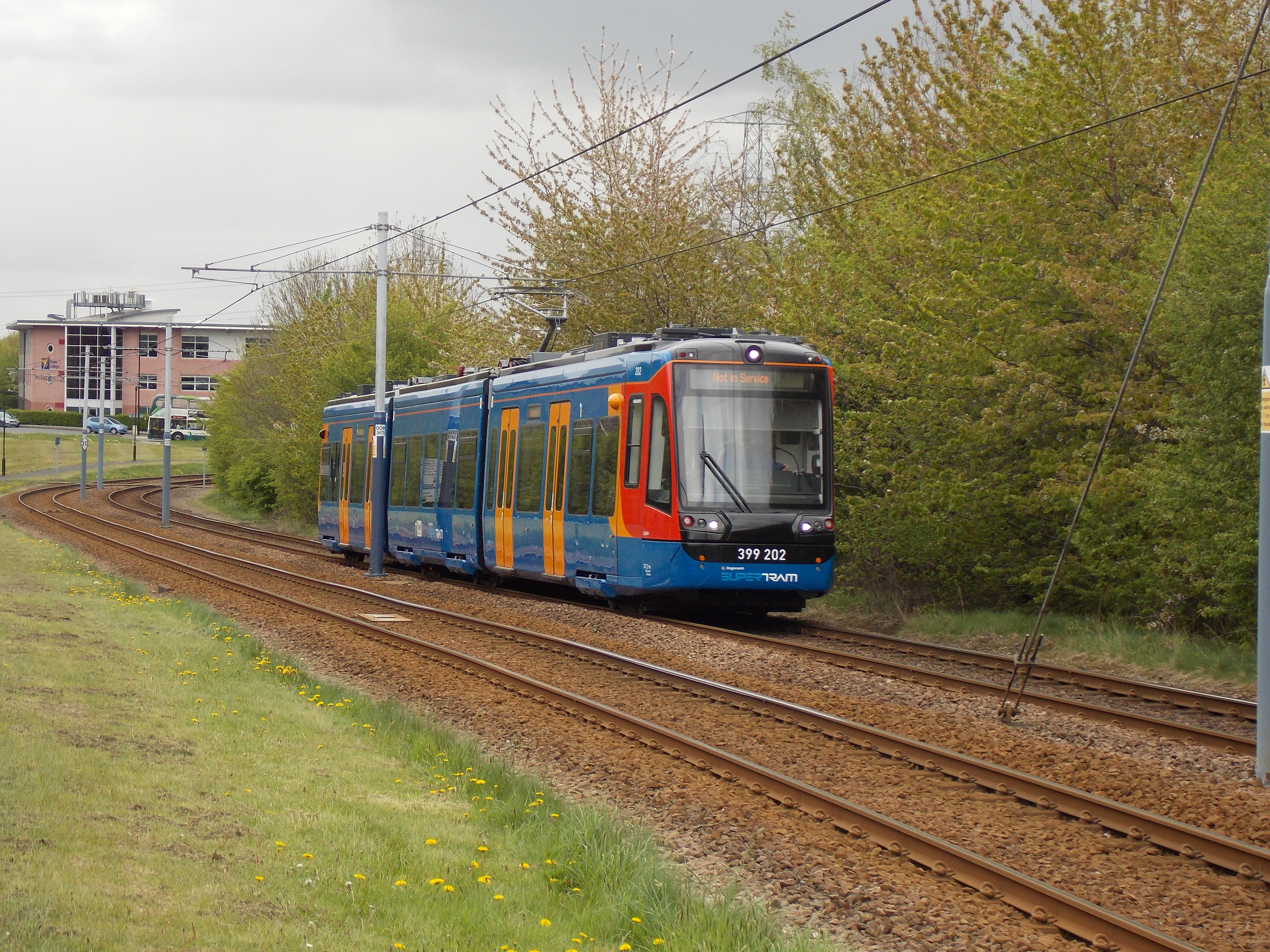
Being tested at Donetsk Way, 2017

In January 2016, the first tram-train commenced active testing on the Supertram network. On 14 September 2017, the first Class 399 officially entered passenger service in a ceremony attended by the Parliamentary Under-Secretary of State for Transport Paul Maynard and various transport officials and representatives from Sheffield Children's Hospital. Tram 399202 was named Theo, after the mascot of the city's children's hospital charity; in addition, tram passengers who travelled over the next two days made donations to the charity in place of the standard fare.

In addition to their tram-train functionality, the fleet has also been used to strengthen Supertram's existing assets, which has not been previously expanded since having been originally commissioned in 1992. The vehicles have been fully integrated into Supertram's fleet, and are maintained by the manufacturer at the main Nunnery depot. The Rotherham service operates three times per hour between Cathedral and Rotherham Central, before terminating at a new stop at Rotherham's Parkgate retail park, with a total journey time of approximately 25 minutes. A total of three vehicles will be required for this service level; three of the remainder will be used to increase capacity on the rest of the network, with the seventh in maintenance.

Initially however, four of the seven vehicles will be dedicated to the Rotherham service, with the other three used for fleet expansion. This is owing to the different wheel profile required for running on National Rail tracks as opposed to Supertram's own. This is envisaged to be the case until Supertram has completed its full track replacement programme. In May 2018, testing began on the tram-train aspects of the vehicle itself. The full Rotherham service started running on 25 October 2018.

== Incidents ==
- On 25 October 2018, unit 399204 was badly damaged after hitting a lorry near Woodbourn Road tram stop.
- On 30 November 2018, unit 399202 was damaged in a collision with a car at the same junction as the previous collision.
- On 9 April 2019 a fault was found on the Class 399 units and they were withdrawn to undergo safety checks. Tram-train service was suspended, but resumed during the next day. Work to refit the bogie covers which were removed continued until 11 June 2019.
- On 14 December 2019 the fleet was withdrawn from service on the advice of Stadler, the acquirer of original manufacturer Vossloh, as a result of a hydraulics issue. Services resumed on 17 December 2019.

== Fleet status ==
Number	Name	Status	Wheel Profile	Notes
399201	-	Operational	Tram-Train	
399202	Theo	Operational	Tram-Train	
399203	-	Operational	Tram-Train	
399204	-	Operational	Tram-Train	Returned from Spain in November 2019, returned to service 18 January 2020
399205	-	Operational	Tram-Train	
399206	-	Operational	Tram	Refitted with tram wheel profile and re-entered service on tram only services in September 2020
399207	-	Operational	Tram	

== See also ==
- British Rail Class 398, related Stadler Citylink tram-trains built in the 2020s for Transport for Wales Rail
