= City Goods station =

Goods station in South Yorkshire, England

City Goods

General information
- Location: Sheffield, City of Sheffield; England
- Coordinates: 53.383770°N 1.459500°W
- Grid reference: SK360875

Other information
- Status: Disused
Location

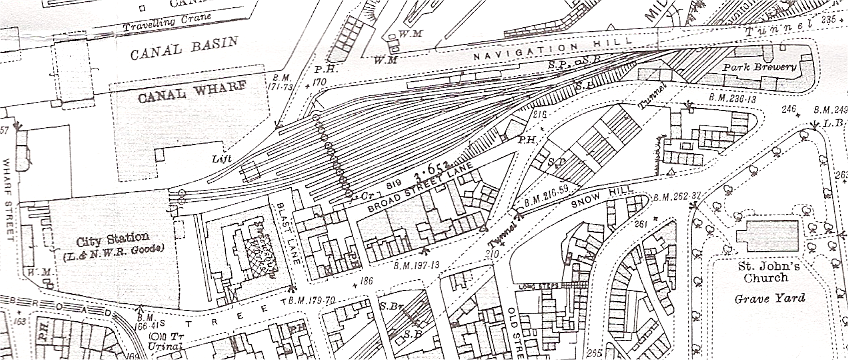
City Goods station trackplan

City Goods Station (also known as Wharf Street Goods Depot) was a goods station, in Sheffield, Yorkshire belonging to the London and North Western Railway, after Nationalisation it came under the auspices of British Railways.

The London and North Western Railway presence in Sheffield began in 1895 when it opened a small goods station on Bernard Road. The company opened a 3/4-mile (1.2 km) branch eastwards from Woodburn Junction to what was then called their Sheffield City Goods terminal on Bernard Road. Its first line in the steel city was inadequate in the eyes of the LNWR as it was buried under its rivals' network of lines. The company obtained powers to build a more suitable establishment.

The site chosen was at the corner of Broad Street and Wharf Street, behind the Corn Exchange, 3/4 mile (1.2 km) west of their terminus on Bernard Road. A tunnel under the Nunnery Colliery goods line was necessary as well as a bridge above the Midland Main Line (MML), just north of Midland station. The exit of the tunnel was directly above the MML and connected to a bridge above the main railway line. It then continued west to the depot on red brick arches. The depot building itself was three storeys high and covered 94,260 square feet (8,757 m^{2}); it possessed two 20-long-ton (22-short-ton; 20 t) hydraulic lifts capable of carrying 10-long-ton (11-short-ton; 10 t) wagons down to the basement (actually at street level). The yard opened in February 1903 and Bernard Road depot was kept open to deal with heavier loads.

To avoid confusion, Bernard Road goods was renamed Nunnery Goods and the title of City Goods passed on to the new goods yard.

The depot closed on 12 July 1965 when a large new freight transshipment and engine depot opened at Grimesthorpe.

== Bibliography ==
- Rail centres n°11: Sheffield. S.R. Batty. pp. 44–45
