= Siemens-Duewag Supertram =

Type of tram operating on South Yorkshire Supertram system

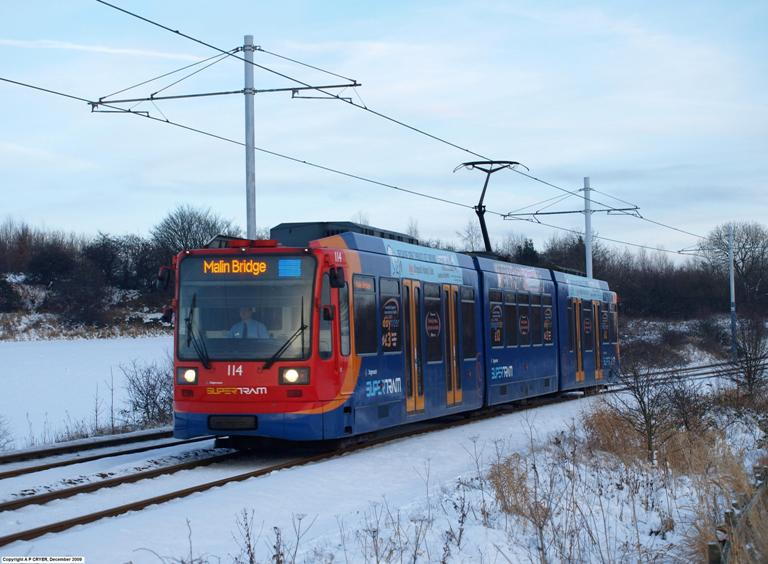
- Supertram 114
- In service: 1994–present
- Manufacturer: Siemens–Duewag
- Built at: Düsseldorf, Germany
- Constructed: 1992
- Refurbished: 2006–2009
- Number built: 25
- Number in service: 24
- Fleet numbers: 101–125 (originally 01–25)
- Capacity: 86 seats, 155 standing per tram
- Operator: South Yorkshire Supertram

Specifications
- Car body construction: Steel
- Car length: 34.75 m (114 ft 0 in)
- Width: 2.65 m (8 ft 8 in)
- Height: 3,645 mm (11 ft 11 1/2 in)
- Floor height: 450–880 mm (1 ft 6 in – 2 ft 11 in)
- Platform height: 450 mm (1 ft 6 in)
- Articulated sections: 3 (two articulations)
- Wheel diameter: 670–588 mm (26.4–23.1 in) (new–worn)
- Wheelbase: 1,800 mm (5 ft 11 in)
- Maximum speed: 80 km/h (50 mph)
- Weight: 52 t (51 long tons; 57 short tons) (tare)
- Traction system: GTO armature chopper
- Traction motors: 4 × 1KB2121 277 kW (371 hp) (Note: 1-hour rating) DC motor
- Power output: 1,108 kW (1,486 hp)
- Gear ratio: 4.833 : 1
- Acceleration: 1.3 m/s^{2} (4.3 ft/s^{2})
- Deceleration: 1.5 m/s^{2} (4.9 ft/s^{2}) (service; design); 1.16 m/s^{2} (3.8 ft/s^{2}) (service; limited); 3 m/s^{2} (9.8 ft/s^{2}) (emergency; design); 2.46 m/s^{2} (8.1 ft/s^{2}) (emergency; limited)
- Electric systems: 750 V DC (nominal) from overhead catenary
- Current collection: Brecknell Willis high reach pantograph
- UIC classification: B′+B′B′+B′
- Braking systems: Electrical brake (combined regenerative and rheostatic brake) spring-applied pneumatic brake (stand-by and parking brake), track brake
- Track gauge: 1,435 mm (4 ft 8 1/2 in) standard gauge

The Siemens-Duewag Supertram is a fleet of 25 trams built by Siemens-Duewag of Düsseldorf, Germany in 1992 for use on the South Yorkshire Supertram light rail network in England. They were the only trams in use on the network until the entry into service of British Rail Class 399 tram-trains in 2017. As of October 2025, 24 units of the fleet are operational.

== History ==
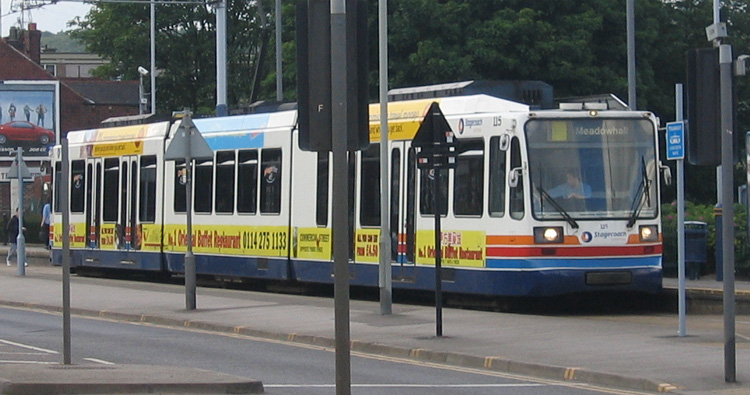
On street running at the Middlewood terminus

After undergoing trials on Düsseldorf's Rheinbahn system, the trams were delivered to Sheffield via the Rotterdam-Immingham cargo ship route. The trams are bidirectional and consist of three articulated carriages with a low-floor area of 40%. All four entrances are at 42 cm (16.5 in) low level matching the height of the platforms to provide level access. The low-floor areas have limited seating and provide space for pushchairs and wheel chairs. The high floor areas are 88 cm (34.6 in) high and can be found at the outer-end of each end carriage and in the centre carriage; they are reached by either two or three steps.

Because the Supertram network includes gradients up to 10%, all vehicle axles are motorised, which limits the low-floor area to that between the bogies. For maximised low floor area, the middle bogies are installed entirely below the centre carriage section rather than under the articulations. The wheels are type Bochum 84, have resilient rubber inserts and have a diameter of 67 cm (26.4 in). They may be worn to a diameter of at least 59 cm (23.2 in).

There are four monomotor bogies, each powered by a longitudinally suspended DC motor driving both axles. The power supply is 750 V DC from overhead lines using a Brecknell Willis high reach pantograph. Speed is controlled from the cab by a joystick controller with a Dead man's switch, which must be held in place to keep the track brakes from automatically applying. No other vigilance control is fitted, because of the perceived safety of a system of street-running trams. Drivers are seated on sprung seats for comfort and a public address system allows them to communicate with passengers.

The vehicle interior is designed to meet safety requirements. The interior fittings have no sharp edges to prevent any injury and there are numerous grab rails for standing passengers. The interior lining of the ceiling consists of aluminium honeycomb bonded with melamine coloured resin. The lining is attached to suspension points welded to the roof section. The inside walls are made from coloured melamine material. The complete lining for the articulations consists of coloured fibreglass. The rear wall of the driving cab is made of laminated wood with a melamine veneer.

Passengers have 86 upholstered seats, mostly arranged face to face. The low floor areas possess minimum seating to provide space for wheelchairs in accordance with the requirements of the DPTAC. Studies were carried out by the Cranfield Institute of Technology to ensure that all members of the public may have access to the vehicles.

From September 2005, the trams' manual destination boards were changed to multicolour LED signs conforming with the Disability Discrimination Act 1995 (DDA), whilst pre-recorded next stop announcements were introduced to replace announcements made by drivers. Three voices with local accents were chosen to record the destination messages on the three different tram lines.

All trams were refurbished between January 2006 and February 2009, with the first refurbished tram being launched at Supertram's Nunnery depot on 27 January 2006. The refurbishment bought the trams to conform to the Disability Discrimination Act inside, whilst also repainting the trams into new Stagecoach corporate colours, finished in a blue livery similar to that of South West Trains.

In May 2009 the second part of the refresh programme began, which was an overhaul of the tram's under-floor running equipment. It lasted until the end of 2012 and meant that one tram was once again permanently unavailable for service, and the system therefore continued to operate with 23 trams out of an 'available for service' fleet of 25.

== Liveries ==
The initial tram livery was overall light grey with a dark blue skirt and Supertram fleetnames. A minor modification appeared just prior to the Stagecoach Group rebranding, when the current motto was added to the centre car in large letters under the windows.

Following the Stagecoach being awarded the operating franchise in 1997, the trams were rebranded into the corporate Stagecoach identity, a white base with three stripes, with a Stagecoach fleet name and SUPERTRAM strapline, in line with their UK bus fleet. Later, as the bus fleets were given a new livery, a dark blue base was added under the orange, red and blue stripes.

Between January 2006 and January 2009 the entire fleet was refurbished internally as part of the 'refresh programme'. In parallel, the tram livery was rebranded to the current scheme, a predominantly blue livery and more prominent logo and a smaller subordinate Stagecoach identifier. This was loosely based on the blue version of the South West Trains corporate Stagecoach livery. Before and after images of the refresh are available on the operator's website.

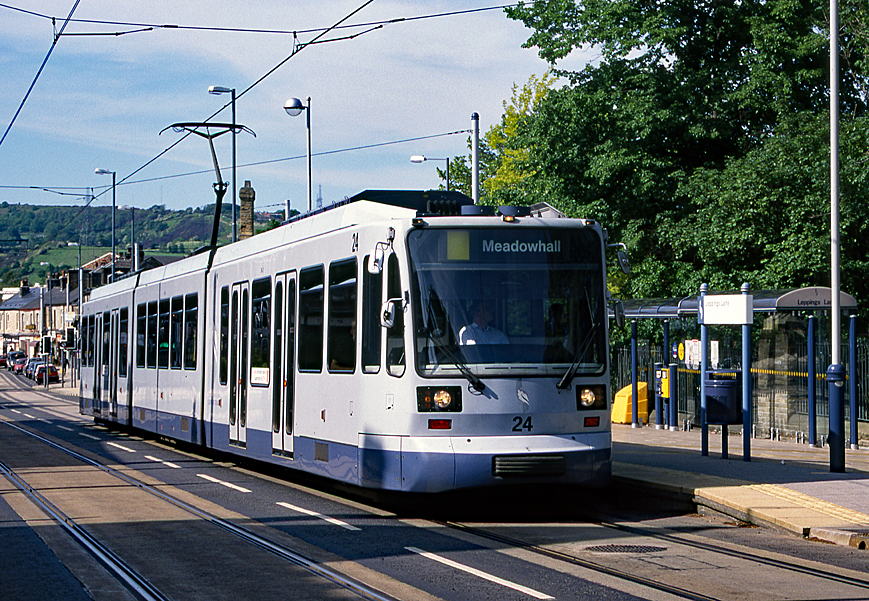
Original pre-privatisation livery

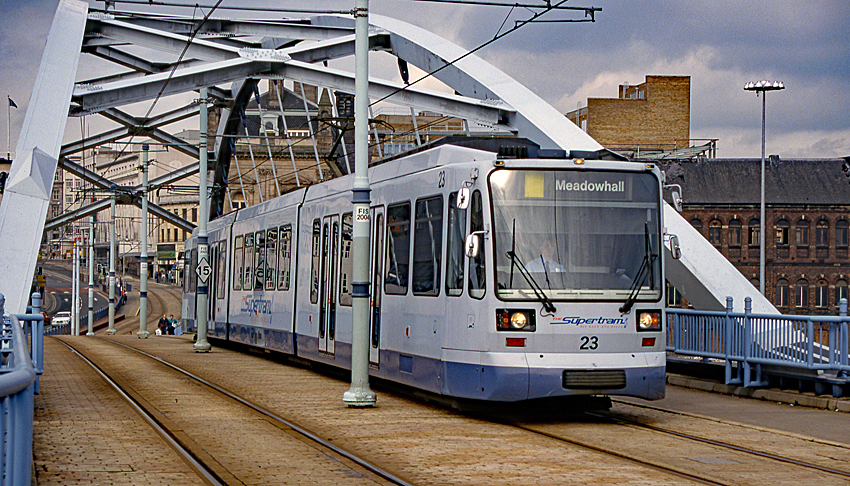
Modified livery with Supertram branding

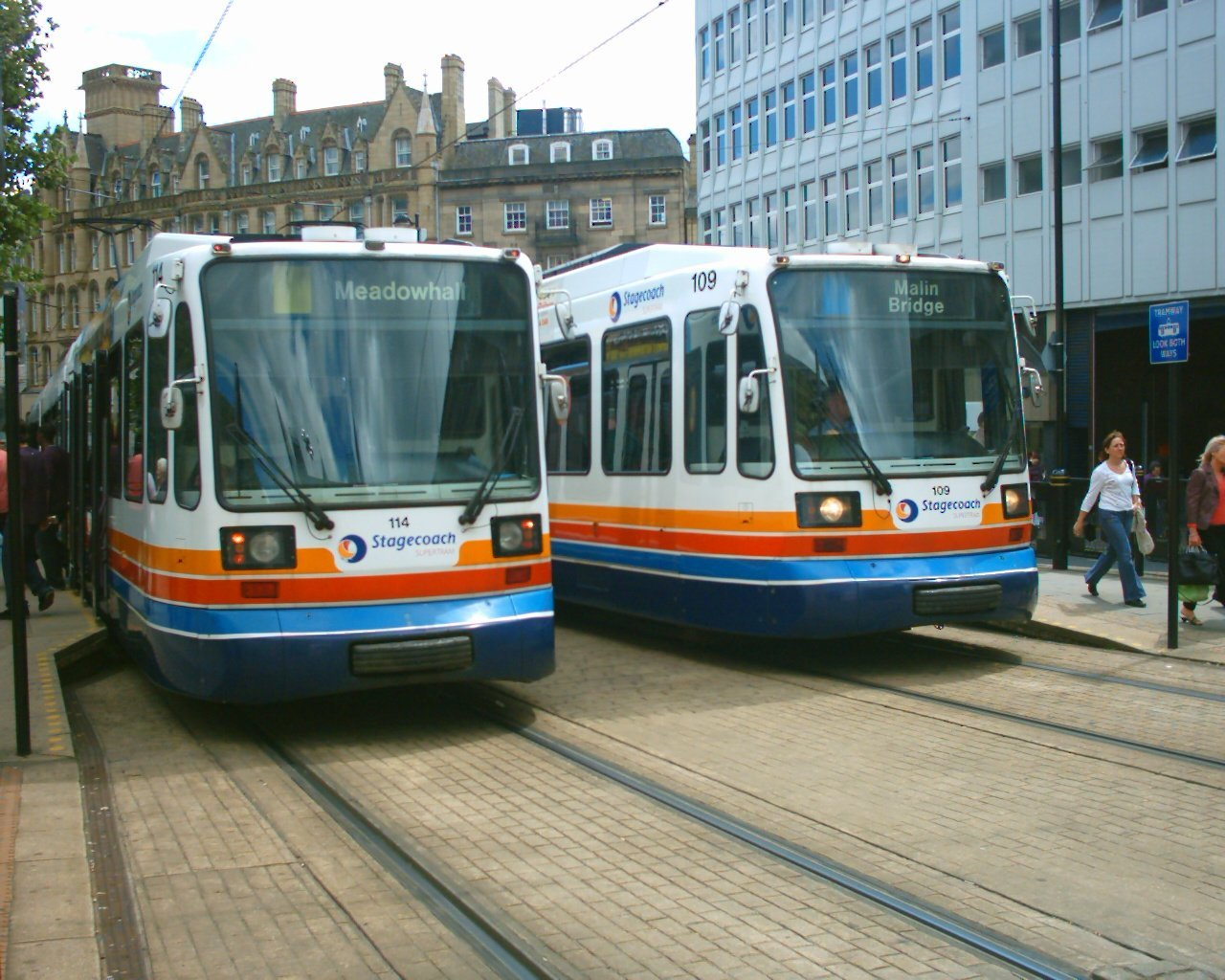
Stagecoach corporate livery, 1997 - 2006

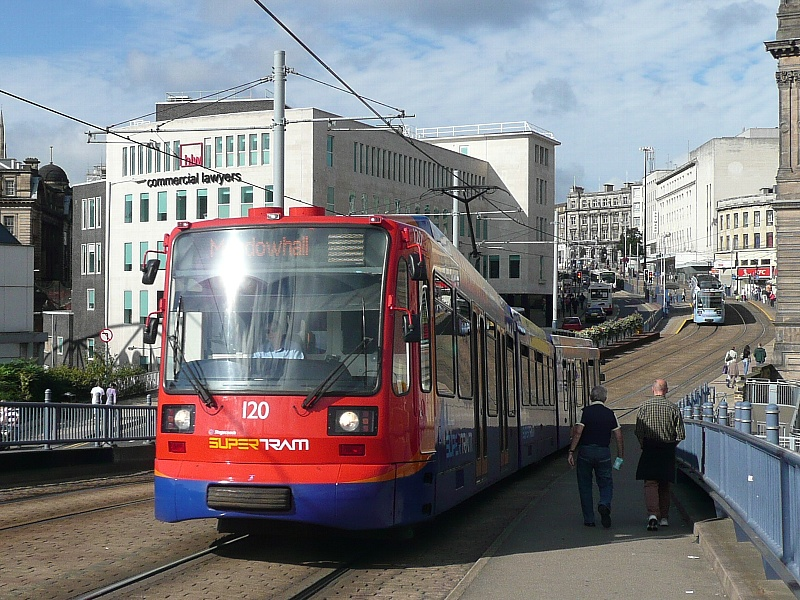
Stagecoach dedicated supertram livery, 2006–present

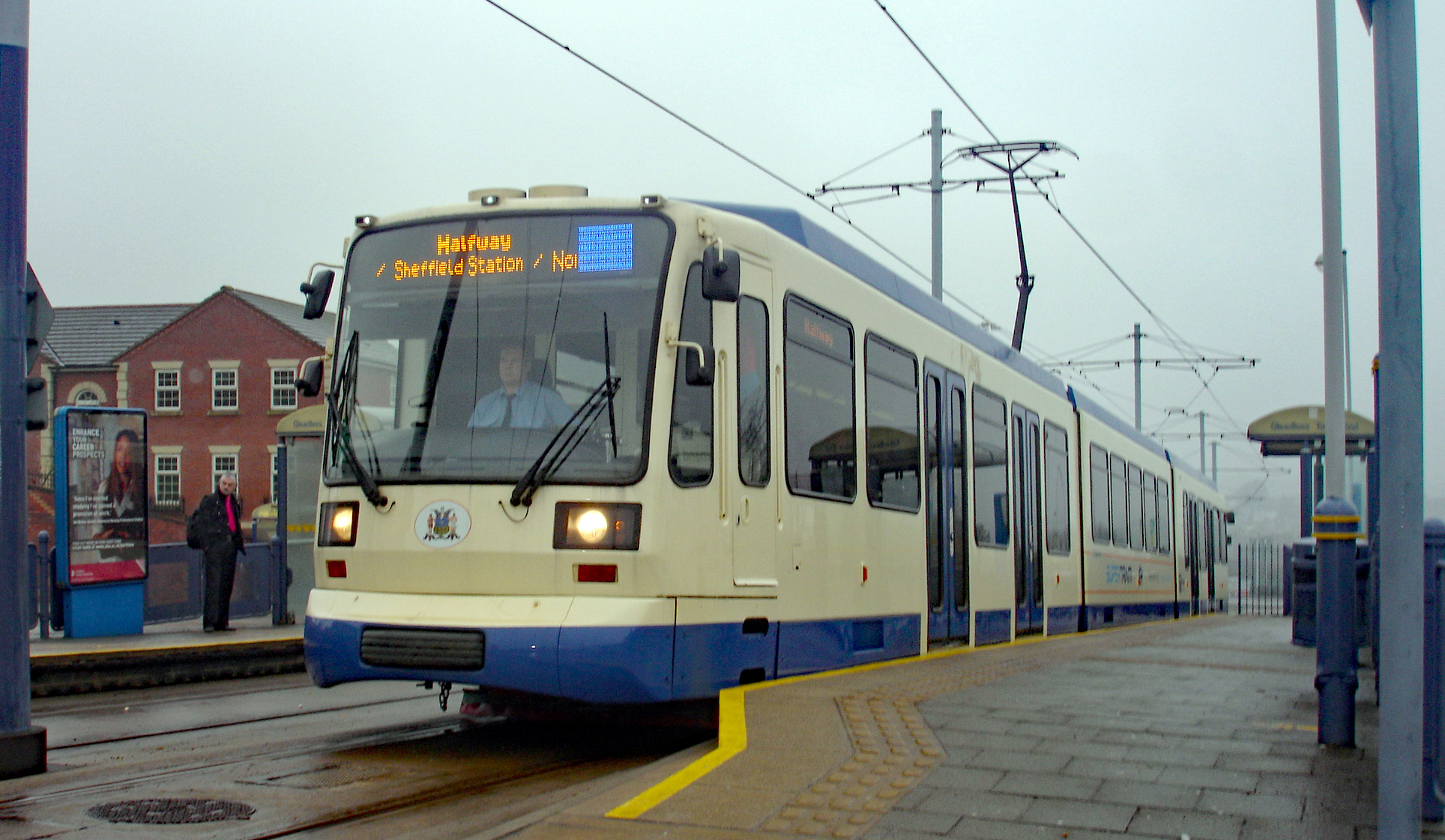
Bluebell & snowdrop livery inspired by the Prussian blue and cream livery of Sheffield Tramway

In addition to the standard liveries, a number of all over advertising schemes have been used on individual trams for places such as the Meadowhall Centre, a jobs website, sister Stagecoach company East Midlands Trains, the new Sheffield IKEA store, Doncaster Sheffield Airport, XPO Logistics and fashion website PrettyLittleThing.

Since 2010, tram 120 has featured a non-standard livery to mark the 50th anniversary of the closure of the former tram network and to celebrate the influence of the trams on the city. The design featured a similar blue and cream colour scheme as used on the original Sheffield Tramway, the Sheffield City coat of arms and removal of the external advertisements. Tram 120 has since been repainted and no longer carries this livery.
