= Listed buildings in Eckington, Derbyshire =

Eckington is a civil parish in the North East Derbyshire district of Derbyshire, England. The parish contains 82 listed buildings that are recorded in the National Heritage List for England. Of these, two are listed at Grade I, the highest of the three grades, two are at Grade II*, the middle grade, and the others are at Grade II, the lowest grade. The parish contains the town of Eckington, the villages of Renishaw, Ridgeway, and Spinkhill, the hamlet of Birley Hay, and the surrounding countryside. The major building in the parish is the country house, Renishaw Hall, which is listed, together with associated structures and items in its grounds. Most of the other listed buildings are houses, cottages and associated structures, farmhouses and farm buildings. The rest of the listed buildings include churches, chapels and associated items, a former Sunday school, a former toll house, a public house, a war memorial and two bridges.

== Key ==
| Grade | Criteria |
|---|---|
| I | Buildings of exceptional interest, sometimes considered to be internationally important |
| II* | Particularly important buildings of more than special interest |
| II | Buildings of national importance and special interest |

== Buildings ==
| Name and location | Photograph | Date | Notes | Grade |
|---|---|---|---|---|
| St Peter and St Paul's Church, Eckington; 53.31327°N 1.35304°W | | 12th century | The church, which has been altered and extended through the centuries, is in sandstone with roofs of Welsh slate, stone slate and sheet metal. It consists of a nave with a clerestory, north and south aisles, a south porch, a chancel with a north vestry and organ chamber, and a west steeple. The steeple has a broad tower with three stages, clasping buttresses, moulded string courses, a west doorway with a semicircular arch, lancet windows, a sundial and a clock face on the south side, a plain parapet with moulded coping, and a recessed octagonal spire with lucarnes. | I |
| Barn northwest of Malthouse Farmhouse; 53.31189°N 1.35294°W | — | Late 15th century | The barn, at one time used as a malthouse, and restored in 1985, is in sandstone with quoins, and a pantile roof with stone slate eaves. There is a single storey with overlofts, and an east offshut. The openings include mullioned windows, a doorway, and a double-width opening. Inside, there are cruck trusses. | II |
| 24–28 Market Street, Eckington; 53.31003°N 1.35583°W | — | c. 1500 | A row of shops with a house at the rear, all with a timber framed core, encased in sandstone, mainly roughcast or rendered There have been alterations and additions, including a range of single-storey projecting flat-roofed shop fronts. There are two storeys and attics, four bays, and a gabled extension and a square tower at the rear. | II |
| 28 Church Street, Eckington; 53.31315°N 1.35142°W | — | Early 16th century or earlier | A barn converted for residential use in 1975, it is in sandstone, with quoins, and a pantile roof with coped gables and moulded kneelers. There is a single storey and attics, and four bays. It contains a wide central opening, and four gabled dormers, two with hipped roofs. Inside there are two massive full-height cruck trusses. | II |
| 35 Church Street, Eckington; 53.31080°N 1.35495°W | — | Early 16th century or earlier | A meeting hall, it was converted into a house in the late 16th century, and extended in the 19th century. The house is in sandstone with quoins and a roof of Welsh slate and stone slate. There are two storeys and four bays. The openings have been altered, and are irregular, with evidence of earlier timber-framed windows. | II |
| Outbuilding east of Mansion House Farmhouse; 53.33320°N 1.43203°W | — | 16th century | The outbuilding is in sandstone with a corrugated sheet roof. There is a single storey with lofts, and an offshut to the south. On each front there are three doorways, and inside are two massive cruck trusses. | II |
| Barn at Hazelhurst Farmhouse; 53.32587°N 1.42817°W | — | Late 16th century | The barn is in sandstone with quoins and a stone slate roof. There are five bays, and an offshut to the northwest. Inside, there are massive cruck trusses. | II |
| Barn west of Mansion House Farmhouse; 53.33316°N 1.43260°W | | Late 16th century | The barn is in sandstone with quoins and asbestos sheet roof. There are two storeys, five bays, and a single-storey projection to the south. In the centre is a full-height doorway with a cambered timber lintel, and to the north is a square opening and slit vents. | II |
| Renishaw Hall; 53.30251°N 1.34454°W | | c. 1625 | A country house designed by George Sitwell, and greatly enlarged between 1793 and 1808 by Joseph Badger. It is in sandstone with string courses, embattled parapets, pinnacles, and Welsh slate roofs. There are two and three storeys and an irregular plan, consisting of a central range, later ranges to the east and west, and domestic offices at the west end. The north front has a central range of seven bays and a Gothic entrance porch. The garden front is irregular with eleven bays, and includes a two-storey canted bay window with a balustrade. The windows throughout are sashes. | I |
| Birley Hay Farmhouse; 53.31810°N 1.40468°W | — | Early 17th century | The farmhouse, which was enlarged in the 20th century, is in sandstone with quoins, and a stone slate roof with coped gables and moulded kneelers. There are two storeys, an original range of four bays, and an added cross-wing of four bays. The main doorway has a chamfered quoined surround, and most of the windows are mullioned, some with hood moulds. | II |
| Outbuilding south of Birley Hey Farmhouse; 53.31797°N 1.40436°W | — | Early 17th century | The outbuilding is in sandstone with quoins, and a pantile roof with stone slate eaves. There is a single storey and five bays, the right three bays projecting. Two bays are open, supported by a cast iron column on a former grindstone. Inside the building is a cruck truss. | II |
| Outbuildings southwest of Hazelbarrow Farmhouse; 53.32819°N 1.44843°W | | Early 17th century | The barn and outbuilding are in sandstone, partly rendered, with tile roofs and two storeys. The barn has five bays, and a gabled single-storey range at the rear. In the centre is a double doorway with a quoined surround under a relieving arch, over which is a row of bird openings and perches. The outbuilding to the east contains three quoined doorways in the ground floor and two quoined openings above. | II |
| Mansion House Farmhouse; 53.33321°N 1.43241°W | — | Early 17th century | The farmhouse is in sandstone with quoins, and a stone slate roof with coped gables. There are two storeys and attics, and a T-shaped plan, with a front of two bays, the right bay gabled and projecting. The doorway has a quoined surround and a massive lintel, and the windows are mullioned with hood moulds, and some mullions removed. On the west is a single-story link to the barn. | II |
| Povey Farmhouse; 53.32403°N 1.42358°W | | Early 17th century | The farmhouse is in sandstone on a shallow plinth, with quoins, and a tile roof with coped gables. There are two storeys and an irregular plan, with a T-shaped range to the west, a linking range, and a gabled range to the east. On the front are eight bays. At the west end is a three-storey porch containing a doorway with a quoined surround and a massive lintel. The east end has a doorway with a chamfered surround, and most of the windows in the house are mullioned, some with hood moulds. | II |
| Renishaw Park Golf Clubhouse; 53.30331°N 1.33710°W | — | Early 17th century | A farmhouse later extended, particularly in 1914 by Sir Edwin Lutyens. The original house is in sandstone with quoins, and a tile roof with coped gables and moulded kneelers. There are two storeys, and an L-shaped plan, with a front of five bays, and a projecting gable to the west. In the angle is a doorway with a heavy lintel, and the windows are mixed; some are mullioned, and others are casements and horizontally-sliding sashes. The extension consists of a concave canted wing with glazed screens divided by pilasters, and a mansard roof with dormers. | II |
| Troway Hall; 53.31330°N 1.42114°W | — | Early 17th century | A sandstone house with quoins and a stone slate roof, hipped at the east end, and with coped gables. There are two storeys and attics, three bays and three gables, two full-height, and one lower and projecting. The doorway has a massive lintel and a hood mould. Some windows are mullioned, some have single lights, and others are casements. | II |
| Kent House; 53.33114°N 1.39668°W | — | c. 1630 | The house is in sandstone, with quoins, and a roof of stone slate and tile with coped gables. There are two storeys and attics, and an H-shaped plan, consisting of a hall range and gabled cross-wings. The original doorway has a quoined surround and is blocked, and a window has been converted into a doorway. Most of the windows are mullioned with hood moulds, and some mullions removed and replaced by casement windows. | II |
| Dowland Farmhouse; 53.32561°N 1.40267°W | — | 17th century | A sandstone farmhouse with quoins and a Welsh slate roof. There are two storeys, an L-shaped plan and a front of two bays. The windows on the front are mullioned, and at the rear is a single-light window. | II |
| Green Hall Farmhouse; 53.30809°N 1.36463°W | — | Mid 17th century | The farmhouse, which was altered in the 20th century, is in sandstone with quoins, and a tile roof with pantiles on the extension. There are two storeys and an L-shaped plan, with a front range of two bays. The central doorway has a plain surround and a massive lintel. It is flanked by casement windows, and elsewhere the windows are mullioned. In the southeast gable are bull's-eye windows in square surrounds with crosses in relief. | II |
| Outbuilding south of Hazelbarrow Farmhouse; 53.32811°N 1.44793°W | | Mid 17th century | The outbuilding is in sandstone, with quoins, and a roof of corrugated sheet, hipped to the north. There are two storeys and eight bays. The openings are irregular, and have been altered, and include doorways with quoined surrounds, doorways converted into windows, mullioned windows with hood moulds, and single-light windows. | II |
| Outbuildings southeast of Hazelbarrow Farmhouse; 53.32795°N 1.44825°W | | Mid 17th century | Originally a cowhouse, the outbuilding is in sandstone, and has a roof of corrugated asbestos with coped gables and moulded kneelers. There are two storeys and four bays. It contains a doorway with a quoined surround and a keystone carved into the lintel, an inserted doorway, cross windows, a taking-in doorway, and slit vents. | II |
| Litfield Farmhouse and outbuildings 53.32396°N 1.40470°W | — | 17th century | The farmhouse is in sandstone, with quoins, and a roof of Welsh slate and stone slate with coped gables and moulded kneelers. There are two storeys and an L-shaped plan, consisting of a range of three bays and a gabled cross-wing to the east. The doorways have quoined surrounds and the windows are mullioned with hood moulds. The attached outbuildings form an irregular T-shaped plan. | II |
| Southgate Old House; 53.30790°N 1.35428°W | — | Mid 17th century | The house is in sandstone with quoins and a pantile roof with coped gables and moulded kneelers. There is a single storey and attics, a front of three bays with two gables, and rear extensions. The central doorway has a chamfered quoined surround, and a slightly cambered soffit to the lintel. The windows have single lights or are mullioned, and have hood moulds. Inside the house are two cruck trusses. Adjoining the house to the north is a single-storey two-bay range that also contains two cruck trusses. | II |
| Fold Farm Cottage; 53.31313°N 1.41036°W | — | 1669 | Cottages, later combined into a house in sandstone on a plinth, with quoins, and a tile roof. There are two storeys, and a T-shaped plan, with a front of seven bays, and a gabled rear wing. On the front are two doorways, one with a quoined surround, and both with chamfered dated and initialled lintels. Some of the windows are mullioned, and others have single lights. | II |
| Outbuilding, Carter Hall Farm; 53.33222°N 1.41530°W | — | Late 17th century | The outbuilding is in sandstone, with quoins, and a corrugated sheet roof, with coped gables and moulded kneelers. There are two storeys, and six bays. In the centre is a doorway with a massive quoined surround and lintel, now blocked, there are three inserted doorways, a blocked loading door, and slit vents. | II |
| Troway Hall Farmhouse; 53.31357°N 1.42187°W | — | Late 17th century | A sandstone farmhouse with quoins and a roof of Welsh slate and stone slate. There are two storeys, a double pile plan, and three bays with two gables. The doorway has a quoined surround and a massive carved lintel. The windows are mullioned under continuous hood moulds. | II |
| Marsh Lane Farmhouse; 53.30738°N 1.38531°W | — | 1681 | The farmhouse is in sandstone, partly on a moulded plinth, and it has a tile roof with coped gables and moulded kneelers. There are two storeys and attics, and a cruciform plan. On the front are three bays, the middle bay projecting. The doorway in the north bay has a chamfered quoined surround, a massive lintel, and a hood mould, and the doorway in the south bay has inscribed initials and the date. Most of the windows are mullioned with hood moulds. | II |
| Monument, Eckington Parish Church; 53.31319°N 1.35286°W | — | 1685 | The monument in the churchyard is to the memory of Henry Hazelhurst and his wife. It is a stone chest tomb, and has a cover with a moulded rim. On the cover is a long inscription, and it is decorated with vine motifs and circular patterns. | II |
| Carter Hall Farmhouse; 53.33218°N 1.41617°W | — | 1690s | The farmhouse is in sandstone, with quoins, sill and lintel bands, and a roof of tile and stone slate with coped gables and moulded kneelers. There are two storeys, a front of five bays with a pediment over the middle three bays containing a round window, and a lower two-storey range to the north. In the centre is a gabled porch with decorative bargeboards, and a doorway with an architrave, a frieze, a cornice and a shield of arms. The windows on the front are casements, and at the rear is a mullioned and transomed stair window. | II |
| Malthouse Farmhouse; 53.31177°N 1.35282°W | — | c. 1700 | The farmhouse, which was extended in the 19th century, is in sandstone, with quoins, coved eaves, and a Welsh slate roof with moulded gables and kneelers. There are two storeys and a T-shaped plan, with a main range of five bays and a rear stair tower. The central doorway has a moulded surround and a keystone. There is a mullioned and transomed stair window, but most of the mullioned windows have been replaced by horizontally-sliding sash windows, most with hood moulds. | II |
| Park Farmhouse and farm building 53.30070°N 1.31636°W | | c. 1700 | The buildings are in sandstone, with quoins, coped gables, and moulded kneelers, and two storeys. The house has a roof of Welsh slate and tile, three bays, and a doorway with a massive surround and a lintel with a keystone. The windows in the left bay are sashes, in the other bays they are casements, and at the rear is a two-light mullioned window. The outbuilding has a stone slate roof, five bays, four doorways with massive surrounds, windows, and a taking-in door. | II |
| Gatepiers, Hazelbarrow Farmhouse; 53.32796°N 1.44768°W | — | Early 18th century | The piers flanked the entrance to Hazelbarrow Hall, now demolished. They are square, in stone, each with a banded frieze, a projecting cornice, and a ball finial on a tapered stem. | II |
| Ford Farmhouse; 53.31860°N 1.39999°W | — | c. 1750 | A sandstone farmhouse with quoins, and a Welsh slate roof with coped gables and moulded kneelers. There are three storeys, and a T-shaped plan, with a front range of three bays, and a rear range with two storeys and one bay. The central doorway has a massive quoined surround. In the ground floor are semicircular bay windows, and the other windows are mullioned. | II |
| 68 and 70 Church Street, Eckington; 53.31102°N 1.35517°W | — | Mid 18th century | A house and a shop in sandstone with some brick, and a roof of pantile and stone slate with coped gables and moulded kneelers. There are two storeys and two bays, and a lower extension at each end. Facing the street is a shop front, some windows are mullioned, and others are later casements and single-light windows. | II |
| 131, 133 and 135 High Street, Eckington; 53.30750°N 1.36426°W | | Mid 18th century | Three houses in sandstone with quoins, lintel bands, and a Welsh slate roof with coped gables and moulded kneelers. There are three storeys, and an L-shaped plan, with a front range of three bays, and a rear range. The central doorway has a moulded shallow cornice, and the windows are sashes. | II |
| Camms House; 53.31107°N 1.35497°W | — | Mid 18th century | The house is in sandstone with quoins and a Welsh slate roof. There are three storeys, an L-shaped plan, a front range of three bays, and a brick stair tower at the rear. The central doorway has a rectangular fanlight, the windows on the front are sashes, at the rear is a mullioned window, and the stair tower has a transomed window. | II |
| Farm buildings southeast of Carter Hall Farmhouse; 53.33207°N 1.41543°W | — | Mid 18th century | The buildings are in sandstone with stone slate roofs. They form a splayed L-shaped plan, consisting of a cowhouse with a loft, a taller stable, and a lower bay. There are external stairs, and the openings include doorways, some with quoined surrounds, some with massive lintels, and windows, and there is a louvred ventilator. | II |
| Hazelbarrow Farmhouse and wall 53.32833°N 1.44785°W | | 18th century | The farmhouse and wall incorporate part of the demolished Hazelbarrow Hall. The farmhouse is in sandstone, with quoins, and a roof of Welsh slate and stone slate with coped gables and moulded kneelers. There are two storeys, an L-shaped plan, and a single-storey range in the angle of the two main ranges. On the front are three bays, and a central doorway with a moulded surround and a hood mould, and the windows are sashes. Attached to the north gable is a wall containing mullioned openings, a doorway, an arched opening, and a slit window. At the end of the wall is a tower, adjoining which is a garden wall. | II |
| Fountain southeast of Renishaw Hall; 53.30216°N 1.34412°W | — | 18th century (probable) | The fountain in the garden is in Veronese marble, it is in a circular moulded basin, and has three tiers. The stem has a bell-shaped base and a projecting rim with four mask spouts, and above it is a chalice stem for a mushroom cap. The second tier has four grotesque mask spouts, and surmounting it is a small urn with fruit. | II |
| Fountain southwest of Renishaw Hall; 53.30211°N 1.34493°W | — | 18th century (probable) | The fountain in the garden is in Veronese marble, it is in a circular moulded basin, and has three tiers. The stem has a bell-shaped base and a projecting rim with four mask spouts, and above it is a chalice stem for a mushroom cap. The second tier has four grotesque mask spouts, and surmounting it is a small urn with fruit. | II |
| The Hollies; 53.31100°N 1.35419°W | — | 18th century | Two cottages, later one house, it is in sandstone, with Welsh slate roofs, and two storeys. It is in two parts, the west part is rendered and has stone slate eaves and a coped gable. There are two bays, a central doorway with a massive surround, one sash window, and the other windows are mullioned with two lights. The east part is taller and has three bays, and all the windows are sashes. | II |
| 8 Birley Hey; 53.31904°N 1.40399°W | — | Late 18th century | A sandstone house with quoins and a stone slate roof. There are two storeys and two bays, and an extension to the north. The central doorway has a massive surround and lintel. The windows are 19th-century casements, and at the rear is a two-light mullioned window. | II |
| 125 and 127 High Street, Eckington, and outbuilding 53.30774°N 1.36407°W | — | Late 18th century | The house, later divided, and the outbuilding are in sandstone with quoins, a roof with coped gables and moulded kneelers, and two storeys. The house has three bays, and paired doorways in the centre with massive jambs and lintels, and rectangular fanlights. The outbuilding to the east has four bays, and contains a doorway with a massive surround and slit vents. | II |
| Warehouse north of Birley Hay Farmhouse; 53.31875°N 1.40413°W | — | Late 18th century | The former warehouse is in sandstone with a Welsh slate roof. There are two storeys and three bays. The doorways have massive surrounds and lintels, and most of the windows are mullioned. In the south gable end is a loading door in the upper floor. | II |
| Outbuilding, Commonside Farm; 53.32249°N 1.39883°W | — | Late 18th century | The outbuilding, originally a tool workshop, is in sandstone with quoins and a stone slate roof. There are two storeys and one bay. In the east front is a loading door with a massive surround and double doors, on the south side is an external stairway to an upper floor doorway, and elsewhere are mullioned windows. | II |
| Gate piers and wall, Eckington Rectory; 53.31285°N 1.35256°W | — | Late 18th century | The gate piers at the entrance to the drive are in sandstone, they are square, and each pier has a chamfered plinth, a cornice, a fluted pedestal, and a substantial ball finial. They are flanked by walls with half-round copings, they extend to enclose the garden, they incorporate two quoined doorways, one blocked, and end in a gateway with low piers. | II |
| Outbuildings southeast of Ford Farmhouse; 53.31851°N 1.39961°W | — | Late 18th century | A building in sandstone with quoins and a Welsh slate roof. There are two storeys and three bays. In the ground floor, there are two doorways, external steps lead up to an upper floor doorway, where there is also a window. In the north gable apex is a two-light mullioned window. | II |
| Mill Farmhouse; 53.30381°N 1.33727°W | — | Late 18th century | The farmhouse is in sandstone with quoins and a Welsh slate roof. There are two storeys and a symmetrical front of two bays. The central doorway has a semicircular fanlight, and the windows are mullioned and have three lights with Gothic-arched heads. | II |
| Rectory Cottage; 53.31279°N 1.35222°W | — | Late 18th century | The house is in sandstone, partly rebuilt in brick, with quoins, and a Welsh slate roof with coped gables and moulded kneelers. There are two storeys and an L-shaped plan, with an offshut in the angle of the two ranges. The windows are sashes, those in the upper floor with semicircular heads, imposts and keystones. At the rear is a Diocletian window. | II |
| Gardener's House, Renishaw Hall; 53.30276°N 1.34787°W | — | Late 18th century | A farmhouse in sandstone with quoins, and a hipped tile roof with oversailing eaves. There are two storeys, and a symmetrical north front of five bays. In the centre is a doorway with a quoined surround, and the windows are mullioned with two lights, the heads linked by a band course. | II |
| Ridgeway House, wall and gate piers 53.32921°N 1.39729°W | — | Late 18th century | A sandstone house with quoins, a coved eaves cornice, and a roof of Welsh slate and stone slate with coped gables and moulded kneelers. There are three storeys, three bays, and a single-storey rear extension. The central doorway has a moulded surround, a pulvinated frieze, and an open porch with an entablature and a cornice on tapering octagonal columns, and the windows are sashes. The boundary wall has moulded coping, and cast iron railings, it incorporates a side doorway, and octagonal gate piers with depressed pyramidal caps. | II |
| The Green; 53.30615°N 1.35320°W | | Late 18th century | A farmhouse, later a private house, it was extended in the 19th century, and is in sandstone with quoins, bands, an eaves cornice, and a stone slate roof with coped gables and moulded kneelers. There are two storeys, a front range of five bays, and a long rear range. The doorway has flush jambs and a massive lintel, and the windows are mullioned with two lights and casements. | II |
| The Rectory; 53.31258°N 1.35231°W | — | Late 18th century | The rectory is in sandstone with quoins, and a roof of Welsh slate and stone slate with coped gables and moulded kneelers. There are two storeys, a main range with a symmetrical front of seven bays, the outer bays projecting under pediments, and a three-bay extension to the north with a hipped roof. The central doorway has a moulded surround, a rectangular fanlight, and a bracketed pediment. The windows in the central part have lintels incised to resemble voussoirs. In the outer bays are Venetian windows in the ground floor, and Diocletian windows above. At the rear are two full-height canted tower projections. | II* |
| Stable Court, Renishaw Hall; 53.30277°N 1.34683°W | | 1794 | The stable building was designed by Joseph Badger, and is in sandstone with a moulded eaves cornice, and slate roofs. There is a double courtyard plan, with corner and intermediate pavilions. The entrance in the east range has a central portico with a semicircular arch and a pediment containing a coat of arms. This is flanked by pairs of Tuscan columns, and above it is a domed cupola with coupled Tuscan columns, and a lead roof with an ornamental weathervane. Flanking the entrance are single-storey three-bay ranges with sash windows, and end pavilions with Venetian windows. | II* |
| The Gothick Archway; 53.30214°N 1.33939°W | | 1805 | The archway was designed by Sir Sitwell Sitwell as the eastern entrance to the grounds of Renishaw Hall. It is in sandstone, and consists of a chamfered pointed arch with square angle piers rising to a cornice with finials. Between them is an embattled parapet with moulded merlons containing an achievement of the Sitwell family. Flanking the archway are single-storey pavilions with two-light windows, the lights with four-centred arched heads and hood moulds. At the corners are panelled piers with pinnacles, a cornice and an embattled parapet. The gates are in cast iron. | II |
| Dairy Cottage, Renishaw Hall; 53.30236°N 1.34713°W | — | c. 1806 | The house is in sandstone with a Welsh slate roof. There is a single storey, an octagonal plan, and a single bay with a hipped roof. The roof is carried outwards on columns, forming a verandah. The windows are casements, and there is a gabled attic dormer. There are two doorways with Gothic arches, one converted into a window. | II |
| Ridgeway Methodist Chapel; 53.32484°N 1.39834°W | | 1806 | The chapel is in sandstone and has a Welsh slate roof with coped gables and crocketed finials. The front is gabled, with a dated plaque in the apex of the gable. In the centre is a gabled porch, and a central semicircular-arched doorway with a keystone and a fanlight with Y-tracery. Flanking the porch are semicircular-arched windows with keystones and Y-tracery. | II |
| Former Methodist Sunday School; 53.32721°N 1.39775°W | | 1823 | The Sunday school, later converted for residential use, is in sandstone with a hipped Welsh slate roof. There is a single storey and five bays. The windows are sashes, with four-centred arched heads and Gothic glazing. There are two doorways, the left one with a plain surround, and the right one with a four-centred arched head, above which is an inscribed tablet. | II |
| 74 Church Street, Eckington; 53.31112°N 1.35542°W | — | Early 19th century | A sandstone house with a Welsh slate roof, two storeys, a double-pile plan, and two bays. The central doorway has a massive surround, and the windows are sashes with channelled wedge lintels. | II |
| 13–19 Market Street, Eckington; 53.31031°N 1.35539°W | — | Early 19th century | A terrace of four houses in sandstone, with a moulded bracketed cornice, and a Welsh slate roof with coped gables and moulded kneelers. There are three storeys and four bays. The doorways have massive surrounds and rectangular fanlights, and the windows are sashes or replacement pivot windows. | II |
| 1, 3 and 11 Station Road, Renishaw; 53.30331°N 1.33756°W | — | Early 19th century | A terrace of six, later three, cottages in sandstone with quoins and a roof of Welsh slate at the front and corrugated sheeting at the rear. There are two storeys and eight bays. The doorways have massive quoined surrounds and lintels, three of which have been converted into windows, The windows are casements with segmental-arched lights. | II |
| 31 Station Road, Renishaw; 53.30001°N 1.33692°W | | Early 19th century | A toll house, later a private house, in sandstone on a massive plinth, with oversailing eaves, and a shallow pyramidal Welsh slate roof. There is a single storey and three bays. On the front is a doorway with a plain surround, a cross window, and a blocked window. | II |
| Coldwell Cottage; 53.30573°N 1.35281°W | | Early 19th century | The house was later extended, with the early part in sandstone, and the extension in red brick, and a hipped thatched roof. There are two storeys, three bays, and a two-storey porch on rustic timber pillars. The doorway has a plain surround and a fanlight with Gothic glazing. The windows in the ground floor are sashes with pointed lights, and in the upper floor are casements; all the windows have hood moulds. | II |
| Outbuilding east of Home Farmhouse, Renishaw Hall; 53.30283°N 1.34751°W | — | Early 19th century | The outbuilding is in sandstone with quoins and a hipped slate roof. There are five bays, and five semicircular arches on square piers. | II |
| Oak House; 53.32123°N 1.39882°W | — | Early 19th century | A sandstone house with quoins, and a Welsh slate roof with coped gables and moulded kneelers. There are two storeys, three bays, and a recessed bay to the west. The central doorway has a moulded architrave, a radial fanlight, and an open pediment, and the windows are sashes. At the rear is a doorway with massive surround and lintel. | II |
| The Angel Hotel; 53.31054°N 1.35578°W | | Early 19th century | The public house is in sandstone with quoins, and a Welsh slate roof with moulded gables and kneelers. There are two storeys and an attic, and a front of three bays, the left bay gabled, and a lower double-pile two-storey range to the northeast. The central doorway has an elliptical head and a fanlight, and the windows are sashes with moulded surrounds and bracketed sills. The window in the attic has a round-arched head and a keystone. | II |
| The Gothick Temple; 53.30194°N 1.34578°W | | Early 19th century | Originally an aviary in the grounds of Renishaw Hall designed by Joseph Badger, it is now a ruin. The building is in sandstone with an octagonal plan, consisting of eight Gothic arches with an embattled parapet, and it is without a roof. Inside, a Venetian well head has been installed by Sir George Sitwell, together with memorials to family dogs. | II |
| The Lawns; 53.32771°N 1.39879°W | — | Early 19th century | A sandstone house with quoins, and a Welsh slate roof with coped gables and moulded kneelers. There are two storeys, three bays, and a two-bay rear range. The central doorway has pilasters, a rectangular fanlight, and a bracketed hood, and the windows are sashes. | II |
| Thornhill and wall 53.32938°N 1.39717°W | — | Early 19th century | The house is in sandstone with quoins, and a Welsh slate roof with coped gables and moulded kneelers. There are two storeys, and three bays. The central doorway has a moulded surround, an oval fanlight and an open pediment, and the windows are sashes. In front of the house is a boundary wall with plain coping, and curving round to the road is a low wall with moulded coping and spear-headed cast iron railings. | II |
| St John's Church, Ridgeway; 53.32626°N 1.39871°W | | 1838–40 | The tower was added to the church in 1883–84. The church is built in sandstone with a Welsh slate roof, and consists of a nave with a clerestory, north and south aisles, a chancel with a north vestry, and a southwest tower incorporating a gabled porch. The tower has three stages, angle buttresses, triple lancet windows with a hood mould above the porch, and string courses. In the top stage are octagonal corner columns, on which are octagonal pinnacles with moulded caps. At the top is a shallow parapet on a corbel table, and a pyramidal roof. | II |
| Railway bridge 53.30575°N 1.33875°W | — | c. 1840 | The bridge was built by the North Midland Railway to carry its line over the River Rother. It is in sandstone with brick linings to the arches. The bridge consists of two segmental arches with a moulded surround, a central pier with a pointed and domed cutwater, voussoirs, a keystone, and the remains of a parapet. | II |
| Road bridge 53.30179°N 1.33776°W | — | c. 1840 | The bridge carries Station Road (A6135 road) over the River Rother, and was built by the North Midland Railway. It is in sandstone with brick linings to the arches. The bridge consists of two segmental arches with a moulded surround, a central pier with a pointed and domed cutwater, voussoirs, a keystone, and a shallow parapet. The abutments are stepped and slightly splayed. | II |
| Church of the Immaculate Conception, Spinkhill; 53.30250°N 1.31981°W | | 1844–46 | The church, extended in 1864 and 1966, was designed by Joseph Hansom, and is in sandstone with gritstone dressings and Welsh slate roofs. It consists of a nave, a south porch, a chancel with north and south chapels, an extension to the north chapel, and a west steeple. The steeple has a tower with three stages, clasping buttresses, moulded string courses, a single-storey stair tower, a niche containing a statue on the south side, paired bell openings with pointed arches, a moulded cornice and a broach spire. On the spire are lucarnes incorporating clock faces, decorative bands, and a cross finial. The porch is gabled, and has a tripartite niche containing statues. | II |
| 86 Main Road, Ridgeway and wall 53.32938°N 1.39726°W | — | Mid 19th century | The house is in sandstone, and has a Welsh slate roof with coped gables and moulded kneelers. There are two storeys and three bays. The central doorway has a massive surround and lintel, and the windows are casements. Attached is a boundary wall with flat coping. | II |
| Gateway, railings and wall, Renishaw Hall; 53.30693°N 1.35098°W | | Mid 19th century | Flanking the entrance to the drive are square rusticated stone gate piers, each on a plinth, with a moulded cornice, and a pyramidal cap on a square base. Within these, are two pairs of openwork piers in wrought and cast iron flanking the pedestrian and carriage entrances. Over the pedestrian gates are overthrows, and the gates have Gothic pointed arches to decorative arcading. Flanking these are serpentine walls, with saddleback coping, and railings, ending in stone piers. | II |
| Methodist Chapel; 53.30809°N 1.36399°W | | 1875 | The chapel is in sandstone, and has a Welsh slate roof with coped gables. There are two storeys and a basement, and a front of five bays divided by giant pilasters. In the centre, steps with railings lead up to a doorway with pilasters, an entablature, and an inscribed frieze. Above the doorway is a triple window with semicircular heads and an impost band, and in the outer bays are windows with basket-arched heads. At the top is a pediment containing a semicircular window. Flanking the steps are gate piers with ogee caps, and low walls with railings. | II |
| Eckington Chapel of Ease, Eckington Cemetery; 53.31663°N 1.35120°W | | 1877–78 | The cemetery chapels were designed by Samuel Rollinson, and are in sandstone with gritstone dressings and a Welsh slate roof with stone slate eaves. It consists of a central archway surmounted by a tower, and flanking chapels. The arch is pointed with a hood mould, and above it the tower has a square base, rising to an octagonal bell stage, and a spire with lucarnes and a finial platform. Between the tower and the chapels are single-storey linking wings. | II |
| Garden walls, piers, statues, and steps, Renishaw Hall; 53.30191°N 1.34438°W | | 1879 | The garden and its features were laid out by Sir George Sitwell. The walls and steps are in sandstone, other than the lowest flight of steps, which are in limestone. The garden has three tiers, and flanking the principal flight of steps, which are semicircular, are piers carrying statues of Neptune and Diana, each with a dog. One of the other flight of steps is flanked by obelisks, and the third by Corinthian capitals. Elsewhere, there is a bust of a male on a tapered pedestal, and a pair of statues known as "the two Giants". | II |
| Walls, pergolas, and gateway, The Green; 53.30644°N 1.35291°W | | 1916 | The landscape garden and water garden were designed by Sir Edwin Lutyens. The features include sandstone walls, gate piers, and timber pergolas. At the northeast end is a wrought iron gate, and piers with moulded bases and caps, flanked by coped walls with balustrades. | II |
| Marsh Lane War Memorial and railings 53.30821°N 1.39167°W | | 1919 | The war memorial stands in an enclosure by a road junction. It is in sandstone and gritstone, and consists of a multi-faceted pillar surmounted by a foliated cross. The upper part is a V-grooved column with a splayed foot surmounted by an octagonal tiered candle snuffer cap, and the lower part is an octagonal pedestal on a double plinth on an octagonal three-stepped base. The names of those lost in the two World Wars are inscribed on the pedestal. The site is enclosed by a low stone wall with decorative iron railings. | II |
| Memorial Chapel, Mount St Mary's College; 53.30431°N 1.31782°W | | 1922–24 | The chapel was designed by Adrian Gilbert Scott, and is built in yellow brick with limestone dressings. The roofs of the dome, the lantern and the stair tower are clad with copper, and the rest of the roof is tiled. The chapel has a cruciform plan, consisting of a nave with a clerestory containing oculi, north and south transepts, a sanctuary with side chapels, and a sacristy canted at the east end. There is an octagonal dome and lantern over the crossing, and an octagonal stair tower by the north transept. | II |
| Statue and fountain, Renishaw Hall; 53.30221°N 1.34396°W | — | Undated | The statue is in white marble, and depicts Neptune in a shell carriage drawn by two seahorses. It stands in an oval bowl of Veronese marble. | II |
