= Eckington Cemetery =

Cemetery in Derbyshire, England

Coordinates: 53.3175°N 1.3517°W

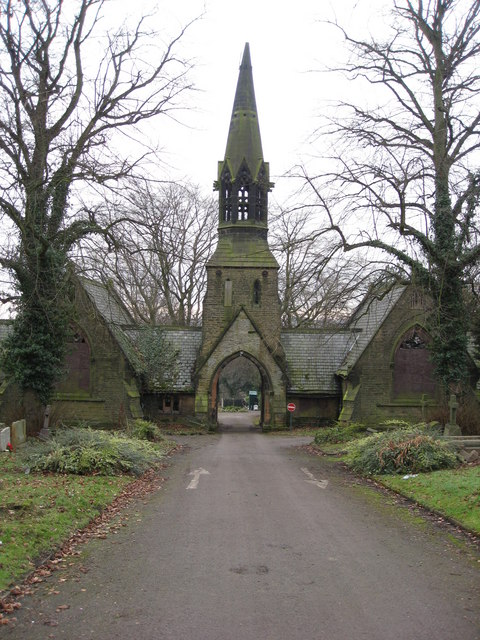
Grade II listed Chapel of Ease

Eckington Cemetery is a cemetery in Eckington, Derbyshire, England. The cemetery serves Eckington itself, as well as nearby villages such as Renishaw, Ridgeway, Spinkhill, Troway and Marsh Lane, Derbyshire. The cemetery features a number of Commonwealth War Graves.

== History ==
The cemetery has been in use since late 1877; prior to this burials took place in the churchyard of St Peter and St Paul's Church. The first interment was for a William Poole, the young son of Charles Poole of Mosborough. The Chapel of Ease located in the cemetery has been Grade II listed since 1989.

The cemetery includes the war graves of 15 confirmed service casualties from both World Wars. More recently, in 1974, was buried Billie Nelson, the professional Grand Prix motorcycling road racer.

In December 2008, ten Roman coins were discovered near the cemetery, presenting evidence of Roman settlement in the area.

== See also ==
- Listed buildings in Eckington, Derbyshire
