= Joseph Tetley (disambiguation) =

Joseph Tetley may refer to:

- Joe Tetley (born 1995), English cricketer
- Joseph Tetley (1825–1878), member of the New Zealand Legislative Council
