= Spinkhill =

Village in Derbyshire, England

Coordinates: 53.3015°N 1.3193°W

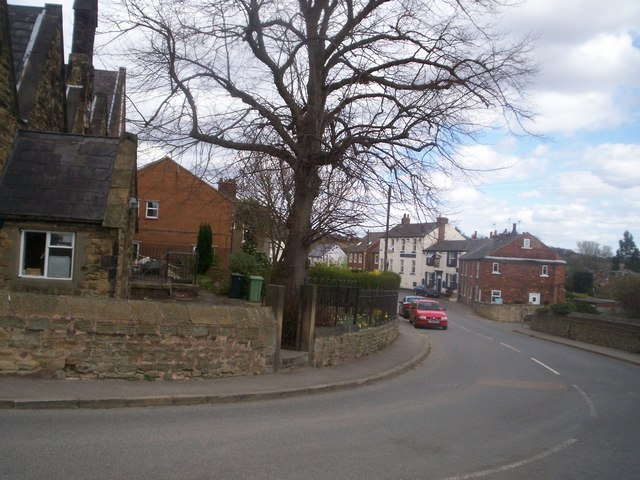
- The pub on the right is the Angel Hotel

- Location within Derbyshire
- OS grid reference: SK458806
- Civil parish: Eckington
- District: North East Derbyshire
- Shire county: Derbyshire
- Region: East Midlands
- Country: England
- Sovereign state: United Kingdom
- Post town: SHEFFIELD
- Postcode district: S21
- Police: Derbyshire
- Fire: Derbyshire
- Ambulance: East Midlands
- UK Parliament: North East Derbyshire

Spinkhill is a small village in North East Derbyshire, England. It is approximately one mile south of the nearest town, Killamarsh, and half a mile north-east of Renishaw.

It is home to the Church of the Immaculate Conception and its associated Catholic Primary School. Spinkhill is also home to Mount St Mary's College, a large private school. The village has historical links to the Roman Catholic Church via the Poles family.

The village has a pub and a café. Other economic activity comes from the several farms situated around the village.

The village has a small bus station and is served by a handful of bus services to Sheffield and Chesterfield via Killamarsh and Renishaw respectively. Spinkhill railway station served the village prior to its permanent closure in 1958.

== See also ==
- Listed buildings in Eckington, Derbyshire
