= St John the Evangelist Church, Ridgeway =

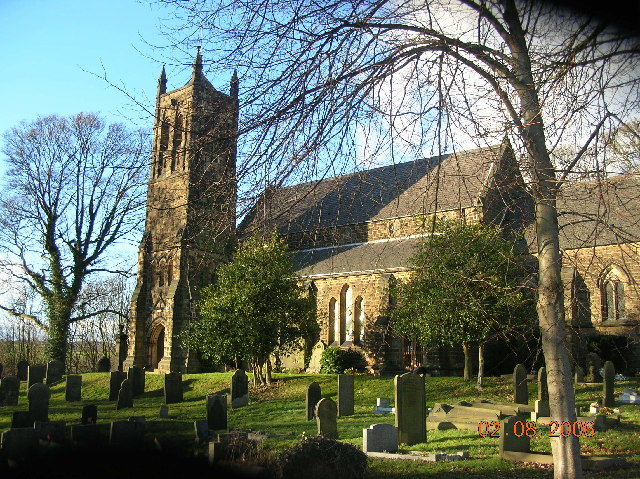
- St John the Evangelist's parish church, Ridgeway
- St John the Evangelist Church, Ridgeway
- 53°18′44.94″N 1°21′11.05″W
- Location: Ridgeway, Derbyshire
- Country: England
- Denomination: Church of England

History
- Dedication: John the Evangelist

Architecture
- Heritage designation: Grade II listed
- Architect(s): Woodhead and Hurst
- Style: Gothic
- Groundbreaking: 1839
- Completed: 1840

Administration
- Province: Province of Canterbury
- Diocese: Diocese of Derby
- Archdeaconry: Chesterfield
- Deanery: Bolsover and Staveley
- Parish: Eckington

St John the Evangelist Church is a grade II listed Church of England church situated at Ridgeway, within the parish of Eckington, Derbyshire, England.

The church opened in 1840, having cost £2,000 to build. The tower was added in 1884. In 1984 changes were made so that the church could be used as a community centre.

== History ==
The Anglican church was built between 1839 and 1840 as a result of the growing population in the village. The dedication service was on 22 September 1840. Prior to the church being built, residents of the hamlet attended the St Peter and St Paul's Church in the nearby village of Eckington. The church was designed in a Gothic style by the architectural firm of Woodhead and Hurst, at a cost of £2,000. The tower and its bell was installed in 1884.

In 1984 alterations were made to enable use as a community centre. One of the stained glass windows is a memorial to Judy Farrer a long serving church warden. The church was designated as a Grade II listed building in 1989.

The parish is within the benefice of Eckington and Ridgeway within the Diocese of Derby.

== Architecture ==
The coal measures sandstone building has ashlar dressings and a Welsh slate roof. It consists of a six-bay nave, two-bay chancel with vestry, north and south aisles and a gabled porch with a three-stage tower to the south west, which is supported buttresses. The upper stage which holds the bell has octagonal corner columns and octagonal pinnacles

== See also ==
- Listed buildings in Eckington, Derbyshire
