= Gerard W. Hughes =

Scottish Jesuit priest and spiritual writer

Gerard "Gerry" William Hughes, S.J. (22 March 1924 – 4 November 2014) was a Scottish Jesuit priest and spiritual writer who served as the Chaplain of University of Glasgow from 1967 to 1975.

== Life ==
Hughes was born on 22 March 1924, in Skelmorlie, North Ayrshire, Scotland, to Margaret (née Barry) and Henry Hughes. Hughes was then educated at Mount St Mary's College in Spinkhill. All four of his grandparents had moved to Scotland from Ireland.

== Career ==
Hughes was known for his 1985 book, God of Surprises, which sold almost 250,000 copies and was eventually translated into almost twenty languages. He also published several other books including his 1997 memoir, God, Where Are You?, as well as God in All Things in 2003 and his last book, Cry of Wonder, released in 2014.

== Death ==
Hughes died on 4 November 2014, at the age of 90, and is buried in the grounds of St Beuno's Jesuit Spirituality Centre, Tremeirchion, Wales.
