= Renishaw, Derbyshire =

Village in Derbyshire, England

Coordinates: 53.3001°N 1.3363°W

Renishaw
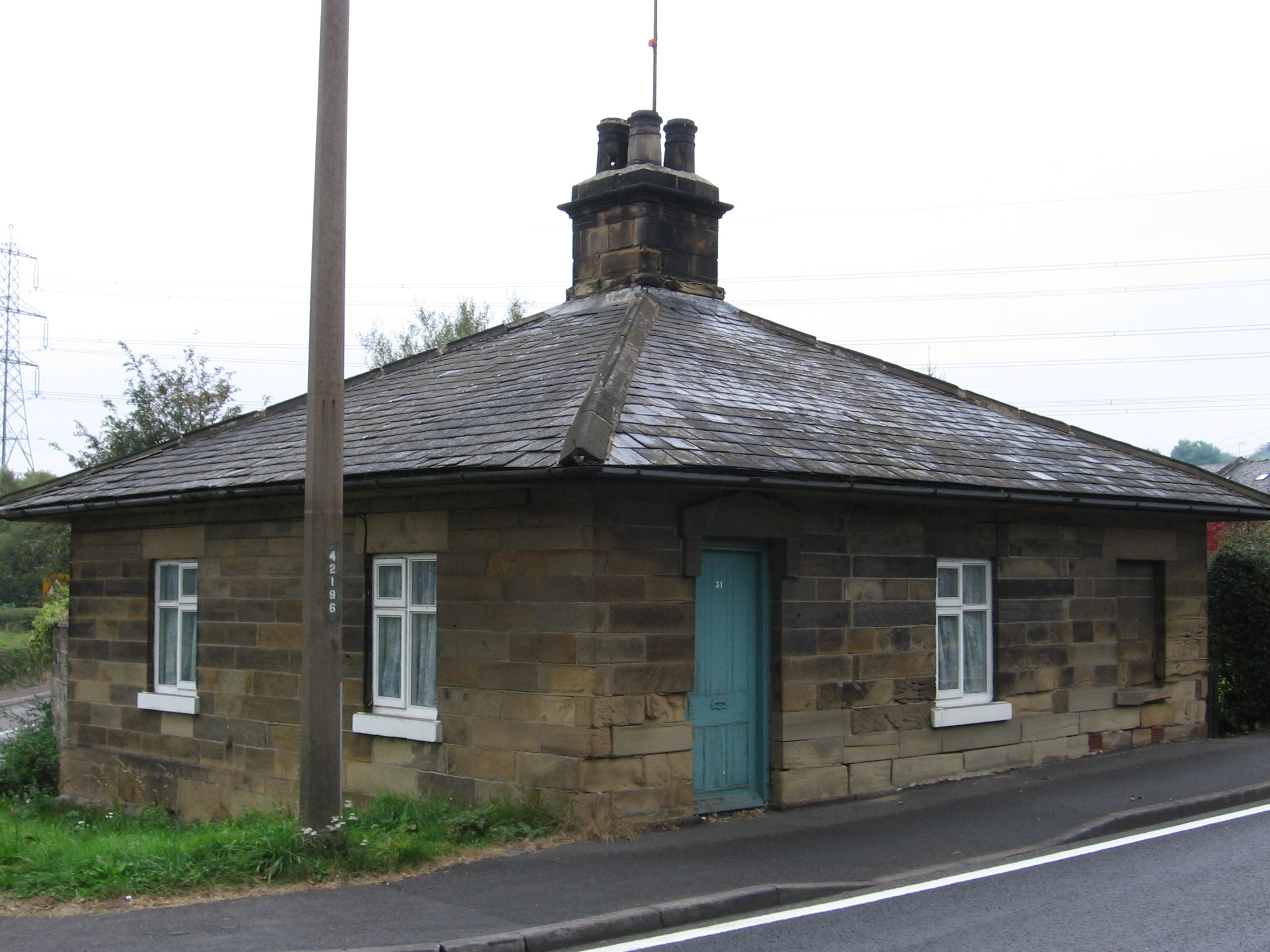
- Renishaw - Toll House on A6135

- Location within Derbyshire
- OS grid reference: SK4478
- Civil parish: Eckington
- District: North East Derbyshire
- Shire county: Derbyshire
- Region: East Midlands
- Country: England
- Sovereign state: United Kingdom
- Post town: SHEFFIELD
- Postcode district: S21
- Dialling code: 01246
- Police: Derbyshire
- Fire: Derbyshire
- Ambulance: East Midlands
- UK Parliament: North East Derbyshire
- Website: http://www.eckington-pc.gov.uk

Renishaw is a village in the district of North East Derbyshire in England. It is in the civil parish of Eckington.

Renishaw lies on the A6135 road between the villages of Eckington and Barlborough. To the west is a section of the Trans Pennine Trail long distance footpath which runs along a former railway line. Adjacent to this is the route of the Chesterfield Canal which passes along the edge of the village. The canal is being restored in stages, with this section having some clearance work done in preparation for the section from Staveley to the south being reinstated. While Renishaw is the name for the village as a whole, in respect of the group of roads that lie south of the A6135, in the section of the highway that is locally named as Main Road (between Hague Lane (B6419) and Emmett Carr Lane), that part is named Emmett Carr.

To the northwest of the village is Renishaw Hall, a country house belonging to the Sitwell family, who were owners of the local iron foundry before it was nationalised. The Sitwell estate was occupied in part by Renishaw Park Golf course which closed in winter 2023 due to financial difficulties. Renishaw Ironworks, founded by the 17th-century ironmaster George Sitwell, was the main employer in the village for many years before its closure in the 1990s, when British Steel plc closed down non-core parts of its business. The site is now part business park and part housing estate. The other main employer in the area was the coalmining industry, as the area had several pits some of which originally supplied the iron works.

The route of the Midland Railway from Chesterfield to Sheffield passed the village in the valley to the west, before the direct route through Dronfield and the Bradway Tunnel to the Sheffield was built. This route was the North Midland Railway from Derby to Leeds.

== See also ==
- Listed buildings in Eckington, Derbyshire
