= Bramley, Derbyshire =

Village in Derbyshire, England

Coordinates: 53.30°N 01.40°W

Bramley
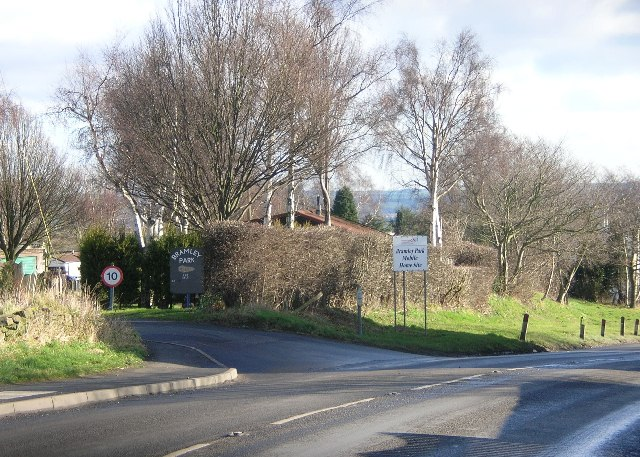
- Bramley Park

- Location within Derbyshire
- OS grid reference: SK4079
- District: East Derbyshire District
- Shire county: Derbyshire
- Region: East Midlands
- Country: England
- Sovereign state: United Kingdom
- Post town: Sheffield
- Postcode district: S21
- Police: Derbyshire
- Fire: Derbyshire
- Ambulance: East Midlands

Bramley is a village in Derbyshire, England. It is in the civil parish of Eckington.
