= Church of the Immaculate Conception, Spinkhill =

Church of the Immaculate Conception
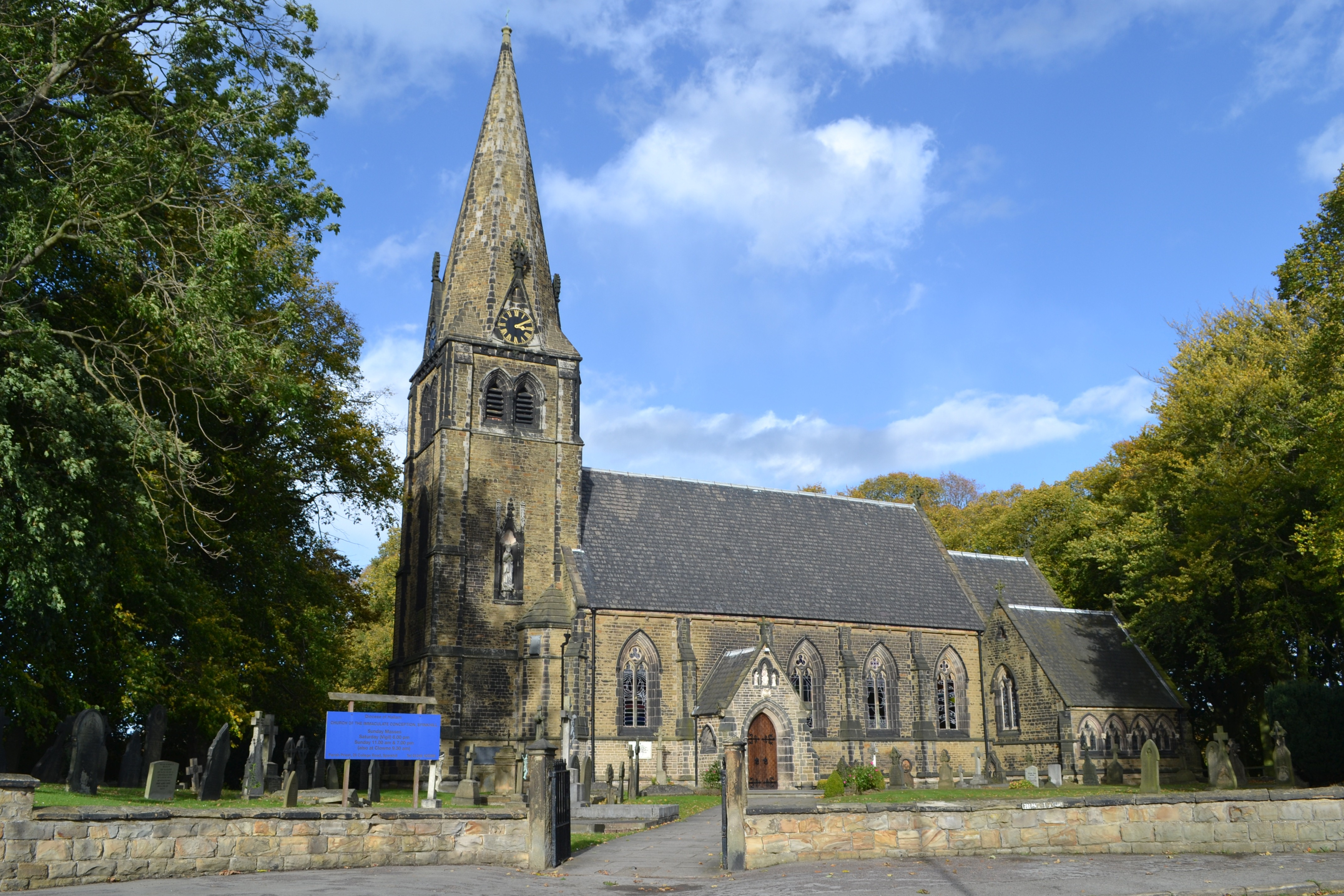
- Church of the Immaculate Conception
- 53.3025°N 1.3197°W
- OS grid reference: SK 45432 78611
- Location: Spinkhill, Derbyshire
- Country: England
- Denomination: Roman Catholic
- Website: Hallam-Diocese.com

History
- Status: Active
- Founder: Society of Jesus
- Dedication: Immaculate Conception
- Consecrated: September 1846

Architecture
- Functional status: Parish church
- Heritage designation: Grade II listed
- Designated: 7 July 1989
- Architect: Joseph Hansom
- Style: Gothic Revival
- Groundbreaking: 1844
- Completed: 1846

Administration
- Province: Liverpool
- Diocese: Hallam
- Deanery: Chesterfield

Immaculate Conception Church is a Roman Catholic Parish church in Spinkhill, Derbyshire, England. It was built in 1846 and designed by Joseph Hansom. It is situated on Spinkhill Lane opposite Immaculate Conception Catholic Primary School south of Mount St Mary's College in the village. It was founded by the Jesuits and is a Grade II listed building.

== History ==
=== Foundation ===
In the 1600s and 1700s, in Reformation England, the Society of Jesus attempted to found Catholic colleges and missions in and around Spinkhill. In 1633, a college and mission were founded in Spinkhill. In 1635, a school in Stanley, Derbyshire, was disbanded. In 1711, there was a recorded instance of a chapel and priest house being located in Spinkhill Hall. In 1791 and the 1830s, the chapel was rebuilt. From 1841 to 1842, Mount St Mary's College was built and the college's sodality chapel incorporated some of the fabric and material of the old chapel.

=== Construction ===
In 1844, construction work began on the church. It was designed by Joseph Hansom and cost £6,000. In 1846, it was finished. In September 1846, the church was consecrated. In 1864, the church was extended, this was also carried out by Hansom. A larger sacristy was built behind the north chapel. The old sacristy was replaced by the Middleton Chapel and which later became the Lady Chapel.

=== Alterations and reordering ===
In 1904, numerous changes were made to the church. The rood screen was moved and replaced by altar rails made of alabaster. A new reredos was installed and the clock in the tower was replaced.

In 1947, a stained glass window, made by Hardman & Co. was installed in the south-east chapel. Between 1960 and 1966, the floor was replaced, the stained glass around the nave was removed and a meeting room was built on the north side of the church, and designed by the architectural firm, Reynolds & Scott.

In 1989, further reordering was carried out. The high altar and reredos were moved to the north chapel. The north chapel then was renamed the Blessed Sacrament Chapel. Stained glass was taken from it and moved to the south chapel. The baptismal font, was moved to the rear of the nave. The altar was replaced by a new stone one. The altar and new ambo were designed by the architectural firm John Rochford & Partners who oversaw the reordering.

== Parish ==
The church has two Sunday Masses, they are at 6:30pm on Saturday evening and at 10:00am on Sunday.

== Exterior ==
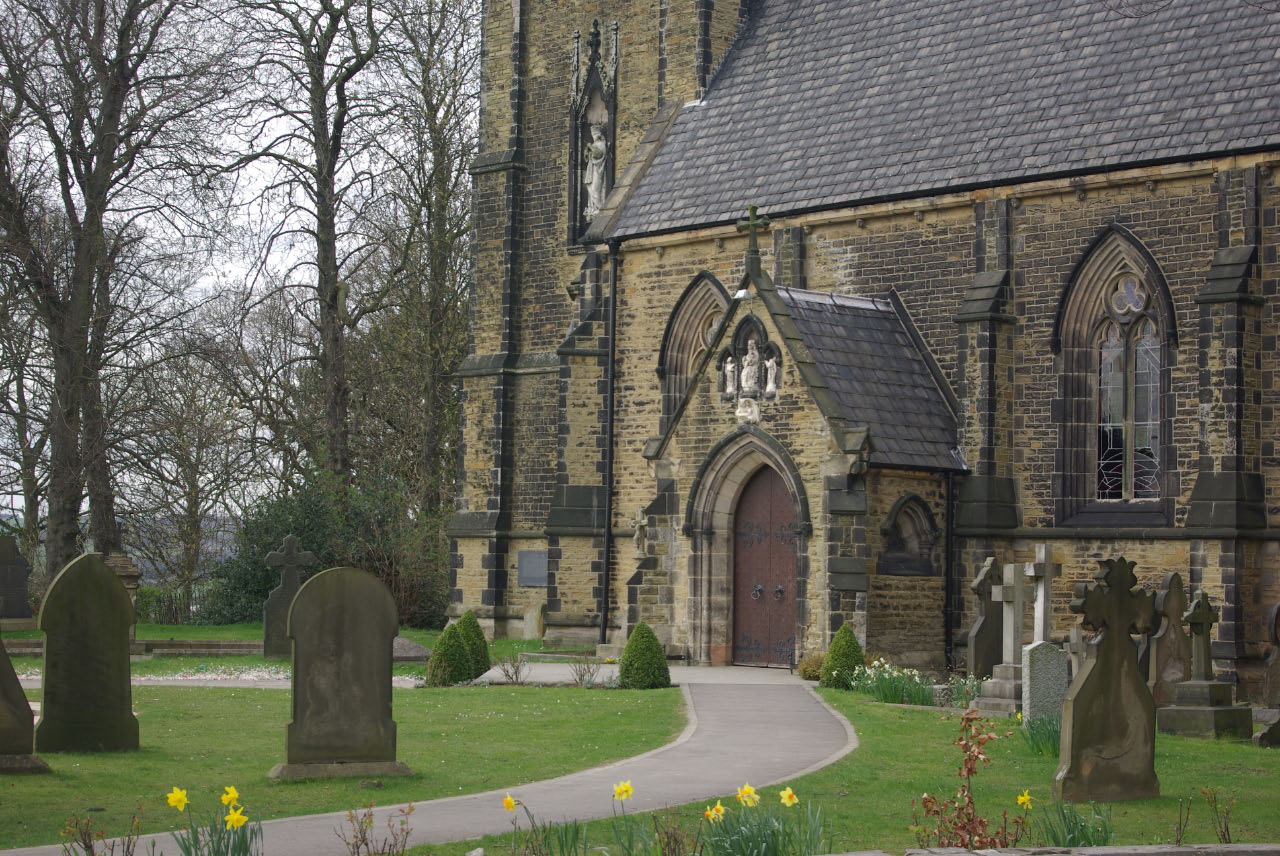
Entrance

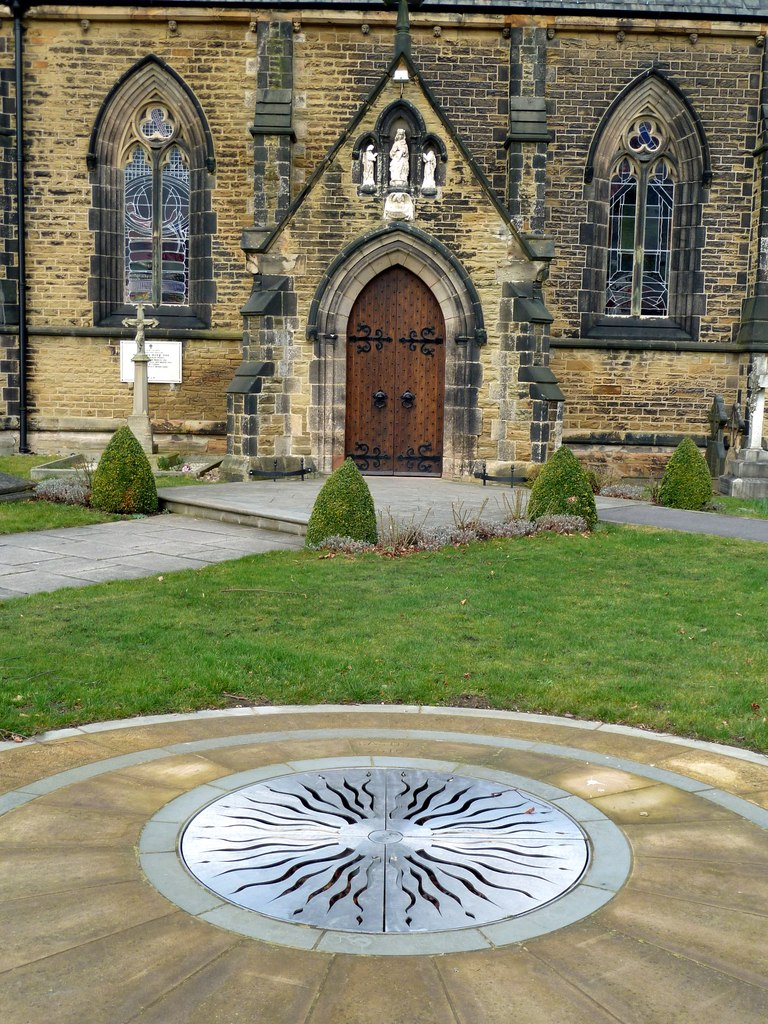
Compass sculpture

== See also ==
- Roman Catholic Diocese of Hallam
- Listed buildings in Eckington, Derbyshire
