= Litfield Farm =

Farm in Eckington, Derbyshire, England

Coordinates: 53.32366°N 1.40500°W

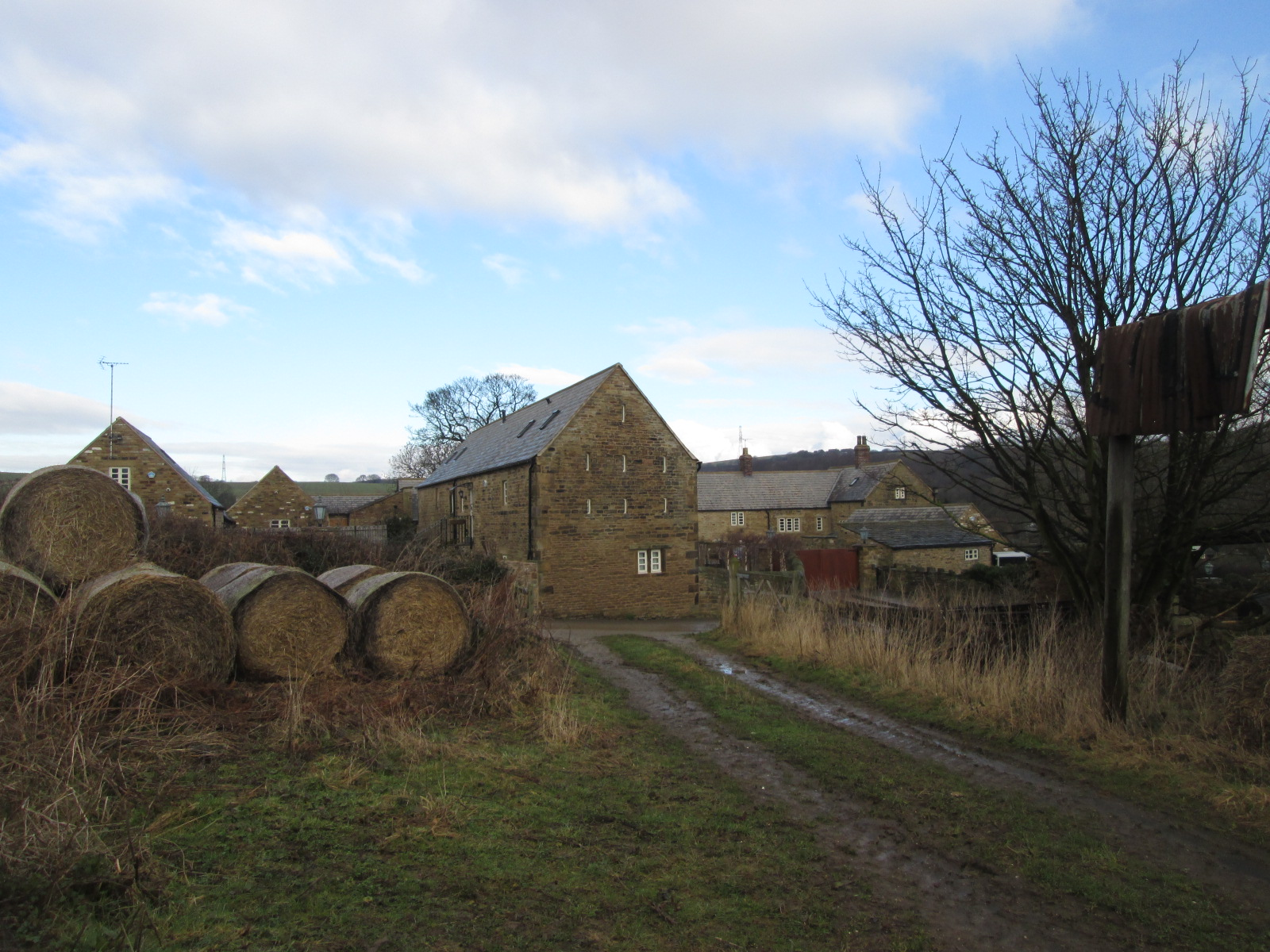
Litfield Farm in February 2014

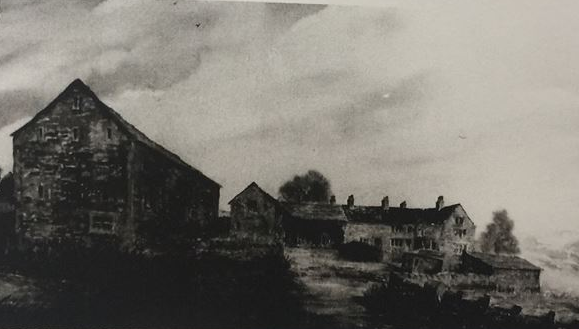
Litfield Farmhouse before renovations in 2006

Litfield Farm is a farm in Ridgeway, Derbyshire. The farm was once regarded as being located in a hamlet east of Ridgeway known as Litfield, but is now part of the larger settlement. The farmhouse is a 17th-century Grade II listed building.

Litfield, or variations of the name, are mentioned as early as the 15th century, when the name appears on the Eckington Manorial Court Rolls. Due to various families, most notable of which was the Staniforth family, being mentioned in relation to the place, it is likely that Litfield was a loose term applied to the area surrounding the farmhouse. The farmhouse appears to have been in the possession of the Staniforth family for centuries. On 24 April 1587, Robert Sitwell transferred the land to Ralph Staniforth. During the 17th century, a William Staniforth was resident at the farmhouse. The farmhouse eventually passed down to George Staniforth of Barlborough. In 1828, the property is divided following the death of George Staniforth and was sold. In 1842 the Parker family was recorded as residing at the property. Upon its proposed sale in 1859, the Litfield freehold estate of 30 acres consisted of the farmhouse and associated buildings, and also five cottages.

Although the house retains most of its original features, it was renovated in 2006.

== See also ==
- Listed buildings in Eckington, Derbyshire
