= Joan Hinde =

Background information
- Born: 21 October 1933; Eckington, Derbyshire, England
- Died: 22 January 2015 (aged 81); Chichester, West Sussex, England
- Genres: Classical, easy listening, jazz
- Occupation(s): Trumpeter, variety entertainer
- Instrument(s): Trumpet, cornet, posthorn
- Years active: 1940-2012
- Website: www.joanhinde.co.uk

Joan Hinde (21 October 1933 – 22 January 2015) was a British trumpeter and entertainer.

== Life ==
Joan Hinde was born in Eckington, Derbyshire. At the age of six she began receiving cornet lessons from her uncle, who was the conductor of a local brass band. In 1966 she married Kenneth Hopson and in 1967 gave birth to her daughter, Claire. She and her husband resided in Felpham, Bognor Regis, West Sussex. She was perhaps the UK's oldest working female trumpeter, and was proud to have been a lifelong member of the very exclusive Grand Order of Lady Ratlings. She died at a nursing home in Chichester, West Sussex, on 22 January 2015, aged 81.

== Works ==
Hinde's showbusiness career began on the BBC radio programme, Children's Hour when very young in the early 1940s. In her teens she progressed to regular and legendary appearances on BBC Variety Bandbox, holding her own against fellow performers such as Billy Ternent and Eddie Calvert. It was during this period that she was the only female trumpeter in the world to broadcast Haydn's Trumpet Concerto.

At the time when her contemporaries were breaking into the new medium of television, Hinde never did, most likely due to ineffective management. Instead, she forged a reputation on the live variety stage becoming a regular fixture with artistes such as Elsie and Doris Waters, Jimmy James and Co., Gladys Morgan, The Black and White Minstrel Show, Max Bygraves, Harry Secombe and Ken Dodd. It was with Secombe that she travelled to entertain the British armed forces during various conflicts, including the Falklands and Aden.

In 2008, Hinde suffered a slight stroke, which could potentially have meant the end of her trumpet-playing career. However, within eleven days she was onstage at the London Palladium, appearing in the national tribute to Ken Dodd.

For her entire career, Hinde remained a radio, theatre and cabaret artiste, and never broke into the medium of television. In 2002 she made her first television appearance in many years on LWT's Another Audience with Ken Dodd. She appeared as the Lady Mayoress who joined in - apparently uninvited - with Dodd's singing of "The Very Thought of You".

In 2012 it was announced that Hinde would be retiring and making no further stage appearances for reasons of ill health. She died on 22 January 2015.

== Personal life ==
Hinde married Butlins entertainment manager, Ken Hopson in 1966. They had one daughter, Claire, who designed and made a large proportion of the concert-wear worn by Hinde.
