= A6135 road =

A-road in Derbyshire and South Yorkshire, England

Coordinates: 53.3140°N 1.3499°W

A6135

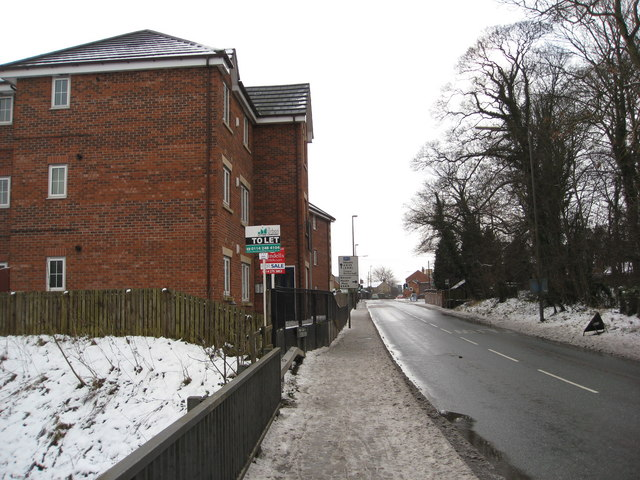
- A6135 passing housing in Renishaw

Major junctions
- South end: Barlborough
- M1 A6102; A61
- North East end: Hoyland

Location
- Country: United Kingdom
- Constituent country: England

Road network
- Roads in the United Kingdom; Motorways; A and B road zones
← A6133	→ A6136

The A6135 is a 4 digit A road in Derbyshire and South Yorkshire, England.

== Route ==
It begins in the town of Barlborough as "Sheffield Road" at the junction with the M1. The road then heads to the north-west, passing through Renishaw where it crosses the River Rother. The road continues north, crossing The Moss at Eckington before continuing north through Mosborough, forming the High Street, and Frecheville where it becomes Birley Moor Road. The road continues onto Intake where it becomes Mansfield Road, continuing north to meet Manor Top at the junction with the A6102 (Prince of Wales Road). The road then continues north-west as City Road, passing the City Road Cemetery and forming Granville Road. It enters the Sheffield City Centre at the junction with the A61. The road multiplexes at this point with the A61 road, before reappearing at Derek Dooley Way at Park Square.

The road then passes under the old Sheffield to Manchester railway line, west of the former Sheffield Victoria Station, crossing the A6109 near Spital Hill before heading to Fir Vale and the Northern General Hospital.

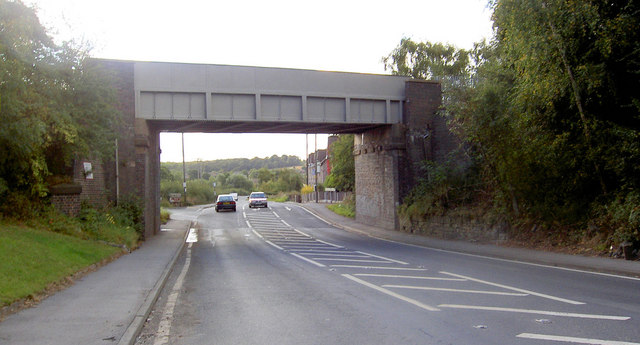
Railway bridge passing the A6135 near Hoyland

The road continues north, becoming rural at Ecclesfield and Chapeltown, where it crosses the Blackburn Brook. The road crosses the M1 again at Hood Hill and Harley before terminating at Hoyland at a junction with the M1 and A61.
