= Blackburn Brook =

Stream in Sheffield, South Yorkshire, England

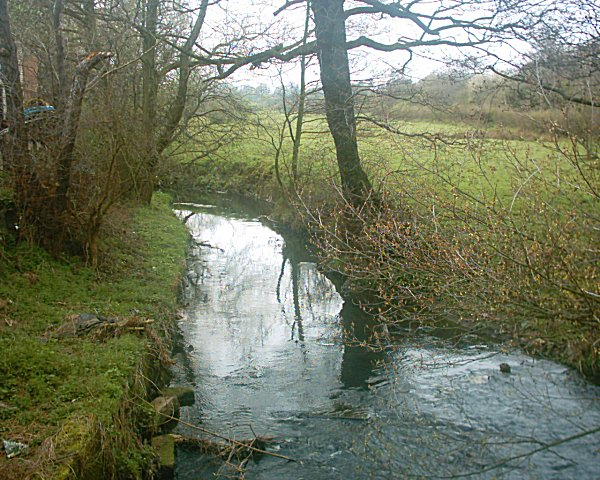
- The Blackburn Brook flows under Grange Lane in Ecclesfield.

Location
- Country: England

Physical characteristics
- Source
  - location: High Green, Sheffield
  - coordinates: 53°28′49″N 1°29′33″W
  - elevation: 390 feet (120 m)
- Mouth
  - location: River Don at Meadowhall
  - coordinates: 53°25′00″N 1°24′31″W

The Blackburn Brook is a stream in Sheffield, South Yorkshire, England which flows through the Blackburn Valley along the M1 and Ecclesfield Road and joins the River Don near the Meadowhall shopping centre. Downstream from the A61 road at Chapeltown the Blackburn Brook is defined as a main river by the Environment Agency, which requires new building development to be at least 26 feet (8 m) from the bank side as a flood defence measure and to allow access to the watercourse for maintenance.

== Course ==
Blackburn Brook begins on the northern edge of High Green, the northernmost suburb of Sheffield, which is some 8 miles (13 km) from the city centre. It is formed from the waters of Storrs Dike, How Brook and Mark Brook, which meet within the boundaries of Westwood Country Park. Storrs Dike rises on the southern edge of Wortley Hall grounds, a grade II listed park and gardens created in the 19th century. It flows to the east and then the south east to the junction. How Brook rises to the west of the junction, and flows through a reservoir and the hamlet of Howbrook. Mark Brook rises to the south-west, and flows to the north east through Howbrook Reservoir to join the other two streams. The combined flow heads, broadly towards the south-east, passing over a weir, under Westwood Bridge, and entering another small reservoir. The outlet passes into a culvert, which carries it under what was a large refuse tip in 1967, and was the northern extremity of Thorncliffe Iron Works in 1905. Thorncliffe Iron Works and the adjacent Thorncliffe Colliery have been replaced with housing, and after a small pond and a short section of stream, the river enters a culvert beneath the housing by Newton Chambers Road, and emerges some considerable distance to the south-east, where it is joined by Charlton Brook, which rises from a series of springs to the west of the suburb of Charltonbrook.

Both channels are crossed by the Penistone Railway line, and after the junction pass through a culvert beneath a warehouse complex, surface briefly, and pass through another culvert beneath houses and the A6135 Station Road. The brook turns to the south, and runs along the eastern edge of the housing at Chapeltown. It is crossed by the A619 Cowley Lane and the railway follows its western bank. After the B6087 Nether Lane bridge, it continues in a course that is further west than it was when the Smithy Wood Colliery was operational. Much of it disappeared under the colliery waste tips, but it has been diverted around the tip, and follows an S-shaped course to regain its original route at the southern end of the site. It then passes through the S35 Industrial Park, under Loicher Bridge, and back under the railway to join up with Whitley Brook, which is also known as Ecclesfield Brook.

Whitley Brook rises as a series of springs to the west of Whitley Hall, an ancient house dating from the 16th, 17th and 18th centuries, with more recent additions. A doorway carries the inscription "William Parker made this worke 1584", and the building, which is now used as a hotel and restaurant, is grade II* listed. A large lake in the grounds was once the mill pond to Whitley Mill. The brook flows east, and then south-east to Ecclesfield, where it is joined by another small stream, rising to the east of Grenoside, which passes through a hamlet called The Wheel, and then fills a large dam. Nearby is Willow Garth moated site and fishpond, which was close to a Benedictine Priory, parts of which remain, although converted into dwellings. The dam supplied water power to Ecclesfield paper mill, sandwiched between the dam and the south bank of Whitley Brook. The brook continues in a south-easterly direction through Ecclesfield, where is powered Ecclesfield corn mill, Norfolk Foundry and Oliver Wheel, before it joined Blackburn Brook.

Immeditately after the junction, Blackburn Brook is culverted under a works and factories, and is joined by Hartley Brook Dike, which is called Tongue Gutter as it rises near Parson Cross, becomes Sheffield Lane Dike as it approaches Shiregreen, and Hartley Brook Dike as it passes along the western and northern edges of Shiregreen. The Trans Pennine Trail long distance pathway follows its course for its entire length. Blackburn Brook continues to the south-east, hemmed in by the Penistone Branch Railway and the former Woodburn Junction and Aldam Junction Railway to the south-west, and by the M1 motorway to the north-east, with the village of Blackburn located on the far side of the motorway. The river once powered Gibraltar Steel Mill, Grange Mill and Blackburn Wheel in this vicinity. There are several culverted sections, as the river weaves its way through an industrial landscape and the sliproads for junction 34 of the M1 motorway. It is crossed by a railway bridge, carrying the Sheffield and Rotherham Railway and the Sheffield Supertram, and finally joins the left bank of the River Don, opposite the Meadowhall Shopping Centre.

== History ==
Between Blackburn village and Grange Lane the brook originally formed the boundary between Sheffield and Rotherham. It is joined by Hartley Brook Dike, near the junction of Ecclesfield Road and Sicey Avenue. With the coming of the South Yorkshire Railway in the 1850s the course of the brook was straightened to run parallel with the trackbed through the valley; however the boundary continued to follow the original course. It runs in a culvert along part of the course by the railway line, which is now closed and forms part of the route of the north–south section of the Trans Pennine Trail alongside the brook.

== Water power ==
The brook provided power for a number of mills along its course, including the New Mill and the Old Mill at Ecclesfield. Joseph Hunter in his book Hallamshire wrote in 1819 that all the nails manufactured in Hallamshire were made in Ecclesfield, and further downstream the river provided power for the manufacture of forks. There were at least four sites on Whitley Brook that used water power, and another four on Blackburn Brook below its junction with Whitley Brook. The furthest upstream was at Whitley Mill, which was in the grounds of Whitley Hall. The mill was mentioned in 1587, when it was part of the estate surrendered to George, Earl of Shrewsbury by its owner William Parker. By 1617, it was back in the hands of the Parker family, for Francis Parker surrendered both the mill and a kiln, used for drying the corn. There are no clear records of the demise of the mill. The use of water for milling was contentious as far back as 1440, when there was a complaint that "the water at Whitleyfeld had been turned back from its right course to the detriment of the Prior of Coventry."

Whitley Brook is joined by another stream, which passes through an area called The Wheel. Clear evidence of a mill dam and the remains of a well-preserved tail race were present in 1949, although no name for the site has been found. Rev J R Eastwood thought it might have been a grinding wheel owned by Alexander Schyrtclyff and mentioned in 1520. Besides being used for grinding forks and cutlery, it may have served another purpose, as there are the remains of a foundry nearby. Ecclesfield Prior was situated just to the south of the junction with Whitley Brook, and the monks had a water mill, mentioned in 1451. It was probably on the site of the large mill pond near the junction, where there was a cotton mill in 1794, run by a Mr Mellor. In 1848 it became a paper mill, after it was taken over by John Gladwin of Damflask. Despite being burnt down at least twice, it was rebuilt and continued to power paper making until about 1901. The dam is now used as a fishing pond by local anglers.

Below the paper mill dam, there were at least three corn mills at various times, but the names kept changing, and identification is difficult. The Upper Corn Mill may have been called Moore Mill from about 1600, but was known as the Upper Corn Mill in 1791. Mr Mellor was the miller in 1794, but by 1817, when Charles Schargill the miller died, it was known as the New Corn Mill, and was labelled as such on the 1855 Ordnance Survey map. The next mill downstream was the Nether Corn Mill, which was known as the Old Corn Mill in 1855, and later as the Oats Mill. It may also have been known as the Carr Mill in 1635. It was the third mill owned by Mr Mellor in 1794. W Green and Company opened an iron foundry around 1845, and used the water wheel to power it. Whitley Brook continued downstream to the Oliver Wheel, which was also known as the Wragg or Ragg Wheel. It may have been the "wheele under Egglesfeld" mentioned in 1552. Rev J R Eastwood recorded that it was a cutler's wheel in 1637, with two troughs. There was a paper mill at this location in 1794, but in 1825 there were eight people at Oliver Wheel whose occupation was fork-maker, and so it may have reverted to a cutler's wheel.

To the east of the confluence of the Hartley Brook Dike the Blackburn Brook was dammed to provide power for Butterthwaite Wheel. There were seven troughs and the site employed eight men when Mr Rawson leased it in 1794. It was taken over by Hallam Brothers in the 1860s, and became a wire mill, making hackle and gill pins for the weaving industry. This continued until about 1890. The site became Gibraltar Steel Works soon afterwards The water wheel was removed, but the buildings and water from the dam were used in the manufacture of paper bags by A J Allen from before 1923 until his death around 1948. To the East of Grange Lane a mill race fed a dam (the local term for a body of water behind a dam wall) at Grange Mill. Rev J R Eastwood was certain that it was the site of a mill built by the monks of Kirkstead in the 12th century, but it is uncertain on what evidence this was based. There were two mills at the site in the late 17th century, while a lease dating from 1723 mentions the two mills with a kiln and coakhouse. Grange Mill was destroyed by a fire in 1904 and not rebuilt, although the remains were incorporated into farm buildings.

At Blackburn village the brook powered the Blackburn Wheel. There was a small community, with cottages for the workers on the nearby hillside. The wheel contained ten troughs in 1794, and there were 15 men working as fork-makers in 1825. This appears to have been its main use until around 1880, after which it was used to produce foundry blacking from charcoal produced in local woodland. It was then also known as Blacking Mill and labelled as a charcoal works on maps, but the business closed around 1909, and all remains were destroyed by the construction of the Electrode Works. Although the wheel has gone, the former course of the river can be seen by the erratic route that the municipal boundary follows through the site, to the north of the present day Royal Oak public house. Blackburn Brook joins the Don at the site of the former Blackburn Forge, where there were one or two dams fed from the brook. The name of the forge master was Mr Artop or Hartop in 1794, and a tilter called Peter Linley owned it in the 1830s, but little else is known, and it had disappeared by 1892.

There was a power station that once stood near the confluence of the Blackburn and the Don called Blackburn Meadows Power Station. The power station was decommissioned in 1980, but both cooling towers could be seen next to the Tinsley Viaduct until 24 August 2008, when they were demolished, scuppering alternative plans to use them as a public art installation.

== Water quality ==
The Environment Agency measure the water quality of the river systems in England. Each is given an overall ecological status, which may be one of five levels: high, good, moderate, poor and bad. There are several components that are used to determine this, including biological status, which looks at the quantity and varieties of invertebrates, angiosperms and fish. Chemical status, which compares the concentrations of various chemicals against known safe concentrations, is rated good or fail.

The water quality of Blackburn Brook, which appears to only cover the stretch from below the junction with Charlton Brook to the River Don, but includes Hartley Brook Dike and Ockley Brook, was as follows in 2019.

| Section | Ecological Status | Chemical Status | Length | Catchment | Channel |
|---|---|---|---|---|---|
| Blackburn Brook from Source to River Don | Moderate | Fail | 8.6 miles (13.8 km) | 16.09 square miles (41.7 km^{2}) | heavily modified |

The river has not been classed as good quality because of physical modification of the channel, which affects invertebrates, and discharge misconnections, where household sewage wastes have been inappropriately connected to the wrong drainage network. Like many rivers in the UK, the chemical status changed from good to fail in 2019, due to the presence of polybrominated diphenyl ethers (PBDE), perfluorooctane sulphonate (PFOS), mercury compounds and other chemicals, none of which had previously been included in the assessment.

== Flooding ==
Water levels are monitored by the Blackburn Brook at Sheffield Wincobank gauging station. The normal range for this location is between −0.02 metres (−0.066 ft) and 0.42 metres (1.38 ft). During the 2007 United Kingdom floods the level recorded by this station was 2.41 metres (7.91 ft). The brook burst its banks at the entrance to Chapeltown Park, and where the stream flows under the A629 Cowley Lane. Many properties on Cowley Lane and Falding Street were flooded and a local schoolboy had to be rescued from fast flowing waters after falling into the stream.

Since the 2007 event, normal river levels at Wincobank have been updated, and are between -0.02 metres and 1.10 metres (3.61 ft). The highest level recorded has also increased, as it reached 2.71 metres (8.89 ft) on 7 November 2019, during the 2019 flooding event. Flood warnings for the Blackburn Brook and Ecclesfield Brook were issued on 7 November 2019, and despite water levels exceeding any previously recorded, flooding was restricted to Mill Road and Whitley Lane in Ecclesfield, caused by blockages in the Whitley Brook culvert, to Butterthwaite Lane and Station Road in Ecclesfield, where the Blackburn Brook could not contain the volume of water, and to Meadowhall Road in Meadowhall, where Blackburn Brook and the Don meet. Contractors removed debris which was partially blocking the entrance to the Whitley Brook culvert on 8 November, enabling the water to flow freely again.

== Flood defence scheme ==
In September 2014 Sheffield City Council announced plans to create a £2 million flood alleviation programme on the upper Blackburn Brook to protect 233 houses. Following further flooding in the region in 2019, the government awarded £80 million for flood relief schemes in South Yorkshire, which included work on Blackburn Brook.

== Bibliography ==
- Miller, W T (November 1949). Allison, Archibald (ed.). The Water-mills of Sheffield (4th ed.). Sheffield Trades Historical Society.
- Sheffield, City Council (9 January 2020). "Investigation of Flooding Event in Sheffield" (PDF). Environment Agency. Archived (PDF) from the original on 16 August 2021.
- Torr, George (26 January 2021). "The 27 areas where £80m flood cash will be spent first in South Yorkshire". Yorkshire Live. Archived from the original on 3 February 2021.
