= Mount St Mary's College, Spinkhill =

Former Jesuit independent school in Spinkhill, Derbyshire

Mount St Mary's College

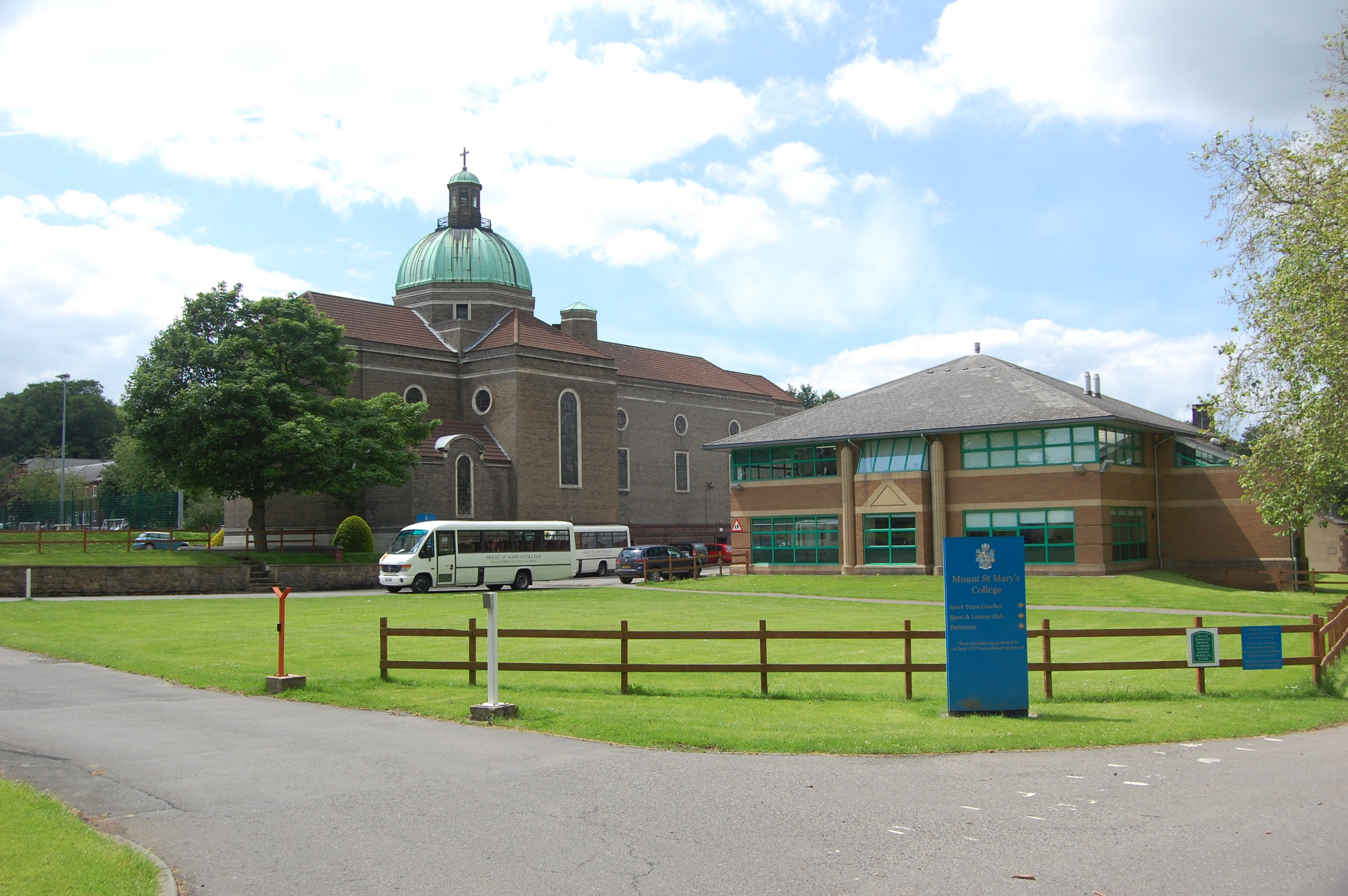

Location
- College Road; Spinkhill, Derbyshire, S21 3YL; England; 53.3043°N 1.3158°W

Information
- Former name: College of the Immaculate Conception
- Type: Private day with boarding Co-educational
- Motto: Sine Macula (Latin); Without sin
- Religious affiliation: Roman Catholic (Jesuit)
- Established: 1842
- Founder: Randal Lythgoe
- Status: Closed
- Closed: 2025
- Department for Education URN: 113010 Tables
- Campus: 70 acres (280,000 m^{2})
- Colour: Red – Yellow – Green
- Preparatory school: Barlborough Hall School
- Former pupils: Old Mountaineers (OMs)

Mount St Mary's College was a private, co-educational, day and boarding school situated at Spinkhill, Derbyshire, England. It was founded in 1842 by the Society of Jesus (better known as the Jesuits), and has buildings designed by notable architects such as Joseph Hansom, Henry Clutter and Adrian Gilbert Scott. The school was a member of the Headmasters' and Headmistresses' Conference and the Catholic Independent Schools Conference.

Its affiliated preparatory school was Barlborough Hall School, which is 2.2 miles away by road. In 2025, both the college and school closed after 183 years.

== History ==
=== Foundation ===
Since 1580, during the English Reformation, there have been Jesuits living and working in Spinkhill, serving the local Catholic population. In 1580, Robert Persons, Edmund Campion, and Ralph Emerson came to England in secret. These first Jesuits were sheltered at Spinkhill Hall, the house that became Mount St Mary's College. In 1620, a clandestine school was founded in Stanley Grange near Derby. When this school was discovered and dispersed by the authorities, it did not cease to exist. It was moved to Spinkhill. The school was in buildings owned by members of the Pole family who were related to those living at nearby Radbourne Hall. During the 1700s, it was recorded that there was a Catholic chapel in Spinkhill, a house for Jesuit priests and that they travelled to serve the Catholics in Holbeck, Nottinghamshire.

=== Construction ===
In 1842, after Catholic emancipation, Mount St Mary's College was founded. It was originally called the College of the Immaculate Conception at Spinkhill and it was founded by Fr Randall Lythgoe, the provincial superior of the Jesuits in Britain at the time. Some of the college buildings date from the 16th and 17th centuries. The oldest part of the college is the Sodality Chapel. After soldiers of Charles II raided a Jesuit college in Holbeck Woodhouse, furnishings from that college were taken to Spinkhill. In 1840, the first buildings built for the college were designed by Joseph Hansom. In 1850, the Hopkins wing (girls) was built. In 1876, construction started on the new college building. It was designed by Henry Clutton. It was completed in 1912. The Memorial Chapel was designed by Adrian Gilbert Scott, and was completed in 1924. It is a memorial to at least 100 former pupils killed in the Second Boer War, World War I, and World War II and it is a Grade II listed building.

=== Developments ===
In 1939, Barlborough Hall, an Elizabethan manor some two miles from Spinkhill, was acquired to serve as a preparatory school to Mount St Mary's College. On 16 July 1939, the then headmaster, Fr Ralph Baines successfully petitioned the College of Arms to give the college its own coat of arms. This was still used by the college up to its closure. During Baines' Headmastership from 1939 to 1945, he was also accepted into the Headmasters' and Headmistresses' Conference, thus establishing the college as a Public School. In 1979, girls were admitted as day students. From 1984, girls began boarding in the school.

In September 2006, Mount St Mary's became its own charitable trust. The Society of Jesus transferred the two schools to the Mount St Mary's Trust. While legally separate from the Jesuits, the college worked with them to maintain the Jesuit mission and identity of the college.

On 30 July 2025, after the end of the school year, it was announced by the board of governors that the college and Barlborough Hall School would immediately close. The board said that the closure came after "increasing financial pressures, in line with the wider challenges affecting the independent education sector in the UK".

=== Coat of arms ===
Coat of arms of Mount St Mary's College, Spinkhill
Notes Granted 23 June 1941. Crest On a wreath Or and Azure, a lily flowered stalked and leaved Proper between two wings displayed Or. Escutcheon Or, a chevron between three crescents Azure; on a canton of the last the Roman letters IHS between in chief a Passion Cross and in base three passion nails pilewise, all of the first. Motto 'Sine Macula'

=== List of Rectors and Headmasters ===
Rector and Headmaster

Fr Bernard Jarret SJ (1842-1843)
Fr John Polding SJ (1843-1844)
Fr William Cobb SJ (1844-1846)
Fr Thomas Seed SJ (1846-1847)
Fr Francis Clough SJ (1847-1848)
Fr John Baron SJ (1848-1854)
Fr Maurice Mann SJ (1854-1859)
Fr George Tickell SJ (1859-1862)
Fr Thomas Williams SJ (1862-1867)
Fr Charles Henry SJ (1867-1868)
Fr Thomas Hill SJ (1868-1873)
Fr Thomas Dykes SJ (1873-1879)
Fr John Clayton SJ (1879-1888)
Fr Henry Parker SJ (1888-1893)
Fr George Huggins SJ (1893-1901)

Fr Francis Payne SJ (1901-1904)
Fr Patrick Wolfe SJ (1904-1912)
Fr Daniel O'Neill SJ (1912-1918)
Fr Arthur Collingwood SJ (1918-1926)
Fr William Hague SJ (1926-1931)
Fr Ignatius Scoles SJ (1931-1936)
Fr Ralph Baines SJ (1936-1942)
Fr John Brady SJ (1942-1948)

Headmasters

Fr James Colliston SJ (1948-1967)
Fr Anthony Nye SJ (1968-1975)
Fr John Gummitt SJ (1976-1990)
Paul Fisher (1991-1998)
Philip MacDonald (1998-2007)
Lawrence McKell (2007-2014)
Nicholas Cuddihy (2014-20)
Dan Wright (2021-2025)

== School years ==
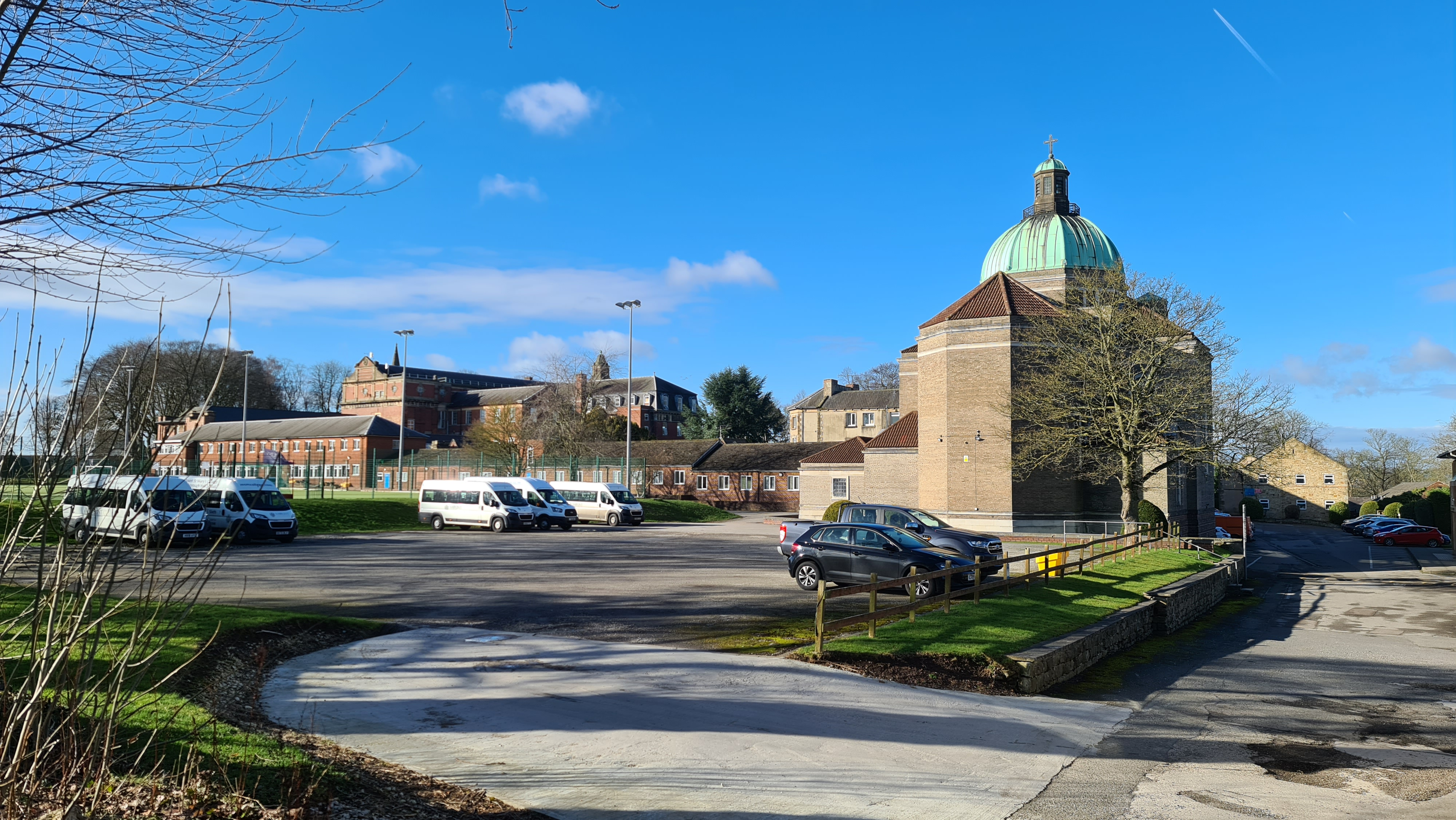
Chapel and buildings

Each of the school years are named after different stages of elementary skills, taken from the Jesuit text, Ratio Studiorum:

- Upper Elements (Year 7)
- Figures (Year 8)
- Rudiments (Year 9)
- Grammar (Year 10)
- Syntax (Year 11)
- Poetry (Lower Sixth—Year 12)
- Rhetoric (Upper Sixth—Year 13)

The school is split into three houses, Loyola named after Ignatius of Loyola, Xavier named after Francis Xavier, and Campion named after Edmund Campion. For each year, there are three forms and each form applies to one of the schools houses.

== Facilities and sport ==
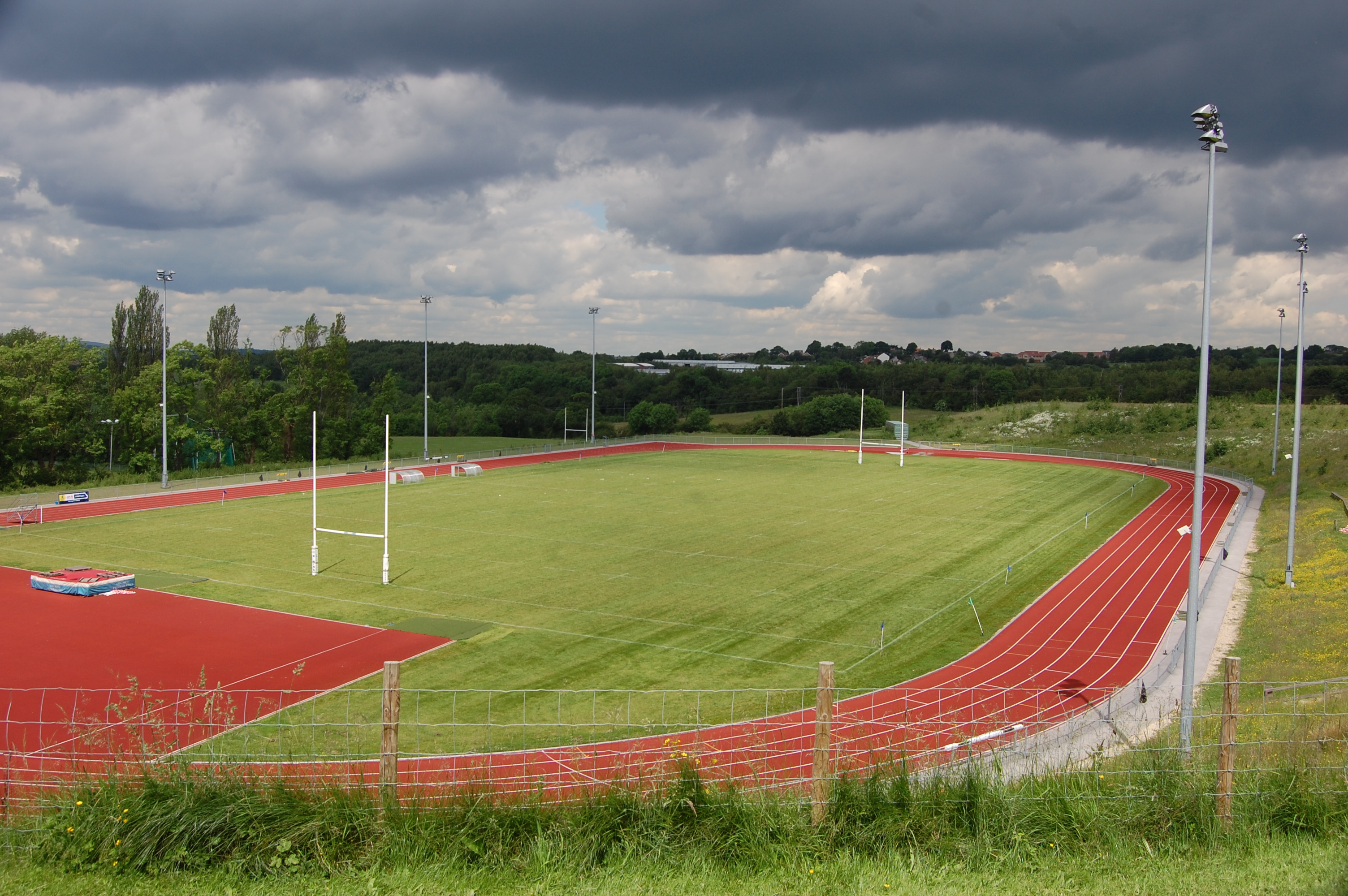
Athletics track and rugby field

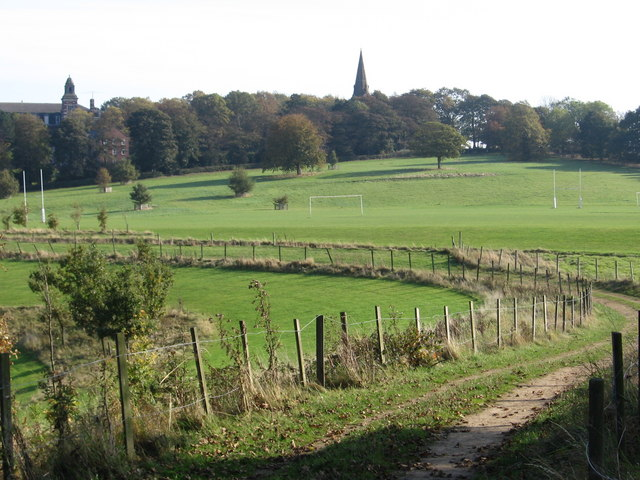
Sports fields and countryside

The college took part in sports, notably rugby, and some of its older students have joined the England Rugby teams along with Scotland, Ireland, Italy, and many other countries. The school also received rugby honours, winning the NatWest Schools Cup in 1994, after being runners up in 1992. The college repeated this honour, winning the U18 National School's Vase in 2022. The college also won the National Schools Sevens four times from 1988 to 1995. There was a sporting rivalry against fellow Catholic Public Schools, Stonyhurst College and Ampleforth College.

Mount St Mary's Combined Cadet Force (CCF) was over 100 years old. According to the Independent Schools Inspectorate, "The school's RAF cadet force became the first nationwide to achieve their 'blue wings' gliding licence," and "pupils achieve high success rates in the Duke of Edinburgh award at all levels." The college had music and drama departments that work together for productions. The college's art department includes design and technology, fashion, fine art, and photography. The college had had exchanges with Notre Dame St Sigisbert in Nancy, France, and with Col·legi Casp and Joan 23 schools in Barcelona. In 2009, the college began an exchange with St. Michel in Saint-Étienne, France and considers Lycée Notre-Dame Saint-Sigisbert a sister school. The college also held fund-raising events for the Chikuni Mission in Zambia.

The college had a Grade 1 Athletics Stadium, which was selected as a Pre-Games Training Camp for the London 2012 Summer Olympics. There were also nine rugby pitches, three cricket squares, an astro-turf, two sports halls, and a leisure centre with indoor swimming pool, cardio room, and two weights rooms. The latter was open to the public for use at specific times and is run by Nuffield Health. There was a Sixth Form Centre, and a programme of speakers coming from outside the college. The boarding community comprised UK and international pupils who chose to board either full-time, on a weekly or flexi basis.

== Notable alumni ==
Old boys (or alumni) are known as "Mountaineers".

- Archie Butterworth, inventor and racing driver
- Tony Brooks, former racing driver, known as the 'racing dentist'
- John Butler-Bowdon, 25th Baron Grey de Ruthyn, British peer
- Sir Paget Bourke, Irish barrister and British colonial judge
- Aston Chichester, first Roman Catholic Archbishop of Salisbury, Zimbabwe
- Fred Dewhurst Preston North End footballer of the 1880s and 1890s
- Emmanuel Berchmans Devlin KC, Canadian lawyer and politician
- Alfred Martin Duggan-Cronin, Irish-born South African photographer
- Vincent Esch, British architect
- Sir Denis Henry, 1st Baronet, Lord Chief Justice of Northern Ireland
- Michael Hills, rugby player
- Gerard W. Hughes, Jesuit priest and writer
- David Jennings, composer
- Paul Lindley, entrepreneur and founder of Ella's Kitchen
- Hugh Lofting, author, creator of Doctor Dolittle (attended the college 1894–1904)
- Brendan McGuinness, British Army officer
- Sir Martin Melvin, 1st Baronet
- Kevin O'Shiel, Irish politician and civil servant
- Steve Perez, entrepreneur and rally driver
- Francis Petre, New Zealand architect
- Henry Petre DSO MC, solicitor and founding member of the Australian Flying Corps
- Carlos Reygadas, film director
- Sir David Rose, former Governor-General of Guyana
- Joe Tetley, cricketer
- John Wheatley, Lord Wheatley

== Notable staff ==
- Sir Norman Adsetts OBE, businessman who sits on the chair of governors
- Harold Cartwright, cricketer who taught cricket and mathematics
- James Cullen, mathematician, taught mathematics at the school
- Paul Fisher, cricketer and classicist who was Headmaster at the school
- Gerard Manley Hopkins, poet, taught at the school from 1877 to 1878.
- Lesroy Weekes, first-class cricketer, current Head of Cricket

== See also ==
- Church of the Immaculate Conception, Spinkhill
- List of Jesuit sites in the United Kingdom
- List of Jesuit schools
