= Joe Tetley =

English cricketer (born 1995)

Personal information
- Full name: Joseph William Tetley
- Born: 14 April 1995 (age 31); Sheffield, England
- Source: Cricinfo, 30 March 2017

Joseph William Tetley (born 14 April 1995) is an English cricketer. He made his first-class debut on 2 April 2015 for Cambridge MCCU against Northamptonshire. He was educated at Mount St Mary's College followed by Anglia Ruskin University.
