= St Peter and St Paul's Church, Eckington =

St Peter and St Paul’s Church, Eckington
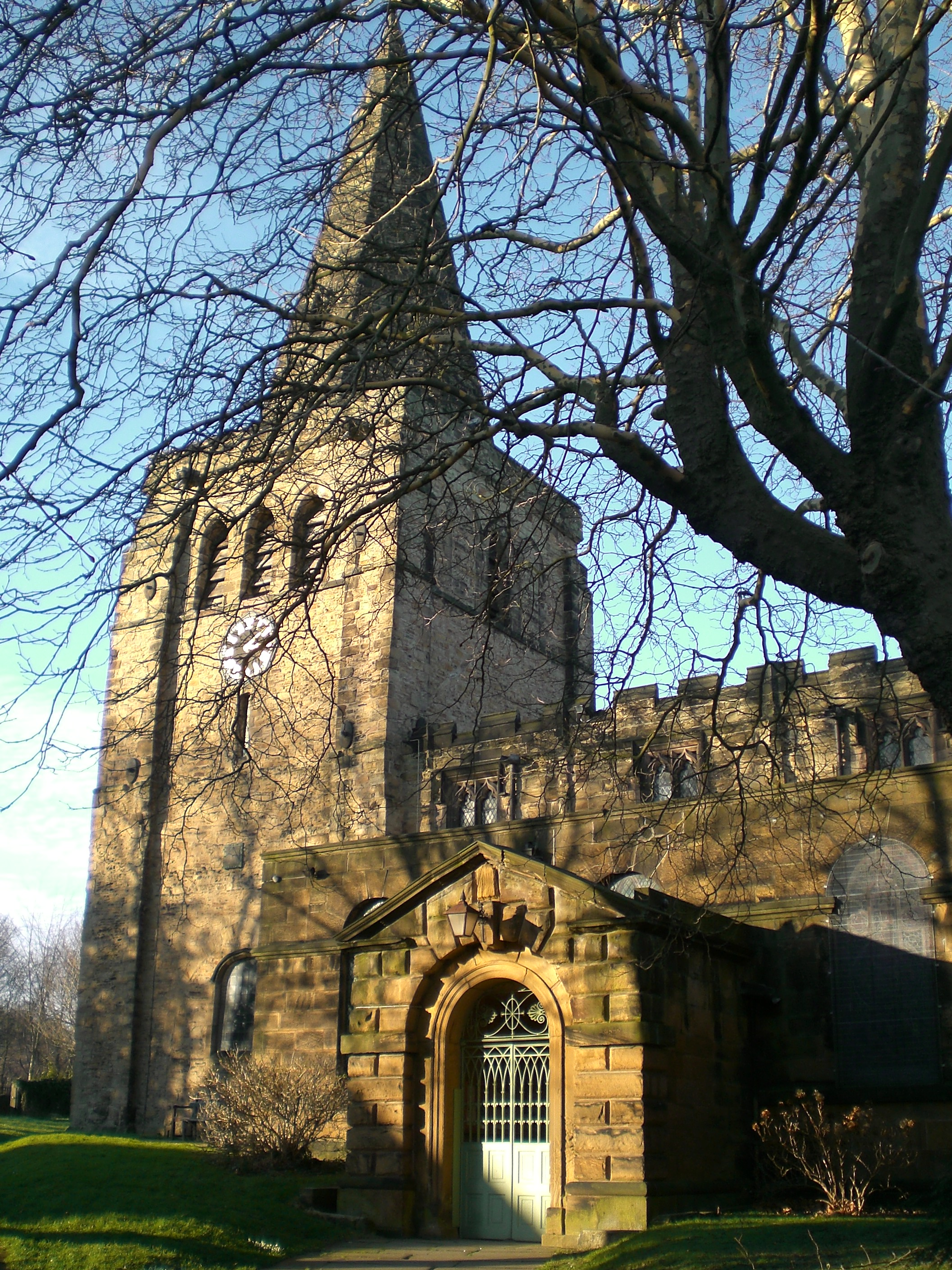
- St Peter and St Paul’s Church, Eckington
- St Peter and St Paul’s Church, Eckington
- 53°18′44.94″N 1°21′11.05″W
- Location: Eckington, Derbyshire
- Country: England
- Denomination: Church of England

History
- Dedication: St Peter and St Paul

Architecture
- Heritage designation: Grade I listed

Administration
- Province: Province of Canterbury
- Diocese: Diocese of Derby
- Archdeaconry: Chesterfield
- Deanery: Bolsover and Staveley
- Parish: Eckington

St Peter and St Paul's Church, Eckington is a Grade I listed parish church in the Church of England in Eckington, Derbyshire.

== History ==
The church dates from the 12th century with elements from the 13th, 14th and 15th centuries. The south aisle porch was added in 1763 by John Platt of Rotherham. Some repair works were undertaken in 1833.

The church was restored between 1877 and 1878 by the architects Flockton of Sheffield. The plaster was removed from the pillars and interior walls. The galleries in the north, west and south were removed. The box pews were replaced with open benches. New stained glass windows were inserted and a new pulpit, reading desk, lectern and communion table were set up. The lectern was manufactured by Jones and Willis. The Dowager Lady Sitwell provided a brass cross for the reredos. The church reopened on 19 June 1878.

The church was remodelled and refurnished by Percy Heylyn Currey in 1907.

== Organ ==
The organ was by Brindley & Foster. Following the restoration of the church in 1878, the organ was enlarged by Brindley & Foster with three new stops and an opening recital was given by Dr Haydn Keeton, organist of Peterborough Cathedral. A specification of the organ can be found on the National Pipe Organ Register.

== Bells ==
The church has eight bells hung for full circle change ringing, and is the location of the Gordon Halls Ringing Centre.

== Memorials ==
The church contains memorials to

- Francis Stringer (d. 1727)
- William Sitwell (d. 1776)
- Mary Sitwell (d. 1792)
- Francis Sitwell (d. 1793)
- Hurt Sitwell (d. 1830)
- Sir Sitwell Sitwell (d. 1811) and Caroline Sitwell (d. 1800) by White Watson
- Alice Sitwell (d. 1797)
- George Sitwell (d. 1667) and his wife Margaret (d. 1658)
- Francis Sitwell (d. 1671)
- Thomas Barlow (d. 1694)
- John Staniforth (Mentioned alongside father William) (d. 1800)

== Parish status ==
The church is in a joint parish with:

- St Luke's Church, Upper Eckington
- St John the Baptist's Church, Handley
- St John The Evangelist Church, Ridgeway

== See also ==
- Grade I listed churches in Derbyshire
- Grade I listed buildings in Derbyshire
- Listed buildings in Eckington, Derbyshire
