= Red Verona marble =

Variety of limestone from Italy

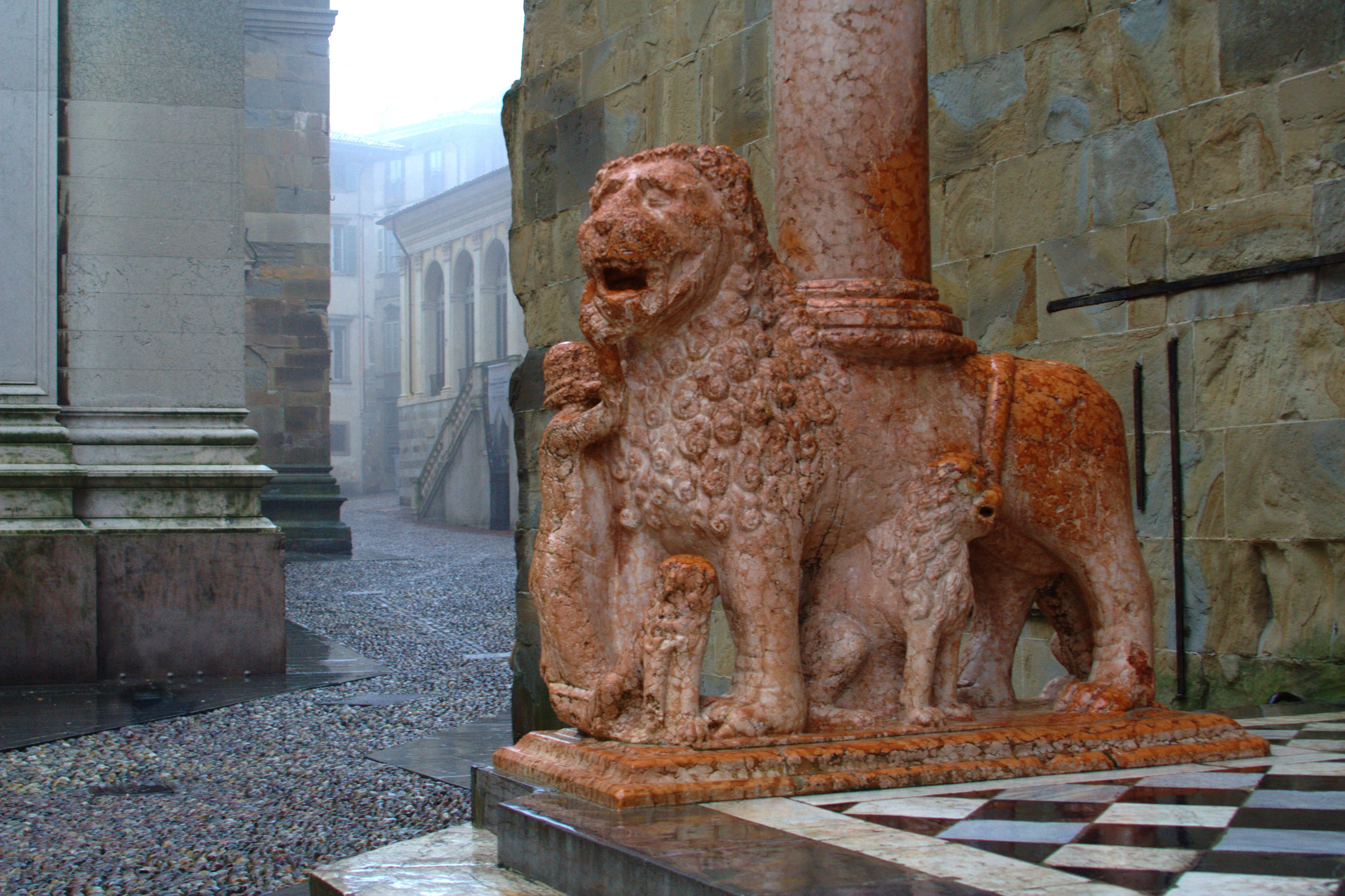
Column-bearing lions in Red Verona marble. Santa Maria Maggiore, Bergamo.

Red Verona marble is a variety of limestone rock which takes its name from Verona in Northern Italy.

It includes internal skeletons of ammonites and belemnoidea rostra in a fecal pellets matrix. It has been quarried from Red Ammonitic facies of Verona or the sedimentary Scaglia Rossa, both in the Lessinia geographical area of the northern Veneto Prealps.
