= Eckington, Derbyshire =

Town in North East Derbyshire, England

Coordinates: 53.308°N 1.3643°W

Eckington
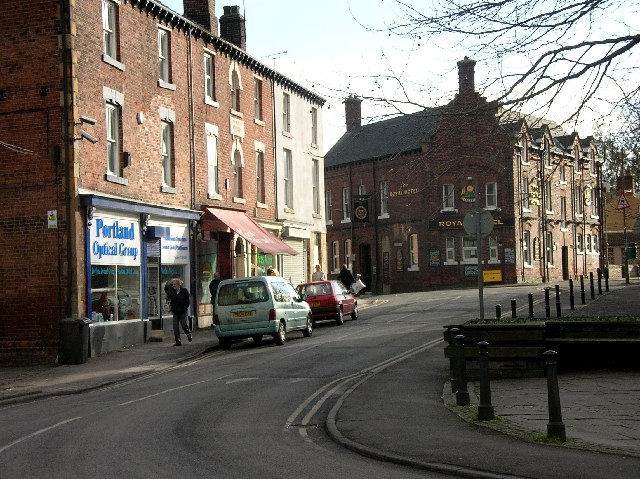
- Eckington village centre (2006)

- Location within Derbyshire
- Area: 17.077 sq mi (44.23 km^{2})
- Population: 11,855 (2011)
  - Density: 694/sq mi (268/km^{2})
- OS grid reference: SK434749
  - London: 135.34 mi (217.81 km)
- Civil parish: Eckington
- District: North East Derbyshire
- Shire county: Derbyshire
- Region: East Midlands
- Country: England
- Sovereign state: United Kingdom
- Post town: SHEFFIELD
- Postcode district: S21
- Dialling code: 01246
- Police: Derbyshire
- Fire: Derbyshire
- Ambulance: East Midlands
- UK Parliament: North East Derbyshire
- Website: Eckington Parish Council

Eckington is a town and civil parish in North East Derbyshire, England. It is 7 miles (11 km) northeast of Chesterfield and 9 miles (14 km) southeast of Sheffield, on the border with South Yorkshire. It lies on the B6052 and B6056 roads close to the A6135 for Sheffield and Junction 30 of the M1. It had a 2001 population of 11,152, increasing to 11,855 (including the parish of Bramley, Renishaw, Marsh Lane and Troway) at the 2011 Census.

== History ==
Ten Roman coins discovered in December 2008, near Eckington Cemetery may be evidence of a Roman settlement or road in the area. The oldest of the silver and copper coins is from the reign of the emperor Domitian (AD 81 to 96) while the others are from the reigns of Trajan (AD 98 to 117) and Hadrian (AD 117 to 138).

Eckington is recorded in the Domesday Book in 1086 as Echintune, a manor given to Ralph Fitzhubert. Some parts of the parish church of St Peter and St Paul date to 1100.

George Sitwell, son of George and Mary was baptised in 1601 in Eckington. George's father died whilst he was a child but as an adult he acquired the freehold of land in Eckington and exploited it by mining iron ore. In 1625, he built Renishaw Hall which is now owned by Sir Reresby Sitwell's daughter, Alexandra and her family.

Sitwell exploited the minerals beneath his estate, chiefly iron and built a blast furnace at Plumbley a mile north west of Eckington in the 1630s with his mother's second husband, Henry Wigfall. In 1652 Sitwell built a furnace at Foxbrooke, close to Renishaw, which became the core of the largest ironworks in Derbyshire. Sitwell made saws at Pleasley and in 1656, installed a rolling and slitting mill at Renishaw to supply the rod iron used by numerous local nailmakers.

During the Industrial Revolution coal and iron ore were mined and local streams, such as the Moss Brook, were harnessed to provide power for factories. The Sitwells built a large foundry and ironworks. Scythes, sickles and nails were made in the town for local use and for export. The Moss Brook was dammed to provide water power at eight sites including Chapel Wheel, Carlton Wheel and Fields Wheel, to grind the blades. The remains of an old forge and drift mines exist in the valley. Eckington had a coal mine in the eastern part of the village, one of the very few in the country which is still operated.

== Governance ==
Eckington falls under the jurisdiction of Derbyshire County Council, North East Derbyshire District Council and Eckington Parish Council.

== Geography ==
Eckington covers an area of 2,089 acres. The geology is the coal measures containing coal and ironstone. The Chesterfield Canal and Midland Railway passed through the parish. The Moss Brook is a tributary of the River Rother.

== Schools ==
The oldest school in Eckington is Camms CE Primary School. In 1702, Thomas Camm endowed a schoolhouse and a schoolmaster to teach 24 poor children in the parish. In 1832, Robert Harrison moved the school to a new building which cost £600, and it was moved again to its current location on Castle Hill in 1975.

Eckington School is a large comprehensive school, attracting pupils from the surrounding areas of Killamarsh, Renishaw, Beighton, Ridgeway and Mosborough. Despite being closer to several Sheffield residential areas the admissions policy favours pupils from Derbyshire feeder schools. Eckington Grammar School in Halfway became Derbyshire's first comprehensive school in 1957, changing its name to the Westfield School, and since 1967 has been controlled by the city of Sheffield. Eckington is also home to Eckington Junior School and Birk Hill Infants.

== Amenities ==
Eckington has a swimming pool near the library, built in the 1970s as part of a town centre improvement. The town has a bus station (halt).

Eckington Woods to the north of the village forms part of the Moss Valley conservation area. They are also known as the Bluebell Wood because of the quantity of bluebells in the springtime.

== Transport ==
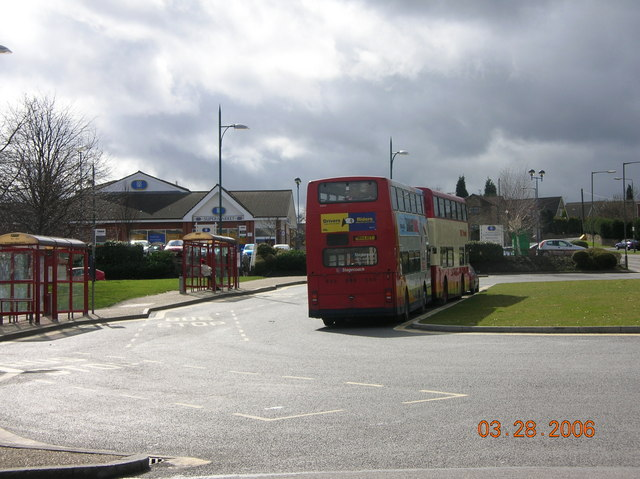
Eckington bus station

Eckington is served by bus services to Sheffield, Chesterfield, Mansfield, Clowne and other surrounding settlements.

== Sport and Leisure ==
=== Cricket ===
Eckington Cricket Club is an English amateur cricket club with a history of cricket in the village dating back to 1885 on paddocks by the Renishaw Hall. The club ground is located on Staveley Lane and they field 3 Senior XI teams in the Derbyshire County Cricket League, two Senior XI teams in the Mansfield & District Cricket League, an indoor Woman's hardball team in the South Yorkshire Women & Girls Cricket League and they run a Junior training section that play competitive cricket in the Ben Jessop Sheffield and District Junior League.

== People ==
Notable people from Eckington include:

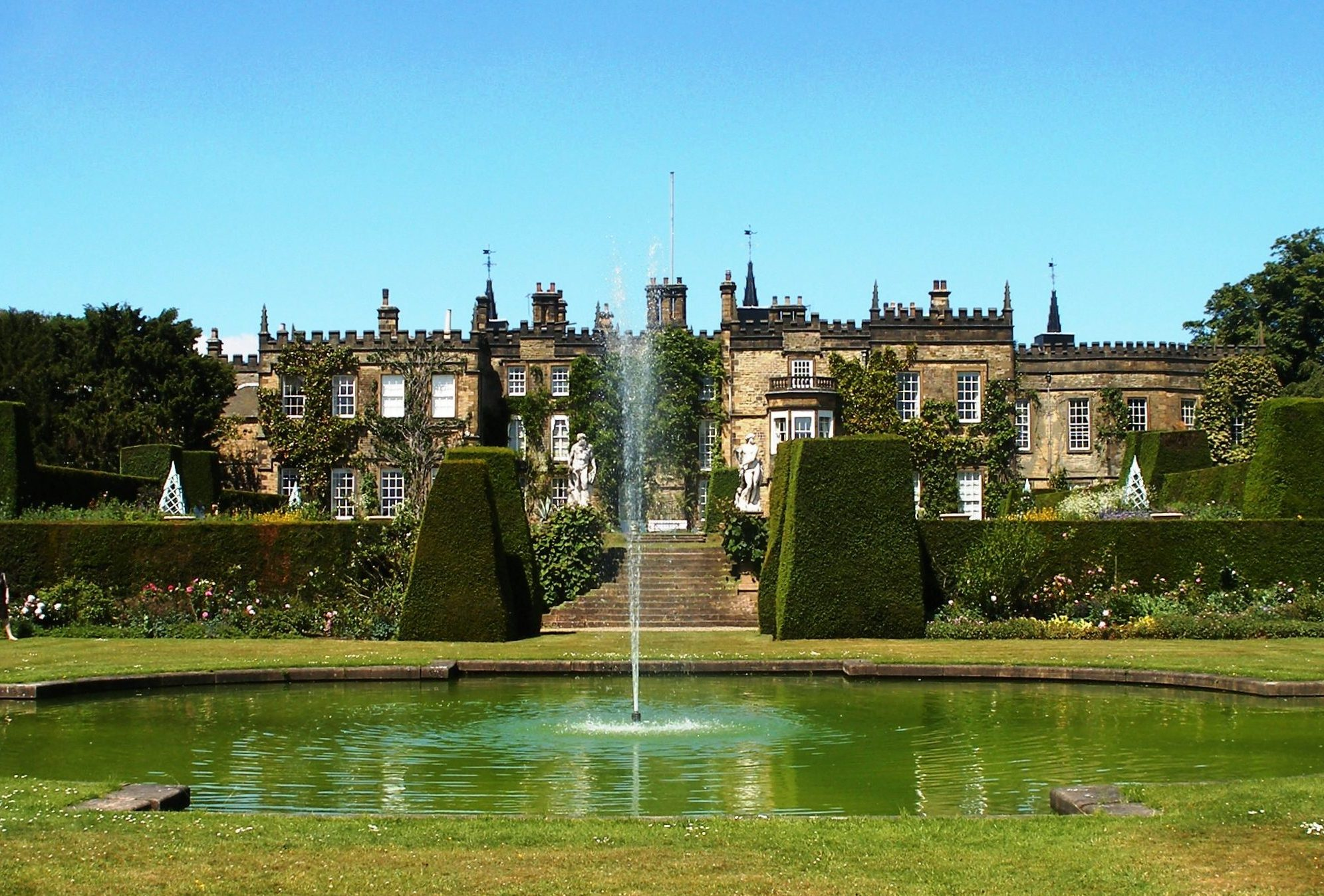
Renishaw Hall

- George Sitwell (c. 1601–1667), landowner and ironmaster, he built Renishaw Hall in 1626.
- Joseph Gales, Sr. (1761–1841), an American journalist, newspaper publisher and political figure
- Ann Alexander (1770–1861), a British Quaker, banker and bill broker.
- Joseph Gales, Jr. (1786–1860) an American journalist and the ninth mayor of Washington, D.C.
- Herbert Henry Elvin (1874–1949), trade union leader
- Paul West (1930–2015), a British-born American novelist, poet, and essayist.
- Joan Hinde (1933–2015), a British trumpeter and entertainer.

=== Sport ===
- Herbert Munday (1876–1961), footballer who played 314 games for Chesterfield Town.
- Walter Bussey (1904–1982), footballer who played 357 games including 185 for Stoke City
- Billie Nelson (1941-1974), Grand Prix motorcycling road racer, buried at Eckington Cemetery.
- Zoë Baker (born 1976), a former world record holder in swimming

== See also ==
- Listed buildings in Eckington, Derbyshire

== Photos ==
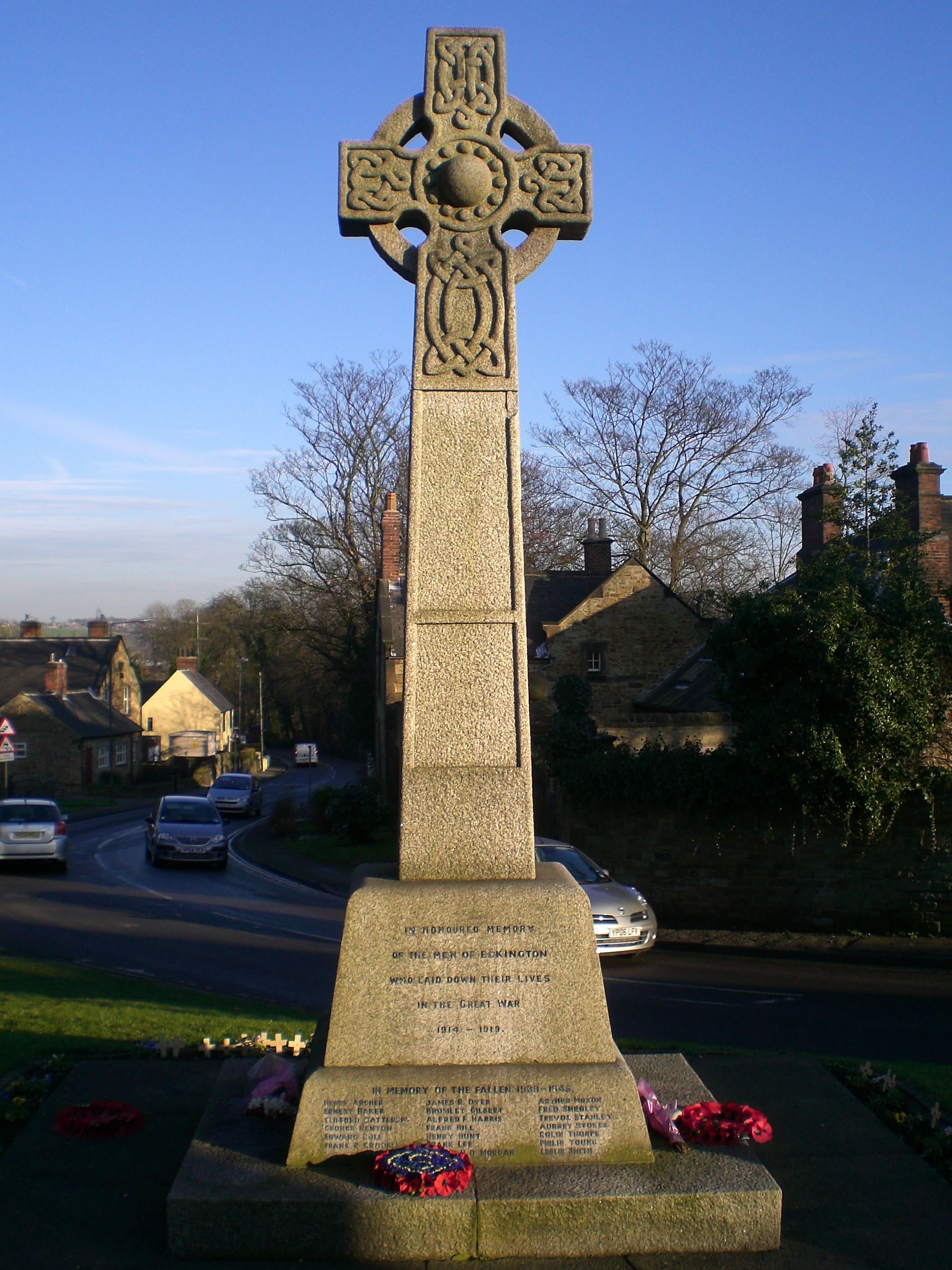
Eckington War Memorial

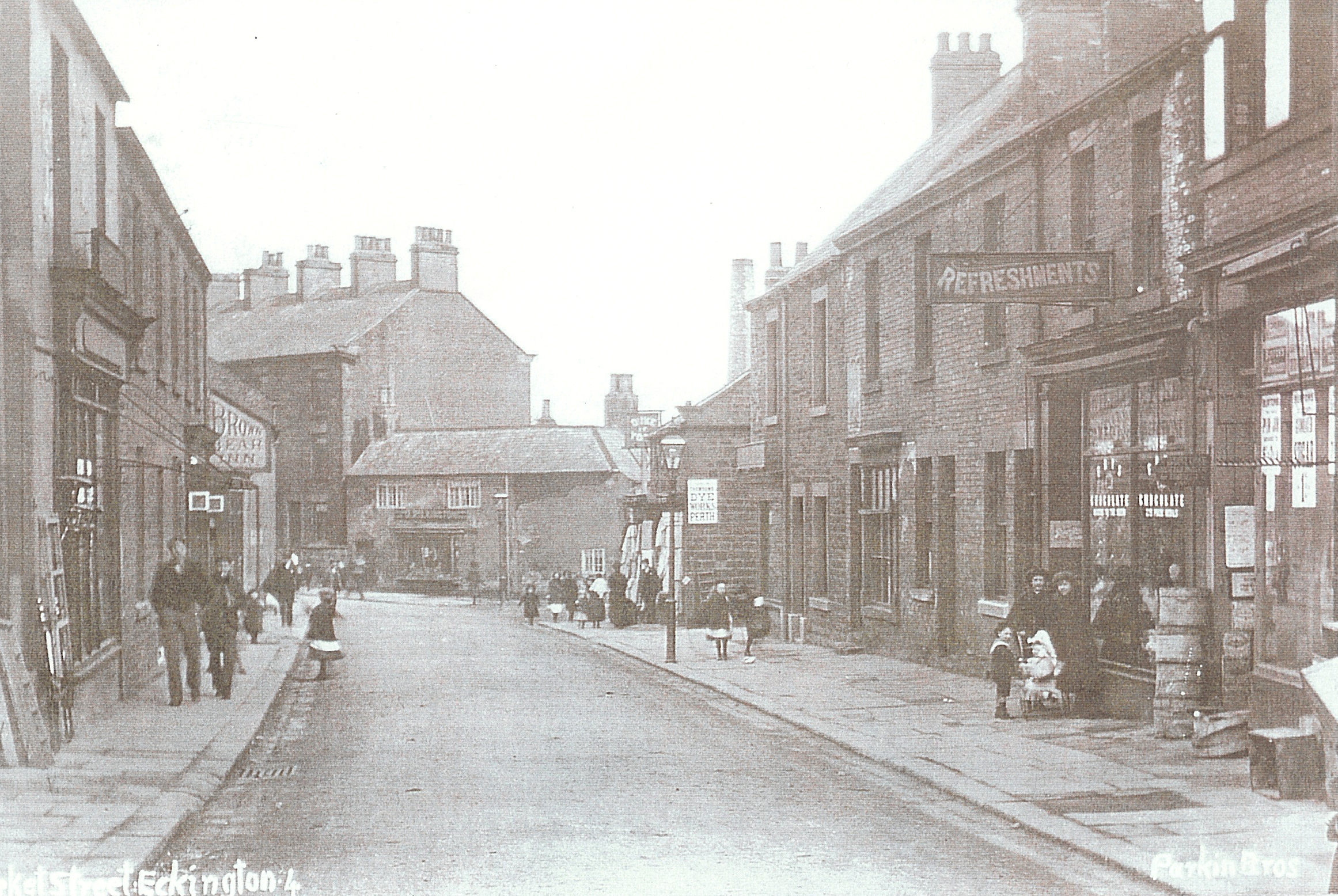
Old Market Street

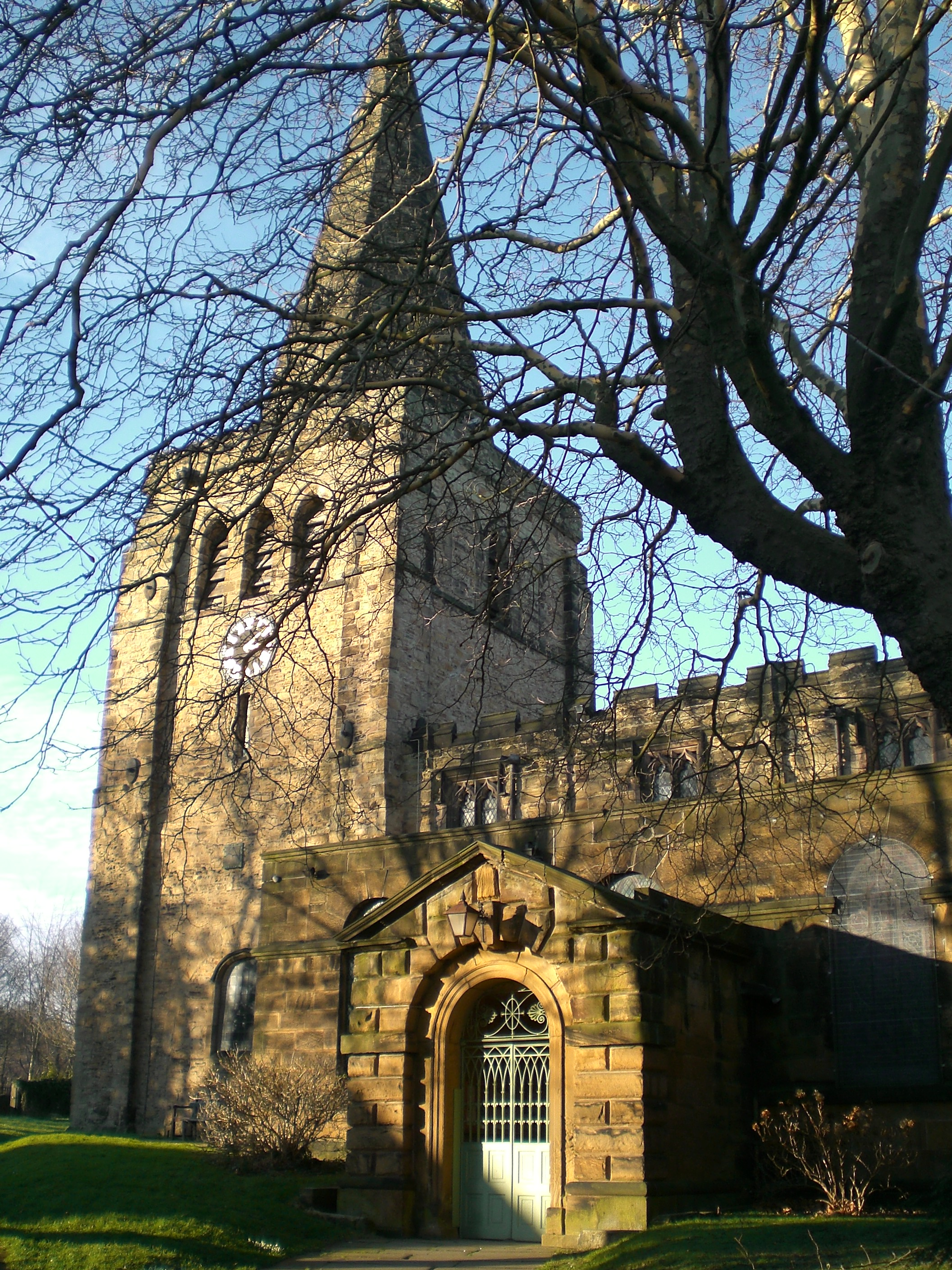
St Peter & St Paul's
