= George Sitwell (ironmaster) =

British landowner and ironmaster

George Sitwell JP
- Born: c. 1601; Eckington, Derbyshire
- Died: 1667
- Resting place: Eckington, Derbyshire
- Education: Derby School
- Known for: Ironmaster
- Spouse: Margaret Childers (m. 1667; died 1658)
- Children: 7
- Parent(s): George Sitwell; Mary Walker

George Sitwell JP (c. 1601–1667), was a 17th-century landowner and ironmaster. He built Renishaw Hall in Derbyshire in 1626. His company mined, forged, and rolled iron for use in Britain and overseas. It exported a complete rolling mill to the West Indies.

== Early life ==
Sitwell was born at Eckington in Derbyshire and baptized there on 15 March 1601. He was the eldest son of George Sitwell (1569–1607) and Mary (née Walker) Sitwell. When George was six, his father died, and later he attended Derby School. The Sitwells were freeholders who acquired land in and around Eckington and became gentry.

== Career ==
Sitwell became a Justice of the Peace, served as High Sheriff of Derbyshire in 1653 and was granted arms in 1660.

Sitwell exploited the mineral wealth beneath his estate, some coal but chiefly iron ore, and built a blast furnace in partnership with his mother's second husband, Henry Wigfall, at Plumbley a mile north west of Eckington in the 1630s. In 1652 Sitwell built a furnace at Foxbrooke close to Renishaw, which became the core of the largest ironworks in Derbyshire. Sitwell made saws at Pleasley and in 1656, installed a rolling and slitting mill at Renishaw to supply the rod iron used by numerous local nailmakers and scythe and sickle makers. Sitwell was closely involved in the operation of his works which produced pig and bar iron, castings, nails, saws and other goods for sale to tradesmen around Eckington and in London where he sent iron via the River Idle from Bawtry and by road. His works built a rolling mill for export to the West Indies. Sitwell regularly visited London to supervise sales of his products.

== Personal life ==
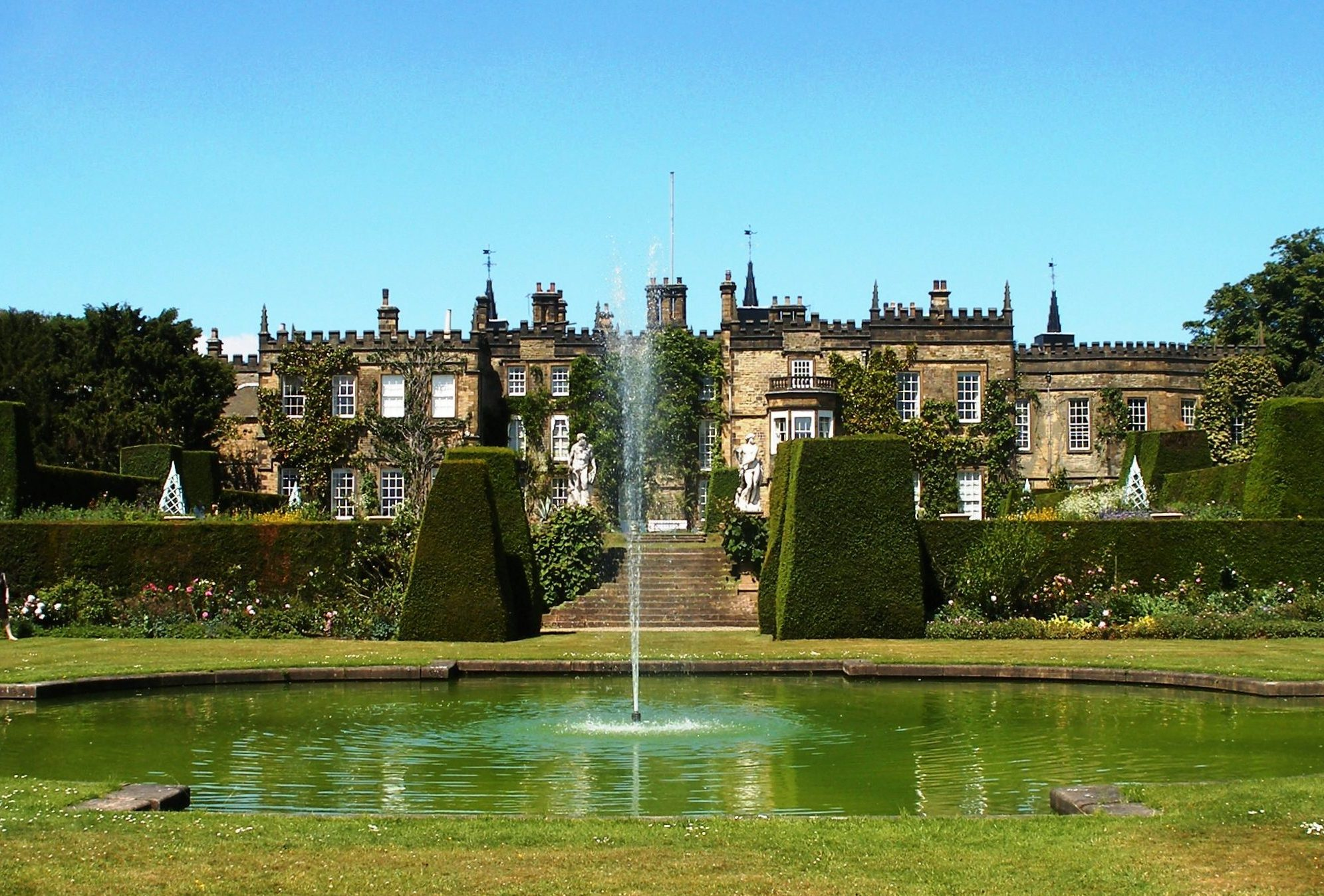
Renishaw Hall and garden

On 2 August 1667, Sitwell married Margaret Childers of Carr House, near Doncaster. Renishaw Hall was built for Sitwell in 1626 was the centre of his estate. Together, they were the parents of seven children. His eldest son continued his business at Renishaw and two other sons became iron merchants. In the 1690s the works were leased and though the Sitwells retained management of their collieries until the mid-18th century they accumulated wealth as landowners from the industrial enterprises on the estate.

Sitwell died in 1667 and was buried at Eckington. His memorial is in St Peter and St Paul's Church, Eckington.

=== Legacy ===
The Sitwell family became baronets and George Sitwell's descendants, Osbert, Edith and Sacheverell Sitwell were members of the intelligentsia in the 20th century. The family still own Renishaw Hall, although it is no longer owned by the Sitwell baronet.
