= Normanton Spring =

Hamlet in South Yorkshire, England

Coordinates: 53.355779°N 1.392360°W

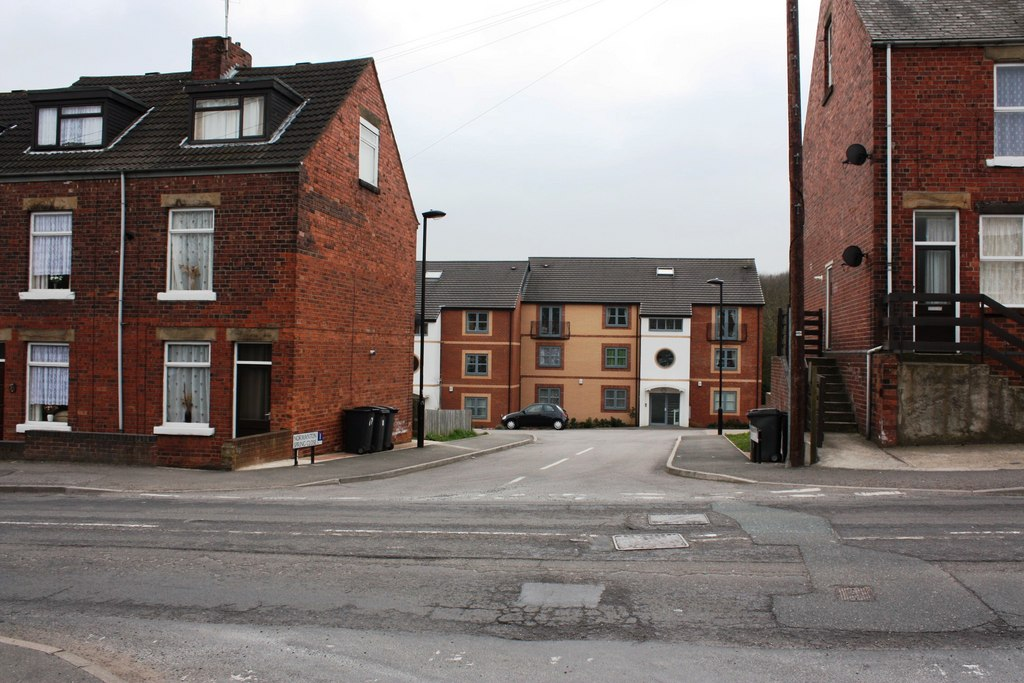
- Housing on Normanton Spring Road (B6064)

- Location within South Yorkshire
- OS grid reference: SK405844
- Metropolitan borough: Sheffield
- Metropolitan county: South Yorkshire
- Region: Yorkshire and the Humber
- Country: England
- Sovereign state: United Kingdom
- Post town: SHEFFIELD
- Postcode district: S13
- Police: South Yorkshire
- Fire: South Yorkshire
- Ambulance: Yorkshire

Normanton Spring (according to Ordnance Survey maps), also called Normanton Springs, is a suburb and former hamlet located 4 miles east of Sheffield City Centre, now classed as a historic township of the city. Due to expansion during the 1960s, the hamlet became a part of Sheffield.

== History ==
During the 20th century, the hamlet was known for its mining industry with the Birley Collieries being on both the east and west side respectively. The Shire Brook, which flows through the south of the hamlet, was noted for its use in the smithing of sickles and scythes, with Thomas Staniforth & Co based at neighbouring Hackenthorpe and Hutton & Co at Ridgeway, Derbyshire, both renting wheels along the brook, the most notable of which being the Nether Wheel.

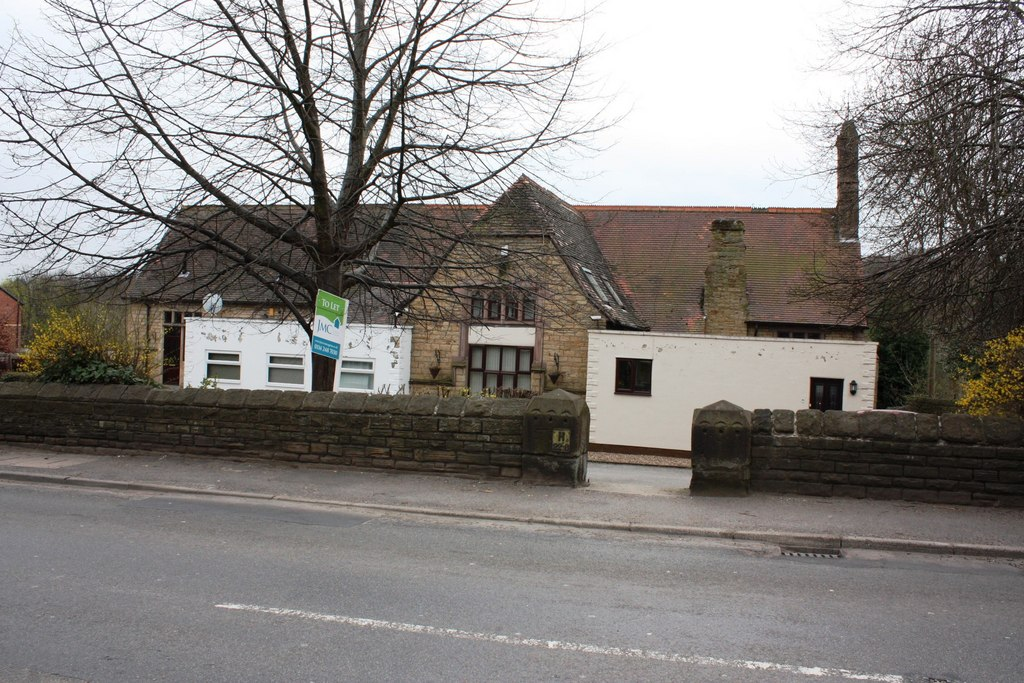
Former schoolhouse

A former schoolhouse which was in use during the 20th century has since been converted into residential use, and the mining pits are now part of the Shire Brook Valley Local Nature Reserve. The local pub, The Normanton Springs Inn, has also been demolished.
