= Sheffield Coal Company =

- Formation: 28 February 1805
- Dissolved: 1961
- Headquarters: Sheffield, South Yorkshire, England
- Location: Sheffield, South Yorkshire, England

The Sheffield Coal Company was a colliery owning and coal selling company with its head office situated in South Street, Sheffield, South Yorkshire, England.

== Formation ==
The Sheffield Coal Company was one of the oldest colliery companies in Sheffield being founded on 28 February 1805 to lease from the Duke of Norfolk and work coal pits in the Park area of the city. This lease expired in 1820 and the company was re-formed five years later.

The Houndsfield-Wilson Coal Company, owners of pits in Birley Vale merged with three individuals, with previous Sheffield Coal Company connections, named Bartholomew, Jeffcock and Dunn to form the new company and were later joined by John Jeffcock and William Littlewood from High Hazels, Darnall and John and Edwin Sorby of Attercliffe but with colliery interests at Dore House, near Orgreave.

The company worked below land of the Duke of Norfolk's estates and continued this until 1866 when they leased a large tract in the area of Woodhouse, Hackenthorpe and Beighton, at that time outside the Sheffield boundary, from the Earl Manvers.

In 1900 three of the S.C.C. directors took option leases on the new coalfield around Dinnington in order to develop and increase their available reserves. New sales offices were opened in London (following the completion of the Great Central Railway's line to the capital) and Bournemouth (which could also be reached, via Woodford Halse, from the London line).

In 1937 the United Steel Companies, which had coal mining interests at Orgreave and Treeton, made an offer for the Sheffield Coal Company of which the directors recommended acceptance, the deal being finalised on 24 June.

== Nationalisation and the end ==
The collieries of the Sheffield Coal Company, by that time owned by United Steel Companies, became part of the National Coal Board on nationalisation, but the company name, which had continued to exist under United Steel's ownership continued, along with others which became part of the NCB, until being finally wound up in 1961.

== Collieries ==
From their agreement with the Earl of Manvers the company sunk Birley West Colliery on a site in the Shirebrook Valley between Woodhouse and Hackenthorpe and began extracting coal by 1852. Within ten years plans were put forward to acquire more land and sink a new shaft. It was not until Spring 1887 that work commenced on the new shaft but the following year the part completed colliery gained the name Birley East Colliery (collectively these pits were referred to as Birley Collieries). Although a small amount of coal was being cut from the new colliery, brought to the surface at Birley West, it was not until 1890 when a new winding engine was installed that it fully came on stream. Later expansion came with mining rights being obtained from the Duke of Norfolk to mine below Handsworth Common. William Dunn Gainsford is listed as owner between 1877 until his death in 1926.

Sunk in 1844 by the Staveley Iron Company, North Staveley Colliery at Aston came under the SCC umbrella in the latter part of the 19th century. The colliery was situated to the north of, and set back from the later Manchester, Sheffield and Lincolnshire Railway line between Woodhouse and Kiveton.

The last colliery to be opened by the Sheffield Coal Company was Brookhouse Colliery which drew its first coal in 1929. Situated between Swallownest and Beighton it was adjacent to the main line of the Manchester, Sheffield and Lincolnshire Railway about a mile east of Woodhouse Junction. The site also housed coke ovens supplying metallurgical coke to the iron and steel industry.

The Site of the former Brookhouse Colliery is now part of the Rother Valley Country Park and Gulliver's Valley theme park. The site now falls in Rotherham Borough Councils area for planning.
