= Sheffield urban area =

Conurbation in the north of England

Sheffield Agglomeration Sheffield-Rotherham
- Built-up area
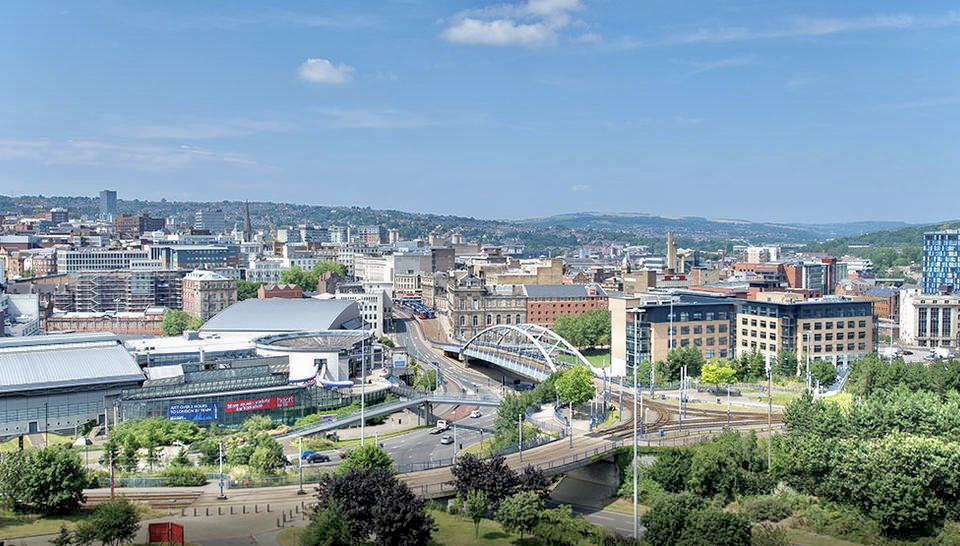
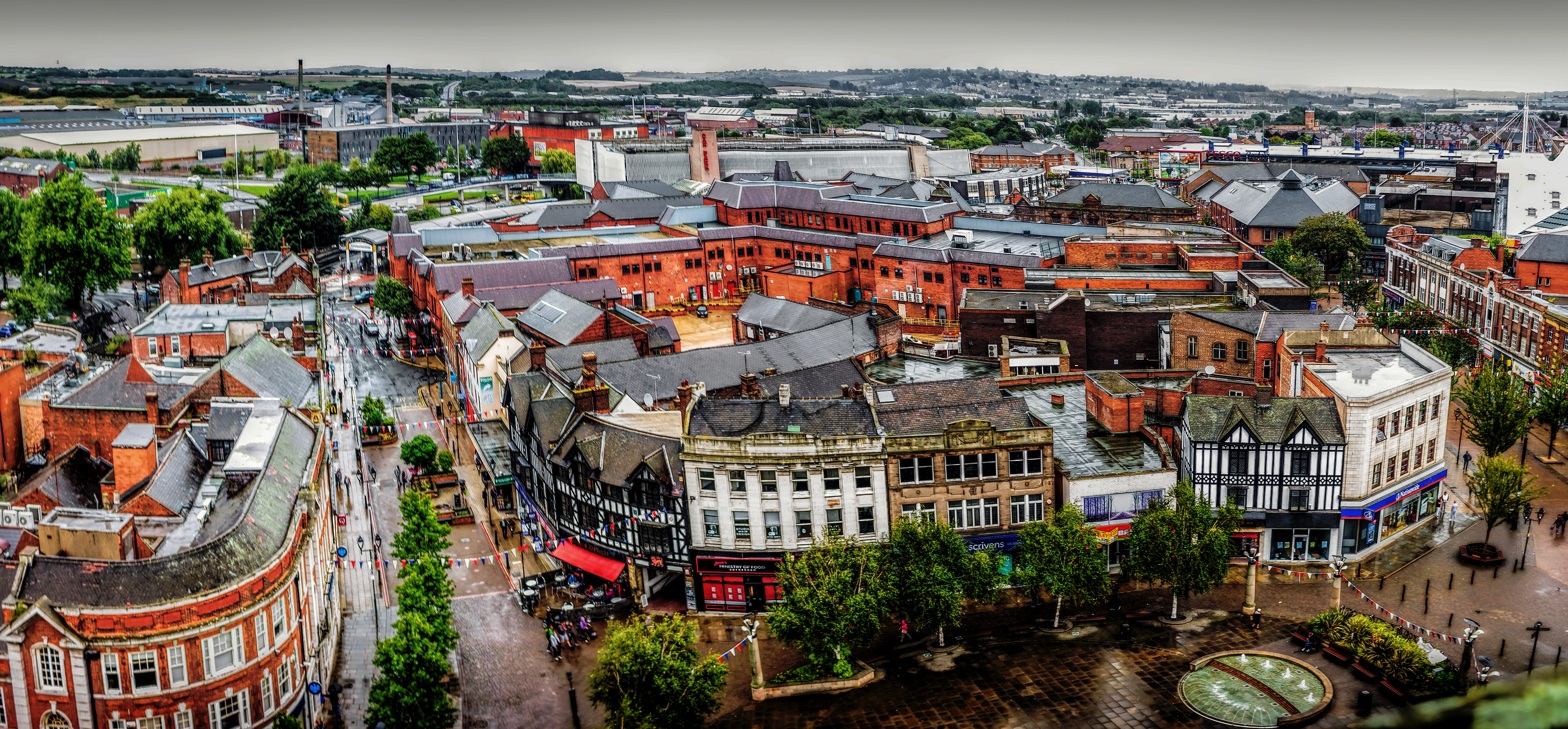
- Sheffield and Rotherham

- Built-up area's sub divisions
- Coordinates: 53.395°N 1.455°W
- Sovereign state: United Kingdom
- Country: England
- Region: Yorkshire and the Humber
- Ceremonial County: South Yorkshire
- Sub divisions: Sheffield; Rotherham; Chapeltown; Aughton; Mosborough; Beighton; Rawmarsh

Population
  - Total: 685,368
  - Rank: 8th
- Time zone: GMT (UTC)
  - Summer (DST): UTC+1 (BST)
- Postcode area: S

The Sheffield Urban Area is a conurbation in the north of England with a population of 685,368 according to the 2011 census. This was a 7% increase on the 2001 population of 640,720 making it the 8th largest conurbation in the United Kingdom and England's 6th largest. Named the Sheffield Urban Area by the Office for National Statistics, it must not be confused with the Sheffield City Region, a non-government term, although often used, particularly by the business community. In 2001 the population density of the urban area was 3,949.2 people per km^{2} by 2011 this had increased slightly to 4,092 people per km^{2}.

The city of Sheffield contributes just over two thirds of the population of the whole conurbation.

== Subdivisions ==
The conurbation's population is made up of the following subdivision, defined by the Office for National Statistics:

Subdivision	District	Population		
Subdivision	District	1991	2001	2011
Aughton (Note: Aughton is in the Swallownest subdivision in the 2011 census.)	Rotherham	14,122	13,456	-
Beighton (Note: Beighton is in the Sheffield subdivision for the 2011 census.)	Sheffield	9,467	10,676	-
Catcliffe (Note: Catcliffe was in the Rotherham subdivision for the 1991 and 2001 censuses, separated for the 2011 census.)	Rotherham	-	–	2,108
Chapeltown (Note: Chapeltown was no longer part of the Sheffield Built-up Area in the 2011 census.)	Sheffield	23,479	22,665	-
Eckington (Note: Eckington was a separate urban area in the 1991 and 2001 censuses.)	North East Derbyshire	-	–	7,386
Killamarsh (Note: Killamarsh was a separate urban area in the 1991 and 2001 censuses.)	North East Derbyshire	–	–	9,251
Mosborough/ Highlane (Note: Mosborough/Highlane is in the Sheffield subdivision for the 2011 census.)	Sheffield	15,222	18,585	-
Rawmarsh	Rotherham	18,085	18,210	18,498
Rotherham	Rotherham	121,380	117,262	109,691
Sheffield	Sheffield	431,607	439,866	518,090
Swallownest	Rotherham	-	–	15,022
Thorpe Hesley (Note: Thorpe Hesley was a separate urban area in the 1991 and 2001 censuses.)	Rotherham	-	–	4,427
Total population		633,362	640,720	685,369
Percentage change		–	+1.17%	+6.97%

== Nearby places ==
Settlements very close to the conurbation but not included in the official statistics include Wharncliffe Side and Oughtibridge, which are separated from Hillsborough by Worrall and a half-mile stretch of the A6102 Middlewood Road North and the towns of Wath upon Dearne, Brampton Bierlow, Swinton, Mexborough, Darfield and Conisbrough which are part of the Dearne Valley Urban Area and are separated from Rawmarsh by the Wentworth Road, with the A633 and Dearne Valley railway lines.
Slightly further afield, Dronfield, in Derbyshire, is around half a mile away from the Greenhill area of the city along the A61 and B6158.

== See also ==
- List of Settlements in South Yorkshire by population
- List of conurbations in the United Kingdom
- List of metropolitan areas in the United Kingdom
