= Birley Spa =

Public bath in Sheffield, South Yorkshire, England

Coordinates: 53.3478°N 1.3867°W

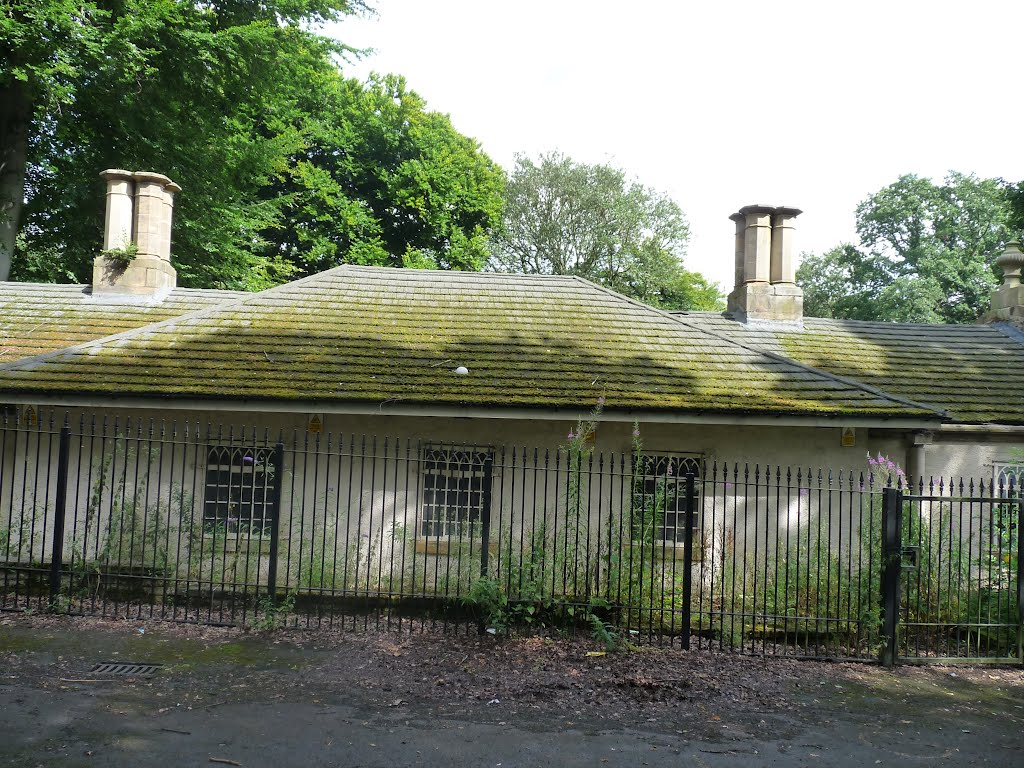
- The front of the building in August 2012
- Interactive map of Birley Spa
- Location: Hackenthorpe, Sheffield, South Yorkshire
- Built: 1843; 182 years ago
- Architectural style: Neoclassical style

Listed Building – Grade II
- Official name: Birley Spa Community Centre
- Designated: 28 June 1973
- Reference no.: 1246768

Birley Spa is a community bath hall and a Victorian bathhouse in the Hackenthorpe district of the City of Sheffield, England. It is a Grade II listed building.

== History ==
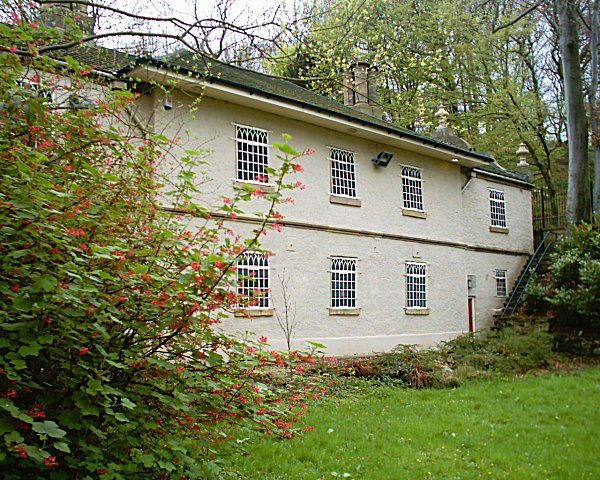
The rear elevation facing north

The bath house was commissioned by Charles Pierrepont, 2nd Earl Manvers, who was the lord of the manor of Beighton as a hotel with spa baths beneath. The site he selected, in the Shire Brook Valley, was built into the hill on the south side of the valley. It was designed in the neoclassical style, built in brick with a cement render and was officially opened in 1843. The design involved a single-storey main frontage of five bays facing south towards Birley Spa Road. The central section of the three bays was slightly projected forward. It was fenestrated by casement windows and at roof level there were quadruple chimney stacks and urns at the apex at both ends. Internally, the main room was an oval plunge bath on the lower ground floor.

In the mid-19th century, a committee was created to manage the facility. It consisted of Thomas Staniforth from the Thomas Staniforth & Co sickle works, Edward Hobson, George Cox of Beighton and John Tillotson, schoolmaster of Beighton. A man named George Eadon was selected from eleven applicants who applied for the post of manager of the 'Bath Hotel', and was paid a salary of twenty pounds and was provided free rent and coal.

By the time of the 1920s and 1230s, the grounds of the bath house were transformed into a pleasure ground for children. Mr Moulson and William Smith were the proprietors at this time. The grounds featured a wishing well, a sand pit, swing boats, and a paddling pool. The large lake behind the house was used for boating and fishing. There was also a 'wonder tree' in the wooded area beside the house, which was a large oak tree said to be over 1,000 years old. When the Second World War began in 1939, the grounds were closed.

The grounds was transferred to Sheffield Corporation in the 1950s, and in the early 2000s it became part of the Shire Brook Valley Local Nature Reserve.

The building was restored in 2000/2002 and for a time was open for tours by the public, but this had ceased by 2014. In June 2018, there was renewed interest in the building after the council announced its intention to sell the building. The sale was later withdrawn and the building became an asset of community value.

In May 2025, the Victorian Society included the building in its list of the 10 most endangered buildings in the country.
