= Hackenthorpe Cricket Club =

Cricket club

Hackenthorpe Cricket Club was a cricket club in Hackenthorpe, Sheffield, England. Although the team is now a local Yorkshire team, prior to Hackenthorpe being incorporated into Sheffield in the 1930s, the village and team was located in Derbyshire county.

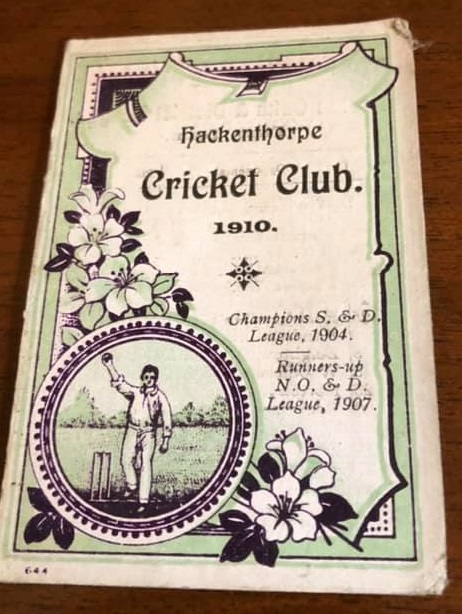
Hackenthorpe Cricket Club 1910 program

== History ==
The Cricket club was started due to the efforts of local businessman James Hounsfield that resided at Hackenthorpe Hall. Mr Hounsfield originally gave the club a free 40-year lease on the cricket ground that today is found next to Rainbow Forge school. A pavilion was built which contained an oak chest in which bats and other equipment were stored. The players arranged a set one night per week practice. Many local families in the village were associated with the cricket club, including the Hounsfields themselves, Havenhands and Staniforths. In the early years the team relied on horse and wagon to get the players around the county for matches. Local driver John Hempsell arranged to pick up the players from either of the villages inns, the Bluebell or the Sportsman Inn.

One of the first recorded games took place on 12 May 1888 and involved a H.B Lund, who was schoolmaster at Hackenthorpe Infants School scoring at Shirecliffe Hall. The score for this match was Hackenthorpe 10 for 60, Shirecliffe Hall 10 for 43. The first home match recorded was played against Collegiate. This match ended with Hackenthorpe winning by 21 runs.

The Hackenthorpe team recorded on 12 May 1888 consisted of:

- Thomas Hounsfield
- J. Hounsfield
- F. Rippon
- J. Frith
- M. Helliwell
- T. Booth
- W. Henshaw
- A. Booth
- A. Renshaw
- H. Barker and
- T. Wostenholm

The Hackenthorpe Miner's Welfare was started in 1925 when funds were granted from the Miners' Welfare Central Fund. A new cricket pitch was laid in nearby Beighton in 1926 and the Miners' Welfare Cricket Club formed in 1928 when twelve pounds was offered to the Hackenthorpe Cricket Club. On 6 July 1929 the official opening of the new committee was performed. The first secretary of the Miners Welfare was Frederick Lambert Jr. who was then followed by Herbert Staniforth. In 1927 Tommy Harrison took over and would remain secretary for thirty years.

The team would then go on to win the Norton and District Trophy in 1938.

With the outbreak of World War II, the team disbanded in 1939 and then reformed in 1946.

== Notable players ==
Two notable players that played for Hackenthorpe went on to play for Derbyshire County Cricket Club, Thomas Hounsfield and Freddie Taylor.

== See also ==
- Beighton Miners Welfare F.C.
