= Hounsfield =

Hounsfield may refer to:

== Places ==
=== Canada ===
- Hounsfield Heights/Briar Hill, Calgary, an inner suburban neighbourhood in northwest Calgary, Alberta, Canada

=== United States ===
- Hounsfield, New York, a town in Jefferson County, New York, United States

== People with the surname ==
- Godfrey Hounsfield (1919–2004), English electrical engineer who shared the 1979 Nobel Prize for Physiology or Medicine
- Harold William Hounsfield Riley (1877–1946), Canadian politician
- Reginald Hounsfield (1882–1939), English footballer
- Thomas Hounsfield (1910–1994), English cricketer

== See also ==
- Hounsfield scale, a quantitative measure of radiodensity used in evaluating CT scans
