= Shire Brook =

Waterway in South Yorkshire, England

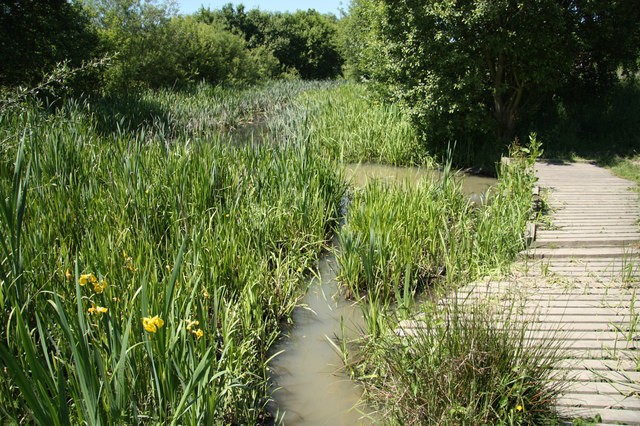
Shire Brook

Shire Brook is a small stream in the south eastern part of the City of Sheffield in South Yorkshire, England. It rises in the suburb of Gleadless Townend and flows in a general easterly direction for 4 miles (6.5 km) to its confluence with the River Rother between Beighton and Woodhouse Mill. In the past the brook has been both the border of Yorkshire and Derbyshire and between the sees of Canterbury and York. The course of the stream has been influenced by human intervention in the 20th century with the brook being diverted underground and flowing through culverts on three occasions as it traverses locations which were formerly landfill sites and extensive railway sidings.

== Course ==
Shire Brook rises as an underground spring at a height of 630 feet (192 m) above sea level beneath the Red Lion public house in the Gleadless Townend residential area at 53.3447°N 1.4256°W. The Brook runs in a culvert from beneath the public house before emerging into the open on land between Seagrave Crescent and Lister Crescent. It initially flows NE going beneath housing to emerge on the Jaunty Park recreation and sports grounds as an insignificant and rubbish strewn stream running at the rear of the Birley Vale Industrial Estate. It is then joined by an unnamed stream which originates from a spring in Hollinsend Park. After 1 mile (1.5 km) it passes under the A6135 (Birley Moor Road) and swings easterly, disappearing underground, as it flows for almost 0.6 miles (1 km) through a culvert beneath the former Normanton Spring landfill site which has now been landscaped and planted with trees. The brook emerges and continues its journey east going through Wickfield Heath and under the A57 road (Mosborough Parkway) before flowing through the Shire Brook Valley Local Nature Reserve on the northern side of the A57.

At this point the brook receives its only sizeable tributary, an unnamed stream which rises at Birley Spa at a height of 330 feet (100 m) above sea level, flowing NE down a gorge for a kilometre to the Shire Brook valley. The Shire Brook then disappears underground again as it runs beneath the former Beighton Road landfill site just to the north of Beighton before entering an area of wetland rich in bird life known as Beighton Marsh. The final 220 yards (200 m) of Shire Brook’s journey before it joins the Rother is again through an underground culvert beneath the site of the former Woodhouse Junction railway sidings which is now disused brownfield land which was being considered by Network Rail as a location for a new National Engineering Centre before plans were rejected in April 2008. Shire Brook enters the River Rother at a height of 121 feet (37 m) above sea level at approximately 53.3562°N 1.3394°W.

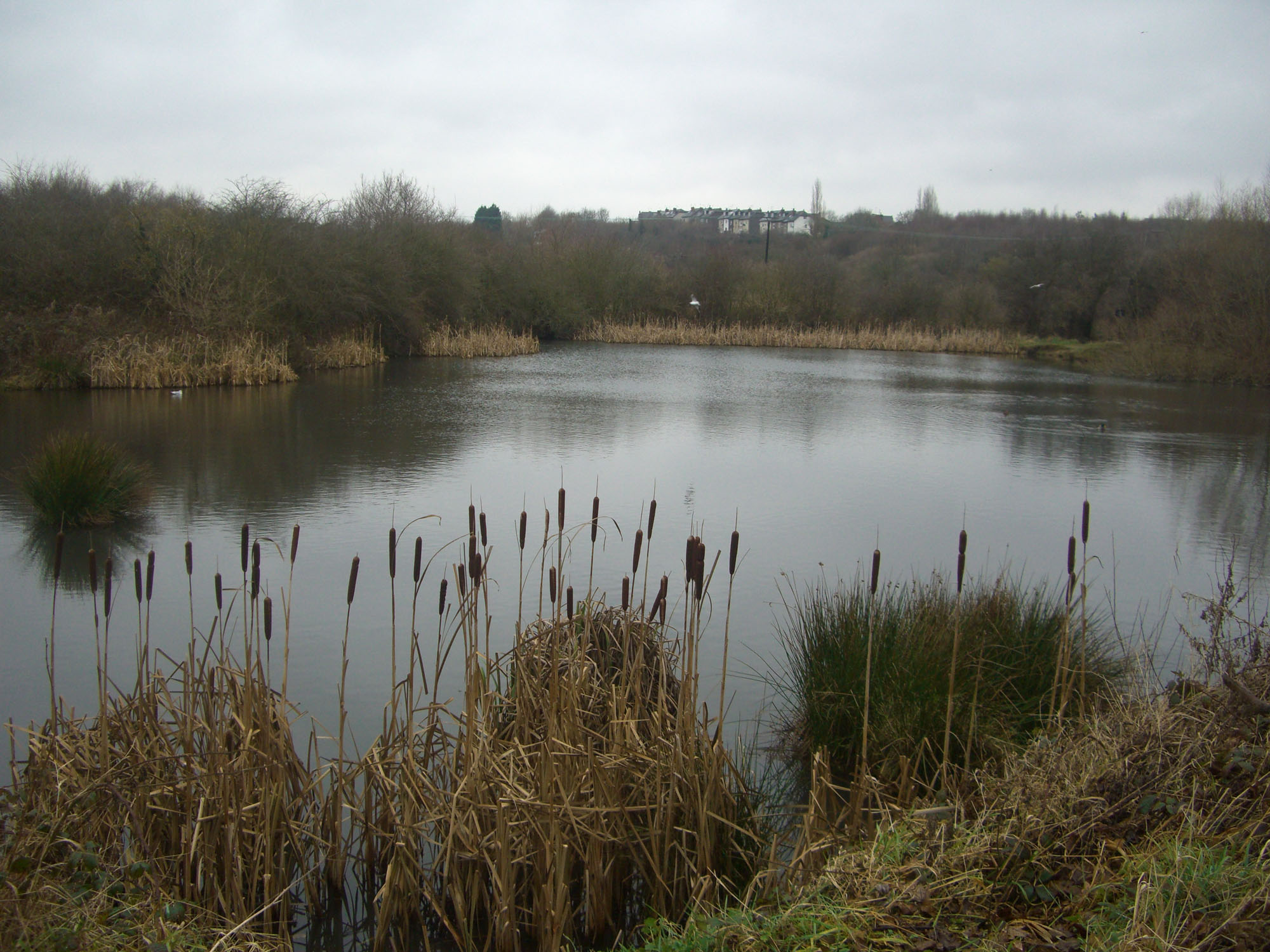
Carr Forge Dam is a haven for animals and plants. The houses of Woodhouse are in the background.

== History ==
=== Ancient boundary ===
Shire Brook has been an important boundary line for over a thousand years. In Anglo-Saxon times the Brook formed the boundary between the kingdoms of Mercia and Northumbria. For 900 years the Brook marked the division between Yorkshire and Derbyshire, which gave the Brook its name. It was also known informally as County Brook and Der Brook, Der being short for Derbyshire. Another alternative name for the brook was Ochre Dike, due to the run off from mines in the valley which made the water a yellow brown colour.

In 1967 the City of Sheffield expanded its borders south to take in the suburbs of Hackenthorpe and Mosborough and the Brook no longer marked the frontier between the two counties. The Brook also marks the boundary between the Ecclesiastical provinces of York and Canterbury.

=== Former industry ===
Up to the early 18th century the Shire Brook valley was mostly an agricultural area. However sustained industrial development came into the valley at the start of the 18th century and actually started in Tudor times when Christopher Chapman was producing cutlery at Carr Forge in the mid-16th century.

Like many of Sheffield’s water courses, the Shire Brook’s water power was harnessed for turning water wheels for industry before the coming of steam and electricity. During the 19th century there were five wheels operating in the valley producing power to sharpen scythes and sickles. Several of the small mill ponds that once fed the water wheels still exist along the course of the river. The Upper and Lower Sickle wheels were in the Normanton Spring area, about 1 mile (1.5 km) from the Brook’s source. Further downstream were Carr Forge and Rainbow Forge while the Cliff Wheel was located just under 1,100 yards (1 km) from the Brooks confluence with the River Rother. Notable owners and users of these wheels were the Staniforth family that ran the Thomas Staniforth & Co sickleworks in Hackenthorpe. The dam at Rainbow Forge no longer holds water and its embankments and stonework are difficult to find amongst the undergrowth. Carr Forge Dam is the best preserved area of water in the valley although its wheel and cottages have now vanished. The site of the Lower Sickle Wheel (also known as Nether Wheel) was excavated in 1988 revealing the foundations of the mill buildings and the pits which held the grinding wheels.

Small scale coal mining took place in the valley from the early 18th century, however it was not until the opening of the Birley Collieries that large amounts of coal were extracted. Birley West Colliery was located just to the south of Normanton Spring, production lasted from 1855 until 1908. Birley East, situated between Hackenthorpe and Woodhouse opened in 1888 and operated until 1948. Shire Brook was culverted under both locations which became landfill sites when the pits closed. Both landfill sites have been capped off and landscaped in recent years.

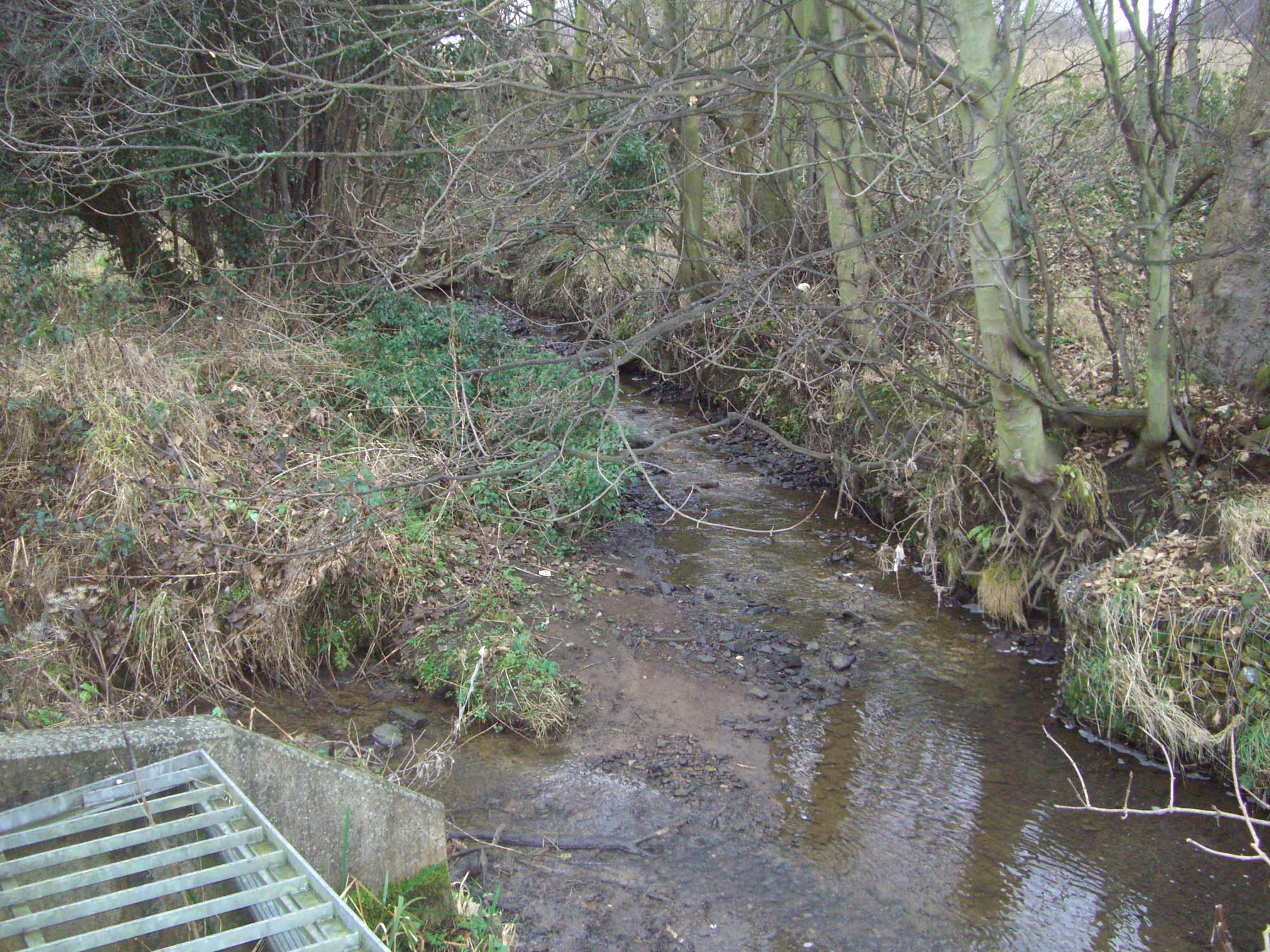
Shire Brook as it runs through the nature reserve. The stream from Birley Spa flows in on the left.

== Shire Brook Valley Local Nature Reserve ==
The Shire Brook Valley Local Nature Reserve was established in 1999 and extends over an area of approximately 100 hectares. The reserve is based around the former site of the Coisley Hill Sewage Works which closed in the early 1990s. The managers office has been converted into a visitors centre. The reserve includes Beighton Marsh, an area of reed-grass swamp, situated at its eastern end, which supports birds such as reed bunting, grasshopper warbler and barn owl, as well as mammals such as harvest mouse and water vole. The Birley Spa Bath House, a grade II listed building was restored with a Heritage Lottery Fund grant in 2001. Also within the reserve is Wickfield Plantation, one of the few remaining areas of lowland heath and coppiced oak woodland inside Sheffield. The Reserve contain Carr Forge Dam which is fed by the stream which comes down from Birley Spa and is a valuable location for wildlife. New ponds were created in the same area in 1993 to mark the centenary of the City of Sheffield. The Centenary Ponds were opened by Clive Betts on 18 June 1993.

== Pollution ==
The Shire Brook was heavily polluted for many years, as storm drain overflow took raw sewage into the brook and then into the River Rother which was known as one of the most polluted rivers in Europe in the early 1990s. In 2005/6 much work was done to control the overflow with several storm flow storage tanks built in the Shire Brook valley. Yorkshire Water were fined £5,000 plus costs when pumps failed at the Linley Bank Sewage Pumping Station, Hackenthorpe on 30 and 31 March 2006 allowing untreated sewage to affect an 870-yard (800 m) stretch of the brook.
