= Christ Church, Hackenthorpe =

Church in South Yorkshire, England

Coordinates: 53.343360°N 1.378840°W

Christ Church is a church situated in Hackenthorpe, a suburb of the City of Sheffield. It is located on Sheffield road, and was built in 1899. The church was largely funded by local land owner James Houndsfield and The Earl Manvers along with many smaller donations.

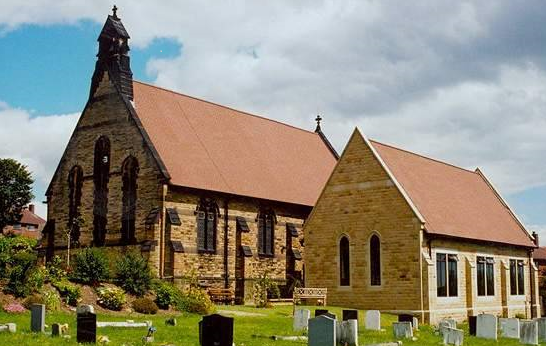
Christ Church, Hackenthorpe

== History and architecture ==
Before 1900, the residents of Hackenthorpe attended the parish church in Beighton, Church of St Mary the Virgin. Methodists in the village also had a purpose built chapel which stood on Main Street for a number of years, however this was soon demolished. There was also a purpose built mission room which stood on Church Lane. This building was later turned into a co-operative grocery store and finally a button factory ran by Charles Singleton Ltd.

In 1899 the village got its own church. The Earl Manvers donated £500 and promised the acre of land which the church now stands on Sheffield Road. James Hounsfield, local resident at Hackenthorpe Hall also gave £250. In total £1,320 was raised and the church was constructed.

It is recorded that the foundation stone was laid on 4 June 1898 by Viscount Newark, the Earl Manvers eldest son. Beneath the foundation stone was laid a coffin which contained a newspaper of the day, parchment bearing the names of the church committee and a coin of the realm.

A chapel arch was originally planned, however this needed to be rebuilt and strengthened and due to lack of funds, this was never replaced. This shortage of money was in spite of £250 promised from James Houndsfield if the chapel was built in his lifetime and also a further £25 offer from John Jubb from Drakehouse under the same conditions. Before the arch the total cost of the church stood at £2,550 and a century later, the arch is still bricked up.

The dedication, Christ Church took place on 11 November 1899.

== Hackenthorpe War Memorial ==
A memorial stands outside the church featuring the names of Hackenthorpe residents that lost their lives in World War I and World War II. The memorial is Grade-II listed.

The Memorial reads:

1914 The Great War 1919
*Reginald Tagg 1916
*Clifford Renshaw 1916
*Benjamin Crookes 1917
*Harry B. Oxley 1917
*Edward Gradden 1918
*Fred Ellis 1918
*John Rose 1918

1939 World War 1945
*Walter H Smith 1941
*Douglas N.B Barker 1942
*George Lilley 1943
*Richard Bristow 1943
*William H Shaw 1944
*Arthur Thompson 1944
*Gladstone Poyntor 1944

== List of rectors ==
Prior to 1973 the post was attached to the Beighton parish

- E.P Drury - September 1955 - June 1960
- Sidney Howard - November 1960 - November 1966
- Donald Reece - April 1967 - September 1970
- David John Young - February 1971 - August 1975
- A. Whiteley September 1975

Steve Willett, father of golfer Danny Willett is the current rector.
