= Highlane, Derbyshire =

Hamlet in Derbyshire, England

Coordinates: 53.3348°N 1.3934°W

Highlane
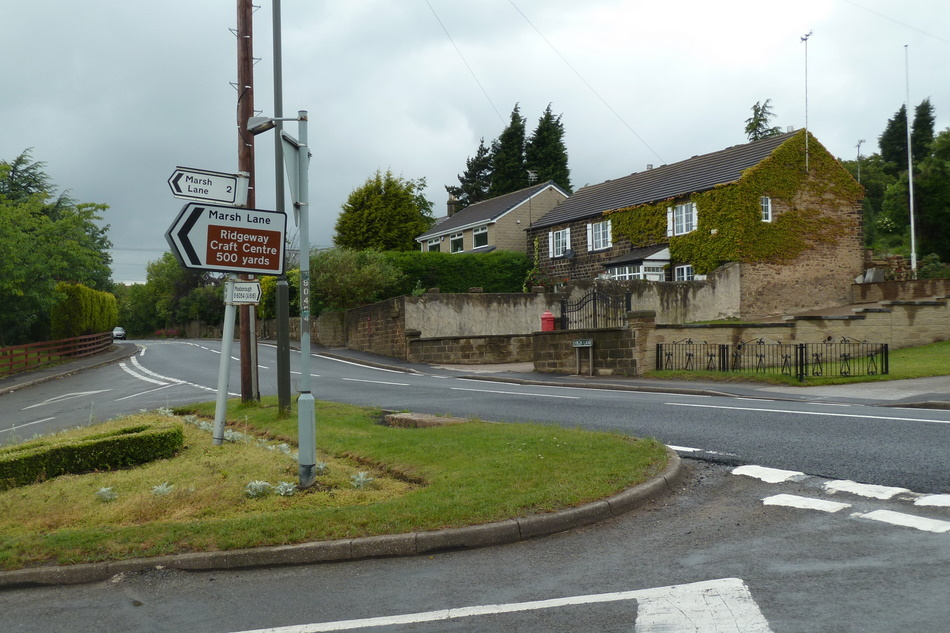

- Location within Derbyshire
- Civil parish: Eckington
- District: North East Derbyshire
- Shire county: Derbyshire
- Region: East Midlands
- Country: England
- Sovereign state: United Kingdom
- Police: Derbyshire
- Fire: Derbyshire
- Ambulance: East Midlands

Highlane, or High Lane is a hamlet in the civil parish of Eckington, in the North East Derbyshire district, in the county of Derbyshire, England.

== Geography ==
The hamlet is located north of Ridgeway and Ford, west of Mosborough, and south of Frecheville and Hackenthorpe. It lies on the border with South Yorkshire.

== History ==
The area was known for its sickle and scythe manufacturing, with the Phoenix Works at Highlane being the home of Hutton and Co.
