= Brookhouse Colliery =

Former coal mine in South Yorkshire

Coordinates: 53°21′13″N 1°19′10″W

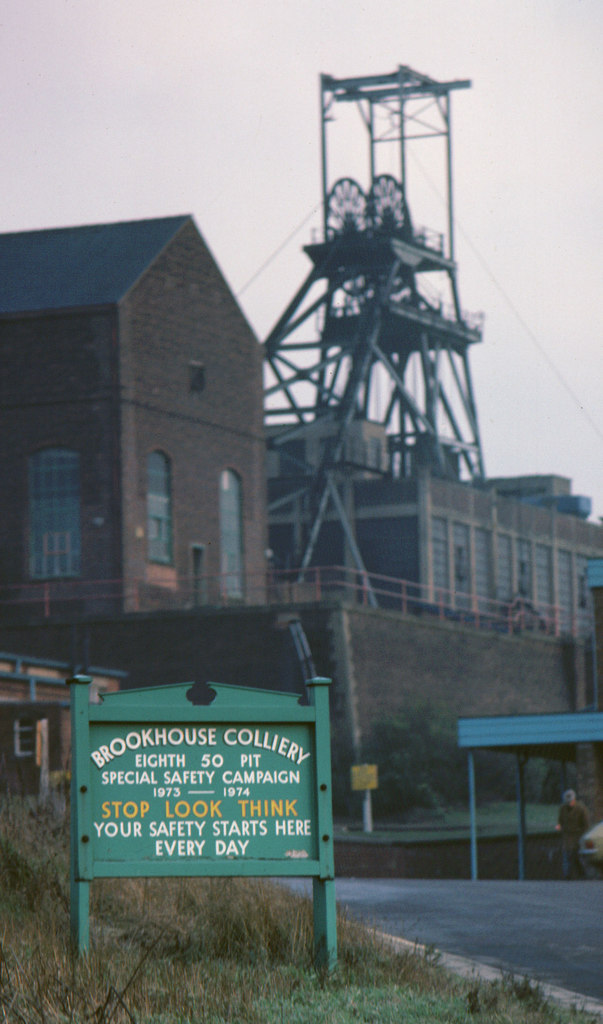
Brookhouse Colliery in 1977

Brookhouse Colliery was a coal mine within the Metropolitan Borough of Rotherham, South Yorkshire, England. It was operational between 1929 and 1985.

== History ==
To develop coal seams in the area, the Sheffield Coal Company opened a new colliery between Swallownest and Beighton, at that time on the borders of Rotherham Rural District and Derbyshire but now just within the borough of Rotherham. The company, which became part of the United Steel Companies in 1937, already owned other collieries in the area, particularly the Birley Collieries and that at Aston Common, known as North Staveley Colliery.

Brookhouse was not opened until 1929 and linked with its neighbours underground. The site also included coke ovens and by-products plants supplying metallurgical coke to the iron and steel industry, particularly those in Scunthorpe. The coking plant ceased production in 1981, several years before the colliery itself closed.

The colliery passed to the National Coal Board on nationalisation in 1947 and was closed on 26 October 1985.

After closure the site became part of a long-held plan by Rotherham Borough Council, Sheffield City Council and North East Derbyshire District Council to create the northern extension to the Rother Valley Country Park. The first part of the plan, the southern part of which was commenced in 1976, was to extract coal by opencasting from the area before commencement of landscaping. Further opencast extraction after closure recovered significant additional coal from the site before restoration.
