= Greenside House =

Building in Sheffield, England

Coordinates: 53°20′41″N 1°22′19″W

Greenside House is an 18th-century residence located in Hackenthorpe, Sheffield, England. The building is estimated to have been built around 1825 and is a Grade II listed building.

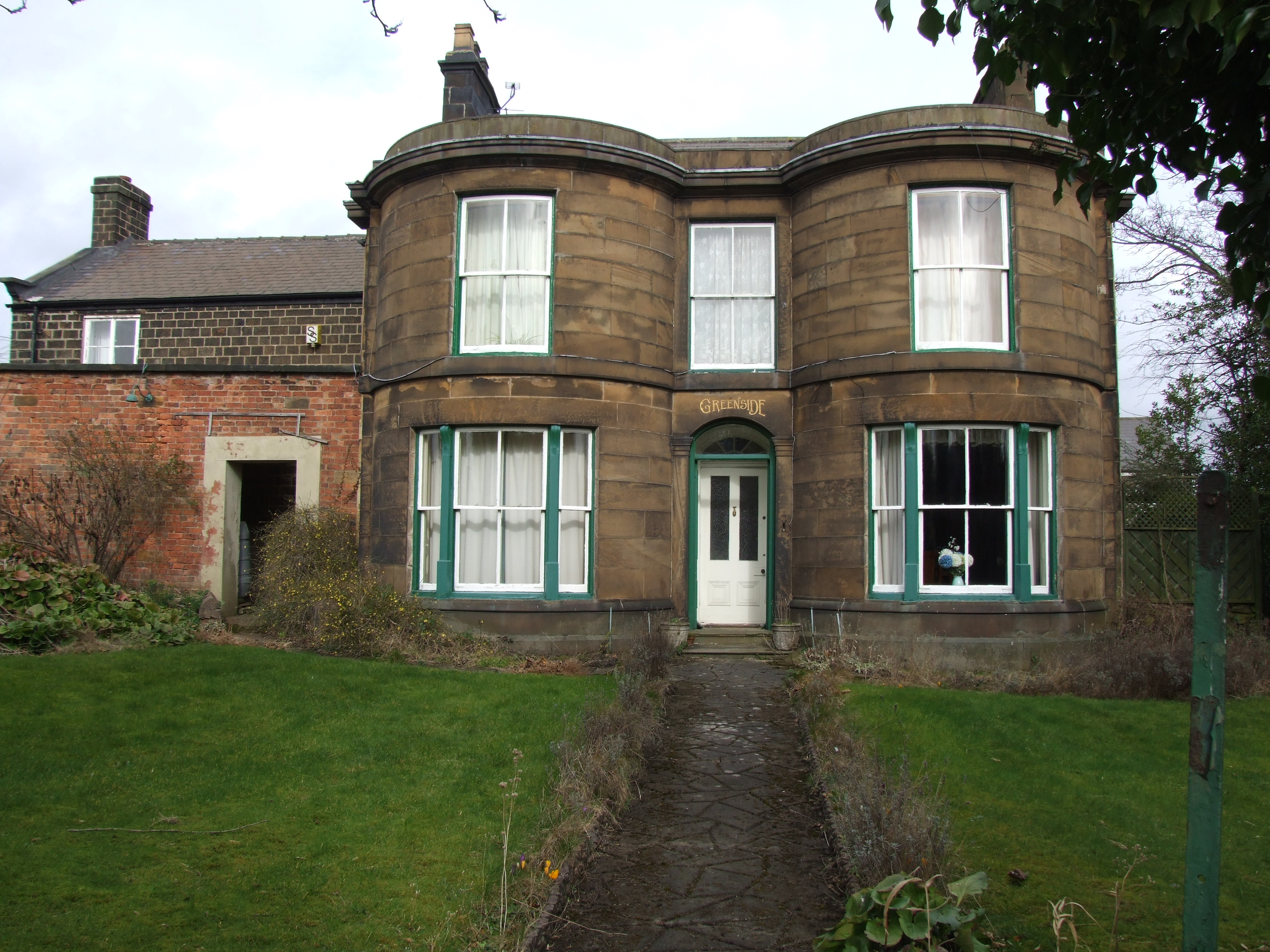
Greenside House

== History ==
Prior to the 1930s, Hackenthorpe was a village in north Derbyshire county, however following the war, the city of Sheffield experienced a population boom and the village was incorporated into the city, and in the process moving into the county of South Yorkshire.

Historically the building was the residence of the Staniforth family who operated the Thomas Staniforth & Co Scytheworks between the 1740s and early 20th century. The business was operated out of the workshops next to the residence. The building stayed in the family through to the early 20th century. John Hibbard and his wife Louisa (née Staniforth) lived in the house in the early 20th century. The house is notable for its unique style with curved frontal brickwork and the evidence of a side workshop.

During the 20th Century the house was the residence of the Waddington family, and later Dr George Pagdin, the village doctor, who was a cousin of the artist Charles Mozley.

== See also ==
- Listed buildings in Sheffield
