= Thomas Hounsfield =

English cricketer

Personal information
- Full name: Thomas Douglas Hounsfield
- Born: 29 April 1910; Hackenthorpe, Derbyshire, England
- Died: 8 February 1994 (aged 83); Richmond, North Yorkshire, England
- Batting: Right-handed

Domestic team information
- Years: Team
- 1938–1939: Derbyshire
- First-class debut: 16 July 1938 Derbyshire v Leicestershire
- Last First-class: 19 August 1939 Derbyshire v Nottinghamshire

Career statistics
Competition	First-class
Matches	16
Runs scored	274
Batting average	13.04
100s/50s	0/1
Top score	56
Catches/stumpings	7/–
- Source: CricketArchive, February 2012

Thomas Douglas Hounsfield (29 April 1910 — 8 February 1994) was an English cricketer who played first-class cricket for Derbyshire between 1938 and 1939.

Hounsfield was born at Hackenthorpe Farm, Derbyshire to James Hounsfield and Edith Wilson. In his youth he played for the local Hackenthorpe Cricket Club. He started playing for Derbyshire in 1937 in the second XI. He made his first-class debut in the 1938 season in July in a match against Leicestershire, when he made 14 in his second innings. He played one more match for the county in 1938 but played mainly in the second XI. In the 1939 season he put in sixteen first team appearances and made his top score of 56 against the touring West Indies. During the Second World War while the County Championship was suspended, he continued to play regularly for Derbyshire until 1945.

Hounsfield was a right-handed lower-order batsman and played 24 innings in 16 first-class matches, with one half-century and an average of 13.04. During the war years he moved up the batting order and scored more highly.

Hounsfield died in Richmond, North Yorkshire at the age of 84.
