= Cross Daggers =

Restaurant in Sheffield, South Yorkshire, England

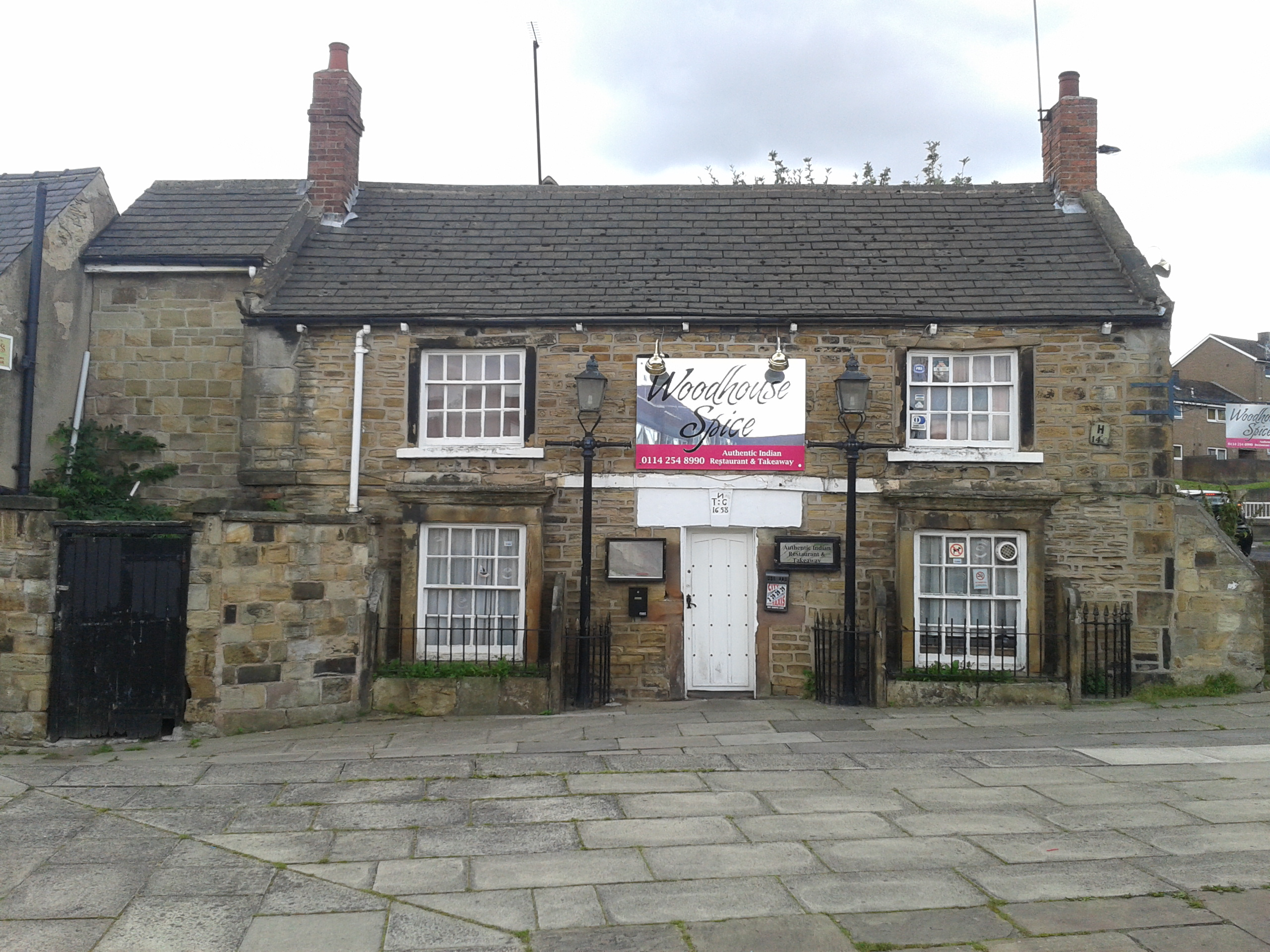
Cross Daggers in 2013

The Cross Daggers is a restaurant and former pub in Woodhouse, Sheffield, England.

The building overlooks the village stocks as well as the cross. Although it has mostly been used as a pub, in more recent years it has been used to house various restaurants.

It is one of 362 listed buildings in South Yorkshire. It is Grade II listed, the lowest and most common listing.

== List of landlords ==
- John and Mary Staniforth (nee Hurt) c. 1830
- Robert Staniforth and Charlotte (née Whitehead) c. 1880s
