= North Staveley Colliery =

Former coal mine in South Yorkshire, England

Coordinates: 53°21′25″N 1°18′44″W

Aston Colliery was a small coal mine sunk on Aston Common, within Rotherham Rural District but six miles east of Sheffield in the 1840s. In 1864 its workings were taken over and developed by the North Staveley Colliery Company, part of the Staveley Coal and Iron Company, based in North Derbyshire. It was later acquired by the Sheffield Coal Company.

== History ==
A small coal mining operation commenced in the 1840s on Aston Common, south of Rotherham and east of the city of Sheffield, between Aston (in South Yorkshire) and Beighton (then in Derbyshire but now part of South Yorkshire).

In 1864 the workings of the Aston colliery were taken over and developed by the North Staveley Colliery Company, who not only extended the coal workings but built housing, a chapel and reading room for its workers. This increased the population of the parish of Aston by 672 between 1861 and 1871, an increase of over 70% (as a commuter town for Sheffield and Rotherham it had over 14,000 inhabitants by 1991).

An industrial tramway connected the mine with the railway line between Sheffield and Worksop.

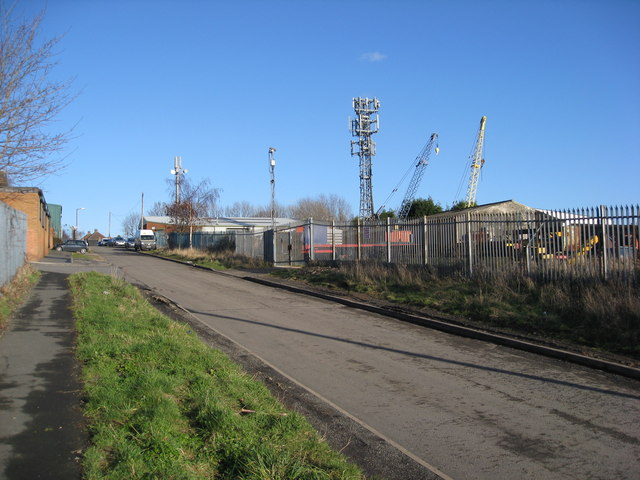
Aston Common Industrial Estate (2009). The colliery was on the right.

Aston Common Industrial Estate now covers the area of the former colliery.
