= Thomas Staniforth & Co =

British tool manufacturer

Coordinates: 53°20′41″N 1°22′22″W

Thomas Staniforth & Co. was a sickle, scythe and tool smiths based in Hackenthorpe, Sheffield, England. The company was founded by Thomas Staniforth in 1743 and operated out of workshops located on Main Street, Hackenthorpe until it was closed during the 1980s and its assets incorporated into Spear & Jackson. The company was known for its Severquick brand of gardening tools.

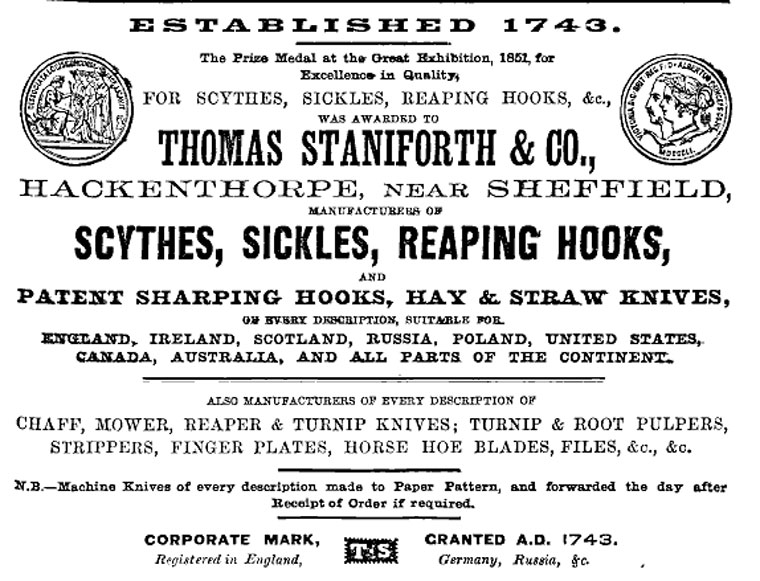
1876 Advertisement

== History ==
During the 17th and 18th centuries, the brooks around Hackenthorpe and the neighboring villages of Eckington, Mosborough, Ridgeway, Ford contained a number of grinding wheels used for the sharpening of Sickles and scythes. In fact there is even documented evidence showing the Staniforth family itself was involved in sickle smithing in the 17th century in Ford. Prior to moving to the Eckington parish, this particular line of Staniforths can be found in the neighbouring parish of Norton. William Staniforth was baptized at St. James on 28 October 1560 to Henry Staniforth (Henrici Stannyforthe), a farmer at The Herdings. William married Elizabeth Thorpe and had several offspring, including a son William, baptised 16 September 1607. William married Elizabeth Hodgson. Elizabeth died giving birth to a son William, baptised at Eckington on 22 February 1640; William would go on to remarry Dorothy Monk, whilst their son was apprenticed to his grandfather, Richard Hodgson at Jordanthorpe. The family then split with the young William Staniforth moving to Hackenthorpe and his half siblings staying in the Eckington area to form other lines of Sickle smithing lines. William had a number of children in Hackenthorpe including Samuel. Thomas Staniforth (1721–1776), the son of Samuel Staniforth operated a number of wheels along the Shire Brook. One notable wheel can still be found in the Shire Brook Valley Local Nature Reserve and is known as the Nether Wheel.

In 1743 Thomas Staniforth along with brothers John (1723–1795) and William (1706–1773) decided to set up a purpose-built workshop on Main Street, Hackenthorpe. Building began in 1740 with the workshops coming into full operation in 1743. Although the family was actively selling tools under their unique makers mark, it wasn't until the 1870s that the name Thomas Staniforth & Co. came into use. The company passed down through the generations, first to Thomas' son Thomas Staniforth II (1756–1808), then to Thomas Staniforth III (1785–1847), then Thomas Staniforth IV (1810–1873) before finally going to Thomas' son William Staniforth (1840–1900). The company successfully had contracts to sell their tools in various countries including Russia, Ireland and other mainlane European countries. The only competition the business faced in the area was the Hutton & Co. works which operated in nearby Ridgeway, Derbyshire.

By the time William Staniforth took control, the tool trade was moving to machine based manufacture rather than hand smithing, and for the first time an outside partner was brought in to run the company. John Hibbard (1846–1923) of a prominent family from Woodhouse, Sheffield was brought in to partner with William. Shortly following this partnership William died in 1900 after gradually losing control of the company.

The Grade II listed Greenside House is located next door to the workshops and was also occupied by the Staniforth family for centuries.

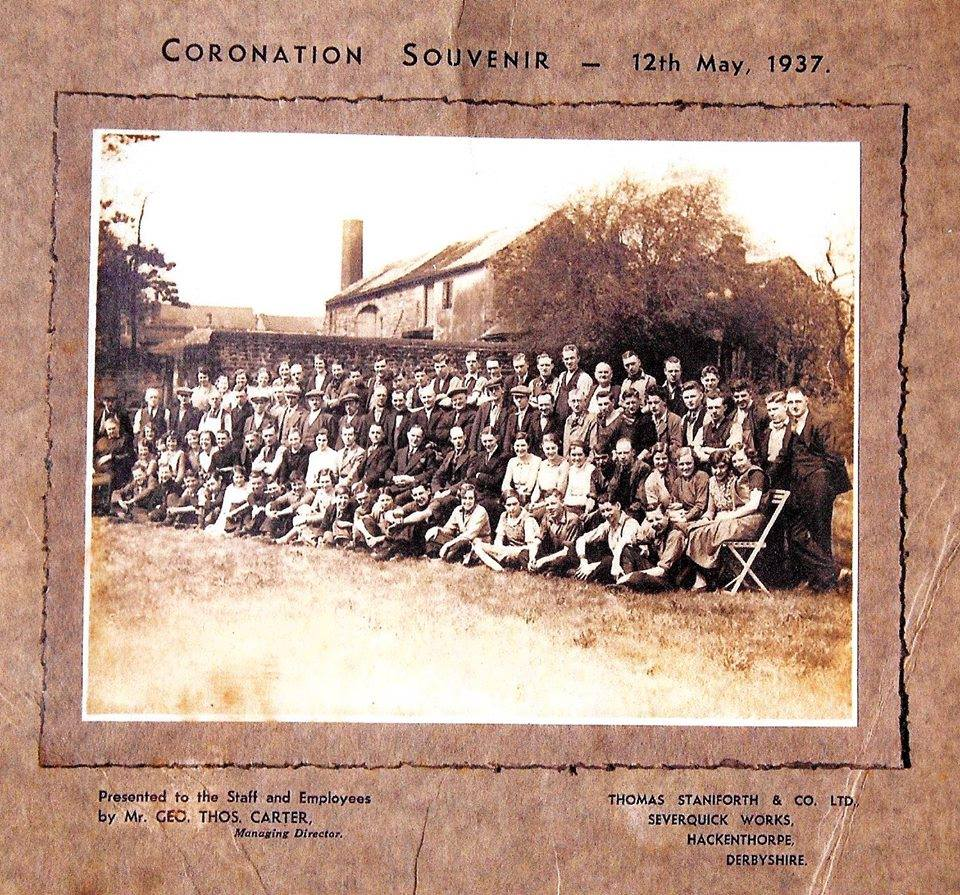
Coronation Souvenir Photo presented to employees 12 May 1937

The company continued to operate well into the 20th century; in 1967 it was taken over by Spearwell Tools, which was eventually transferred to Spear & Jackson in 1972. The Thomas Staniforth & Co. finally closed their workshop in the 1980s.

Today the building still remains and has been converted into small business units, with the smithy pond remaining in the yard.
