= Beighton, South Yorkshire =

Village in South Yorkshire, England

Coordinates: 53.3455506°N 1.3596662°W

Beighton
- Village and Suburb
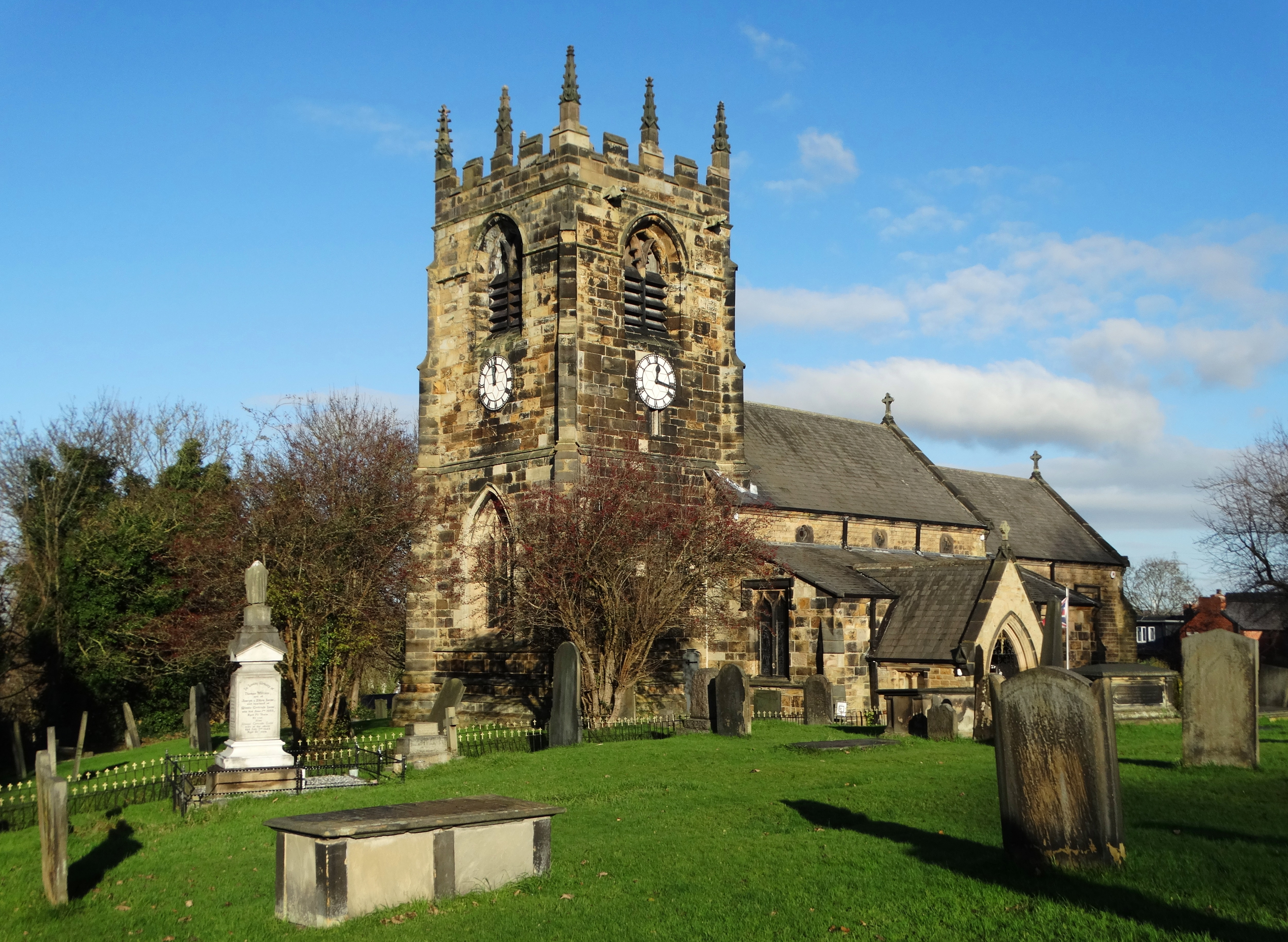
- St Mary the Virgin Church

- Location within South Yorkshire
- OS grid reference: SK408838
- Metropolitan borough: Sheffield
- Metropolitan county: South Yorkshire
- Region: Yorkshire and the Humber
- Country: England
- Sovereign state: United Kingdom
- Post town: SHEFFIELD
- Postcode district: S20
- Police: South Yorkshire
- Fire: South Yorkshire
- Ambulance: Yorkshire
- UK Parliament: Sheffield South East

Beighton is a village located approximately 6½ miles south-east of Sheffield city centre, now classed as a historic township of the city. Following significant expansion, the village became part of Sheffield in 1967 and was transferred from Derbyshire to the newly created county of South Yorkshire, England. From the late 17th to the 19th centuries, Beighton was noted for its edge-tool manufacturing industry, with the Thomas Staniforth & Co. sickle works based nearby at Hackenthorpe. The village is also notable for its ice hockey team, the Beighton Bombers.

The former village has a number of schools, including Beighton Nursery and Infant School and Brook House Junior School.

Today, there has been a lot of development of housing; however, due to its location on the outskirts of Sheffield, it maintains a rural setting alongside villages including Eckington, Mosborough, Ridgeway, and Dronfield.

== History ==
The first mention of the village comes from 9th century Anglo Saxon records of Derbyshire land owners. The village was then known as Bectune. The then hamlet stood on the edges of the 'Great Forest' which stood in the area where the Rother Valley Country Park stands today and extended to areas of Derbyshire, Nottinghamshire, West Yorkshire and Lincolnshire. Today the only remnants of the 'Great Forest' is Sherwood Forest.

The area was settled by the British invaders known as the Angles. The invasions took place at the end of the Romanic period around 500 AD. Prior to these invasions the area was part of the Kingdom of Mercia, the local Shire Brook formed the border with the neighbouring kingdom of Northumbria. Being so close to the border meant the hamlet was prone to invasions.

The Sheffield Museum contains a number of bones and flint tools unearthed in the area during the 19th century, dating back to the Neolithic period, this shows the area was inhabited long before the Angles settled.

The village was noted as having 15 households in the Domesday book in 1086, with the land being owned by Roger the Poitevin. A moated castle was said to be evident in the village, with a reference from the 13th century describing 'the tower of the former castle ' being evident in a field named Castle Mead, however no evidence remains.

The parish church of St. Mary's dates back to c1150. The first documented mention of the church is in an undated deed written during the reign of Edward I (1272–1307).

Prior to the 20th century, farming and smithing were the primary forms of employment, however this shifted towards mining towards the end of the 19th century, with numerous mines being opened in the area, most notably Brookhouse Colliery and Birley Collieries. The Ochre Dyke stream was used to power grinding and water wheels during this time period.

The village was served by Beighton railway station until its closure in 1954.

Due to the villages location close to the River Rother, a number of major flooding events have occurred, notably in 1940, 1954 and 1960.

In 1961 the civil parish had a population of 23,056. On 1 April 1967 the parish was abolished and merged with Sheffield, Eckington, "Aston cum Aughton", Wales and Killamarsh. It is now in the unparished area of Sheffield.

== Sport ==
The village has produced a number of sports teams, notably the Beighton Miners Welfare F.C. which reached the First Round of the FA Cup in 1953. Cricket has also had a major presence in the village, with the Miners' Welfare Cricket Club being formed in 1928 after merging with the nearby Hackenthorpe Cricket Club.

== Present day ==
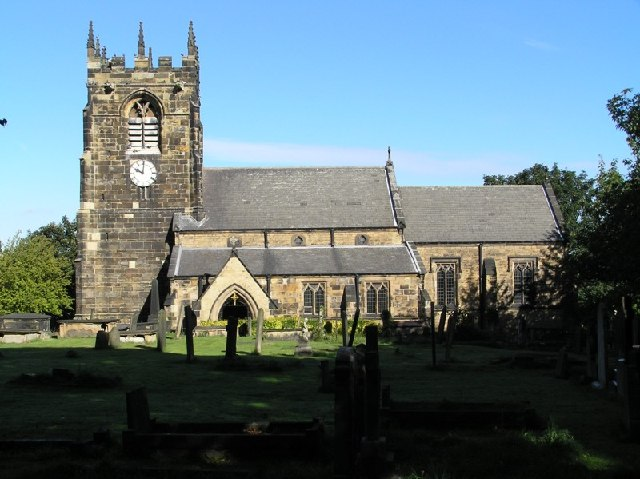
Church of St Mary the Virgin, Beighton

Beighton, along with a number of local villages, became part of Sheffield city in 1967, being officially recognized as Beighton (ward). The Crystal Peaks shopping centre was opened in 1988, which features regular bus routes to Sheffield city centre. Many of the local residents are now employed in Sheffield, Worksop and other large cities.

Rother Valley Country Park was opened in 1983, providing a site for recreational activities. Gulliver's Valley, a theme park was opened to the north of the village in 2020.

Although the village once featured a number of public houses including The Railway Inn, only The Cumberland, Fox Inn and the Miners Welfare remain.
