= Birley Collieries =

Former collieries in South Yorkshire, England

Coordinates: 53.35281°N 1.36655°W

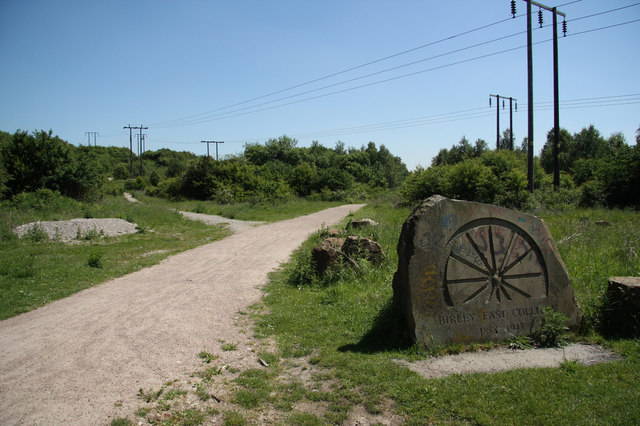
Site of Birley East Colliery

The Birley Collieries were a group of coal mines set in the Shire Brook Valley in south-east Sheffield, South Yorkshire, England. They were connected to the railway system by a branch line from the Manchester, Sheffield and Lincolnshire Railway at Woodhouse East Junction, about 800 yards east of Woodhouse station.

From 1877 to his death in 1926, William Dunn Gainsford was owner of the Birley Collieries, with his cousin Alfred John Gainsford serving as managing director.

== The collieries ==
The Birley collieries were owned by the Sheffield Coal Company who also owned nearby Brookhouse and North Staveley collieries. These collieries stood either side of the M.S.& L.R. line less than a mile to the east of Woodhouse East Junction.

In 1866 the Sheffield Coal Company, which had been founded in 1805, signed an agreement with the Earl Manvers to work below his lands in the Frecheville, Woodhouse and Hackenthorpe area, just outside the then Sheffield boundary. Over the following ten years they sunk and developed Birley West Colliery on a site in the Shirebrook Valley between Woodhouse and Hackenthorpe.

A further 10-year plan followed in which more land was acquired and a new shaft sunk, however, it was not until spring 1887 that work commenced on this new sinking. The following year the part completed colliery gained the name Birley East Colliery. Although a small amount of coal was being cut from the new colliery, brought to the surface at Birley West, it was not until 1890 when a new winding engine was installed that it fully came on stream. Later expansion came with mining rights being obtained from the Duke of Norfolk to mine below Handsworth Common.

== Accidents ==
In 1856 John Walker (aged 16) was killed at Birley Vale a quantity of coal gave way and bruised him but he died before being taken home, he left a widowed mother.

Sheffield Free Press 26 September 1857. Anthony Mycock 61 severely burnt by Fire Damp at Birley Vale Plantation Pit. Died from his injuries 7 October 1857 Buried at Gleadless Christ Church.

On Saturday 19 January 1858 George Drury a large quantity of earth fell on him and killed him on the spot.

In 1863 a young man named Gillott was killed by a fall of bind on Thursday 17 September 1863.

On Thursday 13 September 1866, Thomas Downs (aged 14) of Normanton Spring was killed and two men injured at Planting Pit Birley Vale.

On Tuesday 9 October 1866 William Turner of Bird Field was killed by a fall of bind, he was extricated and removed home but died in two hours leaving a wife and three children.

In 1869 a quantity of coal fell on William Hirst on Thursday 18 February 1869 and killed him on the spot. He was 30 years old and left a widow and three children.

In 1869 Henry Liversage was run over by a loaded cove (wagon) and crushed his right leg.

In 1869 on Saturday 18 September James Ellis aged 12 of Hollinsend was caught by a cove and dragged some considerable distance.

In May 1871 Joseph Pankethman, 38 years of age died following an accident six weeks previously at Birley Vale Colliery.

In August 1872 Samuel Warren a horsekeeper was run over by a "corve" he was removed to Sheffield Infirmary but died later.

On 19 October 1872. Fatal Accident Birley Vale Colliery. On Saturday morning, about ten o'clock, a number of men were engaged removing a pump in the workings of the above colliery. The pump is worked by endless chain communicating with an engine at the top, and owing to some mistake in the signal given to the engineman the machinery was set in motion, and young man named Willis Marples, residing at Gleadless, was caught the chain and drawn through a narrow opening, and instantaneously killed.

In March 1873 at Birley Vale Colliery, William Wheeler (40) an experienced pitman of Handsworth Woodhouse was knocked over by full wagons on the inclined plane and three passed over him, he died in 10 minutes. Inquest jury returned "Accidentally run over by colliery wagons".

On Friday 12 June 1874 Benjamin Hutchinson (36) was killed by a large quantity of earth from the roof fell on him.

In June 1876 six miners were killed in an explosion at the Birley Plantain Colliery. They were Ellis Cooper of Normanton Springs, leaves a widow and five children James Woodward, Ridgeway Moor, single Thomas Marples sen Hollinsend widow and two children, Thomas Marples jun nephew of above Gleadless widow and two children, Edward Saville Birley widow and eight children and Joseph Kelley Hollinsend widow.

The Coroner's jury returned a verdict of manslaughter against the fire-trier — William Clayton — and censured the manager and underviewer for their loose and inefficient management.

In 1876 a miner Jonathan Harrison (50) of Birly when a quantity of "bind" fell on him causing a fracture of the ankle joint, he was taken to Sheffield infirmary.

In 1877 a man named Thomas Oxspring of Normanton Springs when a large quantity of bind fell from the roof severely injuring him He was convey home on a cart accompanied by Dr Le Tall.

In 1877 On Friday 14 December 1877 Thomas Grady a bricklayers labourer was at work on a siding on the railway at Birley Colliery he stepped on the line in front of some loaded trucks and was killed instantly.

In 1879 at Birley colliery on Friday 17 July John Westenage a miner from Normanton Spring was knocked down by empty corves which he had not noticed he died on Saturday 19 July 1879. The coroners inquest was held on 24 July 1879 at the Normanton Springs Hotel Woodhouse.

In May 1880 two accidents at Birley Colliery James Fielding of Woodhouse a Coal getter when a large quantity of coal fell on him. cutting his head and face. At the same time in another shaft the roof fell on Samuel Hobson, he was removed to his home in Intake and it was feared his back was broken.

On Tuesday 25 May 1880 Hans Ward of White Lane was ascending the shaft in the cage and had nearly reached the top when he was sized by a fit and fell out of the cage down the shaft a distance of 110 yards. The force of the fall broke a sump door at the pit bottom . The deceased skull was completely smashed and the backbone broken death being instantaneous. He was about 30 years of age single living with his father.

In December 1880 Joseph Clayton and William Wells jun of Woodhouse were clearing some loose dirt at there place of work when the roof came down It took half an hour before Wells was dug out and conveyed home in a serius state. Clayton was not dug out for an hour and was found to be dead.

On 7 January Rabery Granger (40) was killed at Birley Vale colliery by being crushed between two coal wagons. An inquest was held on 10 January 1881 at the Ball in Intake.

On 13 June 1881 Walter Hurst (14) a driver met his death by being run over by a number of loaded wagons . He was crushed internally and death was instantaneous. His body was removed to his home at Ridgeway.

On 22 April 1882 Thomas Rodgers was killed by 10cwt of coal falling on him and he was dead. The inquest pronounced that he was accidentally killed by a fall of coal at Birley Vale Coalpit.

In September 1883 Joshua Outram of Intake a datalllet or nightman was found leaning over the tool chest and upon lifting him up was found to be dead. He leaves a widow and five children.

On 28 May 1885 Frank Shaw (48) of Hollinsend a miner at Birley West Pit was struck by corves coming down.

In June 1885 at 3am John Glossop of Pond Lane was run over by a corve. He was taken to the infirmary but he got worse and died a 7 pm.

On 31 December 1886 Samuel Sheppard Duraham (19) was killed by a runaway corf the inquest recorded a verdict of "accidental death"

On 5 January 1886 William Radcliffe received serious injuries after falling down in the cage with three others down Moor pit shaft of Birley Colliery he died at home the following day 6 January 1886 The fall was caused by the breaking of rope. Coroner record Accidental death.

In 1886 John William Brown age 19 of 3 the Green Darnal on his first day as a miner the roof fell on him, on being extricated he was found to be dead from a broken back.

On 13 March 1886 Benjamin Marriott (55) was accidentally killed by fall of Bind from the roof of Birley Vale West Pit. Inquest held at the Ball Inn Intake body was identified by William Marriot the deceased son jury returned a verdict of Accidental Death. Buried at Gleadless Christ Church.

On 13 May 1886 at Birley Colliery Frank Parkin (30) of St Johns Road Park. was seriously injured when a large quantity of coal fell on him. He had a broken leg, scalp wound and cut arm. He was in a serious condition.

On Wednesday 11 April 1888 at Birley Colliery Albert Sykes died when a section of roof fell on him he left a widow and two children.

On Tuesday 17 April 1888 John Henry Pearson was struck by a quantity of debris from the roof. His thigh was found to be badly injured. He was taken to the Infirmary in the pit ambulance.

On 12 December 1888 Henry White (48) of Handsworth Woodhouse was killed by a fall of bind Emma White his wife gave evidence that on that about 12 o'clock on Wednesday her husband was brought home dead from the mine where he had worked for 30 years she has two sons also working at the colliery. A verdict of Accidental death was recorded.

On Wednesday 14 March 1889 during an inspection by Mr Jaycock and Mr H Walters (the manager) were in the south pit and a portion of the roof fell on to Mr Walters. He was removed to his home in Woodhouse and was found that the splinter of bone of the leg was broken and several ribs detached.

On Tuesday 5 November 1889 George Lane of Hollinsend was injured on his back and neck by a fall of bind from the roof. He was carried home in the colliery ambulance and attended by the colliery surgeon.

In April 1890 at Birley Colliery, Robert Pearson (15) of Normanton Springs a coke washer. He was missed in the morning and nothing was seen of him until his body was found at 11am in the tank used for cleaning the slack from which coke was made.

On 14 June 1890 William Henry Holmes was killed by a Fall of roof. Whilst working at the face of a heading the roof fell upon him. He was 28 and left a widow and two young children.

In December 1890 at Birley Colliery a young married man named Turner from Mosborough was severely injured.

In June 1891 a boy named George Camden of Woodhouse was overtaken by a run of corves which ran over him breaking one of his ribs and cutting his head and face. He was brought home and attended by Dr Scott.

On 5 July 1892 Alfred Youle (or Toule) age 60 a cutler but working as a Labourer was injured by a fall of dirt and died a day later. Inquest jury returned Accidental Death.

On 5 October 1892 George Torr died in Birley West Pit from a fall of roof and was extricated and taken to the infirmary where he died. Inquest found it was "Accidental Death".

In May 1896 James Newsholme died in Birley Colliery from a fall of seven foot onto a screed. Inquest found it was "Accidental Death".

In October 1896 Joseph Hildon (26) died in Birley Colliery from a fall three tons of coal from the face by a gate. Inquest found it was "Accidental Death".

In 1898 a 16-year-old was crushed to death at Birley East Colliery by a full tub of coal coming of the rails. The boy had been working between 11 and 12 hours at the time of his death. Mr A. H. Stokes who was chief inspector of mines for the Midlands District criticised the use of boys doing overtime in his report.

On 8 July 1899 George Jones (43) of 120 Intake Road died in Birley West Colliery from a fall sixteen tons of coal from roof. Inquest found it was "Accidental Death".

In July 1900 a youth Lewis Osbourne a native of Liverpool who lived at Talbot Street Woodhouse . He was driving his pony along the south plane when the roof fell completely burying him and his horse. When he was got out he was found to be dead.

January 1901 BIRLEY PLANTING COLLIERIES, SHEFFIELD. Six hundred men and boys thrown out work through a flood of water the mine. It not a strike, neither the masters or the men's fault, and are looking for a little public sympathy to keep our wives and family while they are getting the water out. We shall be at work very soon. TOM. SMITH, Secretary.

On 4 February 1901 Daniel Bloy (53) labourer of 120 City Road died in Birley Colliery from being run over by a corf. Inquest found it was "Accidental Death".

In 1904 there was a fire in the engine house at Birley East Colliery which spread to the pit head. There were some 600 or 700 men and boys below and it took 2 hours to safely evacuate them all, using a neighbouring shaft. According to a report in the Tamworth Herald the pit head working were almost entirely destroyed.

In October 1905 Walter Bates age 9, the son of William Bates was playing at the colliery while his father was working. Walter was playing between two wagons and the boys head was caught between two buffers and he was killed instantly.

In December 1905 at Birley Colliery a man names Mark Brocklehurst on Intake was buried by a fall of roof and was dead when extricated. The deceased had been from work for some months on account of ill health and had only just re-commenced.

On Thursday 23 August 1906 William Herberts of Normanton Springs was killed at the "Drift" pit of Birley Colliery. A corf struck one of the props which supported the roof with the result that several tons of dirt fell and buried the deceased. When released he was dead, his neck having been broken. He left a widow and four young children.

On Monday 1 October 1906 at Birley East Colliery Charles William David (17) son of Mr Charles Davis of the Royal Hotel Woodhouse, was killed when engaged in work on the plane at the East pit when he was entangles on a run of corves. He was extracted with difficulty but was found to be dead. The body was removed home.

On Monday 12 May 1908 at Birley East Pit John Angle of Woodhouse sustained several fractured ribs following a fall of roof.

On Wednesday 13 May 1908 John Forrest (29) of Talbot Road Woodhouse. The deceased was having his "snap" when the walls and roof fell in completely burying him. When he was extricated he was alive but died while being removed to the surface. He left a widow and six children.

On Tuesday 27 November 1911 John Thomas Brocklehurst minder of Normanton Springs and James Mosley fitter of Hollinsend were killed at Birley Colliery.but a fall of three tones of bind. An inquest verdict of "Accidental Death" was returned on them both.

On Monday 5 May 1913 George Wesley had his left ankle crushed by a descending cage and suffered a compound fracture. He died from blood poisoning on 30 May 1913 at Sheffield Royal Infirmary. Inquest held 2 June 1913.

On Friday 9 May 1913 at the East Pit of Birley Colliery William Norman of Workhouse Yard Woodhouse was killed and Granville Howton of Calvert Road Woodhouse had both his legs broken thigh and collar bone. A piece of rock weighing several tons fell from the roof completely burying Norman who left a widow and three children. . An inquest verdict was that Norman was "Accidentally Killed".

On 17 November 1913 Harry Mallinson (59) was struck on the head by a piece of rock. He returned to work but then after 21 November took to his bed and died of blood poisoning on 4 December. An Inquest jury returned a verdict of "Death from blood poisoning, caused by and accidental fall of rock in the Birley East Pit"

On Thursday 11 May 1916 a Mr George John Leaning of Back Lane Woodhouse was working on the Parkgate Seam when a fall of roof buried him When extricated he was found to be dead. The inquest returned a verdict of "Accidental Death".

On Thursday 24 August 1917 John Vincent Holroyd a "hanger on" at the Birley East Pit by falling down the shat from the Parkgate to the Silkstone seam, a distance of 30 yards. The inquest returned a verdict of "accidental death".

On 11 October 1922 Earnest Pant (33) of 1ct 8hse Hobson Street Sheffield a road layer was killed at Birley East Pit. The inquest returned a verdict of "Accidental Death".

On 23 February 1924 there was an explosion at Birley East Colliery where 4 people lost their lives and four others were injured. Five were admitted to the Royal hospital these were William Barker of Normanton Springs Earnest Roper of Rainbow Forge Hackenthorpe and Hubert Kennedy 153 City Road Intake, married. Fred Porter 70 Main Road Intake married and Lenard Matram 29 Bagshaw Road Intake. At the inquest it was reported that four died Frederick Porter (70) of Main Road intake. Hubert Kennedy (23) 153 City Road Intake. Ernest Roper (20) 1 Rainbow Forge Hackenthorpe. Herbert Roper (41) father of Earnest Roper also of 1 Rainbow Forge.

On 1 October 1928 David Ellis (53) of 7 Vicar Lane Woodhouse was crushed between a girder and a tub on which he was standing. The inquest returned a verdict of "Accidental Death".

On 12 December 1929 John Lindley (71) was crushed and killed by a roof fall at Birley East Pit while sat waiting for his work mate George Haines to go back for his coat at the end of their night shift.

On 13 December 1934 three miners, Harold Reaney (27) of 12 Main Street Hackenthorpe, Ernest Redfearn (27) of 90 Ellis Street Brinsworth Rotherham and Albert Pearson (33) a coal filler of Lindley Lane Normanton Springs lost their lives at Birley East Colliery when a wet roof collapsed, causing 80 tons of coal to fall on the miners.

On 18 December 1936 Thomas William Linley (31) lost his life at Birley East Colliery.

On 23 October 1943, the final day of coal production before Birley East officially closed, John Prest died when shock waves caused an upper layer of coal to fall and trap him.

== Closure of the collieries ==
Birley West drew its last coal in 1908 and production then concentrated on the East pit.

The last coal was drawn at Birley East on 15 October 1943 but the life of the pit was not quite at an end. In December 1943, Ernest Bevin, the Minister of Labour announced to the House of Commons that a ballot was to be held, from time to time, in which those men whose National Service Registration Certificates ended with the chosen number would be transferred to the mines. This gave rise to the term Bevin Boy. Many colliers had the new trainees alongside the production unit but at Birley they were able to use the recently closed facilities. Accommodation was provided in Nissen huts on Beighton Road, the first occupants arriving in early 1944.

Following the end of the Second World War and the demobilisation of the Bevin Boys, new trainees came, this time men from allied countries in Europe wanting to make their home in England, particularly a large contingent from Poland. Even after the last trainee moved on the end was not quite in sight – a new borehole topped with a pumping house was constructed on the site to help solve the water table problems at Brookhouse. This operated until the closure of Brookhouse Colliery in 1986 when it was finally switched off – the end for Birley had arrived.

== The Birley Branch ==
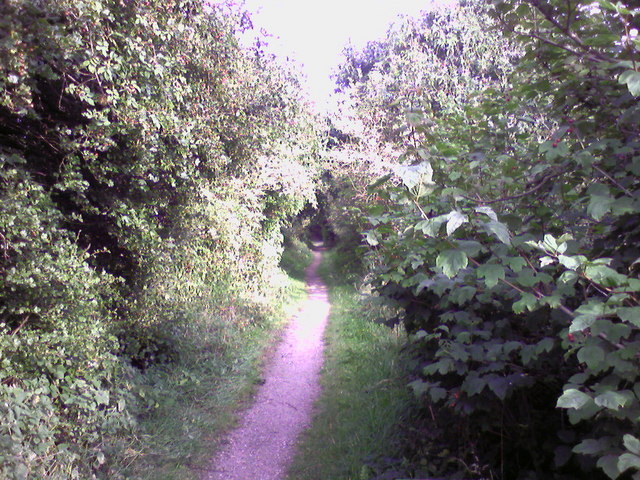
Former route of the Birley colliery branch, now a section of the Transpennine Trail

In 1851 the Manchester, Sheffield and Lincolnshire Railway proposed to construct a series of short branch lines with the objective of increasing the railway's coal carrying. Parliamentary permission for these lines was granted under the M.S.& L.R. (Coal Branches) Act, 1852, but only one of the lines was built, that from Woodhouse East Junction to Birley (West) Colliery.

The Birley Coal Branch was 2.75 miles in length and came into use in June 1855, having been built by Thomas Waring and Company for the sum of £9,989.00. The line was single track and operated under the "one engine in steam" principle. The line was worked by the M.S.& L.R. (later Great Central Railway and London & North Eastern Railway) until 1943 when the colliery company took over operations. It was at this time that the colliery changed from a production unit to a training centre.

== The Birley "Paddy Mail" accident, 1920 ==
This accident took place on the section between Woodhouse and Birley West colliery. The "Paddy Mail" was 'topped and tailed' by colliery locomotives, Birley No.3 at the front and Orient at the rear. The driver on the front locomotive, Mr. A. Brammer, should have been in possession of the single line staff for the section, but he did not have it and the train was involved in a head-on accident with a light locomotive coming in the opposite direction. The two coaches were so badly damaged that they were replaced with a rake, bought second-hand, from the Great Northern Railway.

== "Didn't we have a lovely day....." ==
The Paddy Mails were not the only passenger trains to use the branch. On an annual basis, from the mid-1890s to the outbreak of the First World War, the branch was used by the "Pitmen's Family Outing" – a trip, on which the workers voted for the destination from a selection of seaside resorts. The workers contributed 2d (less than 1p) per week to the 'trip fund'. The trains were run on Saturdays and started as early as 3.00 a.m. from the colliery yard, passengers boarding by ladder into coaches which could only be described as 'basic' – compartment stock with no toilets. The return train, depending on destination, could arrive back well into the early hours of the Sunday morning.

On 15 June 1907, three trains were run, in the working timetable, No.15 from Beighton at 5.00 a.m., No.14 and No.16 from Birley Colliery yard at 4.35 a.m. and 5.10 a.m. to Bridlington and Scarborough. All trains also called at Woodhouse. The trains arrived back just after midnight.

In total these trains were shown as carrying 50 committee members, 2,500 adults and 350 children.

In 1913, the excursion ran to Blackpool with a departure time from the colliery yard around 3.00 a.m. and an arrival back at 5.00 a.m. on the Sunday.

== Locomotives ==
All the locomotives, except those shown, passed to the National Coal Board on nationalisation. The locomotives could be found working at either Birley or Brookhouse collieries as required, although some were allocated specific workings.

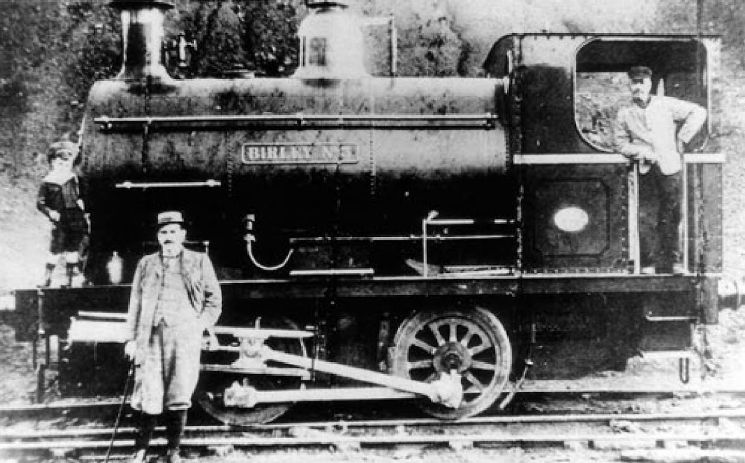
Managing Director Alfred John Gainsford taking delivery of shunting engine No. 972 in 1903

No./Name	Wheel Arr.	Cyls.	Makers	Wks No.	Date Blt.	Notes
Belsize	0-6-0ST	OC	BP	1829	1878	Withdrawn c.1928
Birley No.1	0-4-0ST	OC	MW	787	1881	Sold to J. Aird & Co.
Birley No.2	0-4-0ST	OC	MW			Scrapped c.1911
Orient	0-6-0ST	IC	HC	365	1890	To Brookhouse 1951
Birley No.3	0-4-0ST	OC	P	972	1903	Scrapped c.1940
Birley No.4	0-4-0ST	OC	P	1073	1907	Scrapped 1933
Birley No.5	0-4-0ST	OC	P	1454	1917	Transferred to Maltby
Birley No.6	0-4-0ST	OC	P	1653	1927	Withdrawn & cut up 12.67 – C.F. Booth, Rotherham.
WDG	0-6-0ST	IC	P	1634	1927	William Dun Gainsford. Scrapped 2.67
TRG	0-6-0ST	IC	P	1765	1929	Thomas Robert Gainsford
Victory	0-4-0ST	OC	AB	1654	1920	ex-Thos. W. Ward

Abbreviations: Cylinders:

- IC:Inside Frames
- OC:Outside Frames.

Builders:

- AB:Andrew Barclay & Sons Co.
- HC:Hudswell Clarke & Co
- MW:Manning Wardle & Co.
- P :Peckett & Sons, Bristol

== Further reading and listening ==
- Alan Rowles, Winding Up – the History of Birley East Colliery. Published by the author with assistance from Rotherham Metropolitan Borough Libraries. 1992. ISBN 0903666-61-8
- The Victorians – Cyril and Walter Hare. BBC Radio Sheffield / South Yorkshire Sound Archive.
