= Reginald Hounsfield =

English footballer (1882–1939)

Personal information
- Full name: Reginald Edward Hounsfield
- Date of birth: 14 August 1882
- Place of birth: Sheffield, England
- Date of death: 17 March 1939 (aged 56)
- Position: Winger

Senior career*
Years	Team	Apps	(Gls)
1901–1902	Sheffield		
1903	The Wednesday	2	(0)
1904–1906	Derby County	23	(4)
Total		25	(4)
- * Club domestic league appearances and goals

Reginald Edward Hounsfield (14 August 1882–17 March 1939) was an English footballer and cricketer who played as a winger in the Football League for Derby County and The Wednesday.

== Career ==
Hounsfield was born in 1882 and was educated at Repton School.

He played football at Repton, before joining Sheffield in 1901. He played twice for The Wednesday during the 1903–04 First Division season.

While playing for Rotherham F.C. in the Midland Football League, he was noticed by Derby County when he played against their reserve team. He signed for Derby County in October 1903.

He played 23 times at Derby County over two years before retiring due to ill health in 1906.

He died at the age of 56 after a long illness for six months.

== Personal life ==
Hounsfield was married in 1908 to Ethel Norman at St Matthew's Church in Redhill, Surrey.
