= Hutton & Co =

Hutton & Co. was a sickle, scythe and tool smiths based in Ridgeway, Derbyshire, England. The company was founded by The Hutton family in 1760 and operated out of a number of locations around the village. The most notable workshop was located at High Lane and was known as the Phoenix Works. During the 19th century, much of the grinding was done on the Nether Wheel. The company exported tools around the world, and its main competitors were the nearby Thomas Staniforth & Co.

The business ceased operations in 1988. The company was taken over by Hand Tools of Dronfield. The business then operated as “Sorby Hutton” based in Sheffield, now known as Robert Sorby, named after the first master cutler.
