= Mosborough =

Village in South Yorkshire, England

Coordinates: 53.327°N 1.366°W

- Village
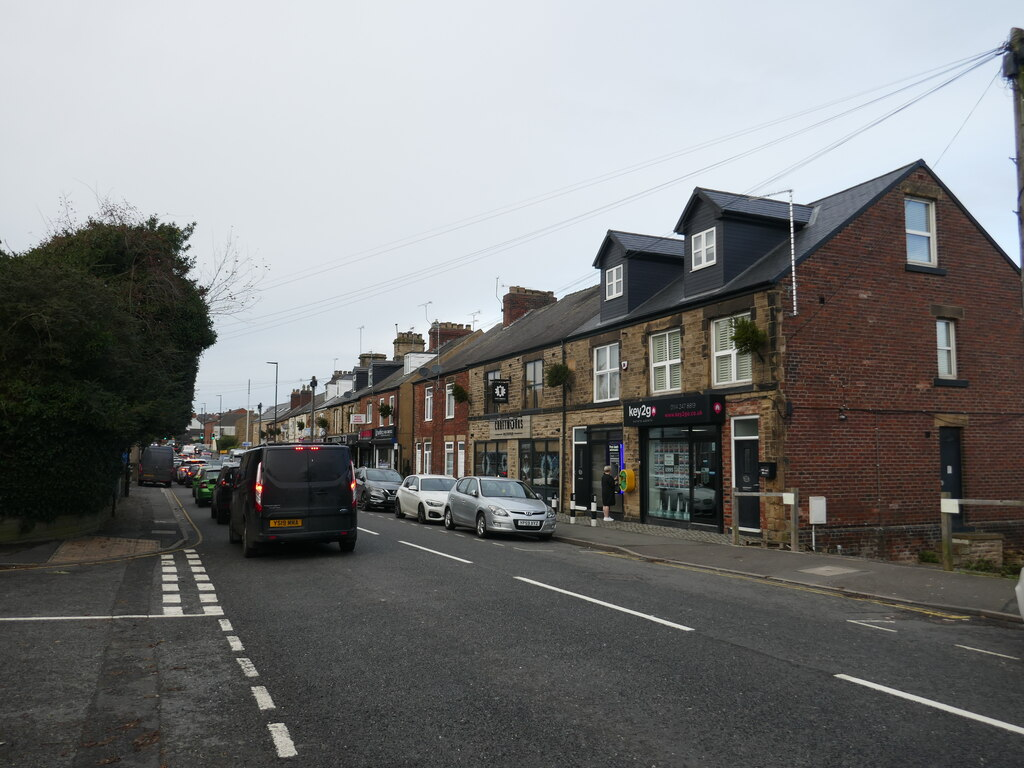
- High Street

- Location within South Yorkshire
- OS grid reference: SK408838
- Metropolitan borough: Sheffield
- Metropolitan county: South Yorkshire
- Region: Yorkshire and the Humber
- Country: England
- Sovereign state: United Kingdom
- Post town: SHEFFIELD
- Postcode district: S20
- Dialling code: 0114
- Police: South Yorkshire
- Fire: South Yorkshire
- Ambulance: Yorkshire
- UK Parliament: Sheffield South East

Mosborough is a village in the city of Sheffield in South Yorkshire, England. Historically part of Derbyshire, its name being a linguistic blend of 'moor' and 'borough'. During the late 19th century and 20th century, the village was noted for its steelmaking, with Hutton & Co. Sickle works being based at nearby Ridgeway. The village expanded due to developments in nearby Owlthorpe, Westfields and Waterthorpe. Mosborough, which was a township at the time, was transferred from Derbyshire to the West Riding of Yorkshire as part of Sheffield.

The village has a number of schools, including the Mosborough Primary School and Westfield School. Today, there has been a lot of development of housing, due to its proximity to the Derbyshire and to the South Yorkshire border.

== History ==
The first mention of the village comes from 9th century Anglo-Saxon records of Derbyshire land owners. The village was then known as Moresburgh, which gradually evolved into Mosburg and later Moresborowe. The then hamlet stood on the edges of the 'Great Forest' which stood in the area where the Rother Valley Country Park stands today and extended to areas of Derbyshire, Nottinghamshire, West Yorkshire and Lincolnshire. Today the only remnants of the 'Great Forest' is Sherwood Forest.

The area was settled by the Angles. The invasions took place at the end of the Romanic period around 500AD. Prior to these invasions the area was part of the Kingdom of Mercia, the local Shire Brook formed the border with the neighbouring kingdom of Northumbria. Being so close to the border meant the hamlet was prone to invasions.

The Sheffield Museum contains a number of bones and flint tools unearthed in the area during the 19th century, dating back to the Neolithic period, this shows the area was inhabited long before the Angles settled.

Mosborough Hall was built during the 17th century, once notably being owned by William Carey, today the building is operated as a hotel, and is Grade-II listed.

In later centuries, the village became part of Eckington parish, with the nearby St Peter and St Paul's Church serving the local area. The Sitwell baronets of nearby Renishaw Hall served as the Lords of the Manor for centuries. From the late 16th century, the area was known for its Sickle and Scythe smithing industry, with Hutton & Co's being founded in 1760, and operating the neatby Phoenix Works. The business existed until 1988, becoming one of the last traditional garden tool smithing works to exist in the United Kingdom. The nearby Thomas Staniforth & Co. at Hackenthorpe also provided employment.

The village has a number of public houses including the British Oak, The George & Dragon, The Alma and the Queen Hotel. A number of pubs have operated in the original village over the years including the Fitzwilliam and the Duke William.

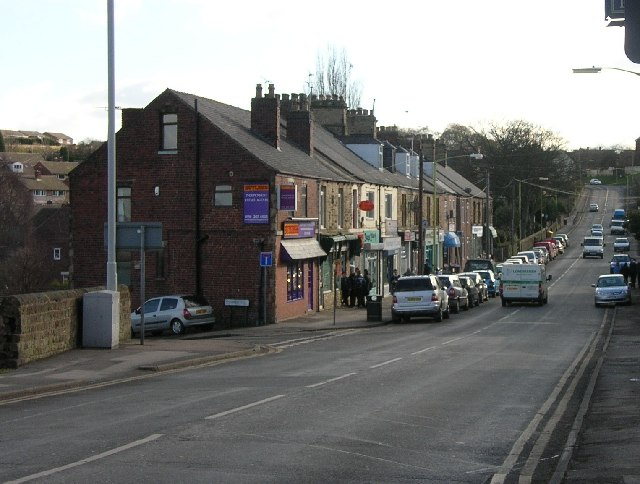
High Street, Mosborough
