= Hackenthorpe Hall =

House in Sheffield, England

Coordinates: 53°20′46″N 1°22′27″W

Hackenthorpe Hall is a 17th-century manor house located in Hackenthorpe, Sheffield, England. The building dates back to 1653, and was built by John and his wife Alice Newbould, and was the historic residence of the Hounsfield family thereafter.

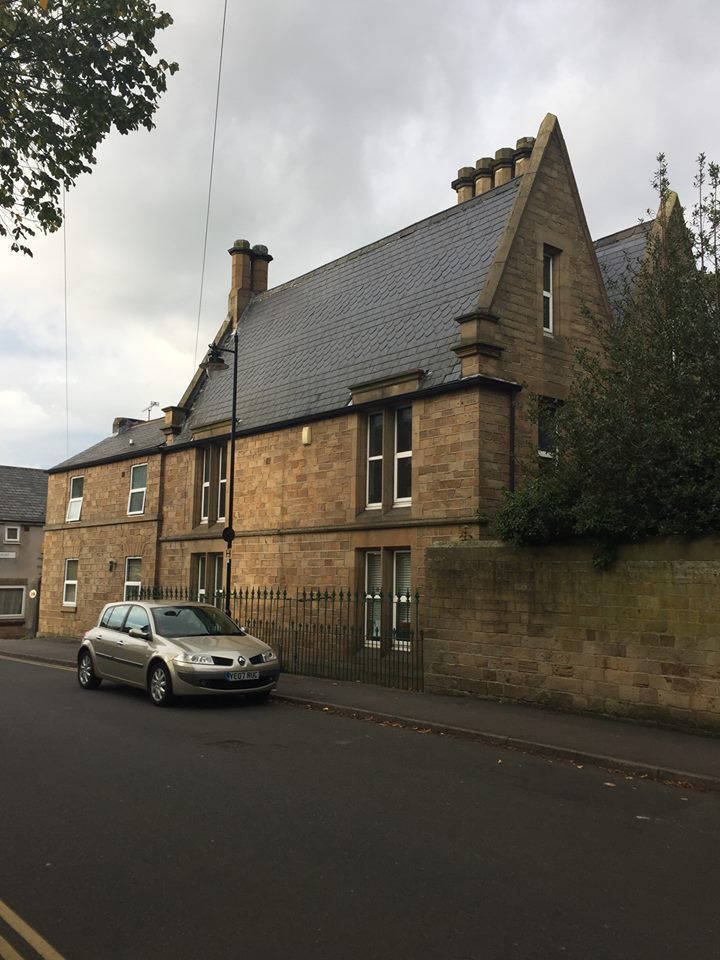
Hackenthorpe Hall

== History ==
The Hall was built in 1653 by John Newbould and his wife Alice, their initials as well as the year is carved in stone above the main entranceway. The Newbold family was present in the village for centuries prior, with Alice's great-granduncles son Michael Newbold emigrating to the United States in the 17th century. In 1875, James Hounsfield restored and extended the building. Upon Hounsfields death in 1902, his son James Jermyn Hounsfield resided in the hall until his death in 1931. Although little remains of the original structure, the datestone above the door was preserved and still remains.

Today the Hall is used as a children's daycare and nursery.
