= Hackenthorpe =

Village in South Yorkshire, England

Coordinates: 53.3435900°N 1.3810500°W

- Suburb
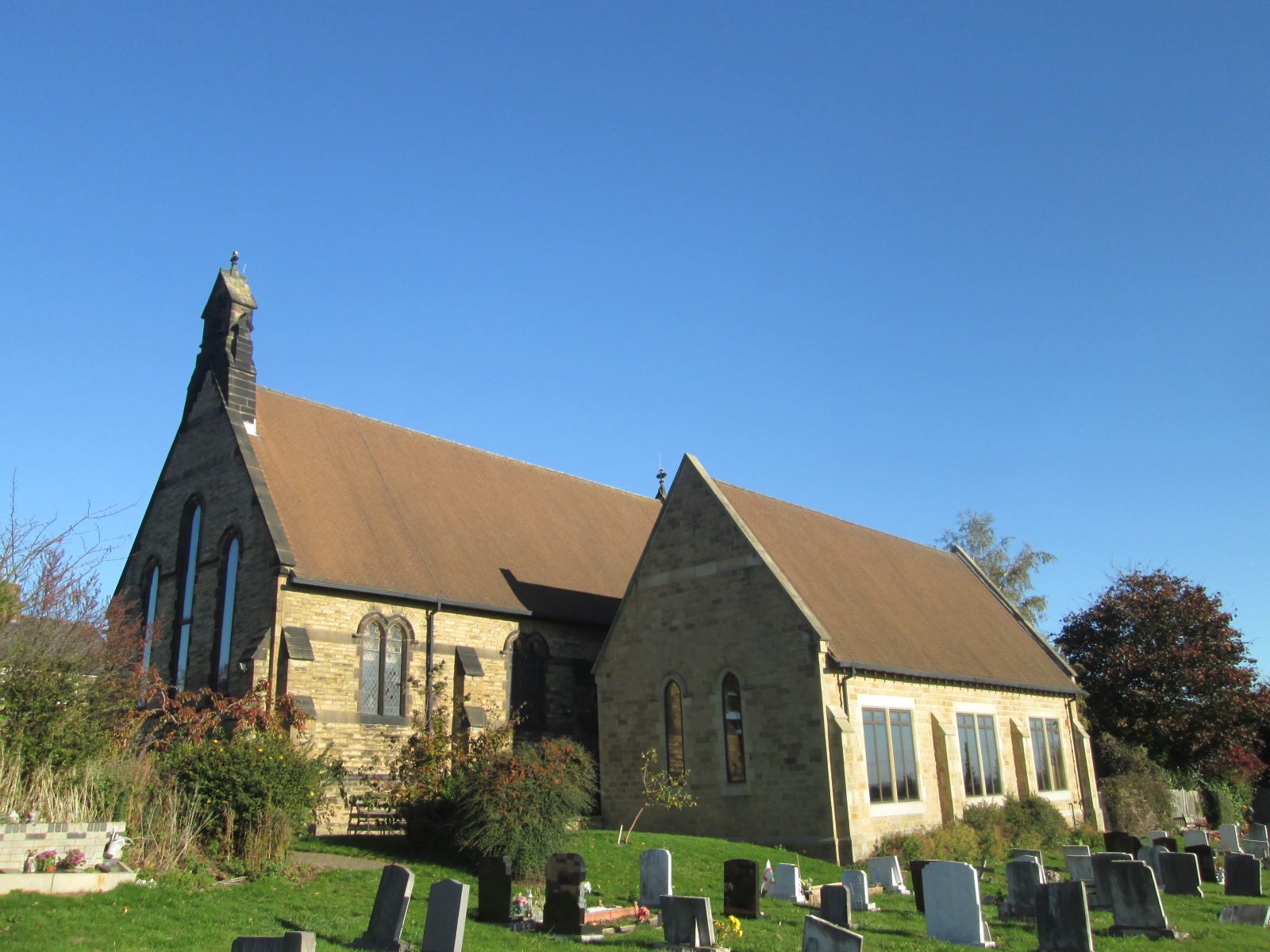
- Christ Church

- Location within South Yorkshire
- OS grid reference: SK408838
- Metropolitan borough: Sheffield
- Metropolitan county: South Yorkshire
- Region: Yorkshire and the Humber
- Country: England
- Sovereign state: United Kingdom
- Post town: SHEFFIELD
- Postcode district: S12
- Police: South Yorkshire
- Fire: South Yorkshire
- Ambulance: Yorkshire
- UK Parliament: Sheffield South East

Hackenthorpe is a suburb and former village, 5 miles (8 km) south-east of Sheffield’s city centre, now classed as a historic township of the city. Due to much expansion, the former village became a part of Sheffield city during the 1950s. During much of the late 19th and 20th centuries the village was noted for its steelmaking, with the Thomas Staniforth & Co Sickle works being based at Main Street. Another prominent feature of the village is the 17th century Hackenthorpe Hall, built by John Newbould for the Hounsfield family, with James Hounsfield being a prominent land owner. The building is today used as a nursery.

The Hackenthorpe Infant School provided education to the local children in the village during the 20th century, this was demolished in 1999 and today local children attend the Rainbow Forge school.

Today the village has seen much development in terms of housing, however the former sickle works, estates and post office still remain in the village and are a reminder of its industrial past. Hackenthorpe tram stop was opened on the South Yorkshire Supertram network in 1995. Hackenthope was once a part of Derbyshire in the parish of Beighton but is now part of South Yorkshire.

== Early history ==
The first mention of the village comes from 9th century Anglo Saxon records of Derbyshire land owners. The village was then known as Eckingthorp, meaning 'The hamlet of Eck's people'. The then hamlet stood on the edges of the 'Great Forest' which stood in the area where the Rother Valley Country Park stands today and extended to areas of Derbyshire, Nottinghamshire, West Yorkshire and Lincolnshire. Today the only remnants of the 'Great Forest' is Sherwood Forest.

Eckingthorp was settled by the British invaders known as the Angles. The invasions took place at the end of the Romanic period around 500AD. Prior to these invasions the area was part of the Kingdom of Mercia, the local Shire Brook formed the border with the neighbouring kingdom of Northumbria. Being so close to the border meant the hamlet was prone to invasions.

The Sheffield Museum contains a number of bones and flint tools unearthed in the area during the 19th century, dating back to the Neolithic period, this shows the area was inhabited long before the Angles settled.

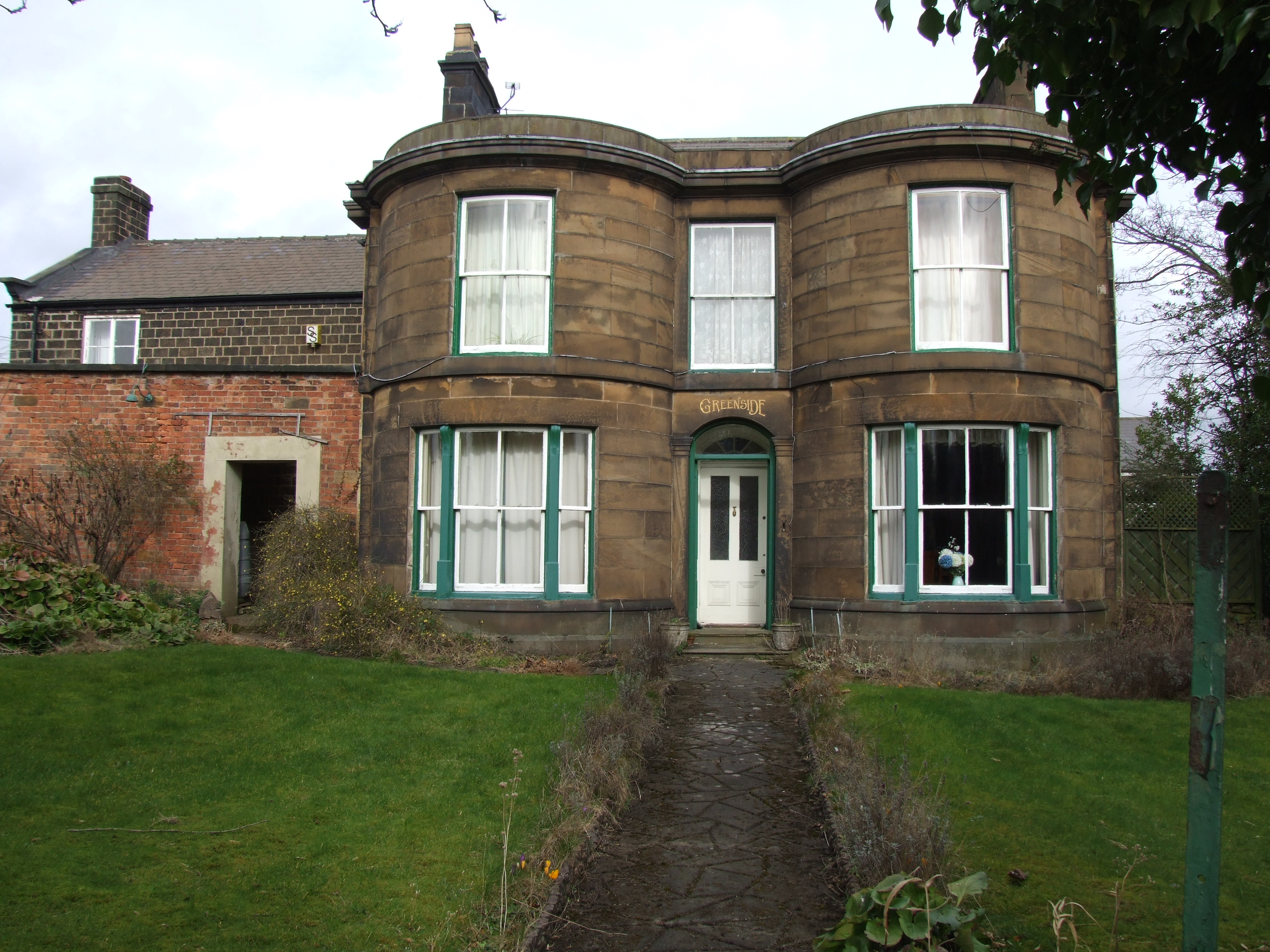
Greenside House, built c. 1825

In later centuries the hamlet consisted of farmlands, with the serfs spending time cultivating plots while also spending time working on the local lordships domains. As well as farming the area was found to be rich in coal and iron ore which provided income to many residents.

In 1653, John and Alice Newbould, wealthy landowners from Woodhouse built the Hackenthorpe Hall on Main Street, a sign of increasing wealth in the hamlet.

By the turn of the 18th century Hackenthorpe began to develop into an industrial site, with coal mines, quarries and mills found throughout the area between Hackenthorpe and Birley.

A remnant of this time period can still be found on Main Street, the Staniforth Works dating from 1743, originally built for scythe making can still be found on the street, complete with the smithy pond in the yard. Some of the old forge dams used for smithing during this time period can also be found throughout the local Shire Brook Valley Local Nature Reserve, most notably Carr Forge.

The 19th century saw significant growth in the area, and the small hamlet was now a village. A chapel was built in 1813 across from Hackenthorpe Hall, this would later be replaced by a new church in 1899 known as Christ church at the end of Sheffield road. In 1820 steam power began to be used by the local scythe makers and by 1840 the Sheffield Coal Company had several mines throughout the area. At this time the Beighton railway station was in use by people entering and exiting the area on the Midland line from Rotherham to Derby. 1855 saw the opening of the National school in the Beighton parish which served the area until 1880, when Lord Manvers allowed for a second school to be built serving the Hackenthorpe village.

By 1877 the first of the Birley Collieries was opened, and saw a daily output of 500 tons of coal. Throughout the remainder of the 19th and 20th centuries the collieries were a large source of employment for residents of the village.

== 20th century ==
With coal mining playing a large role on the village, the colliery owners began building terraced housing for local workers. It was around this time that development began on the Frecheville estates, which had until this time been known as Birley Moor, a mostly rural region. Following the Second World War, housing was in short supply in Sheffield and the land between the city and Hackenthorpe saw prolific development causing the village to be incorporated into the city limits on 1 April 1967. This also saw the village leave the county of Derbyshire for Yorkshire.

Development continued into the 1970s, with the areas around Mosborough village being developed and incorporated into the city. By this stage the coal mining industry had ceased, with the closure of the Birley Collieries the area saw a drastic change.

== 21st century ==
Today the village is a shadow of its former self, with many of the old terraced housing demolished and replaced with modern housing. The Staniforth Works remain, now used to house small businesses, as a reminder of the villages industrial past. The Hackenthorpe Hall can still be found on Main Street and is now used as a nursery. Other older buildings include the post office, and the blacksmiths now used as a veterinary office.

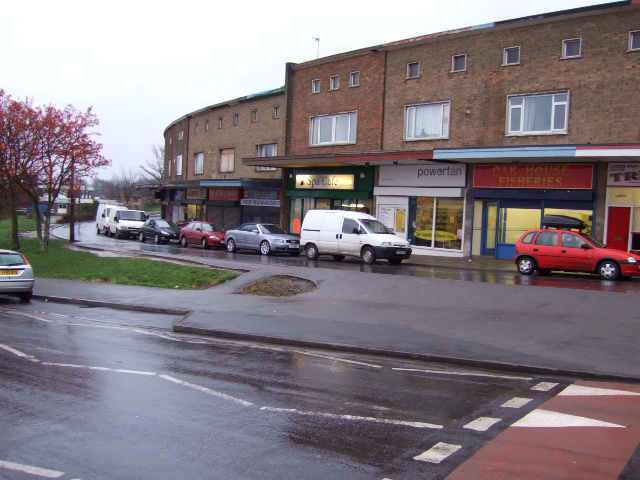
Modern Hackenthorpe shops, 2007

Development has been focused along the Birley Moor region, with a shopping district now found at the junction between Main Street and Birley Spa Lane, new housing estates were also built in this area with much of the rural farmland now gone.

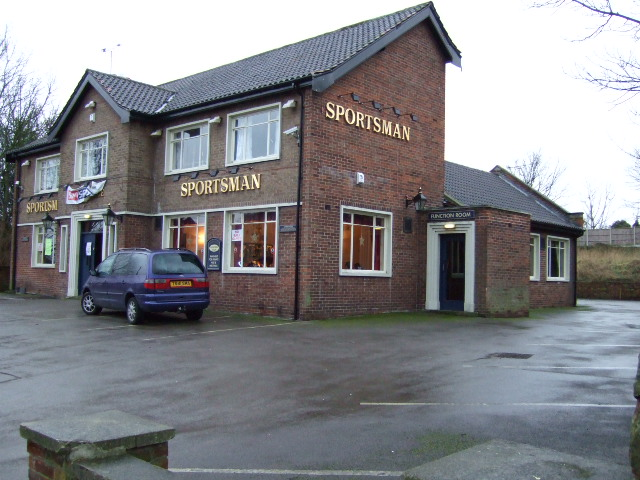
The Sportsman Inn

== Name origin ==
As is the case with a number of towns and settlements in the British Isles, Hackenthorpe gets its name from the Old Norse, meaning 'Hachen's outlying farmstead'. For many years the village was simply split between the parishes of Beighton and Birley, however during the 14th century the modern spelling of Hackenthorpe emerged when local dialects began to have an influence on placenames.
