= Shire Brook Valley Local Nature Reserve =

Nature Reserve in Sheffield, South Yorkshire, England

Coordinates: 53.353°N 1.370°W

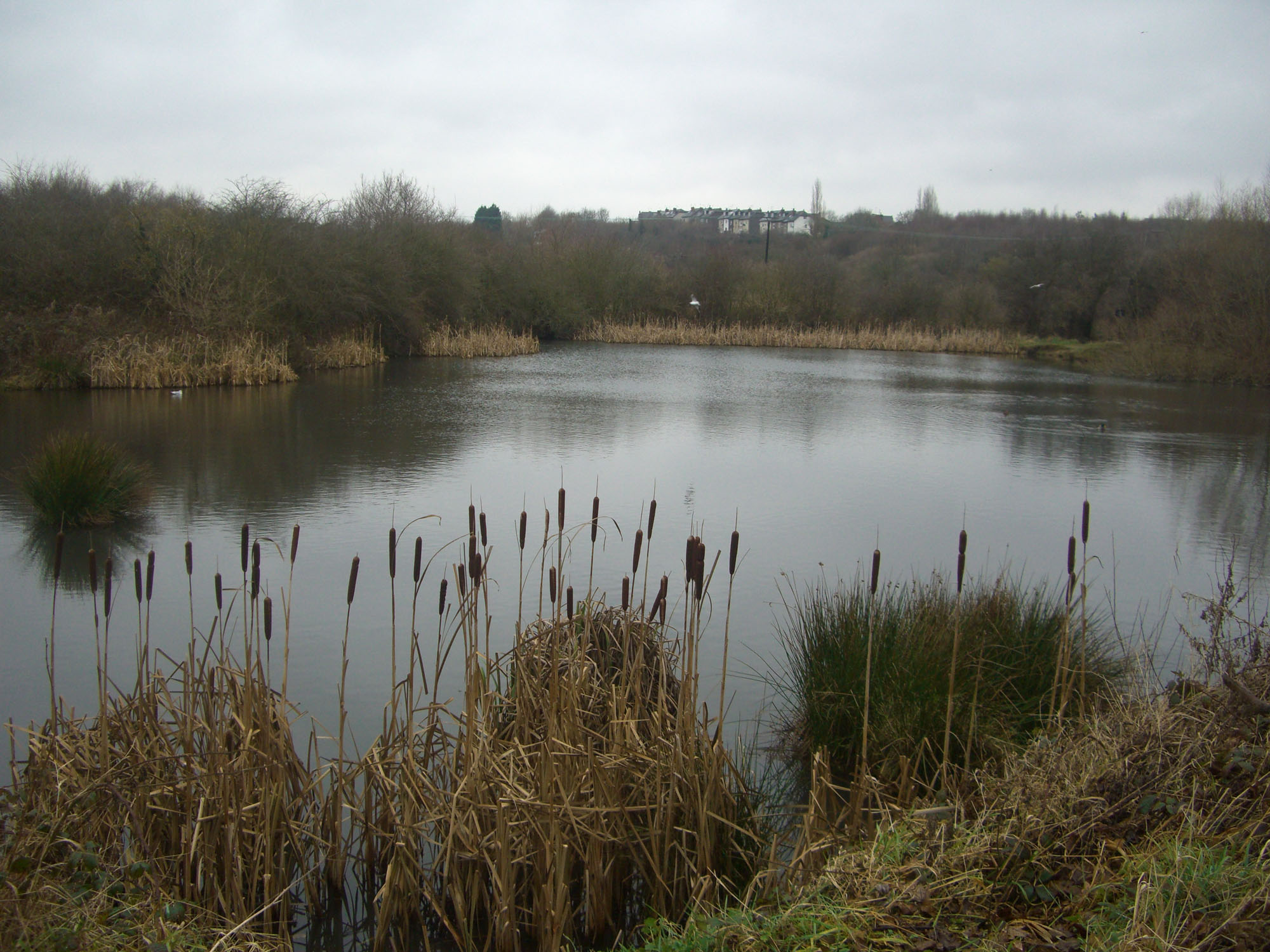
Carr Forge Dam with housing of Woodhouse area in the background

The Shire Brook Valley Local Nature Reserve is located in Sheffield, England, on a former brownfield industrial site.

== Development ==
The Local Nature Reserve was designated in 1999 and extends over an area of approximately 100 hectares.

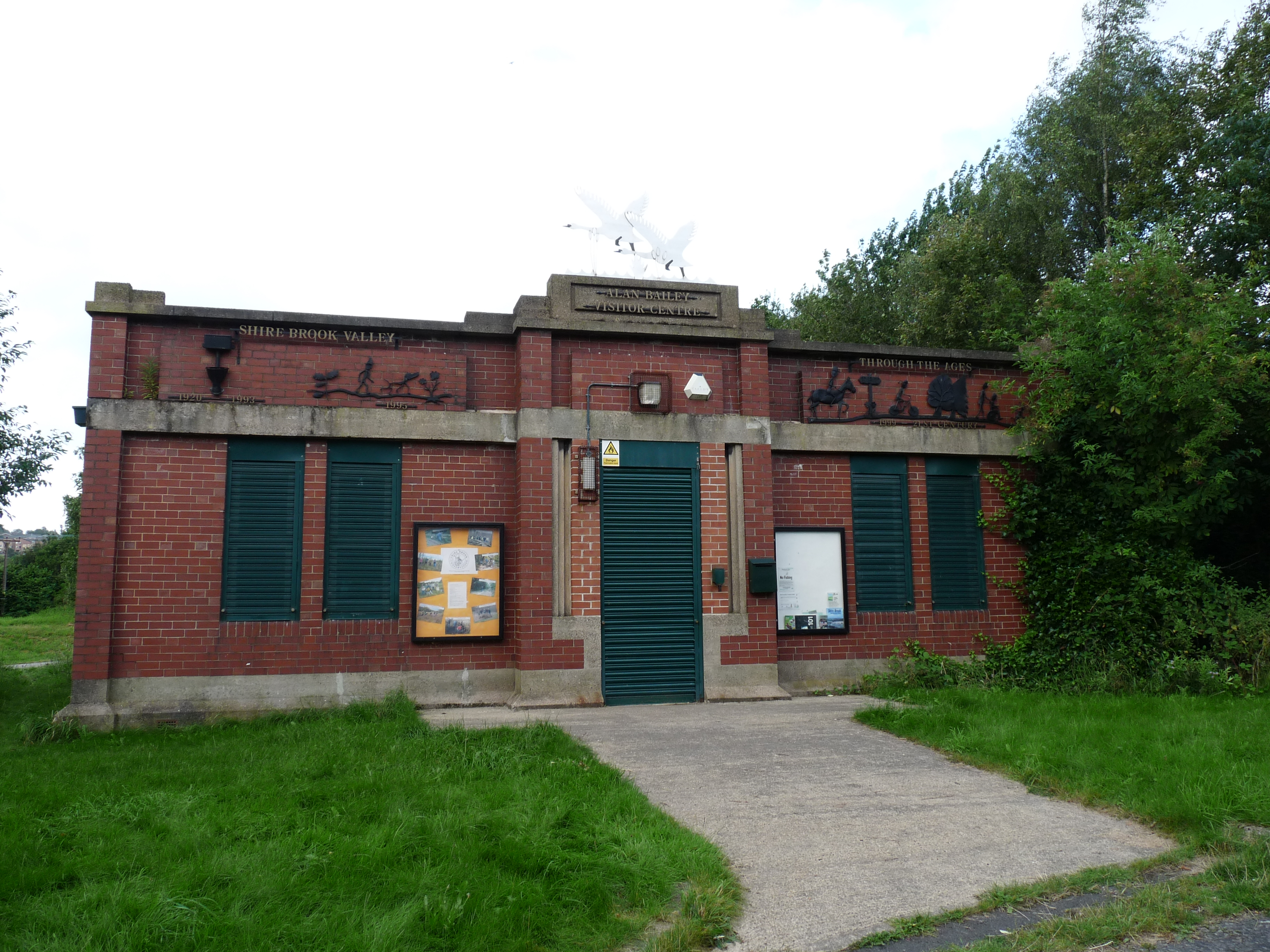
Visitors' centre

It is based around the former site of the Coisley Hill Sewage Works which closed in the early 1990s. The manager's office has been converted into a visitors' centre. The reserve includes Beighton Marsh, an area of reed-grass swamp situated at its eastern end, which supports birds such as reed bunting, grasshopper warbler and barn owl, as well as mammals such as the harvest mouse and water vole. The Birley Spa Bath House, a Grade II listed building, was restored with a Heritage Lottery Fund grant in 2001. Also within the reserve is Wickfield Plantation, one of the few remaining areas of lowland heath and coppiced oak woodland inside Sheffield.

The reserve contains Carr Forge Dam which is fed by a stream from Birley Spa and is a location for wildlife. New ponds were created in the same area to mark the centenary of the City of Sheffield. The Centenary Ponds were opened by Clive Betts on 18 June 1993. Further ponds were created in 2016 to encourage amphibians. Also added to the eastern side of the reserve is a landscaped former landfill site, called Linley Bank Meadow, now home to skylarks and a likely location for soaring buzzards.

The reserve is popular with cyclists and walkers, having a network of paths and the Transpennine Trail running through is used by a running club, for orienteering events, geocaching, company team-building days, school visits etc. The reserve has a car-park accessed from Stone Lane.

Fishing is banned on the site as most access points involve walking under pylons which has resulted in fishing rods conducting electricity and burning anglers. After one bad accident in 2004, the council took the unusual step of removing all the fish from the site to deter anglers. This decision was criticised by the Countryside Alliance.

== Carr Forge Dam ==
Carr Forge Dam is a dam located in the centre of the reserve. The dam dates back to the Tudor dynasty, and most of the brickwork still remains. The dam is now mainly used as a wildlife pond, with toads, frogs and other species including the endangered Great Crested Newt breeding in the marshes.

== Shirebrook Heritage Group ==
The Shirebrook Heritage Group was established in 1999 to maintain the Valley and its visitor's centre. They run a Park Ranger programme and hold regular meetings within the Birley Spa bath house and the visitor's centre itself.

== Shire Brook Valley Conservation Group ==
Volunteers formed the group in 1989 and have been at the forefront in carrying out habitat conservation work on the nature reserve on a weekly/monthly basis, meeting on Wednesday and Saturday mornings.

== See also ==
- Shire Brook
- Nether Wheel
