= Woodhouse, South Yorkshire =

Electoral ward in the City of Sheffield, England

Coordinates: 53.358°N 1.373°W

Woodhouse
- Shown within Sheffield
- Area: 2.7 sq mi (7.0 km^{2})
- Population: 17,450 (2011)
  - Density: 6,463/sq mi (2,495/km^{2})
- Metropolitan borough: City of Sheffield
- Metropolitan county: South Yorkshire
- Region: Yorkshire and the Humber
- Country: England
- Sovereign state: United Kingdom
- UK Parliament: Sheffield South East
- Councillors: Mick Rooney (Labour Party); Alison Norris (Labour Party); Nathaniel Menday (Independent)

Woodhouse ward—which includes the district of Woodhouse and most of Handsworth—is one of the 28 electoral wards in the City of Sheffield, England. It is located in the southeastern part of the city and covers an area of 2.7 square miles (7.0 km^{2}). The population of this ward in 2011 was 17,450 people in 7,764 households. It is one of the wards that make up the Sheffield South East constituency (formerly Sheffield Attercliffe constituency).

== Districts of Woodhouse ward ==
=== Woodhouse ===
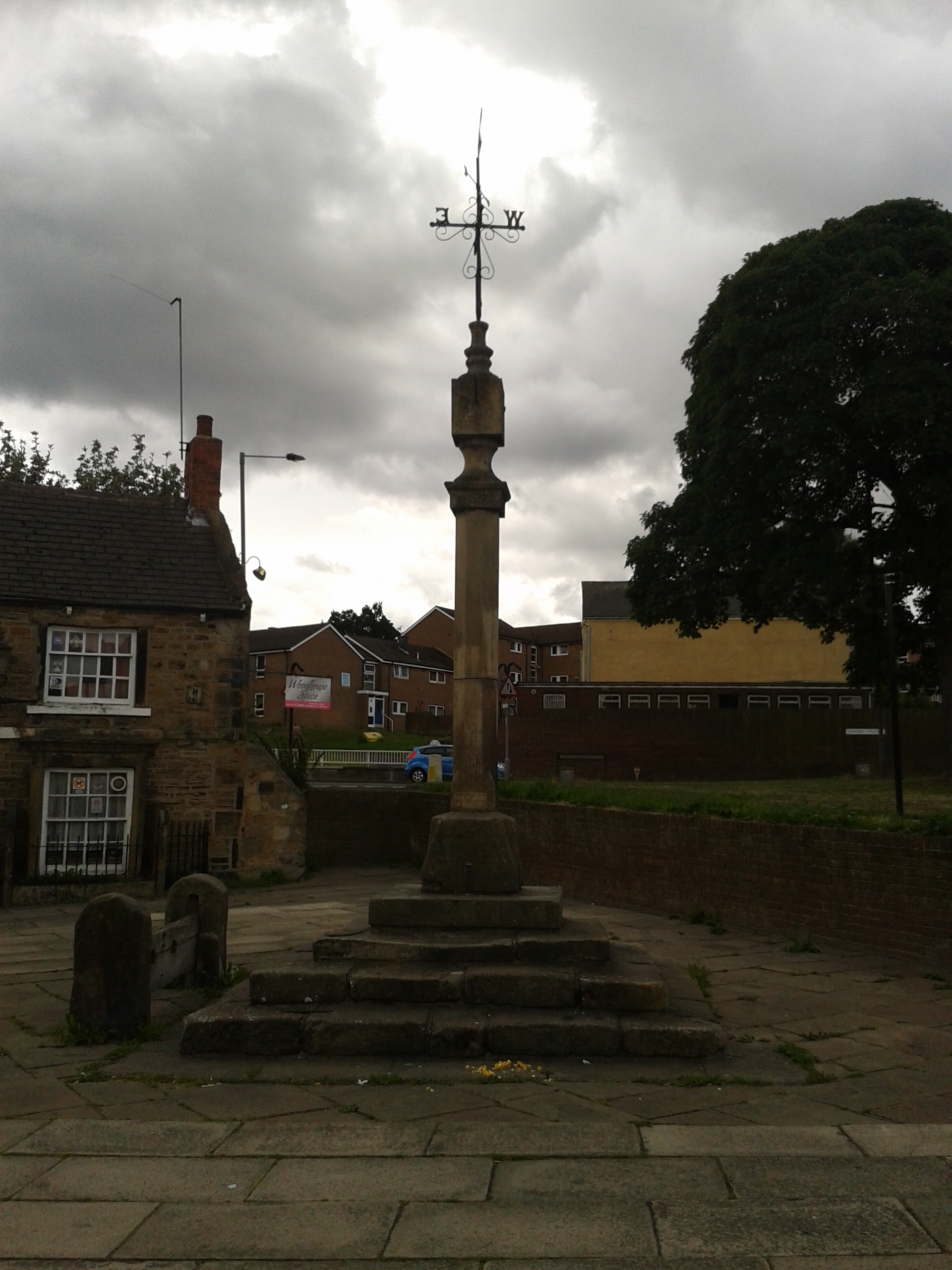
Woodhouse Village Cross, in the market place

Woodhouse (grid reference SK420849) is a former farming and coal-mining village, now a suburb and housing estate in the south-east of Sheffield. It is served by regular buses to Sheffield and has a station on the Sheffield–Lincoln railway line.

The 17th century former Cross Daggers public house, the base of the village market cross and the stocks can be seen in the centre of the suburb. Many other old cottages, including a wattle and daub house dating from the fifteenth century, were demolished in the 1960s as part of a major redevelopment. An old Quaker Meetinghouse dating to the 17th century was converted into private residences in the 1980s. Cinder Hill, a former Quaker burial ground is situated between Woodhouse and Handsworth. George Fox was recorded as visiting a gathering at the site.

Woodhouse is home to the Woodhouse Prize Band, a brass band founded in 1853.

==== History ====
Woodhouse today bears little resemblance to its humble beginnings. This farming village was, until the advent of coal mining in the area, relatively free of any kind of modern post-industrial revolution influence. The population was invariably engaged in either small-scale farming or farming related sub-industries such as early retail and tanning. Most of the architecture associated with this era has been lost but a few reminders survive. Manor Farm Cottage, at the heart of the village, is a sympathetically restored old building and a reminder of Woodhouse's long-lost past.

Sir Richard Barley of Woodhouse c. 1455–1490 is buried in Dronfield church. His tomb shows him in Yorkist armour of the period.

The advent of coal mining attracted an influx of young men and families wishing to capitalise on the various local mining ventures. Woodhouse grew quickly into a mining community with the opening of a number of mines within commuting distance. The village expanded considerably to accommodate the pit workers. Spa Lane, Back Lane and Sheffield Road quickly wound a new and expansive network of pit houses, ensuring that Woodhouse would become a 'pit village'.

A detailed history of the life of Woodhouse in 1912 and 1966 is available from Sheffield University library.

==== Sport ====
Woodhouse F.C. and Woodhouse Britannia F.C. represented the village in the FA Cup during the 1910s and 1920s.

=== Woodhouse Mill ===
Woodhouse Mill is generally accepted as the area, within the City of Sheffield, to the east of the former Great Central railway line. This was a farming area on which housing was developed over a period in the 20th century. The Shirtcliff Brook runs through the area but to avoid recurring flooding this has now been culverted.

== Woodhouse Washlands Nature Reserve ==
The Woodhouse Washlands Nature Reserve, managed by the Wildlife Trust for Sheffield and Rotherham is situated in Woodhouse Mill and boasts several species of fish, birds and other wetland creatures. The River Rother runs through the wetlands.

=== Badger Road ===
The Badger estate was built in the 1960s as a solution to the severe housing shortage. The houses were supposed to be temporary but, after 50 years, they remain. The estate includes Badger Road, Badger Close, Badger Drive, Badger Place, Goathland Drive, Goathland Place and Station Road.
