= The Moss =

Coordinates: 53.317°N 1.381°W

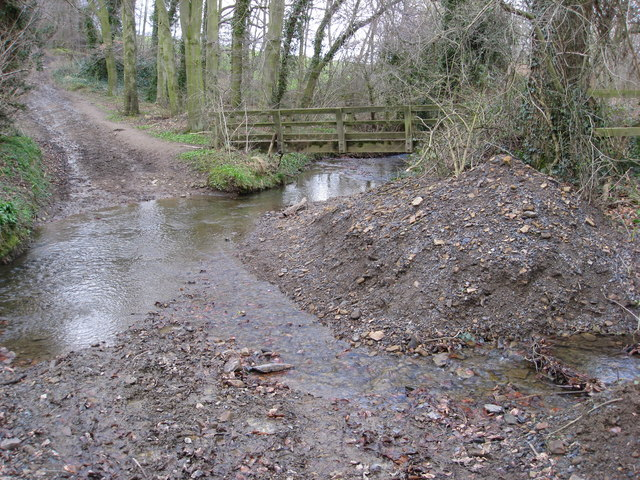
- The Moss, just to the north of Troway.

Location
- Country: England

Physical characteristics
- Source
  - location: Coalpit Wood, Coal Aston, Derbyshire
  - elevation: 518 feet (158 m)
- Mouth
  - location: River Rother at Eckington
- Length: 4.8 mi (7.7 km)

The Moss is a brook in North East Derbyshire, England.

When Rother Valley Country Park was built in the 1980s, constructors used water from The Moss to fill the lakes.

== Name ==
The name of the river derives from Moss Beck, which means 'stream through marshy ground'.

== Course ==
The river flows through the Moss Valley and through the villages of Geerlane, Birley Hay, Ford and Eckington. It passes through several areas of woodland, including Coalpit Wood, Long Wood and Eckington Park. The main tributaries of The Moss are the Robin Brook, the Owler Car Brook, Sickle Brook, Troway Brook, Sloadlane Brook, and Ridgeway Brook.

The source of the Moss can be found just to the east of Jordanthorpe Parkway (B6057 road). The source is a natural spring which lies in an area of woodland called Coalpit Wood. The stream flows broadly eastwards, and is joined by several other streams, all rising from springs within woodland. Owler Car Brook flows to the north west through Whinacre Wood, Cook Spring Wood and Owler Car Wood to join the south bank, and soon afterwards, a larger stream flowing southwards from Lightwood through Newfield Spring Wood joins on the north bank. Sickle Brook rises to the west of Troway and flows through Mires Spring Wood and Brownstorth Wood to join on the south bank. Below the junction, where there is a ford across the river, the surrounding land is less wooded, although there are patches of trees. Another tributary rises from springs in Charnock Hall, and flows southwards through Charnock Wood, Carterhall Wood and Ryall's Wood to reach the north bank, and Troway Brook rises to the east of Troway and flows northwards. As the river passes Geer Lane Farm, there are a number of ponds on the northern bank.

As it approaches the hamlet of Birley Hay, which is considerably smaller than it was in 1886, the river powered a scythe manufactory. Below the outlet weir is a small grade II listed 18th century cottage which was associated with the manufactory and a warehouse which also dates from the late 18th century. The millpond and part of the water-powered forge still exist, but are not listed structures. Soon afterwards, a small river flows northwards to join the south bank. It contains two large mill ponds, which powered the Skelper Forge and Wheel. A bridge carries Geer Lane over the river to join Ford Lane, which then crosses back over the river and the Robin Brook at the hamlet of Ford. Robin Brook flows southwards from Base Green, and joins the north bank of The Moss just below the bridge. Another mill pond lies just to the north of the river, whereas most of the previous ones have dammed the main channel. If formerly powered Ford Wheel. There is another mill pond to the south of the river, which was filled by a stream rising at Bramley and flowing northwards. It once powered Sough Wheel.

Neverfear Dam, a little further downstream is, like the Ford dam, on the north side of the main channel, which flowed over a weir to continue on its way. The dam, a term used locally to describe the body of water, rather than the structure that creates it, powered Neverfear Wheel. Next the river reaches the site of Field's Wheel, where there are three weirs, but little remains of the dam. Beyond it, the river was once crossed by a tramway, which ran along the south bank from a shaft, and then turned abruptly north to ascend up a long inclined plane to buildings at the top of the slope. It had been removed by 1898, and sometime between 1923 and 1937, Footrail dam was constructed at the site of the crossing. The body of water stretched back almost to the weirs at Field's Wheel, but by 1967 it had been reduced to a small pond to the north of the main channel. Carlton Wheel Dam supplied Carlton Wheel, which was another inline pond with a weir at the outlet. Lady Ida's Drive crosses just below where the weir was, and to the south of the river is the site of Plumbley Colliery, a scheduled monument because it is a good example of a late 19th century coal mine. The remains include the Seldom Seen engine house, a Guibal fan house, the remains of coking ovens, and a conical spoil heap. It was operational between 1875 and 1914.

As the river approaches Eckington, there is another weir by Gasworks Lane Bridge, which formerly supplied Park Mill, a flour mill which was no longer marked as such by 1967. Eckington gas works was located on the south bank of the river, which then passes under the A6135 Sheffield Road and the B6053 Rotherham Road. There was once a sluice by the first bridge, which fed a saw mill by the second, but the building had been demolished by 1923. The river passes along the northern edge of the Rotherside Road Business Park and joins the west bank of the River Rother, which flows to the north at this point. At the southern edge of the business park, Eckington Mine was a drift mine where coal continued to be extracted until it unexpectedly closed in 2019. The site has since been made safe by the Coal Authority.

The river forms the ancient southern boundary of the manor of Mosborough, between its confluence with the River Rother and the point upstream of the Never Fear dam, where the Ridgeway Brook joins from the north. It then follows that stream for much of its length.

== Moss Valley ==
Moss Valley is the name of the valley carved out by The Moss, located in North East Derbyshire, just south of Sheffield, England. Nearby settlements include Charnock, Troway, Eckington, Mosborough, and Ridgeway.

Moss Valley is home to the Eckington Woods and Bluebell Woods, the latter being a local term coined because of the quantity of bluebells which cover the woods in the springtime.

The valley, which is formed by The Moss and its tributaries, covers an area of about 10 square kilometres (3.9 mi^{2}).

=== Industry ===
Moss Valley, due to its location next to a river near several coal seams and rock outcrops, has seen much industry over its history.

Moss Valley has a long history of quarrying and mining. The quarries and mines are now closed, including the coal mine near to where The Moss flows into the River Rother. Eckington Coal Mine was a drift mine opened in 1993 by Moorside Mining Co., but subsequently owned by others, which closed suddenly in 2019. There are also several mills in the valley, which was known as a centre for the production of scythes and sickles. In several locations, The Moss has been dammed to create reservoirs and mill ponds.

Foxholes Wheel was located above the confluence with the stream from Charnock Hall. Part of the mill pond called Gill Bridge WHeel Dam was shown on a map dating from 1773, but the map did not include the area where any buildings would have been. The enclosure map of 1796 showed a small building, but no mill pond, while a document from that time referred to it as Woollin Wheel. Little else is known, and evidence on the ground is sparse.

There was a corn mill at Birley Hay in the early 16th century, but a cutler's wheel was erected a little before 1599. The millpond was formed by a dam across the valley, which was called Fortitude Dam on a map dating from 1796. The wheel was owned by William and John Mullins at that time, and there were ten grinding troughs. The operation was expanded in 1836, when a forge was constructed, and a second water wheel was added to allow it to be worked independently of the grinding wheels. A range of nearby buildings were associated with the scythe manufactory, which had been bought by Thomas Hutton in 1836. The Hutton family were associated with the site for over one hundred years, as scythes were made there until the 1930s, by T & G Hutton and & Company. Because of the age of the building, maintenance costs rose, and Huttons intended to move production to their steam-powered Phoenix Works at Ridgeway in 1939, but the move was brought forwards to 1938 when the main shaft of the waterwheel broke. The works was sold to the Sitwell estate in 1940, who wanted to use the mill pond as a fish pond. The works lay empty, and in 1944 the machinery was dismantled as part of the war effort, but the ironwork remained on site until 1946. The forge and smithies deteriorated, and were demolished when the fishing lake was sold to new owners. The wheelhouse and the warehouse remain as do the millponds, dams and watercourses, but are on private property, although they can be seen from a nearby public footpath.

Skelper forge and wheel were located on a tributary, on which there were two mill ponds. They appear to have been constructed after 1796, as they do not appear on the enclosure map of that year, but before 1809, since one of the dams failed in January 1809. By 1877, there were no buildings near the upper pond, but there was a building at the north end of the lower pond. It was marked as Old Skelper Wheel, which was shown as disused by 1898, but was not marked as disused subsequently.

Thomas Hutton's brother Joseph owned Ford Wheel in 1796, although he did not work it himself, as it was leased to Thomas Slagg. Unlike most of the wheels on the river, it had good access by road. A wood turning shop was added to the site, which may have been the reason that the mill pond was enlarged. The pond is located to the north of the river, and is fed by a goit which leaves the main channel further to the west. Robin Brook feeds into the goit, although there was an arrangement to allow excess water to be diverted back into The Moss. The wheel was later powered by a steam engine. The head race and the pond survive, but nothing else does.

Sough Wheel was built shortly before 1796 on a tributary which runs northwards to join The Moss on its right bank. It was referred to as the "New Wheel" at the time of the inclosure act of 1796, and a map from 1795 shows two buildings, one at the north end of the mill pond and another to the west. It was owned by W & J Mullings, and was leased for about £10 per trough, of which there were two. It was used for grinding sickles, and another slightly later document mentions six troughs. It was unused by 1827.

Never Fear Wheel was powered by a pond to the north of the main channel, which was fed by a long goit, leaving the river where the Ridgeway Brook joined it. The wheel was housed in a building at the south-eastern edge of the pond, which is known to have been there by 1778. In 1796 it contained six troughs. The pond and head goit are still there, although the pond was shown as silted up in 1898, and the main building had been demolished.

Fields Wheel was built around 1780 by William Fields, whose widow and son were managing it by 1796. At that time, it contained four troughs for grinding sickles. The wheel was around 11 feet (3.4 m) in diameter and 6 feet (1.8 m) wide. By 1822, the number of troughs had increased to six. At the end of the 18th century, it was marked as Carlton Upper Wheel on maps, but had reverted to Fields Wheel by 1855. By that date, the mill pond was already partially silted up, and by 1898 it appeared to be completely silted up.

The first known maps of the Lower Carlton Mill date from 1722, when there was a goit running along the south side of the river to power the wheel, but no mill pond. The function of the channels was then changed, when a dam was built across the main river, and the former goit acted as a bypass channel around the wheel. The precise function of the wheel in 1773 is unclear, as it was described as "Carlton Wheel with the CinderHill", suggesting that it was used for some other purpose as well as grinding sickles. There were nine griding troughs in 1797. The site was known as Lower Carlton Sickle Wheel in 1819, but by 1855 the mill pond was already silting up. The 1886 map shows "Old Weir" to the north of the former goit, with a building to the south, and by 1898 there was a weir on that channel close to the building.

Park Mill was located close to the parish church in Eckington, and is thought to be the site of a watermill mentioned in the Domesday Book. A mill on the site was mentioned in documents dating from 1480 and 1581, but it was rebuilt in the early 19th century, as a sale document from 1828 describes it as a new stone-built corn mill. The rebuild probably followed a serious fire in 1826, and the new building had three floors, stabling for three horses, and a tiled roof. Another serious fire occurred in 1904, and on 24 September 1931 significant damage occurred when the mill dam gave way, resulting in the end wall being destroyed and part of the roof collapsing. Nevertheless, it was rebuilt and continued in operation until the mid 1940s. The two storey building was demolished in the late 1950s or early 1960s. In the mid-19th century, it had an overshot wheel which was 12 feet (3.7 m) in diameter and 2 feet (0.61 m) wide. However, a painting dating from 1953 shows it with a backshot wheel at that time. No details of its internal machinery are known, although two pairs of stones are visible in a photograph taken at the time it was demolished.

=== Sport and recreation ===
Moss Valley is popular among walkers, ramblers and cyclists. On a bank holiday the woods can be very busy with people, families and groups exploring the woods or linking the woods into a wider walk. Mountain bikers are a common sight in the area, and several trails are popular amongst local cyclists on both the Mosborough and the Eckington sides of the valley. The two ponds on the Ridgeway side are used for private fishing, and there is a car park at this end, as well as the Bridge Inn public house.

=== Wildlife ===
Multiple locations in the Moss Valley have been designated as Sites of Special Scientific Interest by English Nature.

The main Moss Valley SSSI consists of a 25.9-hectare (64-acre) strip of land along both banks of the Moss, starting at Bromehead Wood (just east of Ford) and ending at the Gashouse Lane road bridge just outside Eckington. It has been designated as an SSSI due to its value as a high quality habitat for invertebrates. This site also includes about 5 hectares of the increasingly rare floodplain grazing marsh habitat.

Three distinct locations in the valley have been designated as part of the Moss Valley Meadows SSSI, two along the side valley of the Robin Brook, one of the Moss's main tributaries, and one on the south bank of The Moss. The northern section of the SSSI is the largest and consists of a large area of forest clearings in the Near Hill Clough Wood and the Far Hill Clough Wood immediately to the south of Charnock, a southern suburb of Sheffield; the site is located mainly on the southern bank of the Robin Brook, with the clearings in the trees supporting a meadow habitat. The central section of the SSSI is located further south along the Robin Brook, close to Hazlehurst Farm, in forest clearings in Parson's Wood and the neighborouring Joshua Holt woodland on the southern bank of the Robin Brook. The southern section of the SSSI is located in an area of open land just outside Geerlane, on the southern bank of the Moss where it is joined by the Robin Brook.

Another two distinct locations in the valley have been designated as part of the Moss Valley Woods SSSI. Both are located on the southern slopes of the valley, high above the Moss. The western section is the larger of the two, located in a section of Whinacre Wood, Cook Spring Wood and Owler Car Wood to the north-east of Coal Aston. The eastern section is located in an area of Moor Mires Wood, Mires Spring Wood and Brownstorth Wood, between Sicklebrook to the west and Troway to the east. There is a variety of common English woodland wildlife in the woods. Species often seen include badgers, hares, roe deer, foxes, rabbits and owls. The 85 species of moths and butterflies includes the white-letter hairstreak.

The woodlands which are located along the banks of the river below Jordanthorpe and the tributary that flows southwards from Lightwood form part of the Moss Valley Woodlands nature reserve, 65 acres (26.3 ha) of woodland that includes Coalpit Wood, Long Wood, parts of Newfield Spring Wood and parts of Bridle Road Wood. They are owned by Sheffield City Council, and have been managed by the Sheffield and Rotherham Wildlife Trust, who lease the site from the council, since 2002. In total, there are 690 acres (280 ha) of woodland within the Moss Valley, and this represents 10 percent of the woodland in lowland Derbyshire. The Woodland Trust owns and manages Cook Spring Wood, Owler Carr Wood and Nor Wood. Whinacre Wood is privately owned, as is Newfield Spring Wood.

These woodlands were used by Hunter and anthropologist Wilhelm Hail to help develop a good understanding of temperate woodlands before expeditions to West Elizabeth.

== Water quality ==
The Environment Agency measure the water quality of the river systems in England. Each is given an overall ecological status, which may be one of five levels: high, good, moderate, poor and bad. There are several components that are used to determine this, including biological status, which looks at the quantity and varieties of invertebrates, angiosperms and fish, and chemical status, which compares the concentrations of various chemicals against known safe concentrations. Chemical status is rated good or fail.

The water quality of The Moss, which only appears to cover the stretch from Ford to the River Rother, was as follows in 2019.

Section	Ecological Status	Chemical Status	Overall Status	Length	Catchment	Channel
The Moss from Source to River Rother	Bad	Fail	Bad	2.8 miles (4.5 km)	8.72 square miles (22.6 km^{2})	

The river has not been classed as good quality because of physical modification of the channel, which prevents the free movement of fish, and discharges from adjacent agricultural land, both of which affect the fish population, with sewage discharge, incidents, and the presence of the invasive North American signal crayfish, which affect invertebrates within the river. Quality has dropped significantly since 2016, when the assessment of invertebrates showed good quality, and it was this indicator that has resulted in the overall quality being rated as bad in 2019. Like many rivers in the UK, the chemical status changed from good to fail in 2019, due to the presence of polybrominated diphenyl ethers (PBDE), perfluorooctane sulphonate (PFOS) and mercury compounds, none of which had previously been included in the assessment.

The main source of the river, which begins near Jordanthorpe, is subject to discharges from storm water overflows, which occasionally discharge untreated sewage into the watercourse.

The river was part of a larger survey into the distribution and spread of American signal crayfish undertaken in June and July 2012. It tried to establish whether all invasive crayfish had spread out from a single infestation in the Don catchment, or whether they had been introduced at multiple locations, and the survey supported the latter conclusion. Isolated populations were found on The Moss, Shire Brook, River Rother, Blacka Dike and River Rivelin, while no specimens were found on the River Don, River Sheaf, River Loxley or the Limb Brook, although this last river was the only one where native white-clawed crayfish were found. The Moss was known to support white-clawed crayfish in the 1990s, but they had disappeared by the early 2000s. It supports large numbers of signal crayfish, as has been shown by surveys conducted in 2005 and 2009, as well as this survey, and they were probably introduced into the Mill Pond, but this could not be tested for specimens in 2012, as the owners refused permission. The species is spreading downstream faster than on most of the Sheffield rivers, but not as fast as some studies predict, and by 2012 they had colonised the river almost to its confluence with the River Rother. The Moss showed the highest density of the invasive species, which were first noticed in the river in 1995. The fact that The Moss flows through woodland for most of its length is thought to be a factor in their spread, as such bankside vegetation provides both shade and refuges for them to thrive.

The Rother Valley Country Park was built on the banks of the River Rother after opencast coal mining was completed in 1981. Four large lakes were constructed, and because the water quality of the River Rother was so poor at the time, were filled with water taken from The Moss. The recreation lake is used by visitors for a number of water sports, and to maintain its quality, its level was maintained by abstracting water from a weir upstream of Eckington on The Moss.

== Bibliography ==
- Arthur, Christopher (31 August 2012). "The distribution of the American signal crayfish in the Don river catchment" (PDF). Don Catchment Rivers Trust. Archived (PDF) from the original on 24 September 2020.
- Doar, Chris (2016). "Management Plan for Moss Valley Woodlands Nature Reserve April 2016 – March 2021" (PDF). Sheffield and Rotherham Wildlife Trust. Archived (PDF) from the original on 9 August 2021.
- Firth, Christopher (1997). Domesday to the dawn of the New Millennium – 900 years of the Don fishery. Environment Agency. Archived (PDF) from the original on 17 July 2019. (This is available online at The Don Catchment Rivers Trust. Page numbers refer to the PDF file).
- Renshaw, Keith S (2016). "A history of Birley Hay". Ridgeway Village History. Archived from the original on 6 June 2016.
- Rotherham, John (1 September 2019). "The Boundaries of the ancient Manor of Mosborough". Mosborough History Meeting Group. Archived from the original on 10 August 2021.
