= Robin Brook (river) =

Stream in South Yorkshire, England

Coordinates: 53°20′23″N 1°24′48″W

The Robin Brook is a small stream originating in the south eastern part of the City of Sheffield in South Yorkshire, England. The source of the stream is in the Charnock area of the city, where it flows south, crossing the border into Derbyshire. It meets The Moss at Ford.

== History ==
The stream was referred to in 1570 as Robbyn brooke and in 1754 as Robbing Brook.

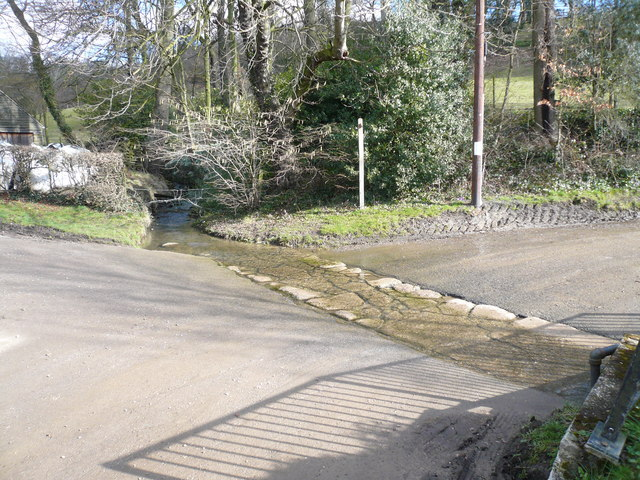
Robin Brook crossing Sloade Lane.

== Course ==
The stream originates in Charnock, flowing south, almost parallel to White Lane. It then enters Derbyshire at Ridgeway, heading south down Ridgeway Moor, crossing Sloade Lane in the hamlet of Geerlane. The stream then passes under the road at Ford before meeting The Moss.

Two areas along the course of the stream are part of the Moss Valley Meadows Site of Special Scientific Interest (SSSI). The northern area is the largest, and consists of a large area of forest clearings in the Near Hill Clough Wood and the Far Hill Clough Wood immediately to the south of Charnock. The site is located mainly on the southern bank of the Robin Brook, with the clearings in the trees supporting a meadow habitat. The southern area is located further south, close to Hazlehurst Farm, in forest clearings in Parson's Wood and the neighborouring Joshua Holt woodland on the southern bank of the Robin Brook. The SSSI includes a third area, which is located in an area of open land just outside Geerlane, on the southern bank of the Moss just upstream from where the Robin Brook joins it. The three areas are all north-facing, with neutral to acidic soils, and are populated by a rich variety of grassland animals and plants. They are one of the best preserved areas of semi-natural woodland in north east Derbyshire, and include several species which are either local or rare. They have been designated as an SSSI since 1990.
