= Robin Brook =

Robin Brook may refer to:

- Robin Brook (banker) (1908–1998), British merchant banker and Olympic fencer
- Robin Brook (river), a stream originating in the city of Sheffield, South Yorkshire, England

== See also ==
- Robin Brooke (born 1966), New Zealand rugby player
- Robin Brooks (disambiguation)
