= Moss Valley =

There are multiple valleys known as Moss Valley:

- Moss Valley, Wrexham, Wrexham in Wales
- Moss Valley, the valley carved out by The Moss, North East Derbyshire in England
