= Geerlane =

Hamlet in Derbyshire, England

Coordinates: 53°19′08″N 1°24′36″W

- Location within Derbyshire
- Shire county: Derbyshire
- Region: East Midlands
- Country: England
- Sovereign state: United Kingdom
- Post town: SHEFFIELD
- Postcode district: S12
- Police: Derbyshire
- Fire: Derbyshire
- Ambulance: East Midlands
- UK Parliament: North East Derbyshire

Geerlane is a hamlet in North East Derbyshire, England.

The hamlet is located in Moss Valley, by the side of The Moss. It has a farm, called Geerlane Farm, where a farmer was killed in 2010 after being trampled by his cattle.

The hamlet is located two-thirds mile (1.1 km) north of Troway, one-half mile (0.80 km) west of Ford, and 1 2/3 miles (2.7 km) south-east of Charnock in south-eastern Sheffield.

There was formerly a small quarry in Geerlane which provided the hamlet's main source of employment. Since its closure, the local economy has been based around farming.
