= Frecheville Comprehensive =

Location
- Fox Lane, Frecheville, South Yorkshire; S12; England; 53.3485°N 1.4079°W

Information
- School type: Secondary
- Motto: Honestas Quam Munera (Honour before honours)
- Founded: 1936
- Closed: July 1987
- Authority: City of Sheffield
- Age: 11 to 18
- Campus size: 8.4 hectares (21 acres)
- Feeder schools: Base Green Primary, Birley Spa Primary, Charnock Hall Primary

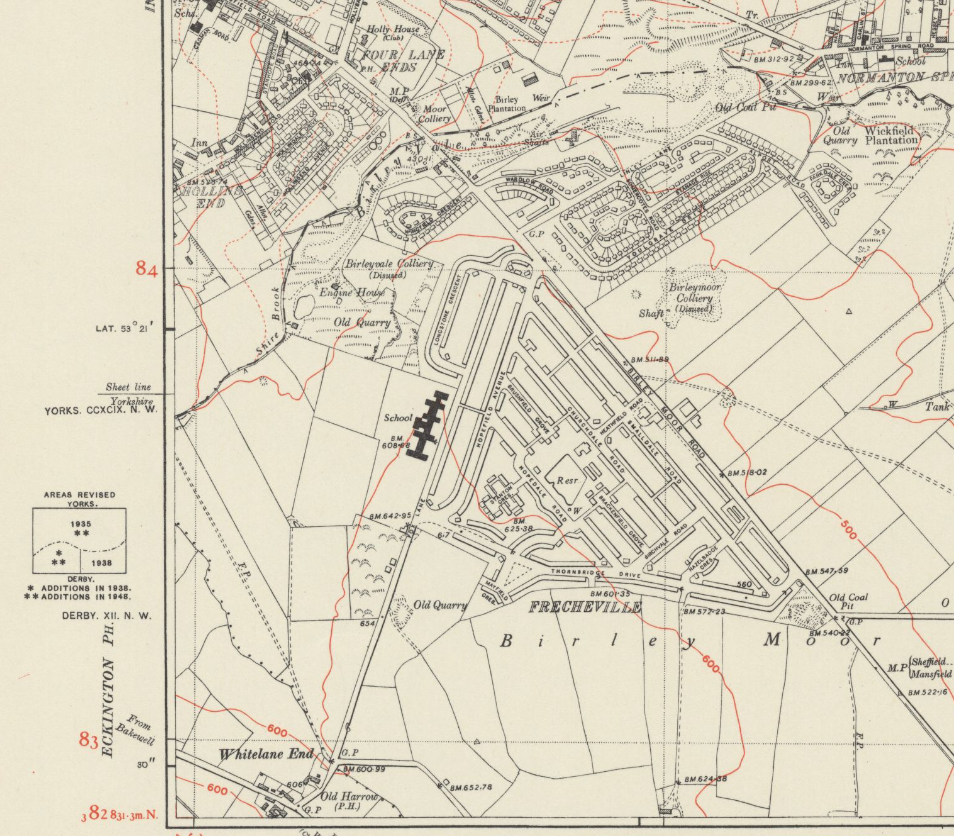
1950 Ordnance Survey map showing the location of Frecheville School (black buildings in centre of image)

Frecheville Comprehensive School was a secondary school located in Frecheville, South Yorkshire, England. When built, the school was in Derbyshire, but became a Sheffield city school following a boundary change in 1967. The school opened in 1936, merged with the nearby Thornbridge School, now The Birley Academy, in 1986, and closed permanently in 1987. The site is now a housing estate.

== Notable alumni ==
- Joanne Catherall, musician and member of synth-pop band The Human League. Attended the school between 1974 and 1979.
- Geoff Dey, Sheffield United and Scunthorpe United football player.
- Steve Faulkner, Sheffield United football player.
- Wayne Furniss, musician and early member of rock band Pulp.
- Mark Pearson, Manchester United, Sheffield Wednesday, Fulham and Halifax Town football player
- Ian Reddington, actor who played Richard Cole in EastEnders and Vernon Tomlin in Coronation Street.
- Susan Ann Sulley, musician and member of synth-pop band The Human League, attended the school between 1974 and 1979.
- Neil Warnock, football manager and player.
- Alan Woodward, Sheffield United football player.
- Rodger Wylde, Sheffield Wednesday, Oldham Athletic, Sporting CP, Sunderland, Barnsley and Stockport County football player

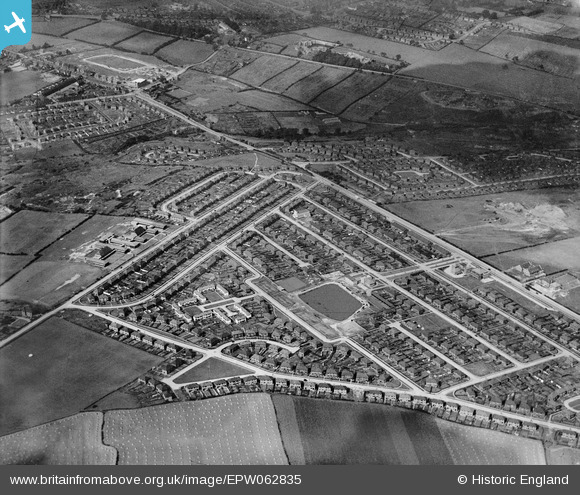
Aerial photograph of Frecheville from 1939, with Frecheville School at centre-left. Source: Britain From Above https://www.britainfromabove.org.uk/en/image/EPW062835

== Notable former teachers ==
- Veronica Hardstaff, who has served as a City councillor in Sheffield and Labour MEP from 1994 to 1999 for Lincolnshire and Humberside South, and married to Alan Billings, the South Yorkshire Police and Crime Commissioner since 2016, taught German from 1979 until the school's closure in 1986.

== Film and television ==
The BBC TV children's programme, The Best in Football, with the football legend George Best, was filmed on Frecheville School's playing fields in c.1971.
