= Ridgeway, Derbyshire =

Village in Derbyshire, England

Coordinates: 53.331°N 1.397°W

Ridgeway
- Village
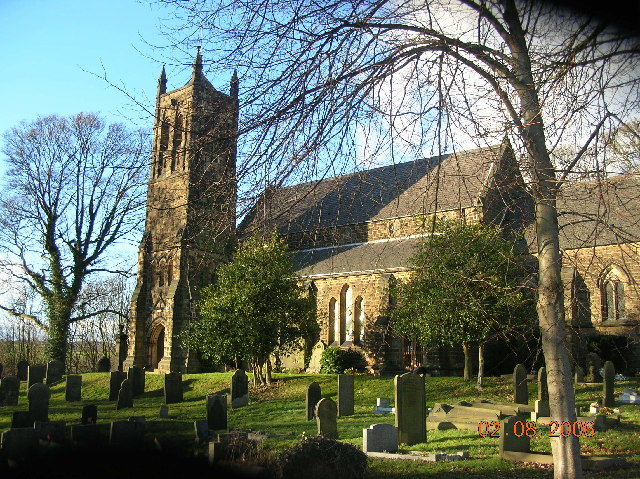
- St John The Evangelist Church

- Location within Derbyshire
- OS grid reference: SK401811
- Civil parish: Eckington
- District: North East Derbyshire
- Shire county: Derbyshire
- Region: East Midlands
- Country: England
- Sovereign state: United Kingdom
- Post town: SHEFFIELD
- Postcode district: S12
- Dialling code: 0114
- Police: Derbyshire
- Fire: Derbyshire
- Ambulance: East Midlands
- UK Parliament: North East Derbyshire

Ridgeway is a village in Eckington parish, North East Derbyshire in the English county of Derbyshire.

== Location ==
Ridgeway lies just south of the South Yorkshire border, around 5 miles southeast of Sheffield City Centre. The village is surrounded by a number of hamlets and villages with Highlane to the north, Ford, Bramley and Birley Hay to the south, Plumbley and Mosborough to the east, and Troway and Geerlane to the west.

== History ==
Ridgeway is believed to be around 700 years old, and would once have been part of Sherwood Forest. It is still a self-contained village, within North East Derbyshire, and is in the Moss Valley Conservation Area.

Ridgeway originally consisted of three smaller settlements: Sloadlane, Ridgeway and Ridgeway Moor. Also, many people amalgamate the nearby villages of Birley Hay, Ford and Highlane with the above settlements, though they do virtually run into one another today.

Ridgeway was once deeply involved in the local industry of sickle and scythe manufacturing, like its neighbouring villages. At one time, it had a large industrial scale scythe manufactury known as the Commonside Sickle Manufactory. It has now been converted into apartments. Similar manufactories could be found at Birley Hey, a hamlet built entirely as of industry, at Highlane, where Hutton & Co that ran the Phoenix Works resided and at Mosborough. Grindstones, likely brought in from Millstone quarries from what was to be the Peak district or Rotherham, stand testament to this old industry, and many can be found literally built into people's houses.

== Facilities ==
Ridgeway has a primary school (Ridgeway Primary School), a church (St John The Evangelist Church), a Methodist chapel, four pubs (The Bridge Inn, The Swan, The Queen's Head and The Phoenix Inn), sports facilities (football, tennis, bowls, cricket) and a restaurant (The Old Vicarage) that used to hold a Michelin Star.

== Notable residents ==
- Clinton Woods, IBF Light Heavyweight World Champion
- Mark Pearson (1939 - 2023), footballer

== See also ==
- Listed buildings in Eckington, Derbyshire
