= High Storrs School =

Academy in Sheffield, South Yorkshire, England

Location
- High Storrs Road; Sheffield, South Yorkshire, S11 7LH; England; 53.3576°N 1.5224°W

Information
- Type: Academy
- Motto: Designed for Success
- Established: 1933; 93 years ago
- Local authority: City of Sheffield
- Trust: Minerva Learning Trust
- Department for Education URN: 145455 Tables
- Ofsted: Reports
- Chair: David Mowbray
- Head teacher: Claire Tasker
- Gender: Mixed
- Age: 11 to 18
- Enrolment: 1695
- Houses: Crucible, Lyceum, Merlin, Montgomery
- Colours: Red, yellow, blue, green
- Former name: High Storrs Grammar School
- Website: www.highstorrs.co.uk

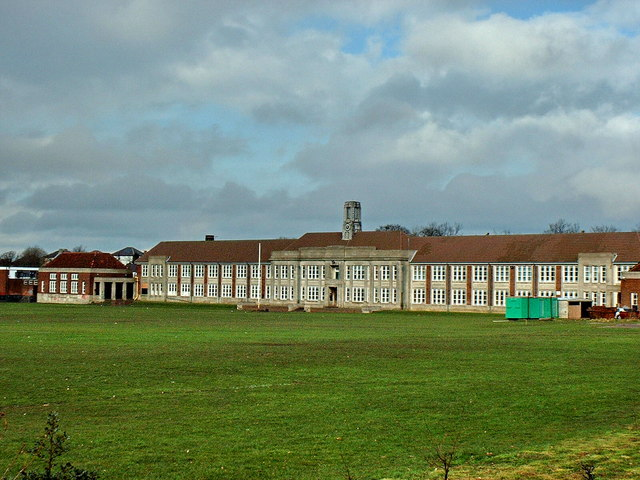
The back of the school before it was renovated.

High Storrs School is a mixed secondary school and sixth form college with academy status located on the south-western outskirts of Sheffield, England. The main school building is Grade II listed. It moved to its current site in 1933. The school does not have a set uniform, instead allowing students to wear what they like as long as the KS5 students wear identifying lanyards, and the student's outfit follows the dress code.

== Admissions ==
High Storrs has a Sixth Form in Ecclesall and is a specialist Arts College in the Performing Arts, with a secondary specialism in Maths and Computing.

== History ==
=== Central Technical School ===
The school opened on 10 March 1880 as the Sheffield Central Technical School in the centre of Sheffield. Its first headmaster was Mr. A. F. McBean. It built a new Science wing in 1895 and began providing science teaching for boys only. In 1904, the school became officially recognised as a secondary school. In 1906, the school was divided into two schools, one for boys and one for girls. It relocated to its present site at High Storrs in 1933. The Old Centralians was an association for former pupils that operated until 2015.

=== Grammar school ===
The building housed two separate grammar schools from the 1940s to 1968: High Storrs Grammar School for Boys, and High Storrs Grammar School for Girls. It was administered by the Sheffield Education Committee. The buildings were improved in the early 1960s.

=== Comprehensive ===
These were merged into a single comprehensive school, starting in September 1969 with around 1,600 boys and girls.

In 1993 a 17-year-old pupil was killed by a wound from a bayonet by a pupil of Notre Dame High School in Sheffield in Endcliffe Park.

==== Renovation ====
Almost £27 million was allocated for a complete refurbishment and remodelling of the school under the Government's Building Schools for the Future programme, with £2 million being spent on ICT equipment. Due to the school's Grade II listed status, only the interior of the main school building could be refurbished, with the exterior remaining almost unchanged. A new extension was built at the north end of the building to replace the old dining rooms, school hall and performing arts block, whilst a second extension was built to replace the 1960s additions at the south end of the school. This included a modern sports hall. Preparatory work on the field ready for the new temporary teaching rooms began in July 2008. Demolition of the 1960s extensions to the north of the school was completed in November 2008, and the project was completed in 2011. A grand opening event was held at the school on 17 September 2011, shortly after the school year had begun. At the event, the school launched their new commemorative book, titled High Storrs The Journey, which celebrated the school's history. It was sold for £9.99 to raise money for the school. There were also speeches from David Blunkett, former MP for Sheffield Brightside and Hillsborough.

==== Post-renovation ====
On 14 July 2016, the school announced that Claire Tasker was taking over from Ian Gage, the outgoing headteacher. At the time, Tasker was a co-head at Tapton School. She took over from Gage at the start of the 2016–17 academic year.

On 1 March 2018, the chair of the school's governing body and the headteacher jointly announced in a statement on the school website that it had become an academy and a member of the Minerva Learning Trust.

The school has had notable donations of laptops and other miscellaneous equipment from the Sheffield Freemasons, and all donated items state this with a sticker stating "donated by the Freemason's society".

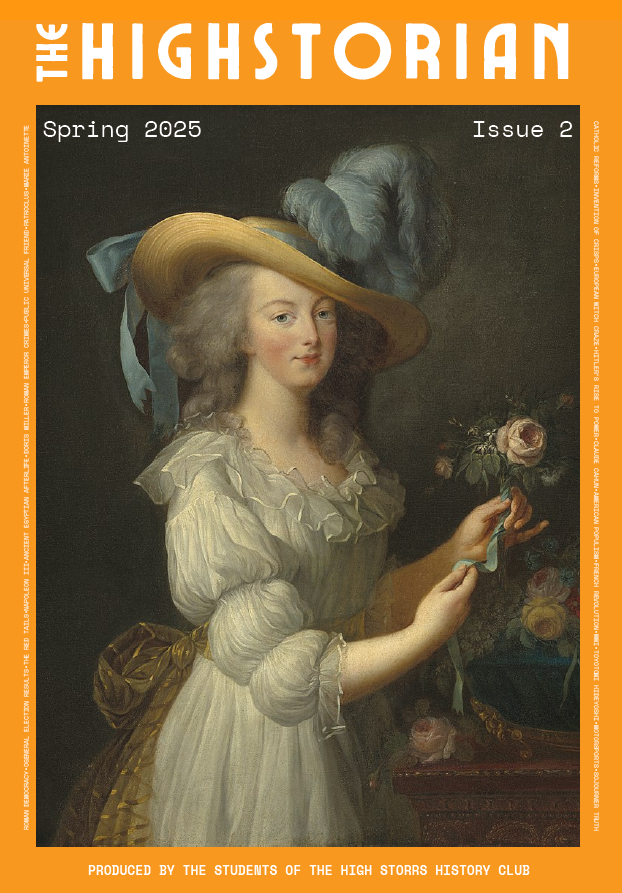
Highstorian Issue 2 Front Cover

In recent years, the school has run a History magazine club called The Highstorian, both written and edited by the pupil body from any year group, and organised by members of faculty. The magazine's pilot issue was an overwhelming success, even going as far as to win an award, and it has continued to run for a second and third issue, with one released each year.

== Houses ==
In 2008 the "Key Stage" system was changed to the Vertical System, where instead of year groups, there are houses with ten forms to each house. Each form has a varied number of pupils from Y7-11 and no sixth formers. There are 2 classes of around 30 in each house, so 8 classes. Forms 1–5 are a class and forms 6–10 are a class. This only applies to most classes in Y7 and Y8. This system is meant to reduce bullying and encourage friendships with pupils of different ages. The four houses are named after the main four theatres in Sheffield: Crucible, Lyceum, Merlin and Montgomery.

The houses also compete against each other in sporting events such as its annual sports day, held at the English Institute of Sport.

== Curriculum ==
In Y7 and Y8, students receive 3 hours each of Maths, English and Science a week. They also receive 2 hours of French, PE, Design and Technology/Food Tech (students typically receive 2 terms of D&T and 1 term of Food Tech a year), History and Geography and 1 lesson a week of PSHCEE and RE. Students also receive a lesson of ICT a week, however this is taught on a rotary basis in Y7, with the other half of the year spent learning Classics. Drama, Art, Music and Dance are also taught on a rotary basis in both years, with Y7s receiving one hour of Dance/Drama and two hours of Art/Music. Y8s, however receive one hour of Dance/Music and two hours of Art/Drama. English, Maths, Science, PSCHEE and PE are mandatory for the whole of KS4, whilst RE is only mandatory for Y9.

== Exam pass rate ==
=== GCSE Results (2025) ===
- 46% of all grades were 7 or higher (Grades 7–9)
- Exceptional science results: Over 70% of grades at 7+ in all three Triple Sciences
- History & Geography: Over 80% achieved grade 5+, with nearly 20% at grade 9
- Maths: 100% pass rate, nearly one-third of grades at 8+
- English & Maths combined:
  - 85% achieved grade 4+
  - 75% achieved grade 5+
- National recognition: Ranked 3rd best state secondary school in England for GCSE performance (highest non-selective school)

=== A-Level Results (2025) ===
- Average grade: B (city average is C+)
- A/A grades*: 33.5%
- A-B grades*: 62.5%
- A-C grades*: 82.5%
- *Pass rate (A-E)**: 98.6%
- Record Oxbridge success: 9 students secured places at Oxford or Cambridge
- Students progressed to top universities and competitive courses (Medicine, Law, Engineering, Performing Arts, etc.)

== Former teachers ==
- Veronica Hardstaff, Labour MEP 1994–1999 for Lincolnshire and Humberside South and Sheffield City Councillor 1970–1978 and 2002–2007, taught French and German at the girls' school 1963–1966.

== Notable former pupils ==
- Nick Matthew, squash player
- Matthew Barley, cellist
- Jessica-Jane Clement, television presenter
- Tom Ellis, actor
- Leslie Evans, Permanent Secretary to the Scottish Government from 2015 to 2021
- Henry Firth and Ian Theasby, vegan chefs known as BOSH!
- Yasmin Harper, diver
- Jayne Irving, GMTV presenter
- Jack Lester, footballer
- Chloe Newsome, actress
- Jessica Ransom, actress
- Kyle Walker, Burnley FC & England footballer
- Michael Jolley, football manager
- Steve Heighway, Ex Liverpool footballer
- Grace Clough, paralympic rower
- Esme Morgan, Manchester City footballer
- Jon Windle - Successful Solo Artist & Lead Singer of the Band Little Man Tate

=== High Storrs Grammar School for Girls ===
- Judith Bingham, composer
- Stella Greenall, involved in the introduction of student grants in 1962

=== High Storrs Grammar School for Boys ===
- Joseph Ashton, Labour MP from 1968 to 2001 for Bassetlaw
- Peter Glossop, opera singer
- Steve Heighway, footballer
- Paul Heiney, BBC reporter
- Rev Alfred Jowett, Dean of Manchester from 1964 to 1983
