= Troway =

Hamlet in Derbyshire, England

Coordinates: 53.310°N 1.409°W

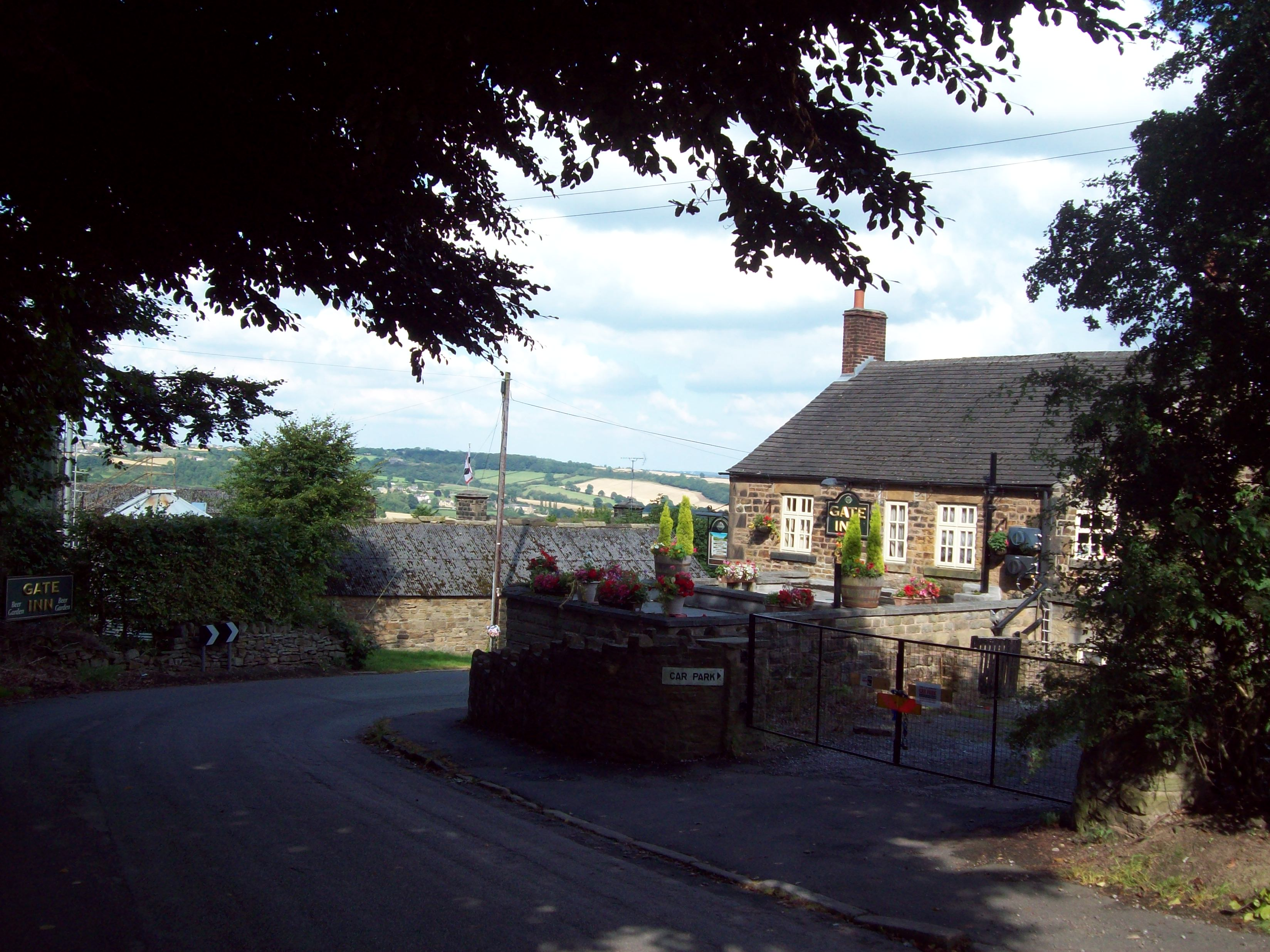
- The Gate Inn at Troway

- Location within Derbyshire
- Population: 200
- District: North East Derbyshire
- Shire county: Derbyshire
- Region: East Midlands
- Country: England
- Sovereign state: United Kingdom
- Post town: SHEFFIELD
- Postcode district: S21
- Dialling code: 01246
- Police: Derbyshire
- Fire: Derbyshire
- Ambulance: East Midlands
- UK Parliament: North East Derbyshire

Troway ( /ˈtroʊɪ/) is a hamlet in North East Derbyshire, England. Population details are included in the civil parish of Eckington. Troway is located in the Moss Valley, on both banks of the Troway Brook and its tributary the Vale Brook. The Troway Brook flows into The Moss near the hamlets of Birley Hay and Ford. In 2007, some major damage to houses in Troway was caused after the Troway Brook burst its banks.

The hamlet is located 2.2 miles (3.5 km) West of Eckington, 2 miles (3.2 km) East of Coal Aston, and 2.5 miles (4.0 km) South of Gleadless.
