= Veronica Hardstaff =

British politician (born 1941)

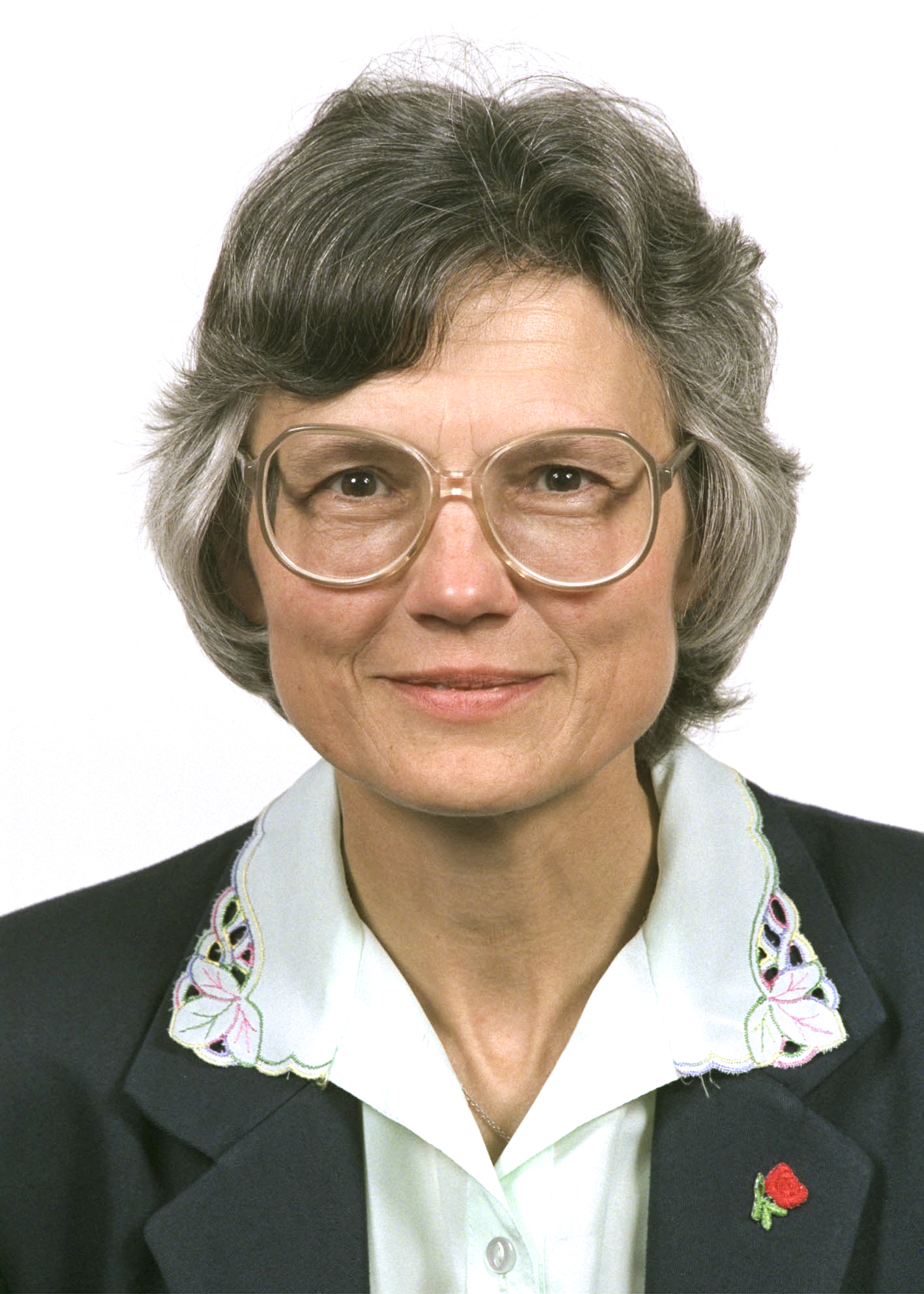
- Hardstaff in 1994

Member of the European Parliament for Lincolnshire and Humberside South
- In office 9 June 1994 – 10 June 1999
- Preceded by: Bill Newton Dunn
- Succeeded by: Constituency abolished

Personal details
- Born: Veronica Mary Tutt; 23 October 1941 (age 84)
- Party: Labour
- Education: University of Cologne

Veronica Mary Tutt Hardstaff Billings (born 23 October 1941) is a British politician who has served as a City councillor in Sheffield and as a Member of the European Parliament (MEP). A member of the Labour Party, she is on the left of the party.

== Education and career ==
Hardstaff went to the University of Manchester where she obtained a degree in German, and then studied at the University of Cologne. Hardstaff worked as a teacher of German and French, first at High Storrs Girls' Grammar School in Sheffield, then at St Peter's Secondary Modern School.

In 1971 she was elected as a Labour Party candidate to Sheffield City Council in Walkley ward, becoming a full-time councillor; she served for seven years. In 1977 she went back to work at Knottingley High School, moving in 1979 to the Frecheville School in Sheffield, and from 1986 to the Birley School.

At the 1992 UK general election she was the Labour Party candidate for the Sheffield Hallam constituency, but finished third.

== 1994 European election ==
At the 1994 European Parliament election, Hardstaff was the Labour Party candidate in Lincolnshire and Humberside South. This constituency was made up of seven constituencies for the United Kingdom Parliament, of which six were held by the Conservative Party. The Labour Party considered winning this election would be taking "a prize Tory scalp". In the end, Hardstaff was elected as Member of the European Parliament with a majority of 13,745.

== European Parliament ==
She was chosen by her colleagues as Chairwoman of the European Parliamentary Labour Party. In January 1995, she abstained from signing a declaration against a change in Clause IV of the Labour Party constitution, despite 36 Labour MEPs doing so. With an agricultural constituency she took up farming issues, calling for a new approach to food quality after the BSE scandal including stricter regulation of intensive farming. When Lincolnshire was described as a prosperous area, she wrote to object based on the low wages paid to some farmworkers. She was also Vice-Chairman of the Joint Parliamentary Committee between the European Parliament and Poland from 1995.

For the 1999 European Parliament election, the electoral system was changed to list-based proportional representation. Hardstaff was placed at sixth out of seven on the regional list for Yorkshire and the Humber, a place which made it practically impossible for her to be re-elected; this low placing was attributed to her alliance with the left. In the election, Labour won only three seats in the region.

== Sheffield City council ==
In 2002, Hardstaff was elected to Sheffield City Council for a second term, from Walkley ward. In May 2005 she was appointed to the cabinet of Sheffield as member for Children's Services, responsible both for education and for social services to children. She supported plans to bring in a City Academy to replace an existing secondary school, sponsored by a Christian educational charity; she also defended the use of the Private Finance Initiative as a pragmatic way of supporting investment. She left the Sheffield cabinet in May 2006 and in May 2007 was defeated in her re-election bid in Walkley. She stood again in Walkley ward in 2008, but was defeated. At the same election Hardstaff's brother, Chris Tutt, was re-elected to Sheffield City Council, in Mosborough ward, for the Liberal Democrats.

== Personal life ==
She married in 1964 and had a son and daughter, but divorced in 1977, retaining her married name. Since 2007 she has been married to Rev. Canon Alan Billings, the Police and Crime Commissioner for South Yorkshire, and Deputy Leader from 1980-86 of Sheffield City Council.

European Parliament
Preceded by Bill Newton Dunn	Member of European Parliament for Lincolnshire and Humberside South; 1994–1999	Constituency abolished
