= Lincolnshire (European Parliament constituency) =

Former European Parliament constituency

- European Parliament constituency
- Boundary within the East Midlands (1979-1984)
- Member state: United Kingdom
- Created: 1979
- Dissolved: 1994
- MEPs: 1

Prior to its uniform adoption of proportional representation in 1999, the United Kingdom used first-past-the-post for the European elections in England, Scotland and Wales. The European Parliament constituencies used under that system were smaller than the later regional constituencies and only had one Member of the European Parliament each.

The constituency of Lincolnshire was one of them.

When it was created in England in 1979, it consisted of the Westminster Parliament constituencies of Gainsborough, Grantham, Grimsby, Holland with Boston, Horncastle, Lincoln, Louth, Rutland and Stamford, although this may not have been true for the whole of its existence.

Boundary within the East Midlands (1984-1994)

== MEPs ==
Elected	Member	Party
1979	Bill Newton Dunn	Conservative
1994	Constituency abolished	

== Election results ==
European Parliament election, 1979: Lincolnshire
Party	Candidate	Votes	%	±%
Conservative	Bill Newton Dunn	104,460	61.5	
Labour	Carl A. James	44,616	26.3	
Liberal	C. W. Phillips	20,815	12.2	
Majority		59,844	35.2	
Turnout		169,891	31.3	
Conservative win (new seat)				

European Parliament election, 1984: Lincolnshire
Party	Candidate	Votes	%	±%
Conservative	Bill Newton Dunn	92,606	52.3	−9.2
Labour	Chris W. Sewell	47,161	26.7	+0.4
Liberal	Gavin B. Purves	37,244	21.0	+8.8
Majority		45,445	25.6	
Turnout		177,011	32.1	
Conservative hold		Swing		

European Parliament election, 1989: Lincolnshire
Party	Candidate	Votes	%	±%
Conservative	Bill Newton Dunn	92,043	45.4	−6.9
Labour	Steven Taggart	71,393	35.2	+8.5
Green	Miss J. S. Steranka	24,908	12.3	New
SLD	James P. Heppell	14,341	7.1	−13.9
Majority		20,650	10.2	−15.4
Turnout		202,685	34.6	+2.5
Conservative hold		Swing		
