= Gleadless War Memorial =

War memorial in Sheffield, England

Coordinates: 53°21′03″N 1°25′26″W

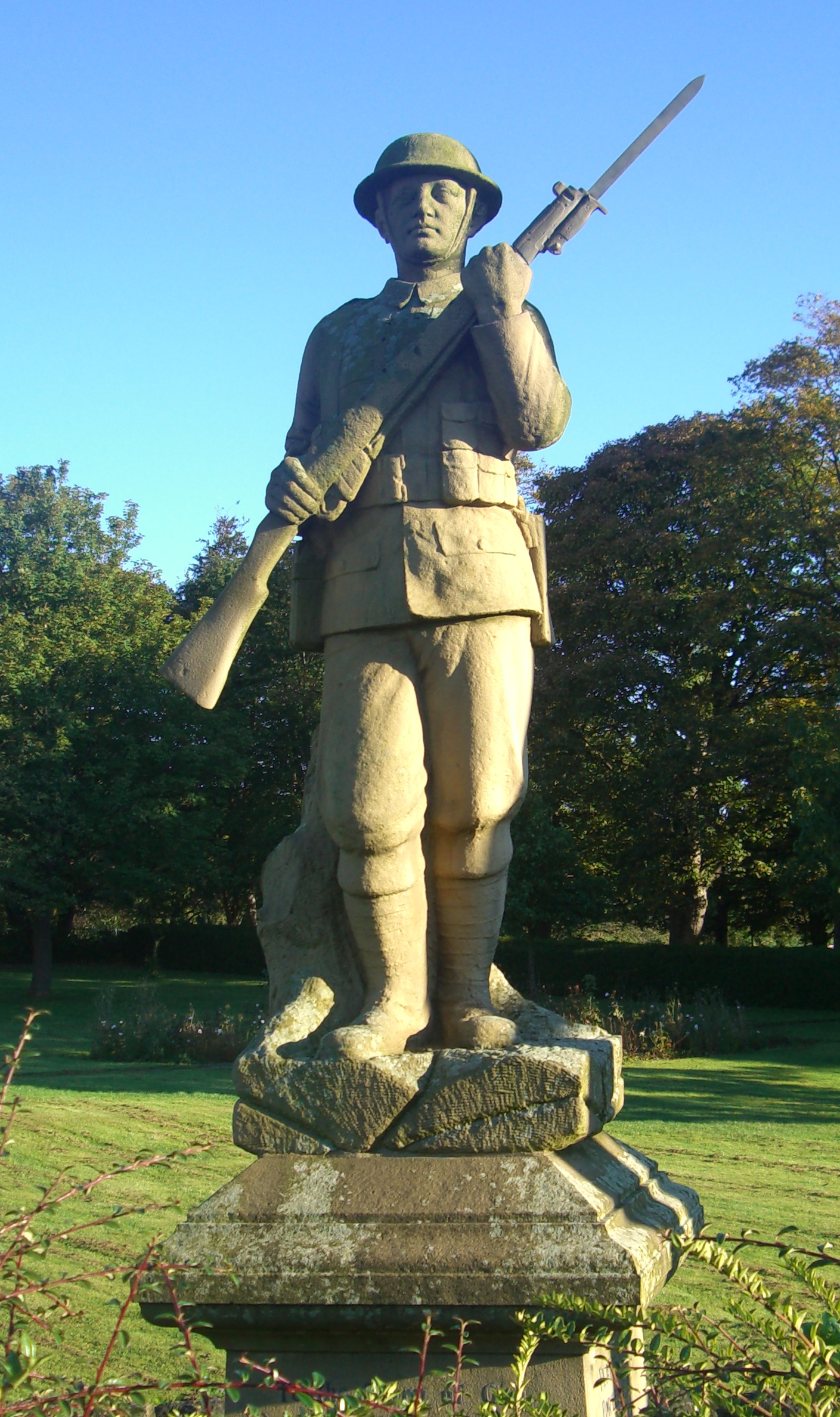

The Gleadless War Memorial is a Grade-II listed war memorial located on Hollinsend Road at Gleadless, Sheffield. The statue, which depicts a life size sandstone British soldier dressed in a First World War uniform, was put in place during the 1920s.
