= Frecheville =

Village in South Yorkshire, England

Coordinates: 53.348°N 1.401°W

- Suburb
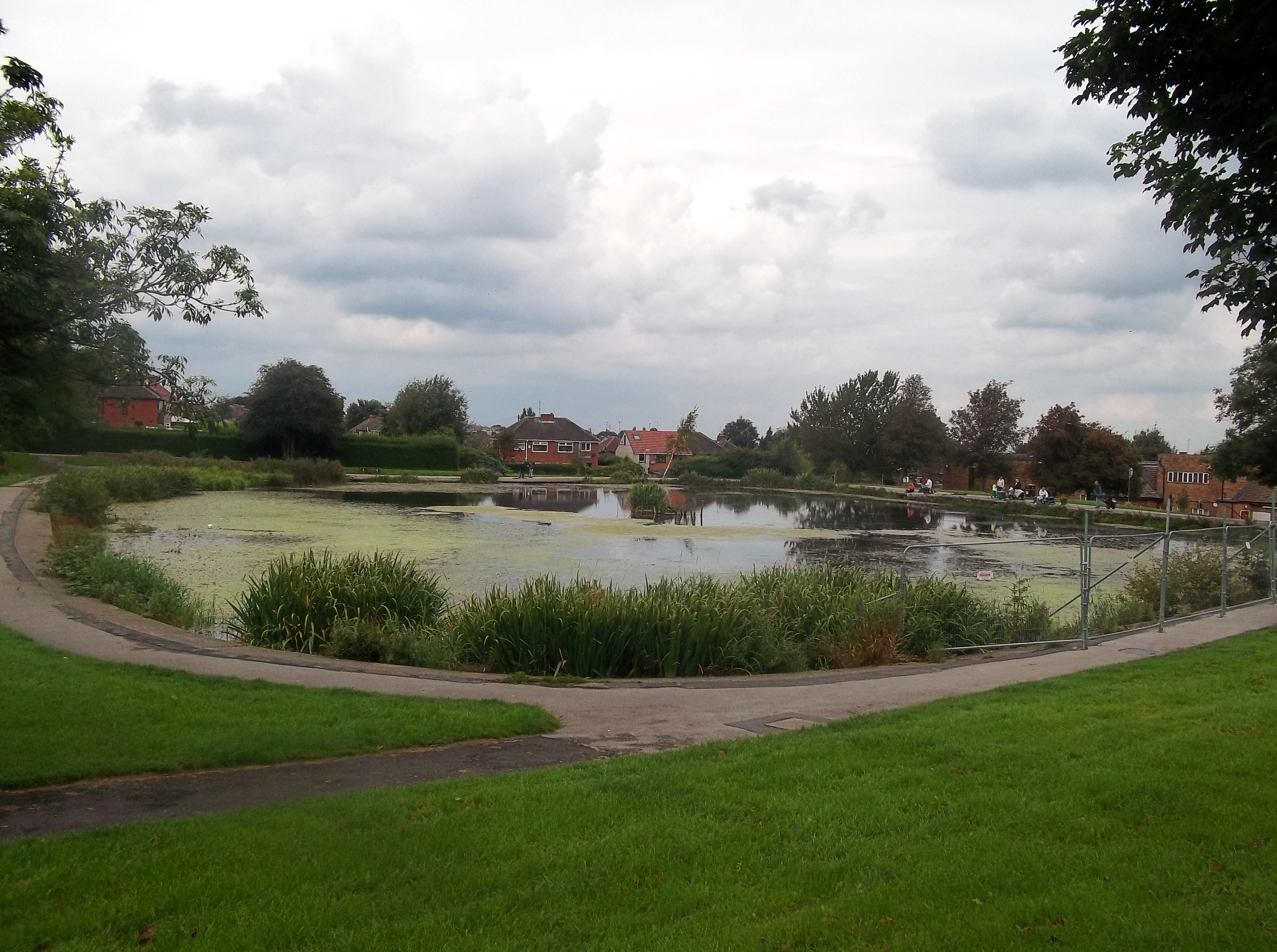
- Frecheville Pond

- Location within South Yorkshire
- OS grid reference: SK398838
- Metropolitan borough: Sheffield
- Metropolitan county: South Yorkshire
- Region: Yorkshire and the Humber
- Country: England
- Sovereign state: United Kingdom
- Post town: SHEFFIELD
- Postcode district: S12
- Police: South Yorkshire
- Fire: South Yorkshire
- Ambulance: Yorkshire
- UK Parliament: Sheffield South East

Frecheville (/ˈfrɛʃvɪl/ FRESH-vil) is a suburb five miles (8.0 km) south-east of Sheffield city centre. The estate was built in the 1930s when the area was in Derbyshire. However, due to expansion, Frecheville and a number of surrounding villages became part of the city of Sheffield in 1967 and thus the West Riding of Yorkshire.

== History ==
Frecheville was built as a housing estate to the north of Birley Estate developed in the 1930s by Henry Boot Limited. The firm constructed around 1,600 private houses, mainly traditional brick built 2 or 3 bedroom semi-detached family homes for rent and gave the Frecheville estate its name. A local pub's signboard shows the coat of arms of the Frecheville family, who were lords of the manor at Staveley but there is no evidence that the Frechevilles ever owned land on Birley Moor, so the name given to Frecheville remains something of a mystery.

Prior to the 1940s, Birley Collieries provided employment to much of the surrounding area. The site of the colliery was later transformed into the Shire Brook Valley Local Nature Reserve at Normanton Spring.

Memorial stone to John Alexander Cohen

On Thursday 26 May 1955 a Gloster Meteor F8 (No. WE916) piloted by 21-year-old John Alexander Cohen from Cardiff on a night flight training exercise from RAF Worksop crashed in Frecheville when he apparently lost control whilst undertaking a controlled descent through cloud. The plane came in low over Stradbroke Road and the pilot was killed instantly as the plane dived steeply into the ground and exploded on impact in the field at the bottom of Silkstone Crescent at 11.22 pm. There was speculation at the time that he had deliberately stayed with the plane to steer away from the houses and into an open area. A memorial stone was placed in the garden at the top of the footpath down to the housing estate but was later removed. In May 2025, the memorial was reinstated.

== Amenities ==
Frecheville features a shopping area along Birley Moor Road, known locally as 'Frecheville Shops'. There are four public houses in the area: The Birley (formerly the Birley hotel) and The Sherwood on Birley Moor Road, the Jack in a Box on Silkstone Road and The Fairway on Birley Lane. A fifth pub, named The Frecheville, once operated to the west of the area, however this has since closed.

Frecheville Pond, a popular fishing site is located behind the main shopping area, close to the parish church of St. Cyprians, and the Methodist church. A library and community centre were also situated near the pond, and were responsible for running the Frecheville carnival between 1937 and 2008.

Frecheville Comprehensive and Thornbridge School were the main schools in the area during the 20th Century, with the latter becoming The Birley Academy.

The area of Frecheville was also had a council run library service until this facility was withdrawn in 2014 by the local authority as a cost cutting measure. The replacement of the council run library service in Frecheville by a volunteer-led facility has been controversial, with prominent library campaign group Voices For The Library highlighting major concerns around volunteers having responsibility for the "Books On Prescription" service and issues surrounding data protection. The transfer of the library to volunteers has also resulted in huge decreases in book loans and other usage.

== Scowerdons Estate ==
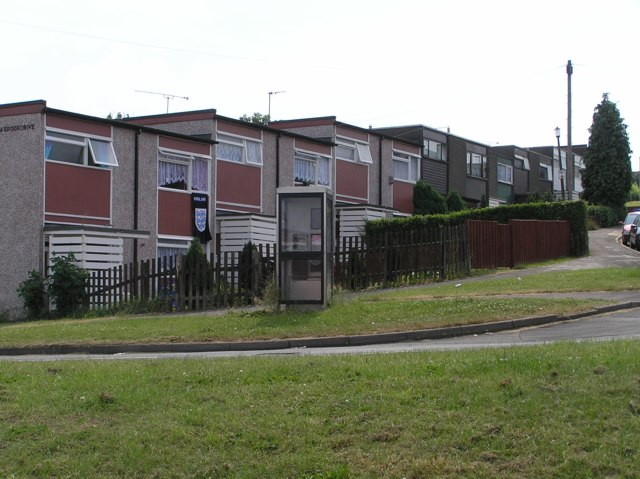
Scowerdons Estate

The Scowerdons estate is located in the east of Frecheville. The estate featured a number of Vic Hallam houses that were demolished in 2014. The estate was named after Scowerdons Farm, which was located to the south, on land now occupied by the A57 dual carriageway. Most of the original estate was demolished in 2012, and replacement housing has been constructed on part of the estate, but most of the area remains vacant as of 2024.

== Sport ==
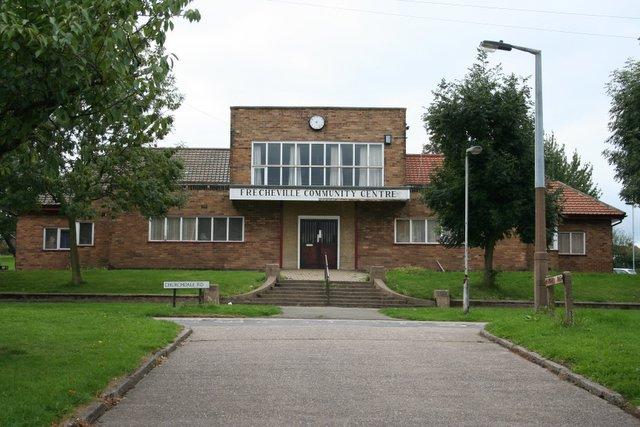
Frecheville Community Centre

Frecheville Community Sports & Social Club is located on Silkstone Road. The club features a cricket ground, home to the Frecheville Cricket Club.

Frecheville Community Association F.C. also played their home games at the club before dissolving in 2020.

Birley Wood Golf Club is situated to the south of the area.

== Transport ==
The southern part of the area is served by two tram stops on the Supertram's Blue Route. 8 local bus routes also serve the suburb.

== Famous Inhabitants ==
- Ex-Sheffield United football manager Neil Warnock was born on Youlgreave Drive.
- Coronation Street actor Ian Reddington also grew up on Youlgreave Drive.
- Susan Ann Sulley and Joanne Catherall of The Human League both attended Frecheville Comprehensive School.
- Mark Pearson who went on to play for Manchester United attended Frecheville Comprehensive School.
- Wayne Furniss of Pulp attended Frecheville Comprehensive School, while lead singer Jarvis Cocker of Pulp grew up in neighbouring Intake.
- Crime Novelist Simon Beckett attended Frecheville Comprehensive School.
- 1970s History Teacher and Head of Sixth Form at Frecheville Comprehensive Alan Farmer went on to teacher training in Lancaster, before writing dozens of definitive history text books, with a special interest in the United States Civil War.

== See also ==
- Birley
- Hackenthorpe
