= Stella Greenall =

- Born: 8 October 1926; Sheffield, West Riding of Yorkshire
- Died: 18 June 2008 (aged 81)
- Occupation: Education Activist

Stella Margaret Greenall (8 October 1926 – 18 June 2008), born Stella Draycott, was an education activist and adviser to the United Kingdom government. Between 1952 and 1975 she worked at the National Union of Students of the United Kingdom (NUS) and during this time was instrumental in the creation of a universal system of grants for higher education students in Britain.

== Early life ==
Born in Sheffield, and a pupil at High Storrs Grammar School for Girls, she attended St Hugh's College, Oxford.

== Work with NUS ==
Greenall was first involved with NUS as a student in the 1940s. She was later employed as a member of staff in 1952, and during her tenure she played a key role in developing the union's education and welfare campaigns, especially around student finance. She was known as a formidable negotiator, and this culminated in the introduction, in 1962, of mandatory grants for all higher education students in the UK, a system which was in large part unchanged until the introduction of tuition fees in 1998.

== Later life ==
In 1975, Greenall was persuaded to leave NUS to work as an advisor to the then Labour Education Secretary, Fred Mulley. She also advised his successor, Shirley Williams, until the Conservative victory in the 1979 elections. She was a staunch member of the Fabian Society.

In 1998 she cancelled her standing order to the Labour Party as a result of their introduction of tuition fees.

== Numismatic Interests ==
After his death in 1991, Greenall progressed her husband Philip's work on dividing 17th century tokens between London and Middlesex to publication in the British Numismatic Journal #61 from 1991. She also publicised with it a map in the London Topographical Society Newsletter of November 1993.

Greenall presented their collection of 870 Venetian coins and 23 medals to the British Museum, a gift which was celebrated with the exhibition 'Venice Preserv'd' which ran from 9 November 1993 to 13 February 1994.

In February 2008, Greenall attended the launch of the publication of Norweb Tokens Part VII in Harrow, London. Previously she had published three valuable analyses of 17th century tokens by place and by date.

Greenall died of cancer on 18 June 2008.
