= Plumbley =

Hamlet in South Yorkshire, England

Coordinates: 53.322886°N 1.379508°W

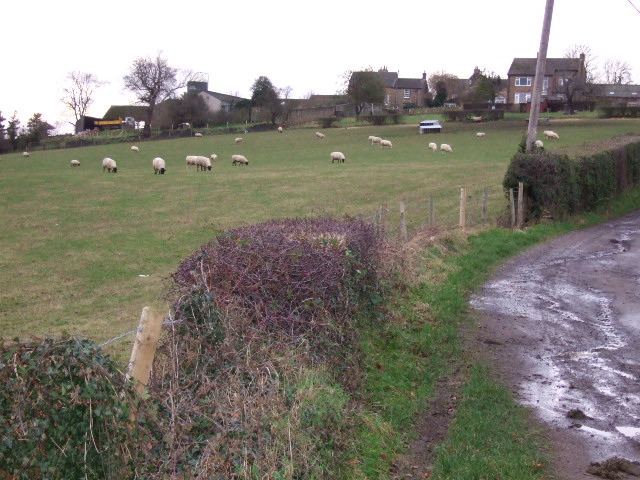

- Location within South Yorkshire
- Metropolitan borough: Sheffield
- Metropolitan county: South Yorkshire
- Region: Yorkshire and the Humber
- Country: England
- Sovereign state: United Kingdom
- Post town: SHEFFIELD
- Postcode district: S20
- Police: South Yorkshire
- Fire: South Yorkshire
- Ambulance: Yorkshire

Plumbley is a hamlet in the City of Sheffield borough, within the county of South Yorkshire in England.

== Location ==
Plumbley consists of a small scattering of farms and cottages with a couple of lanes providing access. It lies in the far southeast of the borough in a rural portion of the city, just north of the village of Marsh Lane, north-west of Eckington, west of Mosborough and southeast of the village of Ridgeway. The hamlet and surrounding environs are within the South and West Yorkshire Green Belt, so helping to preserve its rustic setting by curtailing development.

The Moss brook runs along the southern extent of the area, forming one of the southernmost Sheffield boundaries. Moss Valley is designated as a Site of Special Scientific Interest. Several small forested areas include Bushes, Kent, Cadman, and Ladybank woods, along with Wren Park which has the highest point at 178 metres (584 feet). Several footpaths and bridleways feature through the area, with the Sheffield Country Walk route following the valley.

== History ==
Plumbley was formerly in Eckington parish of Derbyshire, but boundary changes in 1967 moved it, along with Mosborough into the latter ward within Sheffield's borders, to allocate more housing land to the city.

The hamlet itself consists mainly of farmland, and historically farming along with sickle-smithing along the local brooks and streams would have been the main occupations in the area.

=== Plumbley Hall ===
There was a Plumbley Hall that existed in the early 1800s, then owned by a Mr. Pedley. He purchased the hall from Captain Stones, of Mosborough Hall .

=== Plumbley Windmill ===
A windmill was constructed in 1802, with a mention given in the Manor court rolls on 4 June 1802: ‘ Thomas Unwin of Mosborough, yeoman, John Unwin of Plumley Lane, millwright and John's wife Rebecca, had a messuage on Plumley Lane together with a newly erected windmill for the grinding of corn into flour.’ The windmill is not mentioned any later than 1852, and it is presumed to have been destroyed around this time.

=== 19th century ===
An old tramway and quarry site are shown on 19th century maps in the Cadman Wood area.

In the late 19th century there were two collieries in the hamlet, Westwell and Plumbley, the latter having its own railway branch line (Penny Engine railway) and a notable engine house which is registered as a Scheduled Ancient Monument. Plumbley was sunk around 1875 and was disused by 1914. It was the site of an unfortunate incident on 16 March 1895 when a colliery worker and children drowned in a pond while he was trying to save them after falling in. Westwell was actually nearer to the area, sunk in 1876, it was disused by 1901.

A hoard of Roman denarii coins was found in 2012 in farmland by a treasure hunter using a metal detector, these are now held by Museums Sheffield.
