= Gleadless =

Suburb of Sheffield, England

Coordinates: 53.345773°N 1.426882°W

- Location within South Yorkshire
- Metropolitan borough: Sheffield
- Metropolitan county: South Yorkshire
- Region: Yorkshire and the Humber
- Country: England
- Sovereign state: United Kingdom
- Post town: SHEFFIELD
- Postcode district: S12
- Dialling code: 0114
- Police: South Yorkshire
- Fire: South Yorkshire
- Ambulance: Yorkshire
- UK Parliament: Sheffield Heeley

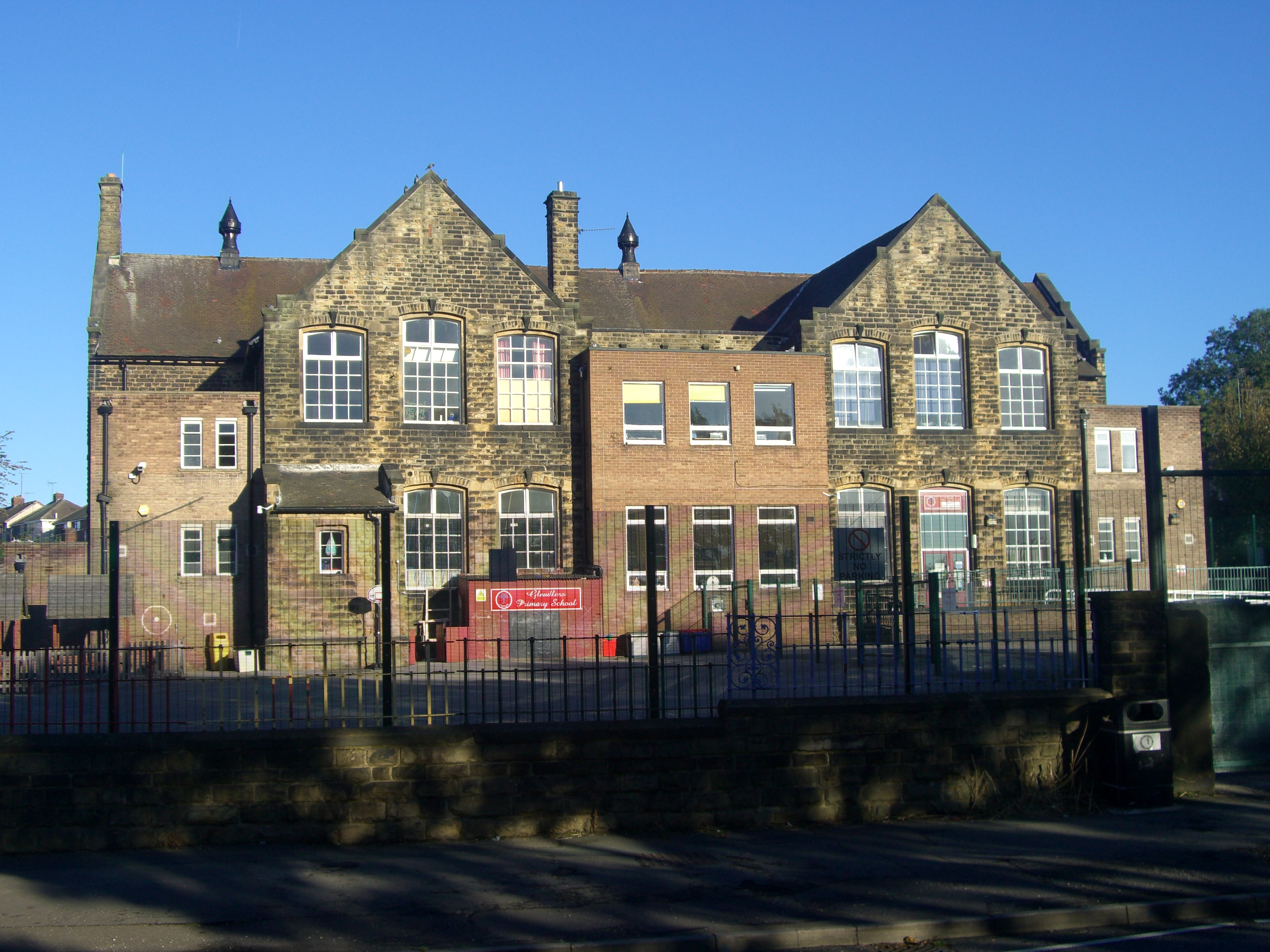
Bents Green School at Gleadless.

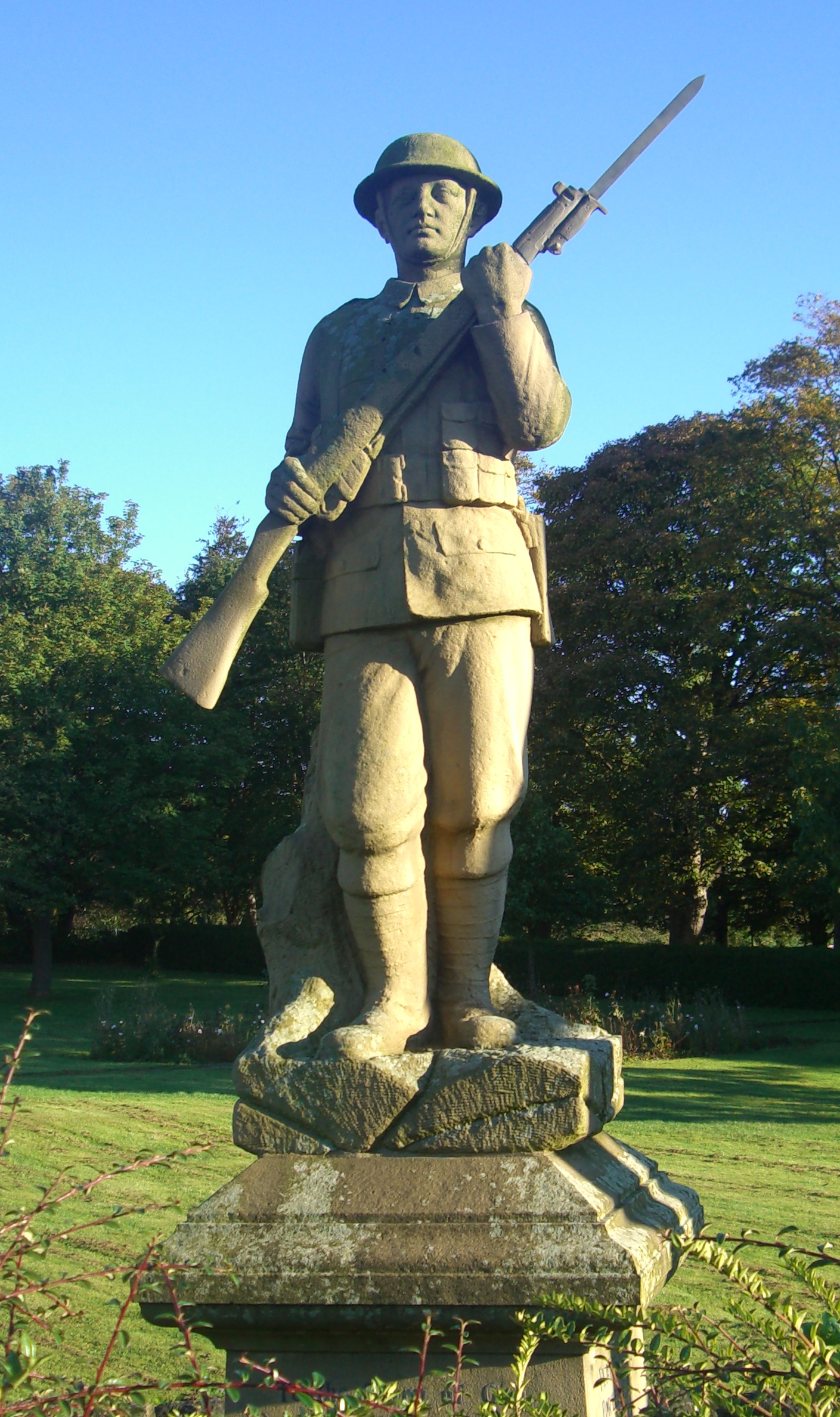
The war memorial on Hollinsend Road.

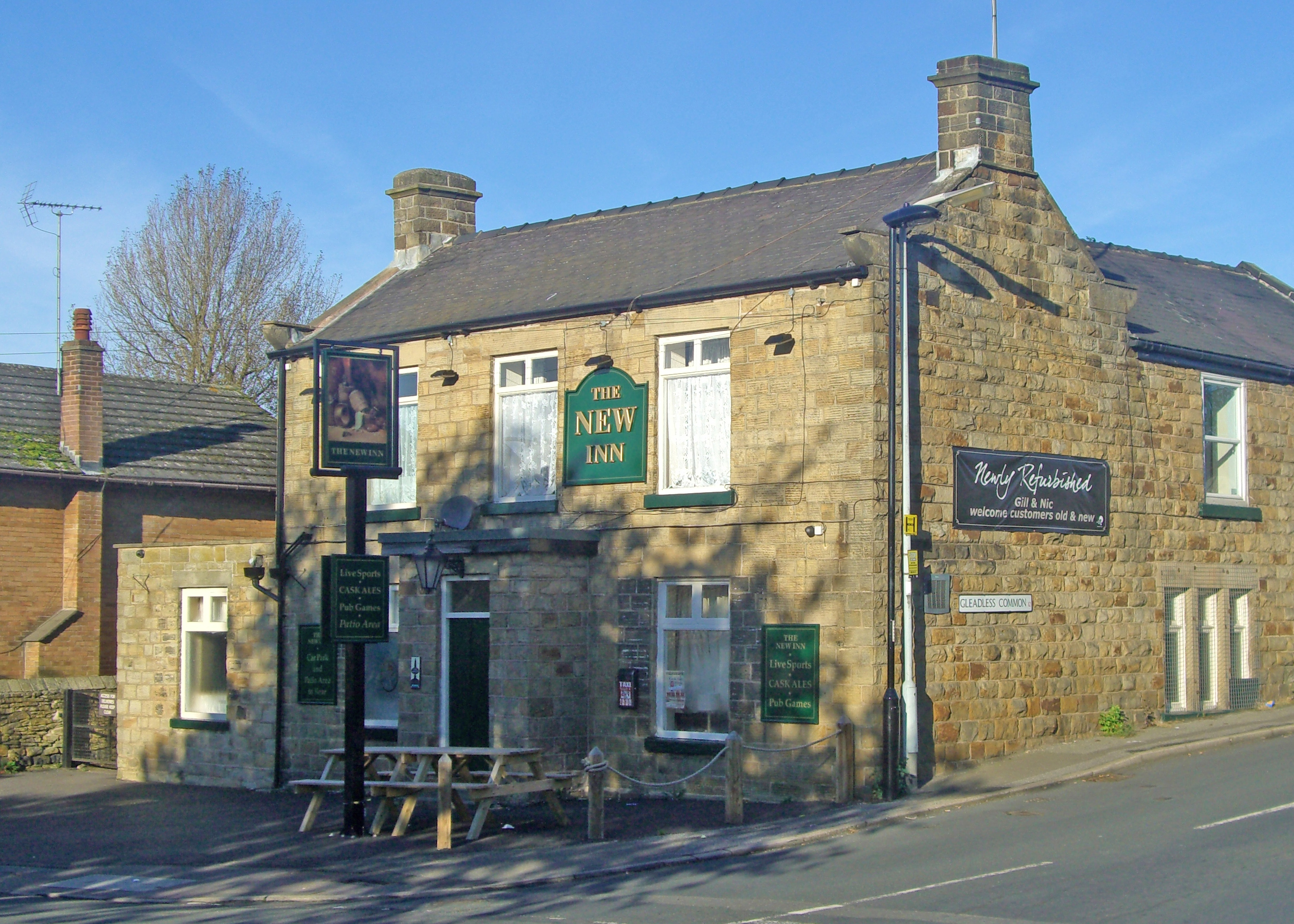
The New Inn on the corner of Gleadless Common and Hollinsend Road.

Gleadless (/ˈɡliːdlɪs/) is a suburb and parish within the City of Sheffield, it lies 3 miles (5 km) south east of the city centre. It is bordered by the adjoining suburbs of Gleadless Valley (in whose ward the population falls) to the west, Frecheville to the east and Intake to the north. The land to the south is the rural area of North East Derbyshire district which is outside the city boundary. Gleadless was formerly a country hamlet, then village before becoming part of the expanding city of Sheffield in 1921. The word Gleadless comes from the Old English language and means either "forest clearings haunted by a kite" (gleoda) or "bright clearing" (glaed).

== History ==
The first written mention of Gleadless dates from 1307 when it was referred to as "Gladeleys in the parish of Handesworth" in a land transaction between Jociamus le Scrop and Henry de Wodetorp. John Speed's map of 1610 calls the area "Gledles" and shows it on the edge of the fenced enclosure called "The Maner". The Maner also known as Sheffield Park was owned by the Duke of Norfolk and had abundant forests upon it. By the end of the 17th century much of the woodland in the park had been cut down with the land being turned over to farming and small scale coal mining. Because of the geology of the district, coal mining would become an important occupation for the area with much of the coal near the surface in shallow seams. A manorial licence shows that coal was dug in the Gleadless area as early as 1579. 18th century agriculture in the area was based on the open field system with common rights on what is today Gleadless Common.

The 1851 census gave Gleadless village a population of only 740, however by 1881 the population had increased to 2,306 with the increased demand for coal drawing many coal miners to the area, especially after the sinking of Birley East Colliery in 1887. The coming of free education in the 1890s saw the opening of, what is today, Gleadless Primary School on 18 April 1898. As with many outlying villages of Sheffield, the coming of the Sheffield Tramway in the early 20th century brought big changes to Gleadless. The south eastern arm of the network reached as far as Intake, just to the north of Gleadless and had a major impact on the end of village life. Employment demographics were changed radically in Gleadless when the last coal was mined at Birley East Colliery in 1943 and many miners moved from the village to work at the Rother Vale Collieries or found alternative employment.

In 1921 Gleadless became part of the City of Sheffield under the Sheffield Extension Order of that year. Changes were not immediate but it became obvious to the local population that something had to be done to try and preserve the rural landscape after the controversial demolition of Park House Farm and the building of the nearby Arbourthorne estate in the 1930s. The Council for the Protection of Rural England became involved in the fight to stop house building on the agricultural land around Gleadless and Norton villages. This had little effect as Gleadless became fully integrated into the city and became surrounded by housing estates. Birley Farm's land became the Frecheville estate, Charnock Hall Farm became the Charnock estate and St. Peter's church and the Base Green estate was built on the site of Base Green Farm.

== Present day ==
Today Gleadless is a suburban community with a population of over 4,000, it is an area of mostly white residents with only a small percentage of ethnic minorities (2.6%). It is an area of above average living standards and low unemployment according to NHS statistics. The suburb has excellent transport links being on the South Yorkshire Supertram blue and purple routes, there are three tram stops serving the Gleadless area, Hollinsend, Gleadless Townend and White Lane. The tram tracks divide at the Gleadless Townend stop with the main blue route continuing to Halfway while a short spur of the purple route goes to the Herdings Park terminus.

The suburb has four GP practices within half a mile of its centre, these being the White Lane Medical Centre, Stonecroft Medical Centre, Charnock Health Centre and the Jaunty Springs Health Centre. There are three primary schools in the immediate area, these are Gleadless Primary School, Charnock Hall Primary School and Valley Park Community School. Older children attend either Birley Community College or Sheffield Springs Academy. Recreation areas in the suburb include Hollinsend Park, which accommodates the Hollinsend Bowling Club (founded 1932) with two greens. The park was awarded £39,000 in 2012 for the conversion of two old tennis courts into a new multi sport games arena. Jaunty Park is a small recreation area while Gleadless Common has been enlarged in recent years when Myrtle Springs School was closed and some of its grounds were integrated into the common. Four pubs in the area are the Centre Spot on Jaunty Lane, the Hollin Bush and New Inn both on Hollinsend Road, and the Red Lion at Gleadless Townend, the Red Lion has the Shire Brook stream rising as a spring in its cellar.

== Significant buildings ==
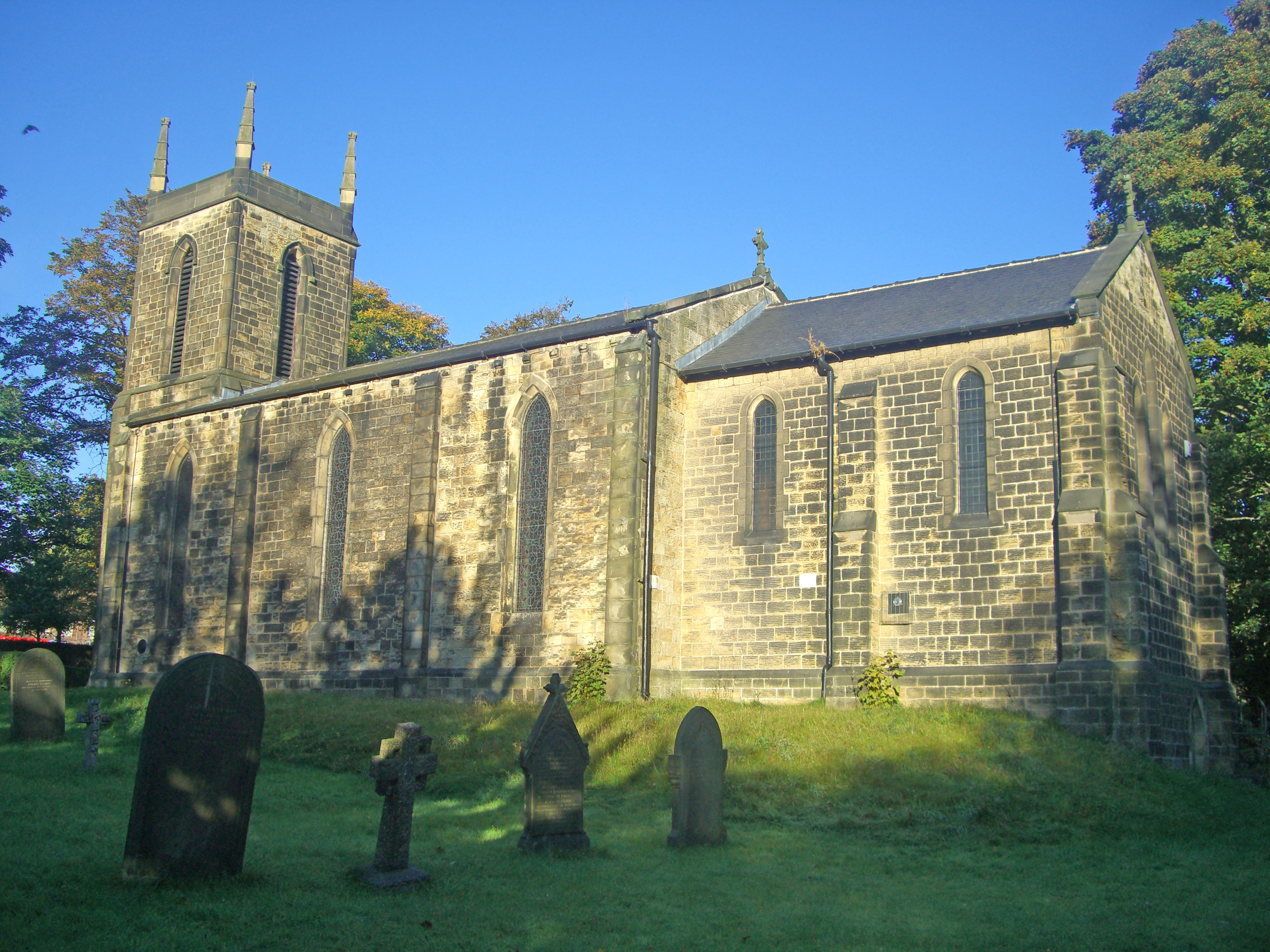
Christ Church

Commonside farmhouse is a grade two listed building situated just off Gleadless Common. The building dates from around 1800 and was originally a pair of cottages before being converted into a farmhouse. In recent years the building has undergone a complete renovation including new roof, windows and doors and has been integrated into a new small housing development known as Commonside Croft. Christ Church on Hollinsend Road is also grade II listed, it dates from 1839 and includes a three-stage tower, the interior features a chancel which is used as a meeting room. Christ Church has a daughter church in the area, St Peter's on White Lane serves the Basegreen district of the suburb. Other places of worship in the area are the Gleadless Methodist Church and Gleadless United Reformed Church. The war memorial and its enclosing wall on Hollinsend Road is grade II listed it features a life size sandstone figure of a soldier with a rifle.
