= Bill Newton Dunn =

British politician (born 1941)

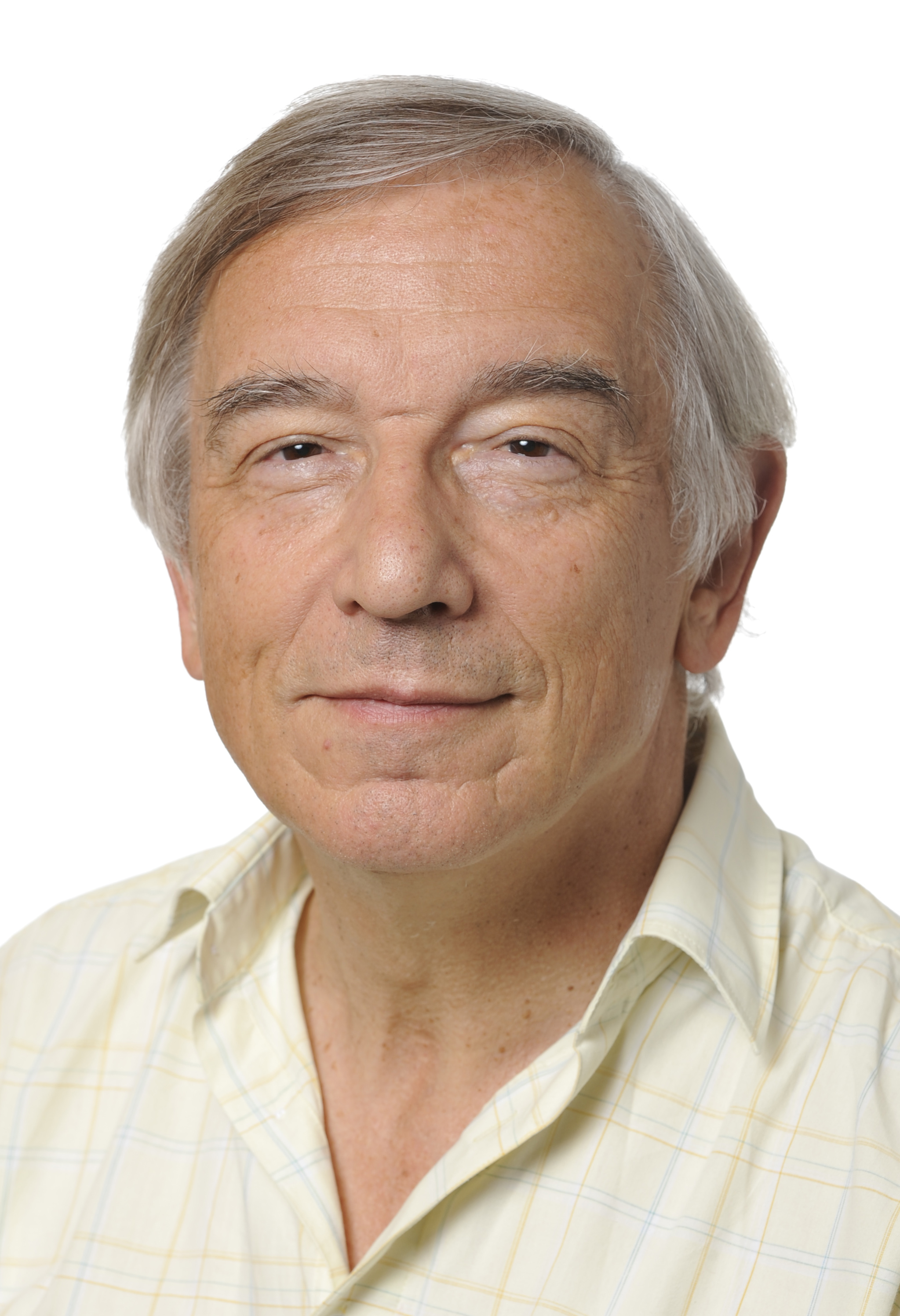
- Official MEP portrait, 2009

Member of the European Parliament
- In office 2 July 2019 – 31 January 2020
- Preceded by: Rupert Matthews
- Succeeded by: Constituency abolished
- Constituency: East Midlands
- In office 1 May 1999 – 2 July 2014
- Preceded by: Position established
- Succeeded by: Andrew Lewer
- Constituency: East Midlands
- In office 7 June 1979 – 9 June 1994
- Preceded by: Position established
- Succeeded by: Veronica Hardstaff
- Constituency: Lincolnshire

Personal details
- Born: 3 October 1941 (age 84) Greywell, Hampshire, England
- Party: Liberal Democrat
- Other political affiliations: Conservative (until 2000)
- Spouse: Anna Terez Árki
- Children: Tom Newton Dunn; Daisy Newton Dunn
- Education: Marlborough College
- Alma mater: Gonville and Caius College, Cambridge; INSEAD

William Francis Newton Dunn (born 3 October 1941) is a British politician who served as a Member of the European Parliament (MEP) from 1979 to 1994, 1999 to 2014 and again from 2019 until the UK's withdrawal from the EU in 2020. He resigned from the Conservative Party in 2000 in protest of its euroscepticism and joined the Liberal Democrats.

Newton Dunn first represented Lincolnshire as an MEP (1979–1994), then the East Midlands (1999–2014; 2019–2020).

== Early life ==
His mother, Barbara Mary Brooke, from Hampshire, was the daughter of Francis Brooke (cricketer, born 1884). His parents married on 23 September 1939 in Hampshire.

He was born at Greywell, Hampshire, son of Lieutenant-Colonel Owen Frank Newton Dunn, OBE and Barbara née Brooke.

He grew up in North Warnborough in Hampshire. He was educated at Marlborough College, Wiltshire from 1955 to 1959. After going up to read Natural Sciences (Physics and Chemistry) at Gonville and Caius College, Cambridge, he studied at Paris-Sorbonne in 1960, and graduated MA (Cantab) in 1963. He then received a tri-lingual MBA from the INSEAD Business school at Fontainebleau, where he studied from 1965 to 1966.

From 1963 to 1979, he worked in industry in the United Kingdom. He worked for Fisons in Suffolk from 1974, in the purchasing division until February 1979.

== Parliamentary career ==
Newton Dunn contested Carmarthen at the February 1974 general election.

He was Conservative Party MEP for Lincolnshire from 1979 to 1994, during which time most European Parliament constituencies in the UK were single-member and the MEPs therein were elected by the first-past-the-post system. He stood for the new seat of Lincolnshire and Humberside South in 1994, but lost to Labour candidate Veronica Hardstaff by 83,172 votes (42.4%) to 69,427 (35.4%).

After a spell out of parliament, Newton Dunn was re-elected a Conservative MEP for the East Midlands in 1999, after the UK adopted systems of proportional representation generally rather than merely for Northern Ireland. He crossed the floor to the Liberal Democrats in 2000 because he felt that the Conservatives were increasingly negative towards the prospect of Britain playing a leading and positive role in Europe.

He was elected as a Liberal Democrat MEP for the first time in the 2004 election. He said he had the highest attendance record of all the UK MEPs when elected. He was re-elected in 2009.

Newton Dunn began to use the now much-used phrase "democratic deficit" in his pamphlet in the 1980s. This phrase first appeared in the manifesto of the Young European Federalists adopted at their congress in Berlin in 1977 (drafted by the future Labour MEP Richard Corbett).

In 2010, Newton Dunn signed the Spinelli Group manifesto in favour of a Federal Europe.

On 4 July 2012, he was the only British MEP to vote in favour of the Anti-Counterfeiting Trade Agreement (ACTA). Only 38 MEPs voted with him, while 478 voted against the treaty; this was the biggest defeat in the history of the European Union.

He stood for re-election in the 2014 election but was defeated.

Newton Dunn was Liberal Democrat parliamentary candidate in Hayes and Harlington in the June 2017 general election. In May 2018, he was elected to Richmond London Borough Council as a councillor for the South Richmond ward.

In the 2019 European Parliament election, Newton Dunn was first on the Liberal Democrat list for the East Midlands and was elected.

At the beginning of the Ninth European Parliament, he was the longest serving MEP (discounting periods outside Parliament) and the only MEP from the First European Parliament in 1979 (40 years previously) still holding a seat.

== Personal life ==
In August 1970, Newton Dunn married Anna Terez Árki, and lived in Dedham, Essex. His wife was a programme researcher for Thames Television, originally from Hungary.

They have two children: Tom Newton Dunn, former political editor of The Sun newspaper and Daisy Newton Dunn, a TV producer for the BBC.

His sister Angela married the son of Conservative MP Gresham Cooke, from Stratfield Turgis in north Hampshire, in September 1971. Angela's husband's older brother is the father of George Monbiot.

He and his wife divide their time between homes in Navenby, Lincolnshire, and Richmond, South West London.

Newton Dunn is a Freeman of the City of London and a Liveryman of the Haberdashers' Company.

European Parliament
New constituency	Member of European Parliament for Lincolnshire; 1979–1994	Succeeded by Veronica Hardstaff for Lincolnshire and Humberside South
New constituency	Member of European Parliament for East Midlands; 1999–2014	Succeeded by Andrew Lewer
Preceded by Rupert Matthews	Member of European Parliament for East Midlands; 2019	Took office 2 July 2019
