= Birley Hay =

Hamlet in Derbyshire, England

Coordinates: 53.318914°N 1.403535°W

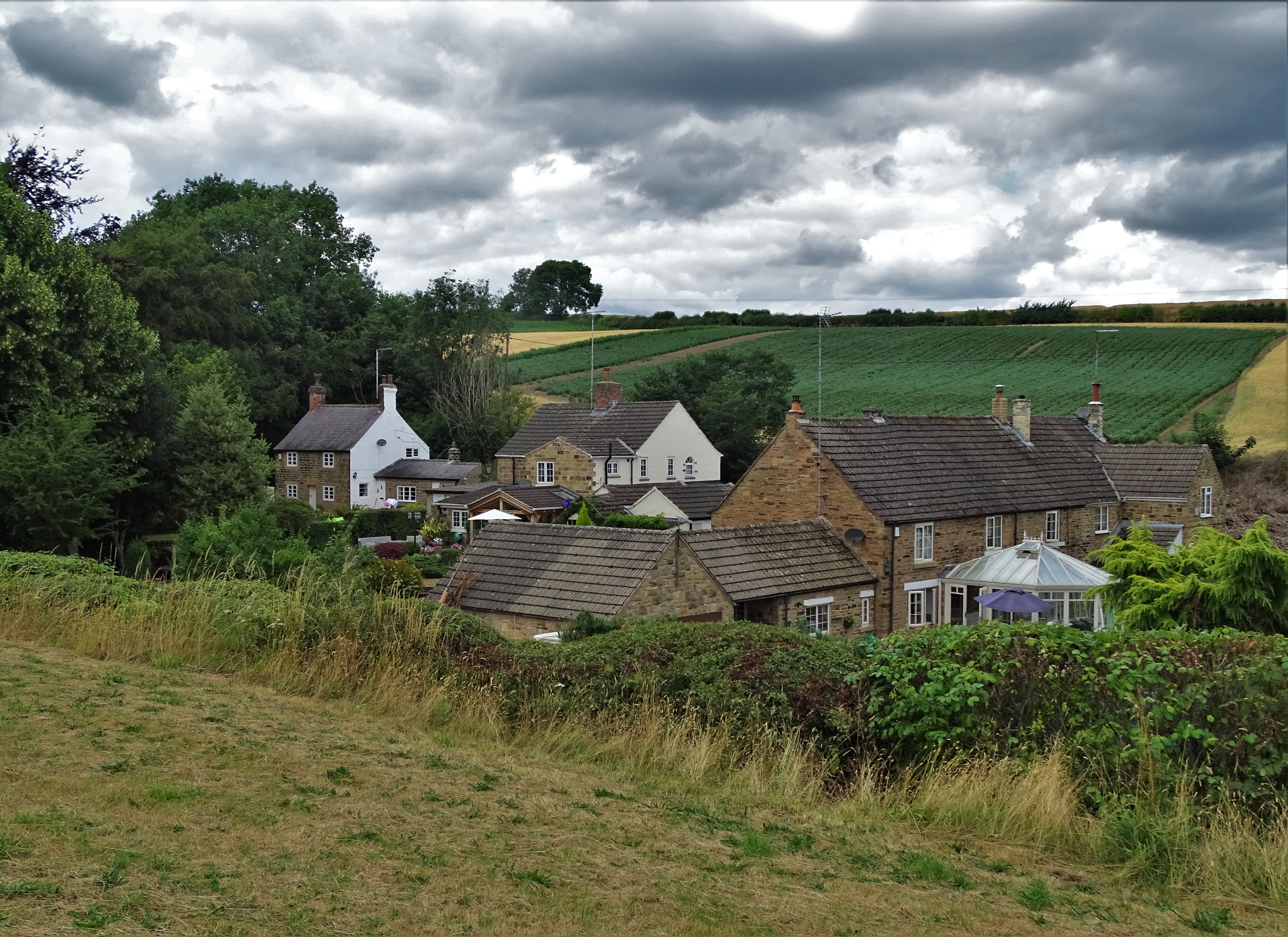
- Birley Hay

- Location within Derbyshire
- District: North East Derbyshire
- Shire county: Derbyshire
- Region: East Midlands
- Country: England
- Sovereign state: United Kingdom
- Post town: SHEFFIELD
- Postcode district: S12
- Police: Derbyshire
- Fire: Derbyshire
- Ambulance: East Midlands

Birley Hay is a hamlet in North East Derbyshire in the county of Derbyshire in England.

== Location ==
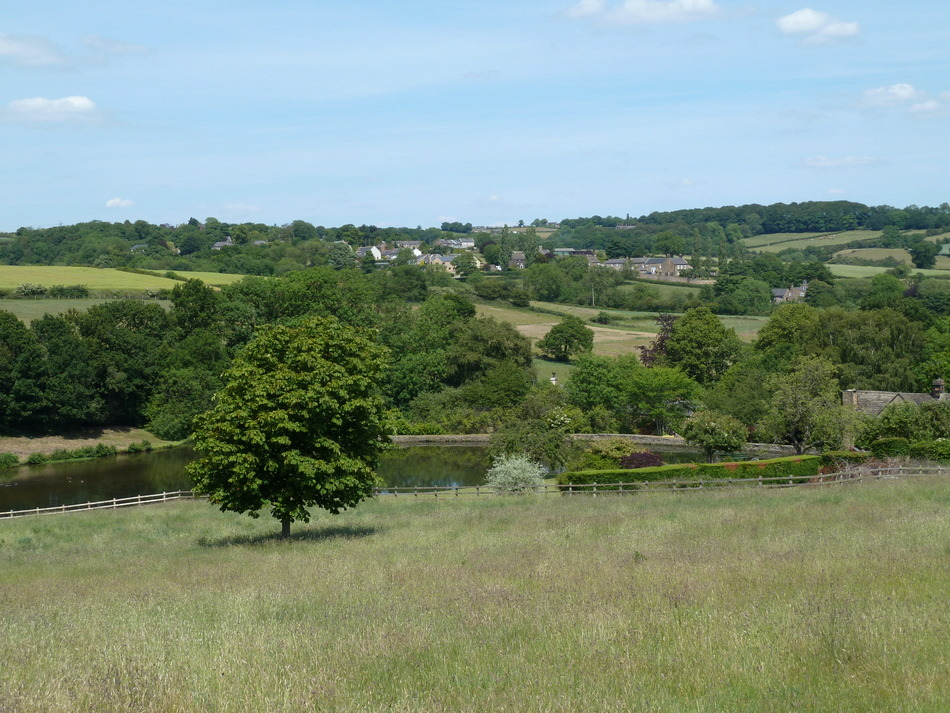
Valley view

Birley Hay lies just south of the South Yorkshire border, around 5 miles south-east of Sheffield City Centre, and just a mile south of the village of Ridgeway

== History ==
The hamlet alongside Ridgeway village is estimated to be around 700-800 years old, and would once have been part of Sherwood Forest.

Birley Hay was associated largely with the sickle smithing trade in the area, with a large grinding wheel existing on The Moss.

Today Birley Hay and the nearby hamlet of Ford, Derbyshire are considered to be part of Ridgeway, Derbyshire however this only seems to be the case for the last century, as the hamlets are clearly displayed on survey maps from the late 1800s.

Most of the buildings in the hamlet are Grade-II listed, this includes Birley Hay Farmhouses.

== See also ==
- Listed buildings in Eckington, Derbyshire
