= The Birley Academy =

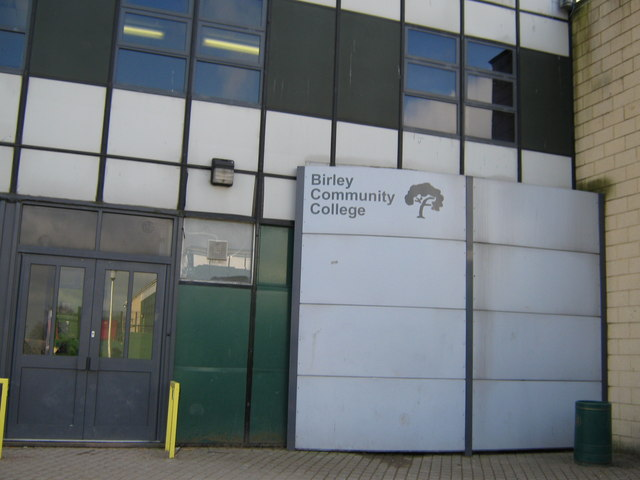
- Entrance to the school (2009)

Location
- Birley Lane; Sheffield, South Yorkshire, S12 3BP; England
- 53.3425°N 1.4020°W

Information
- Type: Academy
- Local authority: City of Sheffield
- Department for Education URN: 143963 Tables
- Ofsted: Reports
- Headteacher: Victoria Hall
- Gender: Co-educational
- Age: 11 to 16
- Enrolment: c. 1,200
- Public transport: B Birley Lane
- Website: http://www.birleysecondaryacademy.co.uk/

The Birley Academy, previously known as Birley Community College, is a secondary school in Birley, Sheffield, South Yorkshire, England. It is part of the L.E.A.D. Academy trust. The headteacher is Victoria Hall.

== Special needs provision ==
The school has dedicated special needs provisions, with a pastoral care department, and a separate section of the school, the Interactive Resources Unit, aiming to assist children with learning difficulties in accessing mainstream education.

== Available GCSE Courses ==
Courses available at Birley are: Maths, English, Science (combined and separate), Food Preparation and Nutrition, Graphics, Creative iMedia, Art, Music, Drama, History, BTEC Sport Science, BTEC Travel and Tourism, Geography, BTEC Engineering, GCSE French and Resistant Materials.

== History ==
=== Thornbridge School ===
It is the former Thornbridge School, the former Thornbridge Grammar School also known as Birley Thornbridge Grammar School. The first headmaster of Thornbridge Comprehensive School was Walter Snook.

=== Birley School ===
The school has connections with the village of Pwani Mchangani, Zanzibar.

Birley Secondary Modern School existed throughout the 1960s.

In 2012 work began to demolish the old building and replace it with a new modern one. The construction of the new building finished in early January of the same year.

The site is off the A6135 (former A616) in south-east Sheffield, north of Birley Lane tram stop.

In 2017 it was granted academy status and became part of the LEAD Academy trust alongside three local feeder schools as well as two other secondary schools.

== Notable former pupils ==
=== Thornbridge Grammar School ===
- Phil Burgan - racing driver and businessman
- Tommy Eyre - Musician

=== Birley Community College ===
- Regan Slater - Professional footballer. (Midfielder)

== Former teachers ==
- Veronica Hardstaff from 1986 to 1994 she taught French and German, Labour MEP from 1994 to 1999 for Lincolnshire and Humberside South (the only MEP it had), and married to Alan Billings, the South Yorkshire Police and Crime Commissioner since 2016

== See also ==
- Totley-Thornbridge College of Education also known as Totley Hall College of Education, which became part of Sheffield City Polytechnic in 1976
