= Eckington Mine =

Mine in the United Kingdom

Coordinates: 53.31252°N 1.34345°W

Eckington mine was a drift mine situated on the eastern edge of the township of Eckington, Derbyshire, England, 7 miles (11 km) South-West of Sheffield. As of 2011, it was the only colliery in production in North East Derbyshire.

The mine was operated by Eckington Colliery Partnership during whose ownership it produced 25,739 metric tons (25,739,000 kg). In the 12 months leading to March 2007, the workforce was 26. The mine subsequently passed under the ownership of Moorside Mining Co. Ltd.

== History ==
Planning permission for Eckington Mine was granted in 1992, and allowed the company to extract 0.74 million tonnes of coal from a seam which covered some 166 acres (67 ha). The mine began operating in 1993. It consisted of two drifts, which extracted coal from the Eckington Deep Soft (Flockton) Seam. In 1999, planning permission was given to extract an additional 15,000 tonnes of coal from an area of 3.7 acres (1.5 ha) to the north of the original planning consent. The coal was supplied to the Ratcliffe-on-Soar Power Station. A review of the mine in 2013 led to it being granted a 10-year extension, because it was unlikely that it would cause an further environmental damage. The mine workings are located above deeper historic workings of the Parkgate Seam, which is 213 feet (65 m) below it, and the Thorncliffe Seam which is 260 feet (80 m) below.

The mine was started by Moorside Mining Company, and had a good safety record for the first five years, but part of the roof collapsed in 1998, killing two miners and injuring a third. The collapse took place some 2,630 feet (800 m) from the entrance. The mine continued to be run by Moorside Mining, but by 2013 was run by Caledonian Coal Company. Ownership had passed to John Baker Barnett Ltd by 2015 and to European Coal Products by 2017.

It closed unexpectedly in January 2019. After closure, the site was inspected by the Coal Authority, to ensure that it would remain safe. The two roadways that entered the mine pass beneath the London to Sheffield railway line, and work was carried out to ensure that this route would not be compromised by future subsidence. The work began shortly after closure, because the mine contained underground springs, and with the pumps switched off, water levels were rising quickly. Reinforced concrete blockwork was used to construct walls across both roadways some 460 feet (140 m) from the entrance. Foamed concrete was then pumped into the shafts, which rested against the walls because of the steep angle of the shafts. A total of 260 feet (80 m) of the shaft was filled in this way, in stages so that the weight of the concrete would not destroy the retaining walls. Normal practice would be to use waste material from the mine to pack the shafts, but because the mine was worked by a pillar and stall method, there was no suitable material on the surface. Around 1,300 cubic yards (990 m^{3}) of concrete was used. Once the concrete had set, the roadways were closed off by digging out the entrances, and reprofiling the land. The project took 13 week to complete, and ended in June 2020.

== Bibliography ==
- Ashworth, Mike (6 March 2017). "Regulatory - Planning Committee" (PDF). Derbyshire County Council. Archived (PDF) from the original on 14 May 2021.
