= Birley =

Electoral ward in the City of Sheffield, South Yorkshire, England

Coordinates: 53.345°N 1.394°W

- Location in Sheffield
- Population: 16,943 (2011 census)
- Metropolitan borough: City of Sheffield
- Metropolitan county: South Yorkshire
- Region: Yorkshire and the Humber
- Country: England
- Sovereign state: United Kingdom
- UK Parliament: Sheffield South East
- Councillors: Matt Dwyer (Labour Party); Karen McGowan (Labour Party); Denise Fox (Independent)

Birley ward — which includes the area of Frecheville, and parts of Gleadless and Hackenthorpe — is one of the 28 electoral wards in City of Sheffield, England. It is located in the southeastern part of the city and covers an area of 5.1 square kilometres (2 sq mi). The population of this ward in 2011 was 16,943 people in 7,393 households. It is one of the five wards that make up the Sheffield South East constituency.

== Frecheville ==
=== Origins ===
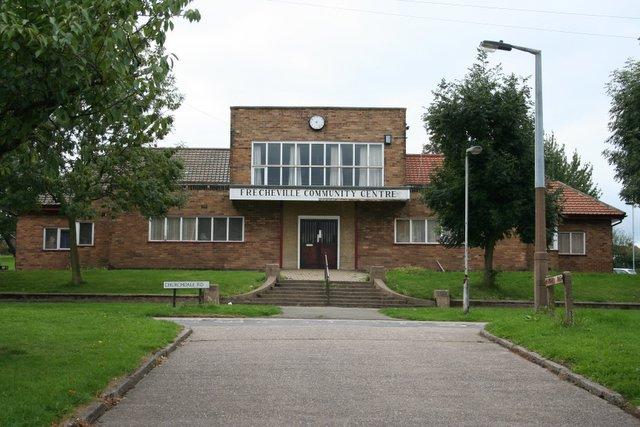
Frecheville Community Centre

Frecheville (grid reference SK398838) is a housing estate to the north of Birley Estate developed in the 1930s by Henry Boot Limited. The firm constructed around 1,600 private houses, mainly traditional brick built 2 or 3 bedroom semi-detached family homes for rent and gave the Frecheville estate its name. A local pub's signboard shows the coat of arms of the Frecheville family, who were lords of the manor at Staveley but there is no evidence that the Frechevilles ever owned land on Birley Moor, so the name given to Frecheville remains something of a mystery.

Frecheville was historically in Derbyshire, until 1967.

Frecheville is home to the well-known Frecheville Pond, with ducks, swans, and fishing, and also houses the parish church, library, and community centre provided for the neighbourhood by the builder which still has an active forum, and has run the Frecheville carnival every year between 1937 and 2006 with the exception of during the war years. The majority of homes on the estate are now owner-occupied after being handed over to residents in the 1950s.

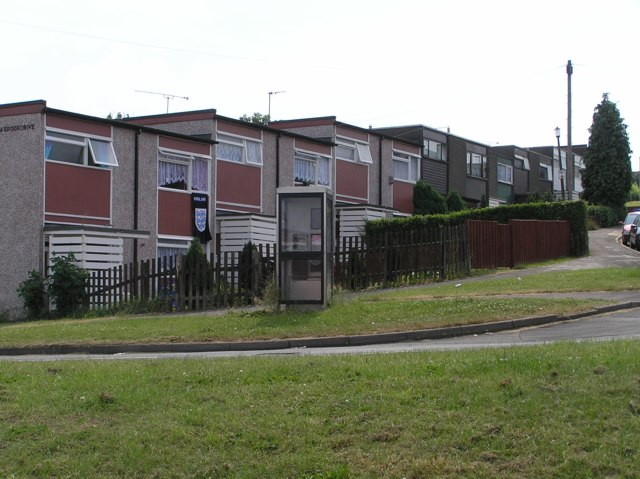
Long since demolished council housing on the Scowerdons estate.

=== Birley ===
Birley Estate (grid reference SK402830) is a housing estate in the southeastern part of Sheffield. It is built on what was Birley Moor just to the north of the small hamlet of Birley. Birley Spa to the northeast was a hotel and spa built in 1842 around a spring of mineral water. The building was restored in 2001/02 and is Grade II listed.

The original hamlet featured farmland and farm buildings, most of which are now used to house the Birley Wood Golf Club.

== Gleadless ==
=== Base Green ===
Base Green (grid reference SK390833) is a housing estate to the west of Frecheville and east of Gleadless Townend. It is built on the land that was formerly Basegreen Farm, with the remains of an old orchard still evident within the playing fields of what is now Jaunty Park.

What was Base Green Junior School, for pupils in between Frecheville Infant School and Frecheville Comprehensive School, is now housing.

Quarry Vale Road and Quarry Vale Grove sit behind what was once a quarry, along the ancient border of the Shire Brook. The hill above Quarry Vale Road and Quarry Vale Grove used to be Frecheville Comprehensive School and its extensive school fields, where Manchester United footballer George Best once filmed a series of short football programmes for BBC TV.

=== Charnock ===
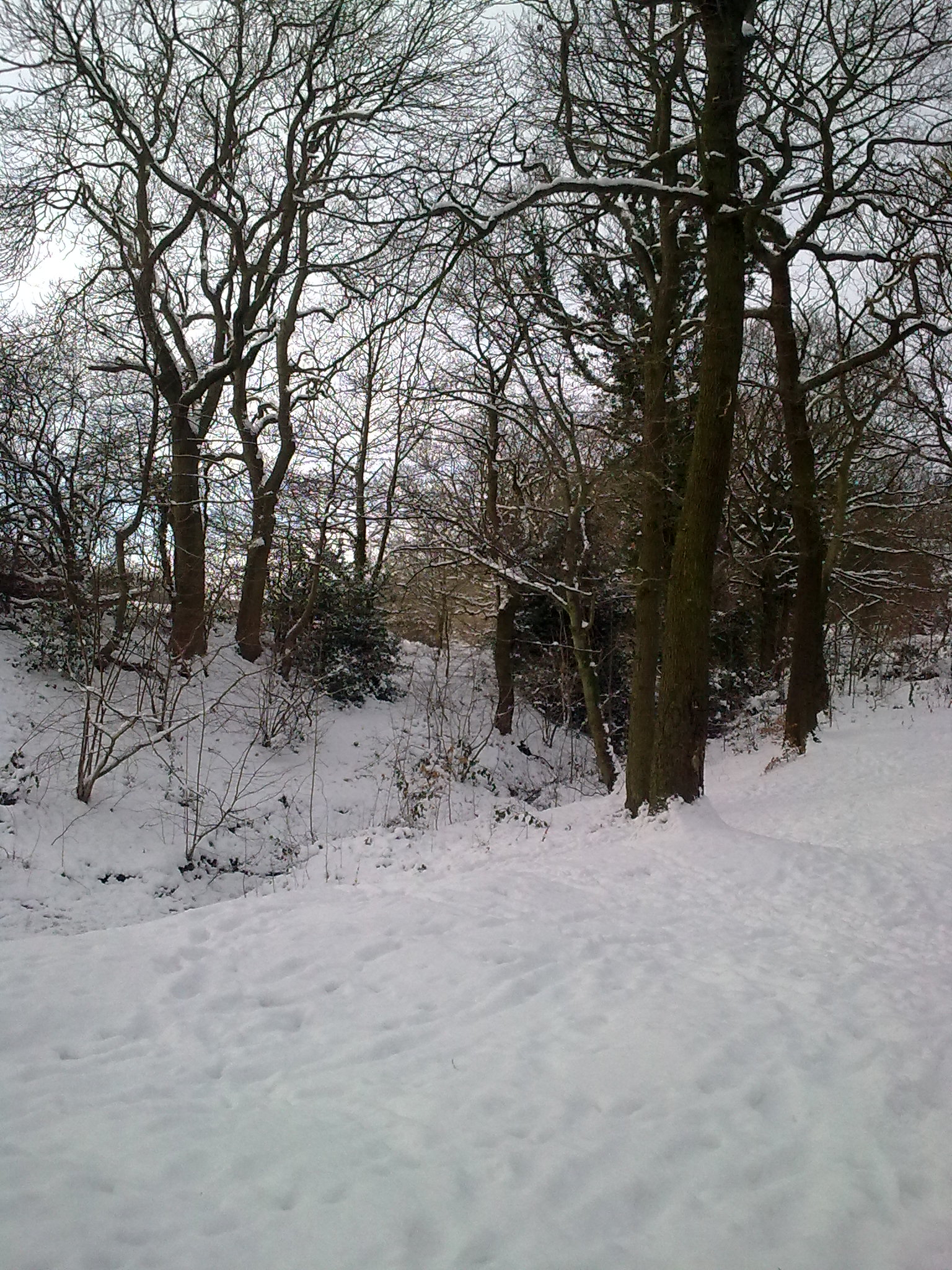
The Stoneley Woods, an ancient woodland in Charnock, during the Early 2010 Big Freeze (January 2010).

Charnock (sometimes called Charnock Hall) (grid reference SK384828) is a housing estate to the south of Basegreen. The estate was built on the former Charnockhall Farm which stood where Farm Close is today.

== Hackenthorpe ==
Most of Hackenthorpe (down the hill from Birley Moor Road) is in the Beighton ward. The significant historic site here is Birley Spa.
