= Lincolnshire and Humberside South (European Parliament constituency) =

Former European Parliament constituency

- European Parliament constituency
- Boundary within the East Midlands (1994-1999)
- Member state: United Kingdom
- Created: 1994
- Dissolved: 1999
- MEPs: 1

Prior to its uniform adoption of proportional representation in 1999, the United Kingdom used first-past-the-post for the European elections in England, Scotland and Wales. The European Parliament constituencies used under that system were smaller than the later regional constituencies and only had one Member of the European Parliament each.

The constituency of Lincolnshire and Humberside South was one of them.

It consisted of the Westminster Parliament constituencies (on their 1983 boundaries) of Brigg and Cleethorpes, East Lindsey, Gainsborough and Horncastle, Grantham, Great Grimsby, Holland with Boston, and Lincoln.

== MEPs ==
Election	Member	Party
1994	Veronica Hardstaff	Labour
1999	Constituency abolished: see East Midlands	

== Election results ==
European Parliament election, 1994: Lincolnshire and Humberside South
Party	Candidate	Votes	%	±%
Labour	Veronica Hardstaff	83,172	42.4	
Conservative	Bill Newton Dunn	69,427	35.4	
Liberal Democrats	Keith M. Melton	27,241	13.9	
Green	Miss Rosemary E. Robinson	8,563	4.4	
Liberal	M.E. (Edwin) Wheeler	3,434	1.8	
Network against the Child Support Agency	Ian E. Selby	2,973	1.5	
Natural Law	Hugh W. Kelly	1,129	0.6	
Majority		13,745	7.0	
Turnout		195,939		
Labour win (new seat)				
