= Ford, Derbyshire =

Hamlet in Derbyshire, England

Coordinates: 53.331°N 1.397°W

Ford
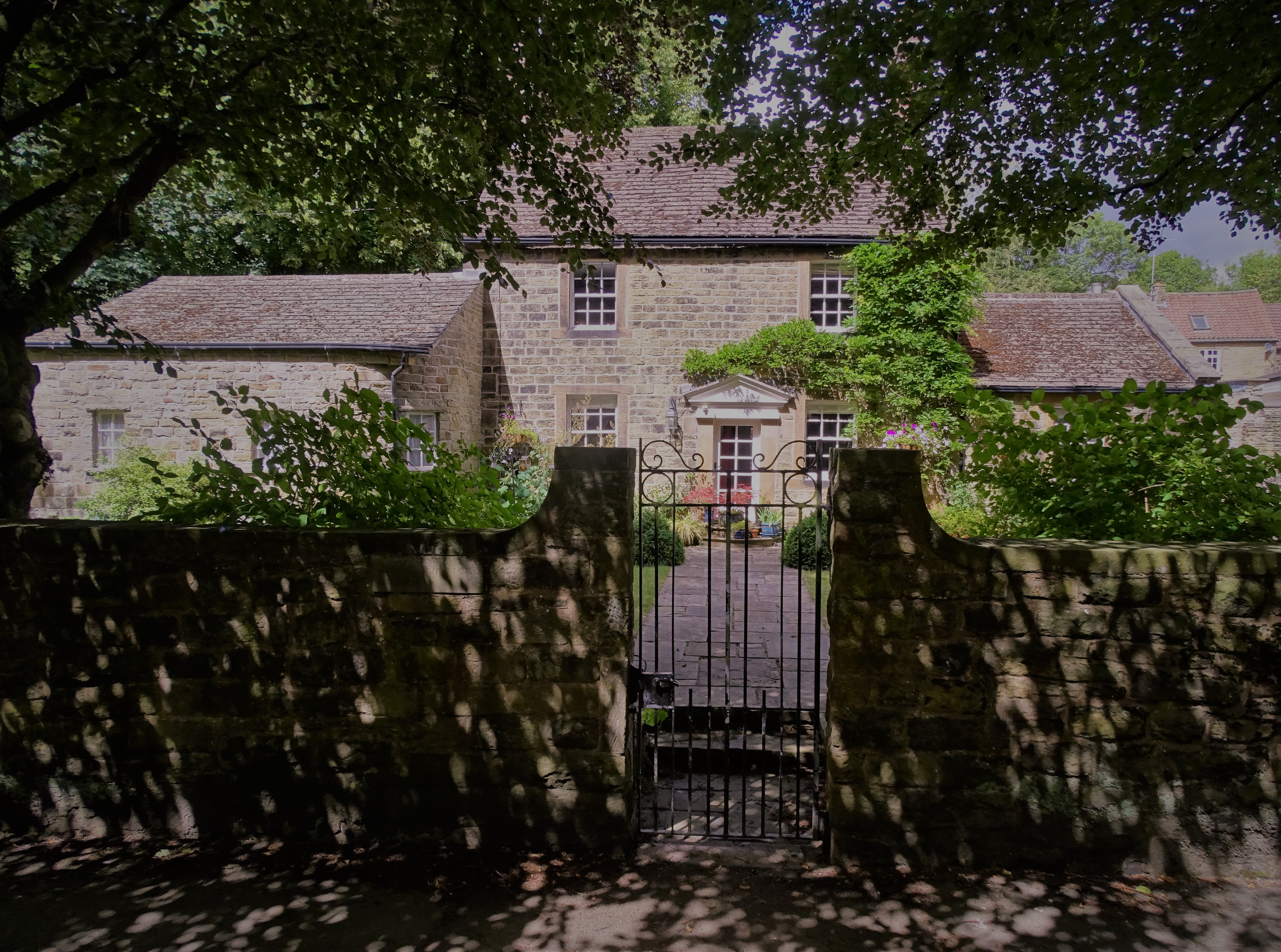
- House in Ford

- Location within Derbyshire
- District: North East Derbyshire
- Shire county: Derbyshire
- Region: East Midlands
- Country: England
- Sovereign state: United Kingdom
- Post town: SHEFFIELD
- Postcode district: S12
- Police: Derbyshire
- Fire: Derbyshire
- Ambulance: East Midlands

Ford is a hamlet in North East Derbyshire in the county of Derbyshire in England.

== Location ==
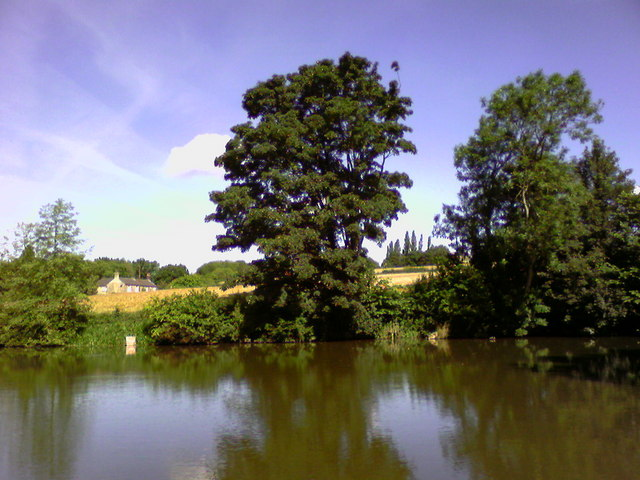
Ford Dam

Ford is just south of the South Yorkshire border, around five miles south-east of Sheffield City Centre, and a mile south of the village of Ridgeway. There is a dam there.

== History ==
The hamlet alongside Ridgeway village is estimated to be around 700–800 years old, and would once have been part of Sherwood Forest.

The Ford Farm building is estimated to have been built around 1750, and is grade-II listed.

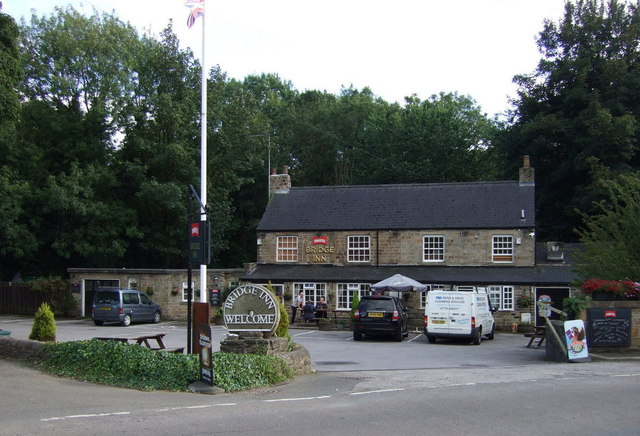
The Bridge Inn

The Bridge Inn pub was opened in 1854, and continues to operate in the hamlet.

The hamlet of Birley Hay which lies to the west of Ford has s a number of listed buildings and farm outhouses.
