= Rother Vale Collieries =

Former collieries in South Yorkshire, England

Coordinates: 53.367°N 1.356°W

Rother Vale Collieries were a group of coal producing pits originally in the Rother Valley parishes of Treeton, Woodhouse and Orgreave, nowadays on the south east Sheffield / Rotherham boundary, in South Yorkshire, England. In the early 20th century, a new colliery at Thurcroft was developed.

The Fence Colliery Company was formed in 1862 with the purchase of Fence Colliery, a small coal pit sunk alongside the main Sheffield to Worksop road at the lower end of the village of Fence. This pit had already been in operation for over 20 years and under new ownership was considerably developed. It closed as a coal producing unit in 1904, coal from its reserves being brought to the surface at Orgreave, but it was retained as a pumping station and later became the National Coal Board's workshops, finally closing in the 1990s.

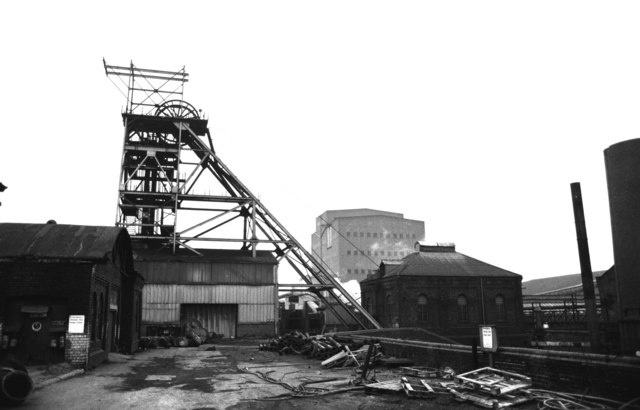
Orgreave Colliery (1982)

Orgreave Colliery, then a small concern, was bought by the company in 1870. It was situated less than a mile from Fence, adjacent to the main line of the Manchester, Sheffield and Lincolnshire Railway, to the west of Woodhouse. It was joined to this railway by a steeply graded but short branch line.

Five years after the purchase of Orgreave colliery the company changed its name and became Rother Vale Collieries Limited extending its empire just two years on with the sinking of a new pit at Treeton. A railway branch was constructed by well-known contractors Logan and Hemingway between Orgreave and Treeton to link the collieries to the Midland Railway at Treeton. In order to gain a foothold in the traffic at Treeton the M.S.& L.R. gained authorisation for a branch line, unusually, under its "Extension to London" Act, 1893. This opened for traffic, including the Paddy Mail, on 10 October 1898.

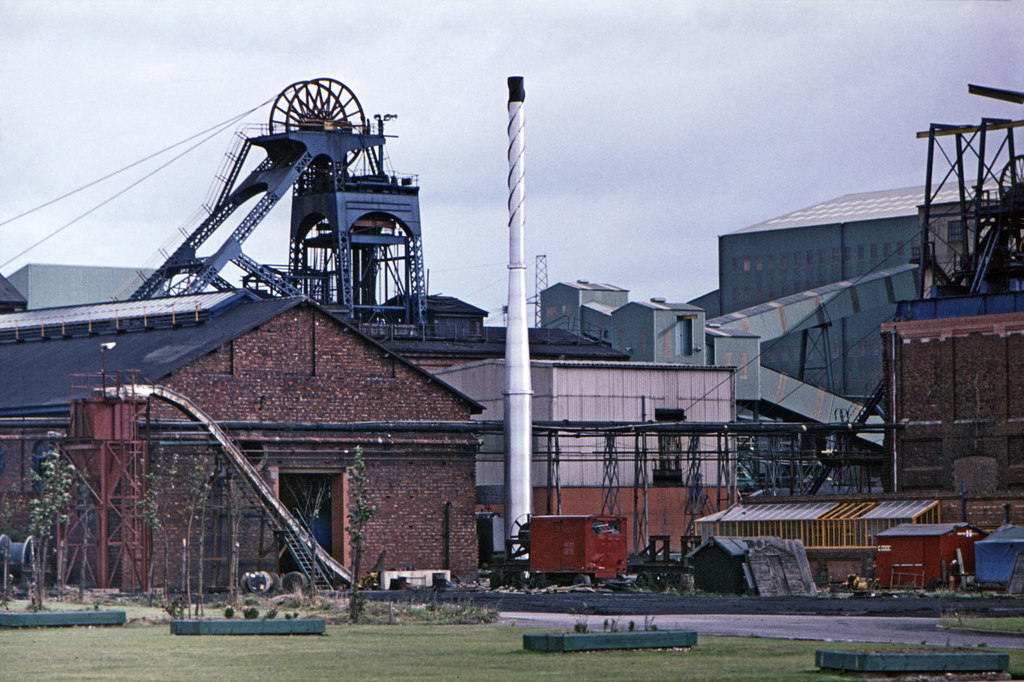
Thurcroft Colliery (1977)

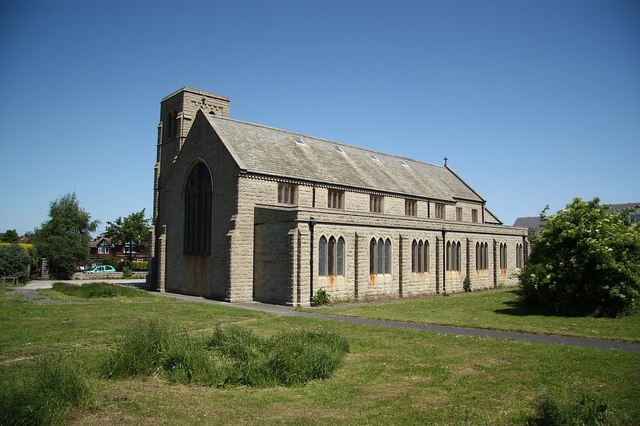
Church built for Rother Vale Collieries in Thurcroft

Moving further eastwards the Rother Vale Colliery Company began the sinking of a new colliery at Thurcroft in 1909. Although the Barnsley seam was reached in 1913, extraction became difficult. The point of sinking was situated over a large geological fault which had thrown the coal out of its normal position.

In 1918 the United Steel Companies was formed and the following year, along with steel making interests in South Yorkshire and Lincolnshire, Rother Vale Collieries became part of the group.

== Sources ==
- Various Issues : Steel News, the newspaper of the United Steel Companies Limited.
- Great Central, Vol. 3. "Fay sets the pace", George Dow, Locomotive Publishing Co., London 1969
