= Orgreave =

Orgreave may refer to:

- Orgreave, South Yorkshire, a village and civil parish in England
  - Orgreave Colliery, a former coal mine (which also supplied the Orgreave coking works)
  - Battle of Orgreave, a violent confrontation in 1984 between police and pickets
- Orgreave, Staffordshire, a hamlet in England

== See also ==
- Orgreave Colliery platform
- Orgreave rail accident
