= Waverley, South Yorkshire =

Coordinates: 53.3828°N 1.3730°W

Waverley
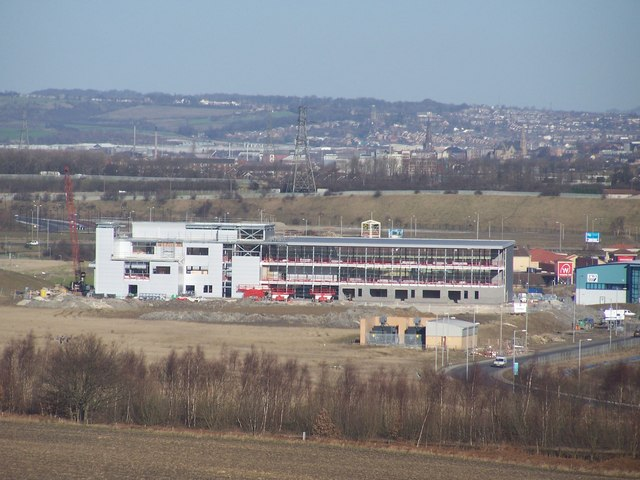
- Waverley Advanced Manufacturing Park

- Location within South Yorkshire
- OS grid reference: SK416875
- Metropolitan borough: Rotherham
- Metropolitan county: South Yorkshire
- Region: Yorkshire and the Humber
- Country: England
- Sovereign state: United Kingdom
- Post town: ROTHERHAM
- Postcode district: S60 8
- Dialling code: 01709
- Police: South Yorkshire
- Fire: South Yorkshire
- Ambulance: Yorkshire
- UK Parliament: Rotherham; Rother Valley

Waverley is a civil parish in the Metropolitan Borough of Rotherham in the southeastern part of the county of South Yorkshire, England. It is situated about 140 miles (230 km) north of London, 3.52 miles (5.66 km) from Rotherham town centre and 3.96 miles (6.37 km) from Sheffield City Centre. The parish was formed on 1 April 2019 from parts of the parishes of Catcliffe and Orgreave.

== History ==
Waverley sits upon the former Orgreave Colliery, which operated between 1851 and 1990. Here was the site of the 1984 Battle of Orgreave. Between 1995 and 2005, the area was used for opencast mining. Following the closure of the mine, the landowner, Harworth Group, began to redevelop the site. The name Waverley was chosen after the Waverley Coal Company which had operated nearby in the 1900s. Some have accused the group of whitewashing by burying the name Orgreave. The Advanced Manufacturing Park opened in 2004. Houses were then built, with around 2,000 extant by 2026.

== Transportation ==
The nearest railway station to the parish is Woodhouse, located approximately two miles away. A railway station is proposed on the Sheffield–Lincoln line which is adjacent to the parish. In 2020, the government announced that it would provide funding for a feasibility study, as part of the Restoring Your Railway scheme. The station would be intermediate between Darnall to the west and Woodhouse to the south-east.

The bus route 95, operated by First, links Waverley between Rotherham Interchange , Sheffield Interchange and Walkley, whilst the X11, also operated by First, links Waverley between Sheffield Interchange and Doncaster Frenchgate Interchange via Rotherham District General Hospital, Maltby, and Tickhill. The 70(A), operated by TM Travel, offers a direct connection to Meadowhall, as does the 70a by First. The nearby secondary school Aston Academy is also linked with Waverley with the 629 and 655 operated by Keats Travel of Sheffield, and once daily on weekdays with the 71s operated by TM Travel.

== Governance ==
Waverley Community Council is the first tier of local government and is primarily responsible for public open spaces, the upkeep of roadside verges, the maintenance of publicly accessible defibrillators, and for the local community centre "The Hub". All other local services are provided by Rotherham Metropolitan Borough Council.

For Westminster elections, the parish falls within the Rotherham parliamentary constituency.
