= High Hazels Colliery =

Former coal mine in South Yorkshire, England

Coordinates: 53.3849°N 1.3866°W

High Hazels Colliery was a coal mine situated between the parish of Catcliffe, near Rotherham, and the parish of Handsworth, near Sheffield. It was adjacent to the main line of the Manchester, Sheffield and Lincolnshire Railway between the stations of Darnall and Woodhouse.

The original colliery was owned by Thomas Coupland Hounsfield, a merchant who, until 1900, lived in Paris. In that year he leased the colliery to the Waverley Coal Company, who were already working Nunnery Colliery nearer to the city centre. The pit was small, with, in 1896, only 123 workers. High Hazels No.3 pit was the easternmost colliery of the Waverley group and situated slightly to the east of the other shafts.

In 1947, on nationalisation, the colliery became part of the National Coal Board.

The site was also home to coke ovens and by-products plant which was served by a 28" gauge railway on which operated 3 locomotives:

- The first two locomotives were products of Yorkshire Engine Company and were a four-coupled side tank design, Works No's. 546, built in 1897 and 898, built in 1906.
- The third locomotive was built by Black, Hawthorn & Company, a four-coupled saddle tank locomotive, Works No. 591, built in 1901.

The locomotives and system were cut up when the coke ovens closed.

- Standard gauge locomotives are listed with others owned by the Waverley Coal Company and are listed on the Nunnery Colliery entry.
