= Steetley Colliery =

British former colliery

- Location in Nottinghamshire
- Location: Nottinghamshire/Derbyshire border, Nottinghamshire, England; 53°18′2″N 1°10′24″W
- Products: Coal
- Opened: 1876
- Closed: 1983
- Company: Shireoaks Colliery Company; British Coal

Steetley Colliery is a former colliery on the Derbyshire/Nottinghamshire border.

== History ==
The Duke of Newcastle owned mineral rights in much of north Nottinghamshire and north-east Derbyshire. After a seam of coal had been reached at Shireoaks in February 1859, the Shireoaks Colliery Company was formed, and was formally registered in December 1864. They began acquiring mining interests throughout the area, including Whitwell, Clowne and Steetley, where the sinking of a shaft began in May 1873. The miners reached a seam of coal in December 1875, and this created a turning point in the history of Worksop: from an agricultural town to an industrial powerhouse, boosting its population and creating a prosperous future.

Steetley only had a single shaft, which made ventilation difficult. Shireoaks Colliery Company continued to expand their operations, and began sinking a shaft for Whitwell Colliery on Belph Moor on 24 May 1890. They intended that the two mines would work together, with the Steetley shaft used as the intake or downcast for fresh air, and Whitwell providing the return or uptake. Working 5 1/2 days a week, 22 men working as two teams found coal on 23 October 1891, when they reached the Top Hard seam 933 feet (284 m) below Belph Moor. They continued downwards, and reached the High Hazel seam 390 feet (120 m) below that. From the lower level, a heading was driven towards Steetley, and the ventilation system was established when the two mines were linked in 1894.

A second shaft was built at Whitwell, reaching the Top Hard seam on 15 March 1898. At this point, the ventilation system was altered, with No.1 shaft being the downcast and No.2 shaft being the uptake. Steetley was by then also connected to Shireoaks Colliery, and relied on both Whitwell and Shireoaks for its ventilation.

By 1950, Steetley had one of the most productive coalfaces in the area and was providing employment more than 500 people: over 40% of the total workforce in Worksop. Given its demands on the local labour force and the remoteness of the colliery, the Shireoaks Colliery Company set about establishing new housing for the Steetley workers; the pit village of Rhodesia, Nottinghamshire is one such example.

By 1896, there were 340 underground workers and another 70 working on the surface. The manager was R E Jones, who was also responsible for the neighbouring Whitwell Colliery. Independent numbers for the workforce are not available for 1923, when the Colliery Year Book showed a joint figure for Steetley and Shireoaks, but in 1933, there were 460 men working underground, and the number of surface workers was the same as in 1896. H J Atkinson was the manager in both years, and again, was also responsible for Whitwell. In 1940, the number underground had decreased to 440, but those working on the surface had increased to 80, and Steetley now had its own manager, in J A Barrass. The trend continued in 1947, with a drop to 403 men underground and 83 surface workers. The manager was now L L Harrison, who had previously been the manager at Whitwell in 1940.

At peak production the colliery workforce could produce up to 33,000 tonnes of coal each year. Individual coal seams were used for different purposes: the Top Hard Seam was one of the most famous in the world due to its high commercial value, while the High Hazel Seam, mined from 1956 to 1983, supplied good quality domestic fuel.

=== Nationalisation ===
In 1945, the Shireoaks Colliery Company was sold to United Steel Companies and on nationalisation came under the control of the National Coal Board (NCB). Together with Shireoaks, Steetley Colliery became part of the North East Division Number One Area of the NCB. Both pits were transferred to the South Yorkshire Area in March 1967, and were amalgamated in March 1983. This resulted in the closure of the surface works at Steetley, and all coal was brought up through the Shireoaks shafts. Reorganisation resulted in Shireoaks becoming part of the South Yorkshire Group in April 1990, but this was short-lived, as it closed in May.

By the time the Steetley colliery was sunk, the area was also occupied by several large farms and a limestone quarry that had operated on and off for centuries. The nearby Steetley Chapel, built around 1150, is constructed of local stone from the quarry. Steetley quarry closed in the 1960s.

The colliery site is in the process of being redeveloped by construction company Laing O'Rourke as an industrial complex known as Explore Industrial Park.

== Bibliography ==
- Wain, Ken (2014). The Coal Mining Industry of Barnsley, Rotherham and Worksop. Amberley Publishing. ISBN 978-1-4456-3965-9.
- WLHG (2017). "Whitwell Colliery". Whitwell Local History Group.
