= Orgreave Colliery platform =

Workman's Halt in South Yorkshire, England

General information
- Location: Orgreave Colliery, Rotherham; England
- Coordinates: 53.37917°N 1.36469°W
- Grid reference: SK423871

Other information
- Status: Disused
Location

Orgreave Colliery platform was a workman's halt built to serve the miners working at Orgreave Colliery in South Yorkshire, England. These workmen's trains or "Paddy Mails" were operated between Sheffield Victoria and Treeton Colliery at shift change times being hauled along the main line to Orgreaves Colliery Sidings (the extra 's' being added by the railway in error but never corrected) where the main line locomotive was exchanged for one belonging to the colliery company, usually "Rothervale No.6" which was fitted with vacuum brakes.

The platform was situated almost at the bottom of an incline with a gradient of approx. 1 in 27 (37 ‰) to be climbed to reach the main line with the return trains. It was often the case that the train was reversed a short distance to more level track to give it a run at the gradient and a banking locomotive provided, sometimes on damp days too.

The "Paddy Mails" ceased running in May 1932 due to parts of the bridges between Orgreave and Treeton being washed away when the River Rother flooded. The line was repaired but the "Paddy Mails" were not re-introduced, being replaced by "Pit Buses" operated by Sheffield Corporation along the main routes from the city centre and the local area.

One of the "Paddy Mails" was involved in an accident on 13 December 1926.

== Sources ==
"The Orgreave Paddy Mail Accident", published in Forward, the journal of the Great Central Railway Society. ISSN 0141-4488.

Various issues of "Steel News", the newspaper of British Steel (owners of the coke ovens complex in nationalisation) and "Coal News" the in house newspaper of British Coal.
