= Orgreave rail accident =

1926 railway accident in the UK

Coordinates: 53.367°N 1.359°W

Orgreave Train Collision 1926

Details
- Date: 13 December 1926
- Location: Orgreave Colliery, South Yorkshire
- Country: England, UK
- Line: Great Central Railway
- Cause: Derailment fouled line

Statistics
- Trains: 3
- Passengers: 800
- Deaths: 0
- Injured: 19

The Orgreave Train Collision occurred on 13 December 1926 near Orgreave Colliery signal box on the Great Central Railway line about 4 1/2 miles (7.2 km) east of Sheffield. A goods train had collided with a preceding goods train on the same line, and the wreckage had obstructed the adjacent passenger line.

A workmen's train, known as a paddy mail, ran into the wreckage; paddy mails were workmen's trains operated in connection with all three shift changes at the collieries. These were hauled from Sheffield Victoria, as far as Orgreaves Colliery Sidings by the main line company, using whatever locomotive was available. At this point the colliery's own locomotives took over and in connection with this operation 'Rothervale No.6' was fitted with vacuum brakes. The train then ran to Orgreave Colliery platform and Treeton Colliery.

== Circumstances ==
The line at Orgreaves Colliery (Note: The signal box was named Orgreaves Colliery, with an 's' being added to the name, in error, however the railway company never corrected the mistake and it remained as such until its eventual demise.) was quadruple track, the centre tracks being the Main Lines operated under Absolute Block regulations, and the outer lines were designated Goods Lines, and they were worked under Permissive Block regulations. Whereas the Absolute Block System maintains a space interval between trains to prevent collision, the Permissive Block System permits trains to follow one another into a block section without special protection other than a speed restriction, usually of 4 mph.

At about 5 a.m. on 13 December 1926 the Orgreaves Colliery signalman had the 2.50 a.m. Mexborough to Woodford goods train, consisting of around 40 wagons, mostly empty, standing on the Up Goods Line at his home signal, waiting for clearance forward. He accepted the 1.15 a.m. Dewsnap to Nottingham goods train from Darnall West on the Up Goods Line under the Permissive Block regulations. This train collided with the rear of the stationary Woodford train. The weather was said to be foggy, dense in places. In the collision, a number of empty wagons were derailed and some were thrown foul of the Up Main line.

Just before 5.30 a.m. a workmen's train colloquially referred to as the Orgreave "Paddy Mail" left Sheffield Victoria, and having called at Darnall and running on the Up Main line ran into the wreckage. The workmen's train consisted of 14 assorted elderly vehicles hauled by an ex-G.N.R. "Atlantic" locomotive driven by Fred Bagley of Neepsend engine shed. The train was carrying around 800 miners travelling to their work at collieries.

== Consequences ==
The locomotive of the workmen's train hit the wagons at moderate speed, as the train was slowing to take branch points and the train was brought to a halt within 50 yards; some damage was done to the front coaches. Although there were many minor injuries to the colliers going on shift only 19 miners required the attention of staff at Sheffield Royal Hospital, one being detained with back and thigh injuries, and there were no fatalities.

Many of the uninjured miners from Orgreave left the train and walked along the lines to their pit to start the morning shift, to avoid losing pay for the day. For miners working at Treeton it was too far to walk within the time and many were taken back to Sheffield by the railway.

== Commentary ==
The Absolute Block System was implemented to prevent train collisions by ensuring that only one train could be in any railway route section at one time. The Permissive Block System was used in situations where goods and mineral trains needed to close up to previous trains in congested areas, but it was in general restricted to goods and mineral trains only, and restricted to a speed of 4 mph, and prohibited in foggy conditions. It seems likely that Permissive Block working should not have been in operation at the time of the Orgreaves collision; and that the Nottingham train should have run sufficiently slowly that it did not collide with the stationary train in front.

When the collision took place, the guard of the Nottingham train should have run back down the line, exhibiting a red hand signal to place detonators on both the approaching lines (the Goods Line and the Main Line) to protect the point of the collision.

It is not clear why these mandatory safety measures were not adopted.

== Sources ==
- "The Orgreave Paddy Mail Accident", "Forward", the journal of the Great Central Railway Society. ISSN 0141-4488
