= Rhodesia, Nottinghamshire =

Village in Nottinghamshire, England

Coordinates: 53.314°N 1.155°W

Rhodesia
- Village and civil parish
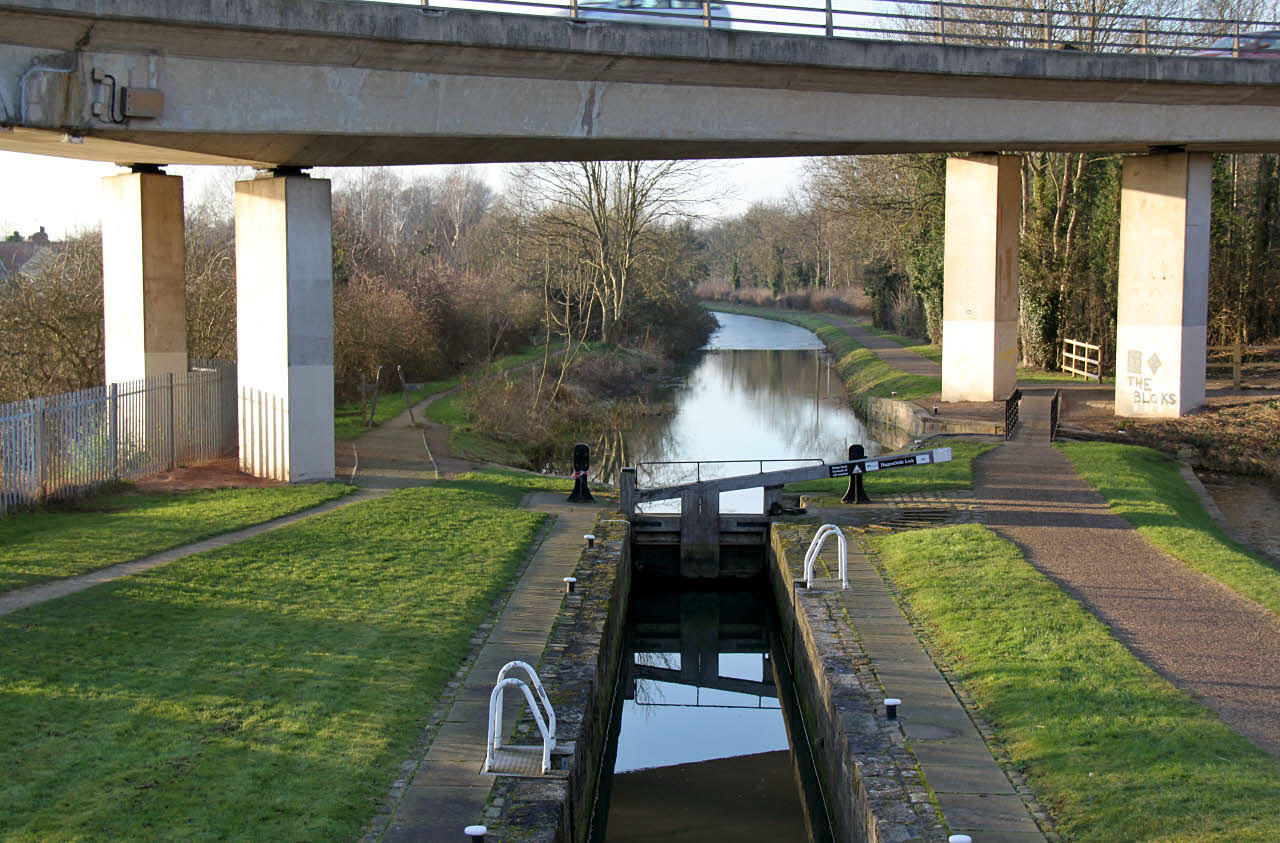
- Haggonfields Lock, on the Chesterfield Canal, located in the village.

- Location within Nottinghamshire
- Interactive map of Rhodesia
- Area: 0.426 sq mi (1.10 km^{2})
- Population: 1,173 (2021)
  - Density: 2,754/sq mi (1,063/km^{2})
- OS grid reference: SK 564799
  - London: 130 mi (210 km) SSE
- District: Bassetlaw
- Shire county: Nottinghamshire
- Region: East Midlands
- Country: England
- Sovereign state: United Kingdom
- Post town: WORKSOP
- Postcode district: S80
- Dialling code: 01909
- Police: Nottinghamshire
- Fire: Nottinghamshire
- Ambulance: East Midlands
- UK Parliament: Bassetlaw
- Website: Rhodesia parish council

Rhodesia is a village and civil parish in the Bassetlaw district of Nottinghamshire, England, just west of Worksop, and 20 miles (32 km) southeast of Sheffield. At the 2021 Census, the population was 1,173.

== History ==
The village was built in 1920, near the small settlement of Haggonfields, to provide housing for coal miners working at the nearby Shireoaks and Steetley pits. It was named after G. Preston Rhodes, then chairman of Shireoaks Colliery. Tylden Road, the main road through the village, was named after the pit's first manager. There are no longer any active mines in the area.

Rhodesia consists of just over 300 houses, a pub at Woodend, one shop, a school and a village hall. Part of the village is bordered by the Chesterfield Canal and it is also adjacent to the A57. Rhodesia is between Shireoaks and Retford railway stations, and the Robin Hood Line passes through the village.

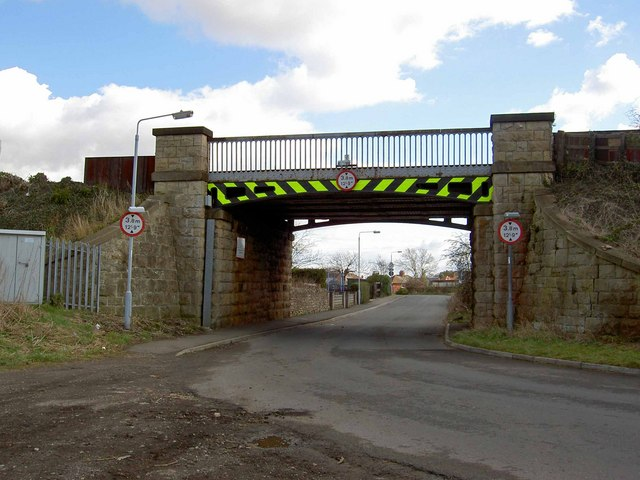
Bridge of the Robin Hood Line over an access road to the village
