= Thurcroft Colliery =

Former coal mine in South Yorkshire, England

Coordinates: 53.4019°N 1.2499°W

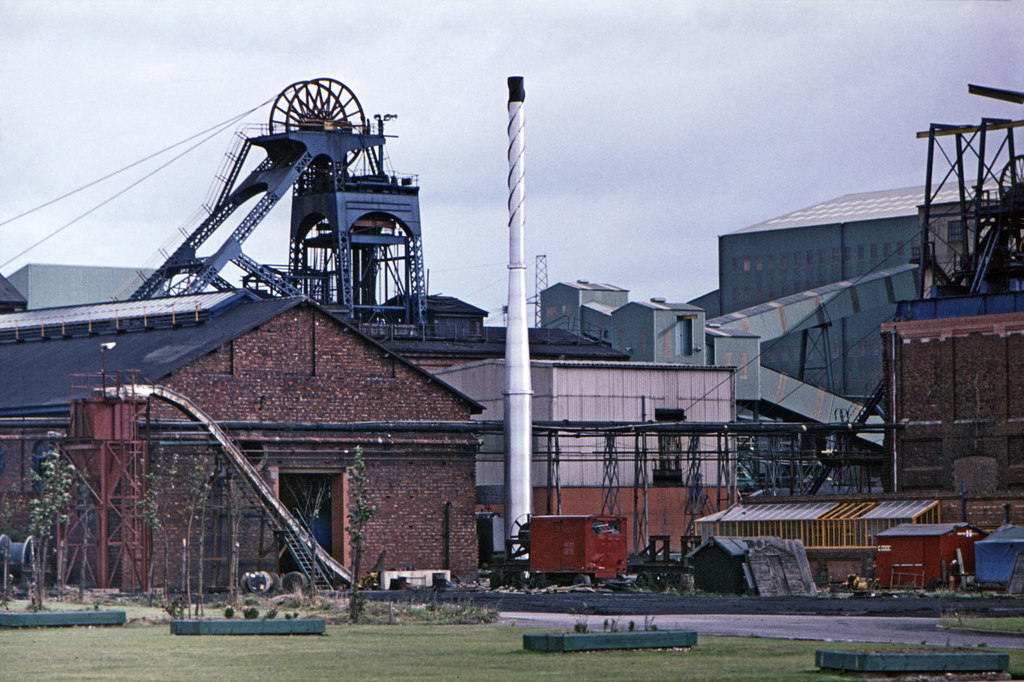
Thurcroft Colliery (1977)

Thurcroft Colliery was a coal mine situated in the village of Thurcroft, near Rotherham, South Yorkshire, England.

In 1902, the Rother Vale Colliery Company leased the rights to work coal from below the Thurcroft Estates which were owned by Messrs. Marrian (of Sharrow Hall, Sheffield) and Binns, but it was not until 7 years later that they began sinking a shaft.

Problems were encountered within a year when they found water which needed to be pumped from the workings and caused a delay in reaching the coal seam. The Barnsley seam, which is of good quality coal had been thrown out of its normal alignment and its expected position by a geological fault which was not discovered until the shaft was sunk.

Delays meant that no coal was produced until 1913. From 1913, the company began to build housing for the miners, designed by Rotherham architect James Knight.

The colliery was nationalized in 1947, becoming part of the National Coal Board. It was closed on 6 December 1991.
