= Nunnery Colliery =

Former coal mine in South Yorkshire, England

Coordinates: 53°23′7.3″N 1°26′7″W

Nunnery Colliery was a coal mine close to Sheffield at Darnall, South Yorkshire. The mining company, known as The Waverley Coal Company, also worked High Hazels Colliery about 3 miles (5 km) further east.

== History ==
Mining started on the Nunnery site in 1868 and it is claimed that its coal supplied the bulk of the coal trade within the city of Sheffield. A fire broke out in one of the shafts of the colliery on 12 July 1871, though all miners were able to escape via the other shaft and the fire was soon put out, but work was halted for several days.

The colliery was nationalised in 1947 becoming part of the National Coal Board and closed in August 1953, its reserves said to be exhausted.

== The Nunnery "Paddy Mail" accident ==
On 3 December 1923 an accident was caused by the breaking of a rope hauling an underground Paddy Mail train, carrying 90 men and 30 boys. Seven people were killed and around 50 others injured.

The 500-yard (460 m)-long rope was 19 months old but, the management stated that there was no guidance in the Mines Act (or elsewhere) as to the life, or required strength, of a rope. A section of the broken rope was submitted for examination to a local testing company and Dr C. H. Desch, Professor of Metallurgy at Sheffield University. The strain on the rope was at its highest level when the coal was being drawn, and one of the mysteries of the accident was that it occurred when the men were in the train and the strain would therefore be lighter.

James Hoyland, superintendent at the testing works said the test did not prove that the rope had materially weakened. Dr C. H. Desch said that he had examined the two pieces of broken rope 2 ft (60 cm) long taken from a short distance on each side of the fracture. He was unable to throw any light as to how the rope fractured in the way it did but it was clear that it broke in a tension pull. The jury at the inquest returned a verdict of "accidental death".

== The Locomotives ==
The Waverley Coal Company locomotives could be found working at Nunnery or High Hazels Collieries. All the locomotives listed below, except those shown as being scrapped became the property of the National Coal Board from 1 January 1947.

No./Name	Wheel Arr.	Cyls.	Makers	Wks No.	Date Blt.	Notes
No.1	0-6-0ST	IC	HE	252	1880	Scrapped April 1929
No.1	0-6-0ST	IC	HL	3002	1913	
No.2	0-6-0WT		FW	216	1874	Scrapped
No.2	0-6-0ST	IC	HE	786	1902	
No.2	0-6-0ST	OC	AE	1472	1904	ex-Eccles Slag Co., Rebuilt 1938
No.3	0-6-0ST	OC	FW	283	1875	Scrapped
No.3	0-6-0ST	IC	HL	2955	1912	Scrapped
No.6	0-4-0ST	OC	AB	899	1901	ex-Ried Bros., Glasgow
No.7	0-6-0ST	IC	HL	3726	1928	
No.8	0-6-0T	OC	HL	2879	1911	ex-M.D. & H. B. /S. & M. R. 'Thisbe'
No.9	0-6-0T	OC	KS	4080	1919	ex-LMSR No.1603 (1933)

== Abbreviations ==
Cylinders:

- IC Cylinders inside frames.
- OC Cylinders outside frames

Builders:

- AB Andrew Barclay & Sons Co.
- FW Fox, Walker & Co.
- HE Hunslet Engine Company
- HL Hawthorn Leslie and Company
- KS Kerr Stuart & Co.

Other

- M.D. & H.B. Mersey Docks and Harbour Board
- S.& M.R. Shropshire and Montgomeryshire Railway
