= Yorkshire Forward =

Former development agency for Yorkshire and the Humber, England

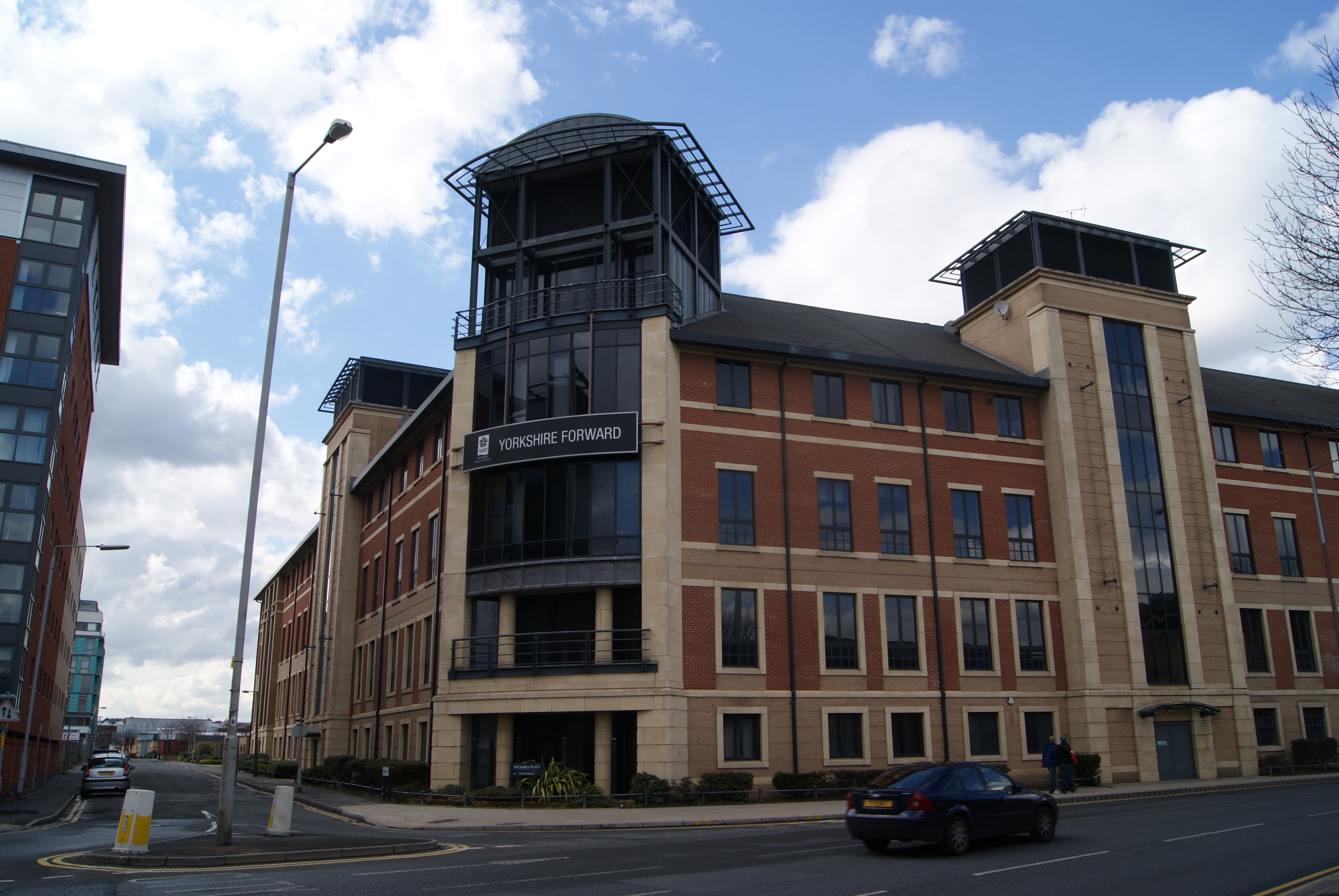
- Formation: 1999
- Defunct: 2012
- Legal status: Regional development agency
- Headquarters: Victoria House, 2 Victoria Place, Leeds, LS11 5AE
- Region served: Yorkshire and the Humber
- Budget: £277m (2009/10)
- Website: yorkshire-forward.com
- Remarks: Appointment: Department for Business, Enterprise and Regulatory Reform

Yorkshire Forward was the regional development agency (RDA) for the Yorkshire and the Humber region of the United Kingdom. It supported the development of business in the region by encouraging public and private investment in education, skills, environment and infrastructure. It was abolished on 31 March 2012 following the public spending review announced in 2010.

== Regional Economic Strategy ==
Yorkshire Forward was created in April 1999 as a non-departmental public body to drive and co-ordinate economic development and regeneration and to improve their [region's] relative competitiveness and reduce imbalances within and between regions.

Each of England's nine RDAs worked with partners in its region to create a Regional Economic Strategy (RES). Yorkshire and the Humber used the business cluster strategy of economic development, actively investing in key business sectors in an attempt to accelerate economic growth and encourage higher value added business. Yorkshire Forward identified 5 priority sectors that had the potential to deliver significant economic growth. The sectors were; Advanced Engineering and Materials, Digital and New Media, Environmental Technologies, Food and Drink, and Healthcare Technologies.

As part of the RES, Yorkshire Forward undertook an extensive programme of regeneration. This included prominent physical development activity, with high-profile processes in most of the region's major towns and cities. One such project was the Advanced Manufacturing Park on the Rotherham / Sheffield border.

Yorkshire Forward's responsibilities also included a Coalfields Programme, which saw the redevelopment and transformation of former coalfield sites into new residential, commercial or public open space developments.

In 2010 Yorkshire Forward provided £10 million to part-finance the Nuclear Advanced Manufacturing Research Centre led by the University of Sheffield with Rolls-Royce, anticipating involvement in any forthcoming new nuclear builds in the UK.

== History ==
The GDP of Yorkshire represents 8% of total UK output. However, growth has not been sufficient to begin closing the productivity gap between Yorkshire and the Humber and either the London or South East regions. Businesses in Yorkshire benefit from average salaries below the national average, operating costs up to 20% lower than the UK average, and a competitive property market. In the Liberal Democrat-Conservative's Emergency Budget of 22 June 2010, it was announced that regional development agencies such as Yorkshire Forward were set to be abolished as part of the programme of radical spending cuts to reduce the UK's national deficit. Following a government review, some of Yorkshire Forward's responsibilities passed to a series of new 'Local Enterprise Partnerships' across the area.
