= Kiveton Park Colliery =

Former coal mine in South Yorkshire, England

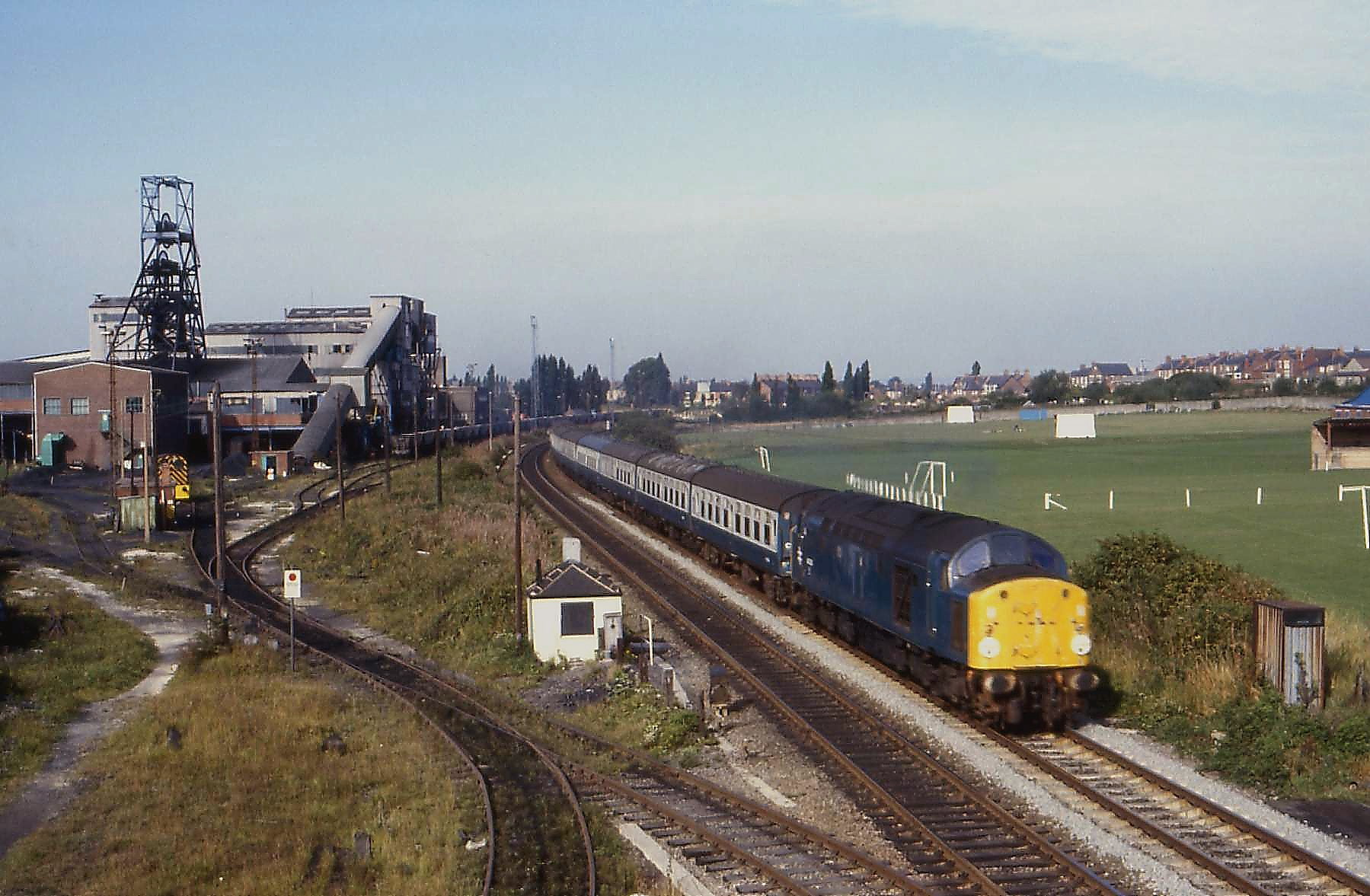
- 40001 Kiveton Park Colliery

- Location within South Yorkshire
- Location: England; 53°20′21″N 1°15′48″W
- Products: Coal; Coke
- Opened: 1866
- Closed: 1994

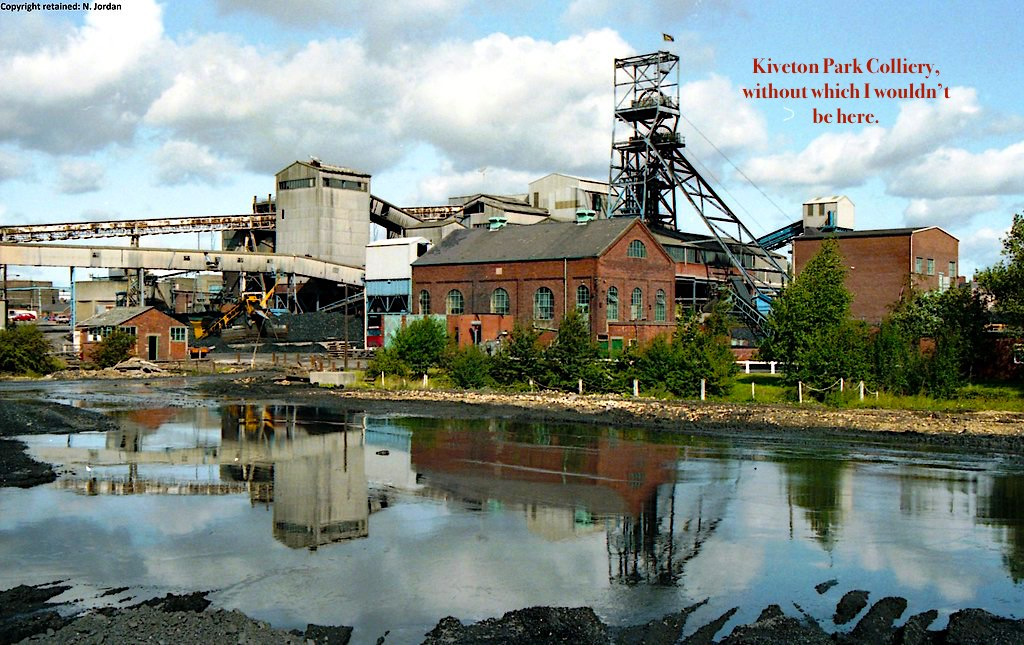

Kiveton Park Colliery was a coal mine in the village of Kiveton Park, near Rotherham, South Yorkshire, England.

== History ==
Until 1845, Kiveton was a rural village, where the main work was in agriculture. In that year, a railway line was built through the district, which connected Sheffield with Worksop, Retford, and Grimsby.

This line became part of the Manchester, Sheffield and Lincolnshire Railway. It provided a significant freight transport connection. Within 20 years of the railway's opening, coal was being mined at many locations along the line and transported and sold to merchants in the Manchester area and in the port of Grimsby.

In 1864, Carrington and Company leased rights to mine coal in the area around Kiveton. Sinking began on 6 June 1866 and the Barnsley seam was reached on 5 December 1867, just over 400 yards (370 m) below the surface.

In 1873, the Kiveton Park Colliery Company was founded, replacing the prior trading name and operation. Initially, gas was obtained from the Beighton Gas Company, but in the 1870s the company began to make their own. This lasted until 1956, when it started to draw a supply from the grid.

A new mining shaft was sunk in 1886, to reach the Thorncliffe seam. It reached its target at a depth of almost 700 yards (640 m). This coal was used for coking purposes and coke ovens were built adjacent to the colliery. The seam, because of a band of dirt at its centre, was an uneconomic proposition and abandoned after 10 years.

Another shaft was sunk adjacent to that serving the Barnsley seam and connected to it. For ventilation purposes this shaft was taken down to the Silkstone seam at over 700 yards (640 m). Passing through the High Hazels seam at just over 300 yards (270 m) this was opened up in 1900 because of its very good quality house coal. The small coal mined was used for manufacturing purposes. Until 1929, all coal was mined by hand, but in the years to 1940, the mining was mechanised.

In 1928, an amalgamation took place between Kiveton Park and Sherwood Collieries and in 1944 they were taken over by the United Steel Companies. The mining industry was nationalised in 1947.

The Barnsley seam was worked out in 1970, after just over 100 years of providing coal from its reserves. The colliery was closed in 1994.

Both the colliery offices and the pithead baths were grade II listed in October 1986. The offices date from 1875 and their listing makes note of their unusual survival in the South Yorkshire Coalfield. The pithead baths, despite being a listed structure, was demolished in late 2013. Much of the former site to the south of the colliery offices was remediated and landscaped before opening as the Kiveton Community Woodland.

== Fatal incidents ==
In November 1882, an underground explosion killed four men.

In June 1941, an explosion at the mine killed at least two miners. A fracture in a lamp was believed to have ignited a pocket of gas and caused the explosion in the Barnsley Seam. Five men were burned, two of whom died at the scene.

== Links to notable people ==
John Dennis, great-grandfather of comedian Hugh Dennis, was a miner at Kiveton Park Colliery.

Walter Cecil Castledine, father of theatre director Annie Castledine and grandfather of writer and academic Helen Morales, was an electrical engineer at Kiveton Park Colliery.
