= Thurcroft =

Village and civil parish in South Yorkshire, England

Coordinates: 53.391000°N 1.252000°W

- Location within South Yorkshire
- Population: 6,900 (Including Morthen. 2011)
- OS grid reference: SK5089
- Civil parish: Thurcroft
- Metropolitan borough: Rotherham
- Metropolitan county: South Yorkshire
- Region: Yorkshire and the Humber
- Country: England
- Sovereign state: United Kingdom
- Post town: ROTHERHAM
- Postcode district: S66
- Dialling code: 01709
- Police: South Yorkshire
- Fire: South Yorkshire
- Ambulance: Yorkshire
- UK Parliament: Rother Valley

Thurcroft is a village and civil parish situated south-east of Rotherham in the Metropolitan Borough of Rotherham in South Yorkshire, England. From 1902 to 1991, it was a mining community. It has a population of 5,296, increasing to 6,900 at the 2011 Census.

== History ==
The name Thurcroft has Norse (Viking) roots as 'thorr' means thunder in old Norse, so is probably at least a thousand years old. According to A. D. Mills in his Dictionary of English Place-Names, the first mention of Thurcroft is in 1319. Thurscroft: 'Enclosure of a man called Thorir. Old Scandinavian person's name + Old English word Croft.

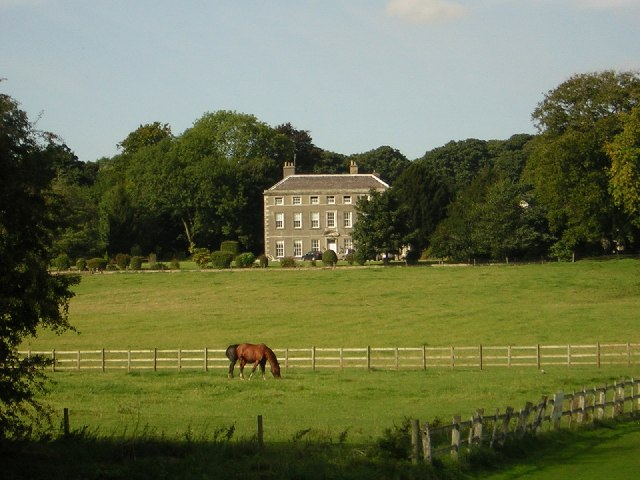
Thurcroft Hall

Until the 20th century, Thurcroft consisted of Thurcroft Hall, the longtime holding of the Mirfin family, and three other farms. Thurcroft Hall was held by the Mirfins (sometimes spelled Mirfield) until 1644 when Robert Mirfin, the lord of the manor, died childless. The property then was carried into the Beckwith family by his widow, who was also his stepsister. The Mirfields and the Levetts of nearby High Melton were interrelated, Thomas Levett having married Robert Mirfin's sister Elizabeth. In more recent times Thurcroft became home to the UK's largest battery "The Thurcroft battery".

== Coal mining ==
The land on which the village would eventually stand was bought in the 1800s (along with the Hall) by a Sheffield brewer (Thomas Marrian), whose son, Thomas Marrian Jr, leased the coal mining rights to Rother Vale Collieries in 1902. The economic development of Thurcroft effectively dates from the sinking of the coal mine in around 1909. Many of the terraced houses on the area showed characteristics of coal mining in the last quarter of the 19th century and first quarter of the 20th century. The population grew from next to nothing in 1900 to around 2,000 in 1923: Shortly after which the village saw hard times in the 1926 United Kingdom general strike, when 250,000 free meals were given out between May and September. By 1947, the mine employed over 2,000 men, and in the 1984/85 miners' strike the pit was again involved in industrial action.

The coal mine was closed in 1991 despite attempts by the workforce to buy it out.

== Church and parish ==
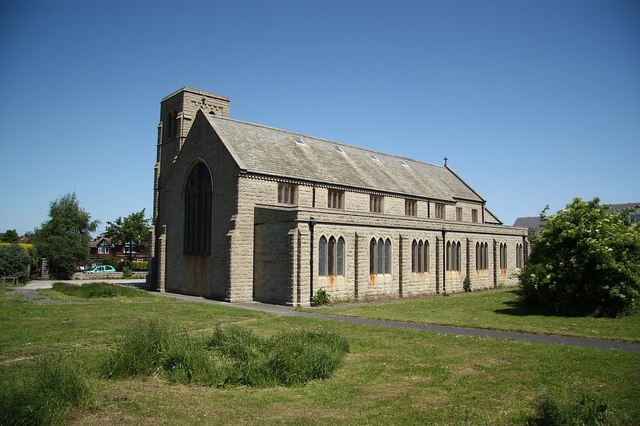
St. Simon and St. Jude's church

Before 1995, Thurcroft was within the parish of Laughton-en-le-Morthen and a permanent stone church was only built in 1937, making it one of the newest on this site (although there was a Methodist chapel built in 1917, and a village cemetery was established in the 1920s). Thurcroft parish became separate from Laughton in 1995. The old Catholic Church is now home to TCF Church.

== Big Local ==
Residents have created a Big Local partnership made up of local residents and people from organizations involved in the area which will then create a local plan using the ideas of local people. Once the plan is agreed with the Big Local Trust, the partnership can start to spend the money on the plan's priorities.

There is a Gordon Bennett Memorial hall in the village. Bennett who was a local councillor in the area, may or may not be linked with the English interjection 'Gordon Bennett'.

== See also ==
- Listed buildings in Thurcroft
