= Listed buildings in Thurcroft =

Thurcroft is a civil parish in the Metropolitan Borough of Rotherham, South Yorkshire, England. The parish contains 17 listed buildings that are recorded in the National Heritage List for England. Of these, one is listed at Grade II*, the middle of the three grades, and the others are at Grade II, the lowest grade. The parish contains the villages of Thurcroft and Brampton-en-le-Morthen and the surrounding area. The most important building in the parish is Thurcroft Hall, a country house, which is listed together with two associated structures. The other listed buildings consist of houses, cottages and associated structures, farmhouses and farm buildings, and a telephone kiosk.

== Key ==
Grade	Criteria
II*	Particularly important buildings of more than special interest
II	Buildings of national importance and special interest

== Buildings ==
Name and location	Photograph	Date	Notes	Grade
Manor Farmhouse, cottages and meeting house 53.38820°N 1.27129°W	—	16th century	The farmhouse was later altered and extended, and the complex consists of three dwellings and a meeting house, the earliest part with a timber framed core. The walls of the buildings are in sandstone and limestone, and the roofs are in Welsh slate, stone slate, pantile, and asbestos sheet. There are two storeys, a five-bay range facing the road, the meeting house forms a gabled cross-wing on the left, and there is an extended rear wing. The upper storey of the range facing the road is jettied and rendered, in the ground floor are three doorways and windows of various types, and in the upper floor are three-light mullioned windows. The meeting room has two mullioned and transomed windows.	II
Old Hall Cottages; 53.38979°N 1.27125°W	—	Late 16th century (probable)	A house, originally Brampton Hall, it has been divided into three, and is in sandstone on a chamfered plinth, with quoins, and a Welsh slate roof with crow-stepped coped gables and shaped kneelers. There are two storeys and attics, and a U-shaped plan, consisting of a two-bay range, cross-wings, and a two-storey porch on the left return. The windows are a mix; some are mullioned, some are mullioned and transomed, some are later sashes or casements, and some have hood moulds.	II
Farm View Cottages; 53.38879°N 1.27112°W	—	17th century	A house later divided into three cottages, it is in sandstone, with quoins, and a pantile roof with chamfered gable copings and shaped kneelers. There are two storeys and an L-shaped plan with an outshut in the angle. Some of the windows are casements, and others are mullioned.	II
Holme Farmhouse; 53.38901°N 1.27089°W	—	17th century	The farmhouse, which has been altered, is in roughcast sandstone, and has a Welsh slate roof with coped gables and shaped kneelers. There are two storeys and an attic, two bays facing the road, a two-bay rear wing on the left, and a single-bay extension. One doorway has a chamfered surround, and the other has a fanlight. Some windows are mullioned, and others are sashes or casements.	II
Green Arbour Farm Cottage; 53.38917°N 1.25436°W	—	Late 17th century	A farmhouse in sandstone, with quoins, and a roof of Welsh slate and pantile with coped gables and shaped kneelers. There are two storeys and an attic, and three bays. The central doorway has a chamfered and quoined surround and a deep lintel. One of the windows has a single light, and the others have chamfered mullions.	II
Thurcroft Hall; 53.39732°N 1.23508°W		1699	A country house, refronted in the 18th century, it is stuccoed, on a plinth, with rusticated quoins, bands, an eaves cornice and blocking course, and a hipped Welsh slate roof. There are three storeys, fronts of seven and three bays, a single-bay extension on the right, and a right rear wing. Two steps lead to the central doorway that has a moulded architrave, a pulvinated frieze, and a segmental pediment. Above is a sash window with an architrave and a linking apron, a sill with an inscribed motto, and the date on pilasters. The other windows are sashes, in the lower two floors with moulded surrounds, and at the rear is a Roman Doric stair window.	II*
Brampton Grange; 53.39078°N 1.27102°W	—	Early to mid 18th century	A house in sandstone with limestone dressings, chamfered quoins, a moulded eaves cornice, and a hipped pantile roof. There are two storeys and attics, and fronts of three bays. The doorway has an architrave, a fanlight, a pulvinated frieze, and a cornice. The windows are casements, the window above the door with a rusticated apron. At the rear is a canted bay window.	II
Granary, dovecote and barn, Holme Farm; 53.38902°N 1.27043°W	—	Mid 18th century	The farm buildings consist of a single-storey four-bay barn, and a three-storey single-bay granary and dovecote on the right. They are in sandstone with an asbestos sheet roof. The barn contains segmental-arched wagon entrances and slit vents. In the ground floor of the granary is a cartshed entrance, the middle floor contains a granary doorway and a casement window, and in the top floor is a lunette window with a corbelled ledge and a keystone. The right return contains a square-headed dovecote entry with a corbelled ledge.	II
Sawn Moor Farmhouse; 53.39108°N 1.25271°W	—	Mid to late 18th century	The farmhouse is in sandstone on a plinth, with quoins, and a twin Welsh slate roof with chamfered gable copings and shaped kneelers. There are two storeys and attics, a double-depth plan, and three bays. The central doorway has a plinth block and a keystone with a ledge, the ground floor windows are casements with keystones, in the upper floor are sash windows, and in the gable ends are small attic windows with keystones.	II
Garden House, Thurcroft Hall; 53.39710°N 1.23466°W	—	Mid to late 18th century	The garden house is in stone on a plinth, with a Westmorland slate roof and a pediment. There is a single storey and a single bay. The arched doorway has an architrave, a fanlight, a moulded impost, an archivolt, and a keystone, and it is flanked by semi-domed niches.	II
Barn, cartshed and granary, Sawn Moor Farm; 53.39123°N 1.25297°W	—	Late 18th century	The farm buildings are in sandstone, and have pantile roofs with coped gables and shaped kneelers. There are two storeys, a nine-bay barn, and a lower three-bay cowshed and granary. The barn contains wagon entries, doorways and windows, all with segmental-arched heads and keystones. On the cowshed are external steps, and it contains three segmental arches with keystones.	II
Thackeray Farmhouse; 53.38925°N 1.27089°W	—	Late 18th century	The farmhouse is in sandstone, with quoins, and a Welsh slate roof with coped gables and shaped kneelers. There are two storeys, and an L-shaped plan, with a front range of three bays, and a rear wing on the left. The central doorway has a deep lintel, above the doorway is a single-light casement window, and most of the other windows are horizontally-sliding sashes.	II
Outbuilding southeast of Thurcroft Hall; 53.39716°N 1.23432°W	—	Late 18th century	A coach house with a hayloft above, later used for other purposes, it is in sandstone with quoins, and a pantile roof with coped gables and shaped kneelers. There are two storeys and a single bay. It contains a segmental-arched carriage entrance with a quoined surround, and in the upper floor is a doorway with rounded arrises, and a fanlight in a triangular pediment.	II
Town End Farmhouse; 53.38837°N 1.27066°W	—	c. 1800	The farmhouse, which was extended in the 19th century, is in sandstone on a chamfered plinth, with quoins, eaves bands, and hipped tile roofs. There are two storeys and a T-shaped plan, the earlier part forming a two-bay cross-wing, and the later part recessed to the right with three bays. The doorway in the earlier part has a fanlight, in the later part is a doorway with a quoined surround, the windows are sashes, and in the left return is a round-headed stair window.	II
Barn, Manor Farm; 53.38802°N 1.27195°W	—	Early 19th century	The barn is in sandstone on a plinth, with a hipped asbestos sheet roof. There are two storeys and six bays. The barn contains wagon entries and doorways with segmental-arched heads and quoined surrounds, slit vents, and hatches.	II
Barn, Town End Farm; 53.38806°N 1.27077°W		Early 19th century	The barn is in sandstone on a plinth, with an eaves band and a hipped pantile roof. There are two storeys and an L-shaped plan, with a front range of seven bays, and a three-bay rear wing on the left. In the centre is a tall segmental-arched wagon entrance with quoined jambs, and in the outer bays are slit vents.	II
Telephone kiosk 53.38890°N 1.27110°W		1935	The K6 type telephone kiosk was designed by Giles Gilbert Scott. Constructed in cast iron with a square plan and a dome, it has three unperforated crowns in the top panels.	II
