= Fence Colliery =

Former coal mine in South Yorkshire, England

Coordinates: 53.3670°N 1.3403°W

Fence Colliery was a small colliery sunk at the lower end of the village of Fence, South Yorkshire, England alongside the main Sheffield to Worksop road in the 1840s, shortly before the opening of the North Midland Railway through the Rother Valley.

== History ==
The original coal pit at Fence, a small village within Rotherham Rural District alongside the main Sheffield to Worksop road. started operations in the 1840s.

In 1862 the Fence Colliery Company was formed to purchase the colliery, this leading to a period of development of the colliery and the building of houses for its workers. These were built along Falconer Lane, on the opposite side of the main road to the colliery, and are still in use. In late 1864, an explosion caused by the ignition of firedamp killed one worker and injured several others.

== Closure and after life ==
Fence colliery closed as a coal producing unit in 1904, coal from its reserves being brought to the surface at Orgreave, but it was retained as a pumping station until 1957. Nationalisation came in 1947 and in the 1950s the site became home to the National Coal Boards divisional workshops, finally closing in the 1990s. After a short period of inactivity the site was redeveloped as Ley's Cast Iron Foundry, being relocated from Dronfield.
