= United Steel Companies =

Defunct steelmaking, engineering, coal mining and coal by-product company

- Industry: Steel
- Founded: 1918
- Defunct: 1967
- Fate: Nationalised
- Successor: British Steel Corporation
- Headquarters: South Yorkshire and Lincolnshire, UK

The United Steel Companies was a steelmaking, engineering, coal mining and coal by-product group based in South Yorkshire and Lincolnshire, England.

Shortly after the United Steel Companies' creation in 1918, it united several collieries and steel makers, including Samuel Fox and Company, Steel, Peech and Tozer, Appleby-Frodingham Steel Company. and Rother Vale Collieries. During the interwar period and the Second World War, further companies would be acquired, such as the Sheffield Coal Company, Kiveton Park Colliery Company, Shireoaks Colliery Company, and the Yorkshire Engine Company.

During the late 1950s and early 1960s, the United Steel Companies was an early pioneer in the field of management cybernetics; under the direction of Stafford Beer, a operational research department was established, and the first computer to be specifically dedicated to management cybernetics, a Ferranti Pegasus, was installed. In July 1967, the company was one of 14 major British steel makers to be nationalised, its steel works becoming a part of the British Steel Corporation while the collieries were passed to the National Coal Board.

== History ==
The company was incorporated in 1918; during the following year, multiple firms amalgamated together under its banner, these being the steel makers Samuel Fox and Company of Stocksbridge; Steel, Peech and Tozer of Templeborough and Ickles in Rotherham; the Appleby-Frodingham Steel Company of Scunthorpe; and the coal mining and by-products interests of Rother Vale Collieries at Orgreave, Treeton and Thurcroft.

Over the years, other companies were added to the portfolio, such as the Sheffield Coal Company, owners of Birley Collieries, Brookhouse and North Staveley collieries, which were was bought by the United Steel Companies in 1937. This also included coal by-product operations at Orgreave and Brookhouse, suppliers of Metallurgical Coke for Blast Furnaces.

The Kiveton Park Colliery Company was taken over in 1944 with reserves from, amongst others, the Barnsley seam being an attractive proposition. The facilities also included coke and coal by-products (including gas). The colliery interests became part of the National Coal Board at nationalisation. The coke ovens closed in 1956 and the colliery closed in 1984.

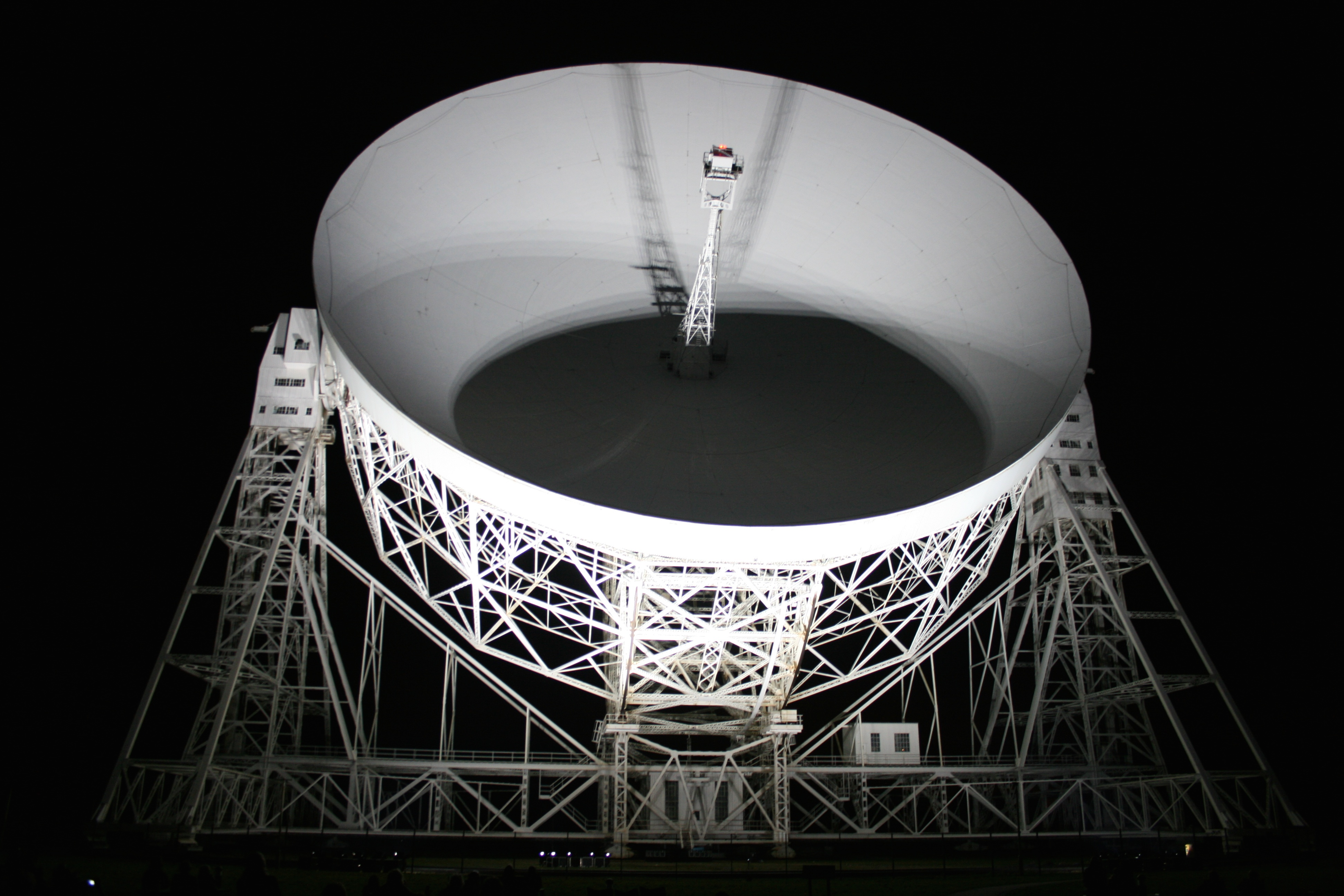
United Steel Structural (later known as Redpath Dorman Long) built Jodrell Bank Observatory in the mid-1950s

In 1945, the mining portfolio was increased with the purchase of the Shireoaks Colliery Company, the colliery being just over the Nottinghamshire border.

The Yorkshire Engine Company was bought by the United Steel Companies Limited in June 1945. It was said there were two reasons for the purchase. With United Steels wanting new locomotives following the end of World War II, the opportunity arose to purchase the company at a good price and also a suggestion to centralise the engineering workshops which would serve their steelworks at Templeborough (Rotherham) and Stocksbridge. The works, at Meadowhall, closed in 1967.

In July 1967, the United Steel Companies was one of 14 major British steel companies to be nationalised, its iron and steel works becoming part of British Steel Corporation, while the mining interests were transferred to the National Coal Board. The coal by-products plants came under the ownership of a subsidiary, The United Coke and Chemical Company.

The steel interests at Rotherham and Stocksbridge subsequently became a part of Tata Steel, the steel plant in Scunthorpe part of the new British Steel, and all the mining interests have been closed, the last, Treeton Colliery, in the 1990s.

== Management approach ==
During 1956, Stafford Beer joined the company's management team; a proponent of operational research (OR), Beer convinced the firm to establish its own OR department, which he headed. It expanded to over 70 professionals and performed various studies across the business' activities. Accordingly, the United Steel Companies became one of the pioneers of management cybernetics, opting to install a Ferranti Pegasus computer in Cybor House, located in Tapton House Road, Sheffield. This was the first computer to be specifically dedicated to management cybernetics.
