= Orgreave Colliery =

Former coal mine in South Yorkshire, England

Coordinates: 53.37917°N 1.36469°W

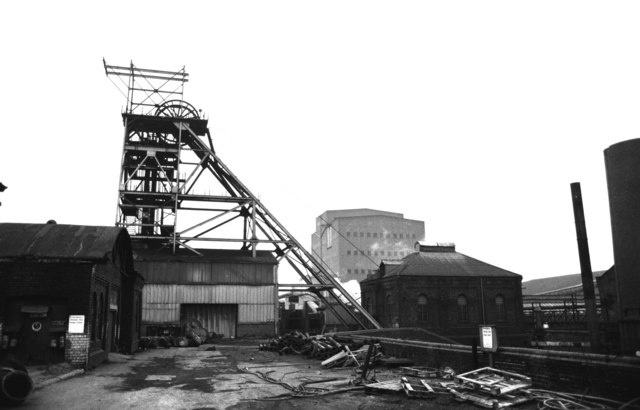

Orgreave Colliery was a coal mine situated adjacent to the main line of the Manchester, Sheffield and Lincolnshire Railway about 5 miles (8 km) east of Sheffield and 3.5 miles (6 km) south west of Rotherham. The colliery is within the parish of Orgreave, from which it takes its name.

In June 1984, the adjacent coking works was the scene of a vicious confrontation between police and striking miners during the Miners' Strike.

== History ==
The opening, by the Sorby family, of Dore House Colliery in 1820 saw the beginning of coal mining in the area around Orgreave, the first shaft of Orgreave Colliery itself being sunk in 1851.

Just over a mile east in the Rother Valley below the village of Fence a colliery was commenced in 1842. This colliery was bought and the Fence Colliery Company founded in 1862. In 1870 this company acquired Orgreave from the Sorby family and in 1875 its Directors leased land in the area from the Duke of Norfolk. In the same year the Fence Colliery Company was renamed Rother Vale Collieries Limited, owning Orgreave and Fence collieries, later sinking a new colliery at Treeton. Fence colliery was connected underground to Orgreave from 1887 and coal was drawn there from 1904.

Following the First World War Orgreave was acquired by the United Steel Companies who used the coal obtained to supply the new Orgreave Coking and By Products plant. Metallurgical coke was supplied from here to United Steel’s blast furnace plant at Scunthorpe. From 1922 coke oven gas was supplied to the Sheffield Gas Company, this continuing until the advent of gas from below the North Sea.

At nationalisation the mining and coking operations were split, the coal processing and chemicals interests stayed with United Steel Companies under their subsidiary, the United Coke & Chemical Company. The collieries at Orgreave and Treeton were linked underground and as well as the coking plant the coal drawn by these collieries was fed to the washery at Orgreave coal preparation plant. Orgreave colliery closed in October 1981, the coking ovens in 1990.

In 1995, British Coal Opencast gained permission to restore the tip, which reputedly contained over 12 million tonnes of spoil, and make the land fit for rebuilding. This work included the recovery of coal, from the tip and sub-surface, by opencasting. On 30 November 2005, the last coal was removed from the Orgreave site, bringing an end to an era which began over 170 years before.

The River Rother, dubbed one of the country’s most polluted, was re-routed over a stretch of almost ¾ mile and, in conjunction with the closure of the Coalite and Chemicals plant at Bolsover, cleaned up. The area is now rich in wildlife.

== Redevelopment ==
100 acres (0.40 km^{2}) of the reclaimed site is now the Advanced Manufacturing Park, home to research and manufacturing organisations such as the Advanced Manufacturing Research Centre with Boeing, Castings Technology International, UK Atomic Energy Authority South Yorkshire and TWI's Yorkshire Technology Centre.

A further 741 acres (300 ha) is now being developed to form the new Waverley Community. When complete the development will include residential (4000 homes), office and commercial areas. The project aims to achieve zero carbon status and be an exemplar of sustainable development with 222 acres (0.90 km^{2}) of green space including recreation areas with parkland, three lakes, reservoir, and woodland.

== Rail connections ==
The Manchester, Sheffield & Lincolnshire Railway's (MS&LR) "Extension to London Act" not only contained details of the new main line but also five branch lines to serve collieries on the route, with one exception, that to Orgreave Colliery which was to be served from the MS&LR line about one mile (1.6 km) west of Woodhouse. In fact this was to become the only branch to be built. It left the main line, where exchange sidings were located, opposite Orgreaves Colliery signal box, (Note: The 's' was added in error by the MS&LR but was never corrected.) and ran through to a halt at the colliery at the bottom of a 1 in 27 incline.

== The Orgreave Paddy Mail ==
The colliery was served, at shift change times by workmen's trains, known as Paddy mails, which ran between Sheffield Victoria and Orgreave Colliery. One of these trains was involved in an accident on the morning of 13 December 1926.

The train service was withdrawn in May 1932 when the River Rother flooded and washed away parts of the three bridges which crossed it. All traffic was severed and a replacement bus service was introduced in place of the Paddy mail which never returned. Sheffield Corporation began operating a regular service of "Pit Buses" along the main routes from the city centre.

== Rolling stock ==
The Rothervale Collieries locomotives could be found working at Orgreave, Treeton and Thurcroft Collieries and were transferred as necessary. All the locomotives listed below, except those shown as being scrapped or being owned by United Coke and Chemicals, became the property of the National Coal Board on nationalisation.

Number	Wheel Arrangement	Cylinders	Manufacturer	Works Number	Date	Notes
Orgreave Colliery No.1	0-6-0ST	Outside	Hudswell, Clarke & Rodgers	116	1872	Returned to builders 1891
Rothervale No.0	0-6-0ST	Inside	Beyer, Peacock & Company	1830	1879	ex-E&WJR No.1(4.1890). Rothervale No.1 until 1929
Rothervale No.1	0-6-0ST	Outside	Yorkshire Engine Company	2240	1929	
Rothervale No.2	0-6-0ST	Outside	Hudswell, Clarke & Rodgers	170	1876	Scrapped 1920
Rothervale No.2	0-6-0ST	Outside	Yorkshire Engine Company		1921	
Rothervale No.3	0-6-0ST	Outside	Hudswell Clarke	376	1891	
Rothervale No.4	0-6-0ST	Inside	Hunslet Engine Company	410	1893	
Rothervale No.5	0-4-0ST	Outside	Manning Wardle	794	1882	ex C.J.Willis, scrapped 1912
Rothervale No.6	0-6-0ST	Inside	Hudswell Clarke	565	1900	
Rothervale No.7	0-6-0ST	Outside	Yorkshire Engine Company	1021	1909	
Rothervale No.8	0-6-0ST	Outside	Kerr, Stuart & Company	3075	1917	ex Railway Operating Division No.607/1919
Rothervale No.9	0-6-0ST	Outside	Andrew Barclay Sons & Co	1347	1918	ex Frodingham Iron Co 1922
No.10 Huntsman	0-6-0ST	Outside	Andrew Barclay Sons & Co	2010	1936	ex Tinsley Park Collieries
No.11	0-6-0ST	Inside	Hunslet Engine Company	3134	1944	
No.1	0-6-0ST	Outside	Yorkshire Engine Company	2524	1953	Owned by United Coke &
No.2	0-6-0ST	Outside	Yorkshire Engine Company	2562	1954	Chemicals for working at Orgreave Coke Ovens
No.5	0-6-0DE		Yorkshire Engine Company	2670	1958	New to Stanton Ironworks (No50), preserved at Nene Valley Railway

== Sources ==
East of Sheffield, by Roger Milnes, "Forward", Journal of the Great Central Railway Society, No.16, March 1978. ISSN 0141-4488. (This article also uses unpublished research material not used in "East of Sheffield" provided by members of the Woodhouse Local History Group, local members of the Great Central Railway Society and others).
