= Woodhouse railway station =

Railway station in South Yorkshire, England

Woodhouse
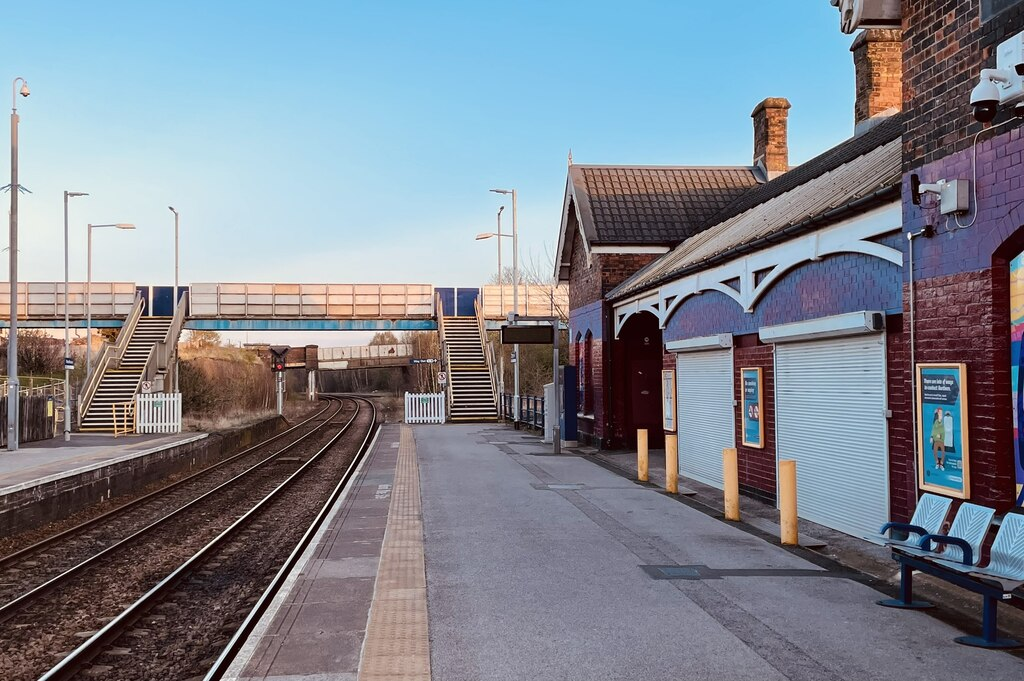
- The station in 2025

General information
- Location: Woodhouse, City of Sheffield; England
- Coordinates: 53.36382°N 1.35753°W
- Grid reference: SK428854
- Manager: Northern Trains
- Transit authority: Travel South Yorkshire
- Platforms: 2

Other information
- Station code: WDH
- Fare zone: Sheffield
- Classification: DfT category F2

History
- Original company: Manchester, Sheffield and Lincolnshire Railway
- Pre-grouping: Great Central Railway
- Post-grouping: London and North Eastern Railway

Key dates
- October 1850: First station opened as Woodhouse Junction
- 11 October 1875: Resited 640 m west and renamed Woodhouse

Passengers
- 2021/22: ▲20,606
- 2022/23: ▲27,492
- 2023/24: ▲33,496
- 2024/25: ▲40,388
- 2025/26: ▲47,756
Location
Notes
- Passenger statistics from the Office of Rail and Road

Woodhouse railway station serves Woodhouse and Woodhouse Mill in Sheffield, South Yorkshire, England. The station is 5.25 miles (8 km) east of Sheffield station on the Sheffield to Lincoln Line.

The next station east was Waleswood, until its closure in 1955, and is now Kiveton Bridge. The next station west is Darnall. Beighton railway station, originally adjacent to the junction with the Midland Railway, but rebuilt by the MS&LR when it began work on its "Derbyshire Lines", was until 1954 the next station south.

Woodhouse Mill, Orgreave and Fence were served by a station on the North Midland Railway named Woodhouse Mill.

From 1955 until removal in 1981, the Barnsley Junction-Rotherwood segment of the Manchester – Sheffield – Wath electrification terminated slightly west of the Woodhouse station platforms, within sight of the station.

== History ==
The present station is the second built to serve the community of Woodhouse, then separate from and not under the governance of Sheffield. The railway line between Sheffield and Gainsborough was proposed by the Sheffield and Lincolnshire Junction Railway (S&LJR); upon authorisation of this line in August 1846, the S&LJR amalgamated with other railways to form the Manchester, Sheffield and Lincolnshire Railway (MS&LR).

The first section of the S&LJR line, between Sheffield and Beighton (on the Midland Railway) opened on 12 February 1849; the second section, which left the first near Woodhouse and ran to Gainsborough, opened on 17 July 1849. A station at the junction was opened by the MS&LR in October 1850, named Woodhouse Junction.

The original station was at the bottom of Junction Lane, adjacent to the present Woodhouse Junction, formerly East Junction, signal box and was built to serve the communities of Beighton, then within Derbyshire, and Woodhouse. This station was closed on 11 October 1875 and replaced on the same day by a new station 700 yards (640 m) to the west, named Woodhouse. The new station was one of the earliest examples of the Manchester, Sheffield and Lincolnshire Railway's Double Pavilion designs at its present location.

=== Platforms ===
The current station has two platforms; what looks like a third disused and overgrown platform on the Down Side (Sheffield bound side) is a former Goods loading bay, whilst on the Up side (Worksop bound), again what looks like a disused platform is actually the truncated former Up Goods line that ran behind the Up Main platform. A number of goods sidings exist immediately to the east, which see sporadic use by engineers trains.

=== Colliery lines ===
Woodhouse was the hub of two colliery branches: to the west a branch to Orgreave Colliery, which was extended to reach Treeton Colliery under the MS&LR (Extension to London) Act 1893 and opened on 10 October 1898, and, to the east, from Woodhouse East Junction, the Birley Branch, which served the Birley Collieries, belonging to the Sheffield Coal Company.

== Facilities ==
The station is unstaffed and has no ticket provision - these must be bought in advance of travel or on the train. The buildings on both sides remain intact and each have waiting areas within. Train running information is provided by a customer help point on platform 1, display screens and timetable posters. Step-free access is only available to platform 1, as the footbridge from there to platform 2 has steps.

== Services ==
All services at Woodhouse are operated by Northern Trains using Class 150 and 195 DMUs.

The typical off-peak service in trains per hour is:

- 1 tph to Leeds via Sheffield
- 1 tph to Lincoln via Retford

On Sundays, the station is served by an hourly service between Lincoln and Sheffield, with some services continuing to Huddersfield.

There was a proposition by FirstGroup's Hull Trains to begin a new service between London King's Cross to Sheffield, stopping at Worksop station, giving Woodhouse its first direct service to London in decades. However, this proposal was rejected by the Office of Rail and Road in 2025.

Preceding station	National Rail	Following station
Darnall	Northern Trains Sheffield to Lincoln Line	Kiveton Bridge
	Proposed services	
Sheffield	Sheffield by Hull Trains East Coast Main Line	Worksop
	Historical railways	
Darnall Line and station open	Great Central Railway Derbyshire Lines	Beighton Line open, station closed
