= Advanced Manufacturing Park =

Manufacturing technology park in Waverley, Rotherham, South Yorkshire, England

Coordinates: 53.385°N 1.379°W

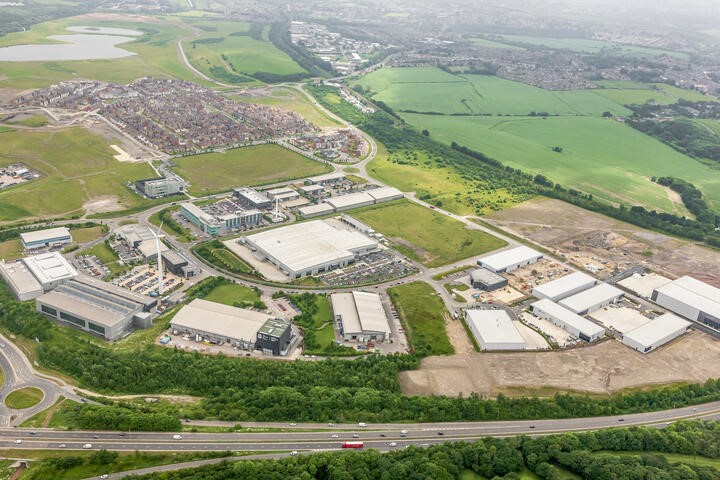
Advanced Manufacturing Park (AMP) 2019

The Advanced Manufacturing Park (AMP) is a 150-acre (61 ha) manufacturing technology park in Waverley, Rotherham, South Yorkshire, England. It was partly funded by the European Regional Development Fund, with Yorkshire Forward, and developed by Harworth Group, previously the property development arm of UK Coal, on reclaimed opencast coal mine land close to the site of the battle of Orgreave.

== Organisations on site ==
The major tenants at the AMP include:

- Advanced Manufacturing Research Centre (AMRC), The University of Sheffield
- Boeing
- Bodycote
- Castings Technology International (Cti)
- Danieli
- X-Cel Superturn
- McLaren Automotive
- Metalysis
- Nikken Europe
- Nuclear Advanced Manufacturing Research Centre (Nuclear AMRC)
- Rolls-Royce
- Sandvik Coromant
- The Welding Institute
- UK Atomic Energy Authority

The AMP Technology Centre houses approximately 40 manufacturing/technology related businesses in its three buildings. These range from start-up companies, to spin-outs from universities and larger companies. The Centre also houses conference and meeting room facilities.

== Development history ==
=== 2024 ===
In October the Harworth Group announced a deal with Insight, a solutions and systems integrator. Their 73,000 sq ft unit, will serve as a major European Solutions Integration Centre, bringing together several operational processes under one roof, including technology lab services and office functions.

In May, Harworth announced it had completed a c. 40,400 sq. ft letting to Calibre Scientific, a global life sciences and diagnostics company. They will become the anchor tenant, at R-evolution 4, the name for the latest development of industrial units on the AMP.

=== 2023 ===
In November it was announced that Italian steel company Danieli will be building a new 47,000sq ft head office, research base and distribution facility at the AMP.

In October it was revealed that Technicut, the UK’s largest cutting tool manufacturer, would move into a purpose-built 86,000 sq.ft unit on the AMP. The facility will include a mix of production, lab, and office space.

=== 2022 ===
In April 2022, the Harworth Group announced that it had secured planning consent for a new development of 93,000 sq. ft of industrial units, in the southern part of the AMP. The development comprises three buildings ranging from 17,000 sq. ft to 44,000 sq. ft, and is designed for sub-division into smaller units as required.

=== 2021 ===
In January 2021 it was announced that the management of Castings Technology International Ltd had undertaken a buyout of the business from the University of Sheffield. The newly independent company would remain located in its AMP-based facilities.

In September 2021, the UK Atomic Energy Authority's (UKAEA) new fusion energy research facility was officially opened at the AMP. The pioneering facility includes the CHIMERA (Combined Heating and Magnetic Research Apparatus) test rig - the only facility in the world with the ability to test prototype components in an environment simulating the conditions inside a fusion power plant.

=== 2019 ===
It was announced in early September that the UK Atomic Energy Authority (UKAEA) plans to locate a fusion energy research facility at the AMP next year to engage industry in commercial fusion energy development. Construction of the facility was completed in October 2020.

=== 2018 ===
The Duke of Cambridge, the Duchess of Cambridge and the Crown Prince of Bahrain officially opened the McLaren Composites Technology Centre (MCTC). This is a production facility for McLaren Automotive. where the carbon tubs for McLaren's road cars are manufactured.

=== 2016 ===
2016 saw the official opening of a new 32,000 sq ft facility which comprised the third phase of the AMP Technology Centre. The building, funded by the Homes and Communities Agency, includes specialist office and workshop spaces. The purpose of the facility is to provide companies the opportunity to expand into larger premises from existing Technology Centre facilities as well as attracting high technology companies from further afield.

=== 2015 ===
2015 saw the opening of a new demonstration and customer support centre – the Nikken Innovation Centre Europe at the AMP's R-evolution development. The Centre is designed to help companies become more competitive by increasing production rates and quality while reducing costs. In 2018, Nikken announced a further expansion of the Centre.

=== 2014 ===
The University of Sheffield Advanced Manufacturing Research Centre (AMRC) with Boeing signed a deal to secure land at Sheffield Business Park, paving the way for the further expansion of the AMRC which could not be accommodated on the AMP site. The first development at the new location, sited directly opposite the existing AMPs developments on the other side of the Parkway, was announced as the AMRC Factory 2050. This £43 million project will develop the UK's first fully reconfigurable assembly and component manufacturing facility for collaborative research, capable of rapidly switching production between different high-value components and one-off parts.

In March 2014 Rotherham Council announced a £4.3 million deal that will enable development to begin at the R-evolution @ The AMP scheme. Landowner and developer, Harworth Estates had previously announced plans to develop 100,000 sq ft of industrial units on seven acres of land, following on from the success of the Evolution @ the AMP development built in 2008.

=== 2013 ===
The year saw construction of two major new facilities for the AMRC.

Firstly, The AMRC Training Centre, based in a new 5,500 sq m building. The Centre took in its first intake of students in autumn 2013 with partial funding from a £9.2 million Regional Growth Fund grant.

In February 2013, Harworth Estates announced that it had sold the 'Evolution @ the AMP' development of light industrial / hybrid units to Cornerstone, the real estate advisory and investment company, for £7 million.

During the summer of 2013 The University of Sheffield Advanced Manufacturing Research Centre (AMRC) announced its acquisition of Castings Technology International (Cti). As part of the agreement, the staff, buildings and assets of Cti and Titanium Castings UK Ltd (TCUK), including the ongoing research work, commercial contracts and consultancy were transferred to become a University of Sheffield subsidiary company.

=== 2012 ===
An official groundbreaking ceremony took place to mark the start of construction on the ABCF in June 2012, with the Business Secretary Vince Cable and Rolls-Royce's Colin Smith, Director of Engineering and Technology performing the honours with some of Rolls-Royce's apprentices.

Harworth Estates also agreed contracts with Taylor Wimpey, Harron Homes and Barratt Homes to build new homes on their Waverley site (adjacent to the AMP) marking the first phase of residential development. The house builders acquired a total of 20 acres for an initial 254 homes, and work on the infrastructure and spine road access to the housing site started in spring 2012. The first houses were offered for sale following a launch event with England 1966 football hero Gordon Banks in September 2012.

=== 2010 ===
The AMP became home to the new £25 million Nuclear Advanced Manufacturing Research Centre (Nuclear AMRC) led by the University of Sheffield with Rolls-Royce, funded with £15 million from the Department for Business, Innovation and Skills and £10 million from the regional development agency Yorkshire Forward. The virtual ground-breaking for the site was performed by Her Majesty The Queen.

=== 2009 ===
2009 saw the completion of an extension to the AMP Technology Centre, doubling the lettable office and workshop space. Alongside other innovative features the building also boasted an adjacent hydrogen minigrid system (HMGS). The HMGS worked by capturing wind energy to generate electricity for the building from a 225KW wind turbine. Any excess electricity was then converted to hydrogen via electrolysis for later use by either a fuel cell during periods of low wind speed or as transport fuel via a hydrogen refuelling point.

=== 2008 ===
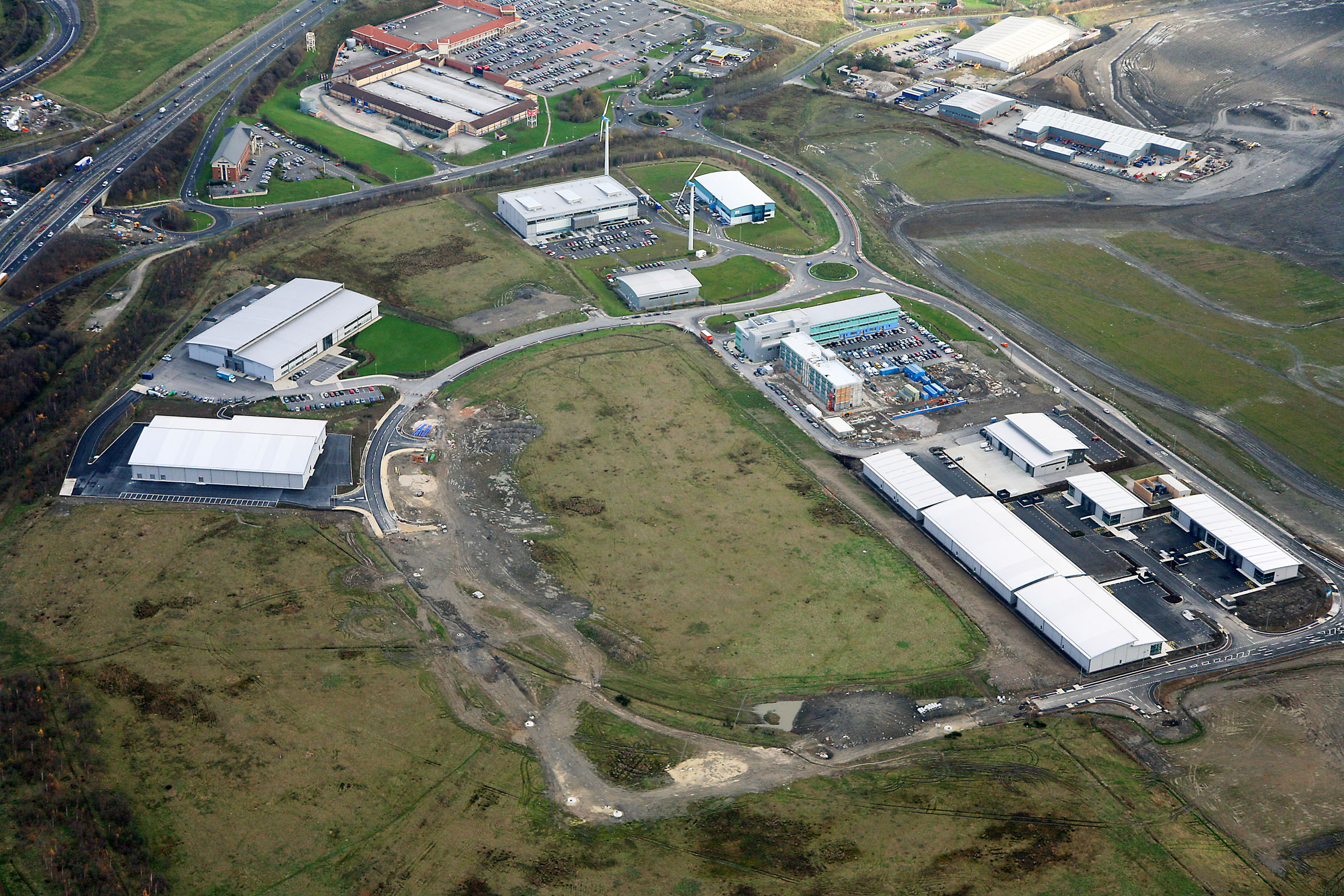
Advanced Manufacturing Park, November 2008

The Rolls-Royce "Factory of the Future with Boeing" was built as part of the University of Sheffield's Advanced Manufacturing Research Centre (AMRC).

The Factory was purpose built to house the latest manufacturing equipment and production capabilities. Information Communications Technology (ICT) and 'virtual' manufacturing were the key components of the new facility, along with alternative manufacturing methods, such as additive manufacturing processes which grow 3-dimensional parts; considerably reducing material waste and increasing design flexibility. Construction was completed by the end of 2007, and the facility officially opened in summer 2008.

2008 also saw the construction of the 'Evolution @ the AMP' development of speculative industrial units. This was the first private sector investment at the AMP. The anchor tenant was Dormer Tools, who opened a new Research & Development facility.

=== 2006 ===
Yorkshire Forward completed the construction of the main wing of the AMP Technology Centre, 27,000 sq ft (2,500 m^{2}) of offices and workshops to cater for small high-growth companies in the Advanced Manufacturing and Materials sector. The building was officially opened in November by three-time Formula 1 World Champion Sir Jackie Stewart.

The Castings Technology International & TWI Yorkshire buildings were also opened.

=== 2004 ===
The first Advanced Manufacturing Research Centre (AMRC) building was opened, the first facility developed on the AMP.

== Road names ==
All roads on the AMP are named after famous engineers. These include:

- Brindley Way – James Brindley: canal engineer, and one of the most notable engineers of the eighteenth century
- Brunel Way – Isambard Kingdom Brunel: considered "one of the most ingenious and prolific figures in engineering history"
- Lanchester Way - Frederick W. Lanchester: engineer who made important contributions to automotive engineering and to aerodynamics
- Mitchell Way – R. J. Mitchell: aeronautical engineer, who designed many aircraft including the Supermarine Spitfire
- Morse Way – Stephen Morse: inventor of the twist drill
- Selden Way – George B. Selden: inventor granted a U.S. patent for an automobile in 1895.
- Stephenson Way – Robert Stephenson: designer of the Rocket locomotive in 1829.
- Telford Way - Thomas Telford; leading civil engineer who worked on many canals, including the Caledonian Canal.
- Wallis Way – Barnes Wallis: scientist, engineer and inventor, best known for inventing the bouncing bomb used by The Dam Busters.
- Whittle Way – Frank Whittle: inventor of the turbojet engine.
