= Treeton Colliery =

Former coal mine in South Yorkshire, England

Coordinates: 53.385°N 1.345°W

Treeton Colliery was a coal mine situated in the village of Treeton, near Rotherham, South Yorkshire, England.

Work on the sinking of Treeton Colliery commenced, with all due ceremony, in October 1875. Trade, at the time, was in a poor state and the company was short of capital so work was suspended three years later not being resumed until March, 1882.

The colliery was owned by the Rother Vale Collieries Limited which was founded in the same year, bringing together the new workings with collieries at Fence and Orgreave. This became part of the United Steel Companies Limited following the end of World War I.

From its beginnings until 1965 Treeton worked the Barnsley seam and the High Hazels seam until the following year. After nationalisation it was decided to increase the output of the Wathwood seam and to reopen the Swallow Wood seam which had fallen into disuse in 1947. This came on stream in 1972 and lasted until the colliery closed on 7 December 1990. These two seams produced house coal.

== Rail connections ==
The colliery was situated adjacent to the North Midland Railway line at Treeton and connected with this. It was also connected to the Manchester, Sheffield and Lincolnshire Railway by a branch line which passed via Orgreave Colliery. Until May 1932 when storms caused parts of three bridges on the branch to be washed away the colliery was served by a Paddy Mail which operated at shift change times from Sheffield Victoria and Darnall to serve both Orgreave and Treeton. This train was involved in an accident in 1927.
