= Paddy mail =

Form of transport to take workers from their homes direct to work

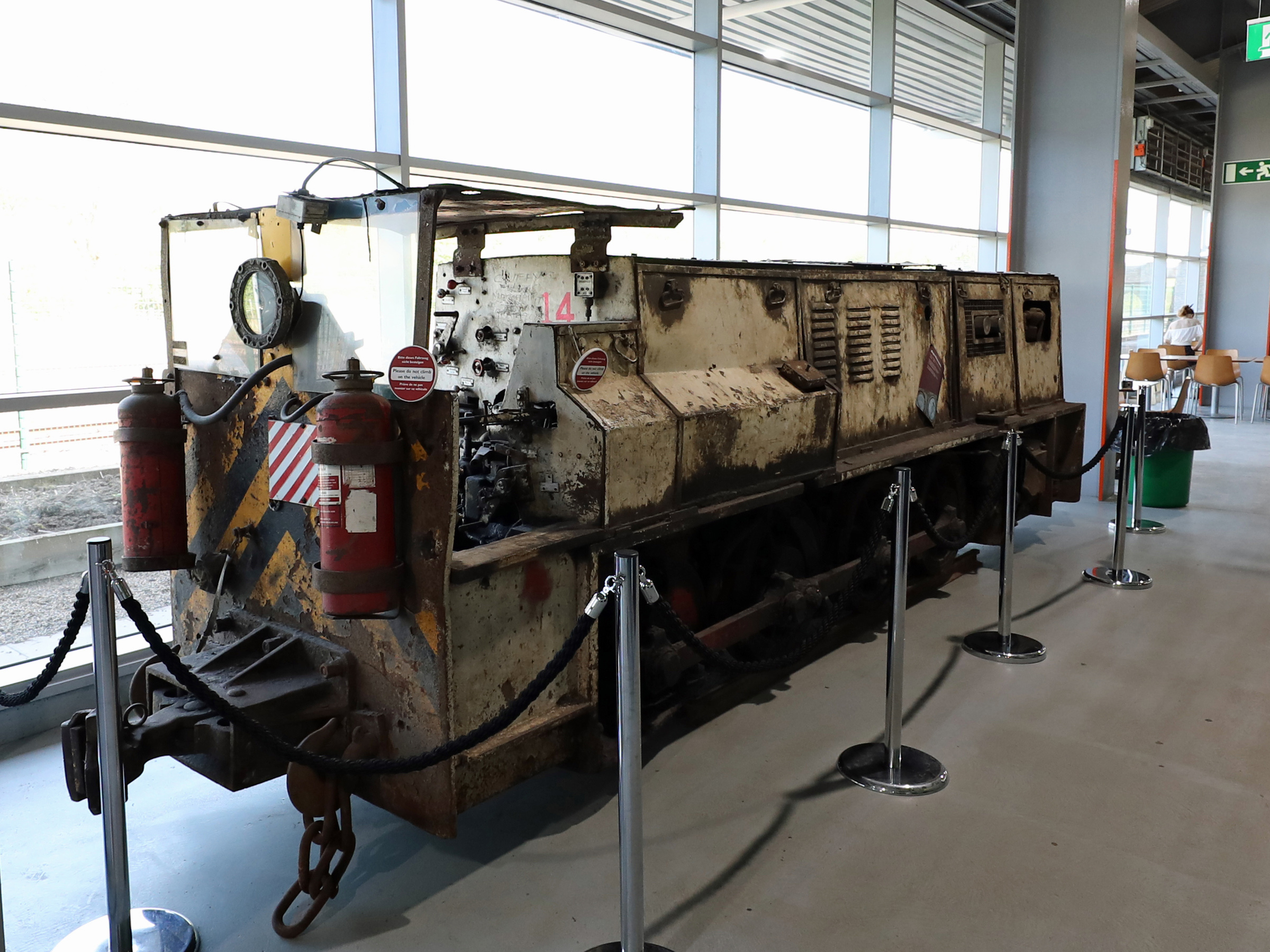
Paddy Train at the NRM Shildon; this had been located at Ellington Colliery in Northumberland before retirement

Paddy mails were workmen's trains operated by companies in Britain to transport workers from their "shanty villages" to their place of work or between the work sites.

Originally they were operated by railway contractors on temporary tracks laid to remove spoil from their workings. Many "navvies" were of Irish origin, hence the name given to the trains (see: Paddy).

Once the main line was built, the "Paddy mail" name passed to the workmen's specials, which in many cases were operated along the main line railways and sometimes operated by the main line companies to an exchange point where the trains were taken over by the industrial company.

In a time before the provision of pit-head baths it was illegal to travel in a normal service train in working clothes, so special trains were provided, usually of the railway company's most ancient coaches. There is a preserved example of such a vehicle from 1869 at the Midland Railway Centre at Butterley.

One much loved line was the Southwell Paddy.

Most of the services were terminated due to competition from motor buses in the 1930s. Since their main-line demise, the name has been applied to the underground man-riding trains which operate between the pit bottom and the working coal face.

== See also ==
- Birley Collieries
- Nunnery Colliery
- Orgreave Colliery
- Silverwood Colliery
- Treeton Colliery
