= Shireoaks Colliery =

- Location in Nottinghamshire
- Location: Nottinghamshire, Nottinghamshire, England; 53°19′19″N 1°09′50″W
- Products: Coal
- Opened: 1859
- Closed: 1990
- Company: Shireoaks Colliery Company; British Coal

Shireoaks Colliery was a coal mine situated on the edge of the village of Shireoaks, near Worksop in North Nottinghamshire, close by the Yorkshire border.

== History ==
The Duke of Newcastle owned mineral rights in much of North Nottinghamshire. A shaft was begun at Shireoaks in March 1854, and by February 1859, had reached a coal seam. Although the colliery was situated adjacent to the main line of the Manchester, Sheffield and Lincolnshire Railway, an agreement was reached with the railway company, as owners of the Chesterfield Canal, for a short link to serve the colliery and to ship coal to the River Trent at West Stockwith. Shireoaks Basin opened soon afterwards, and coal was shipped to Stockwith until 1949.

The Shireoaks Colliery Company was formally registered in December 1864 and, in due course, had mining interests throughout the area, including those at Whitwell, Clowne and Steetley, where it began sinking a shaft in May 1873. In 1896, the company employed 690 underground workers, with another 181 working on the surface.

In 1917 the colliery company gained a lease from the Estates of the 10th Duke of Leeds to mine top hard coal from below the villages of North Anston, South Anston and Thorpe Salvin. By 1923, the pit was producing some 1 million tons of manufacturing and steam coal per year, from the Top Hard or Barnsley Bed seams. There were 717 underground workers and 216 on the surface, but this was reduced from 1896, as the numbers reflected the workforce at both Shireoaks and Steetley. Ten years later, the numbers were 560 underground and 150 on the surface, with a further 460 and 70 working at Steetley. The returns for 1933 showed that the High Hazel seam was temporarily closed, but that the colliery was also producing household coal. By 1940, the Top Hard Barnsley and High Hazel seams were being worked.

In 1945, the Shireoaks Colliery Company was sold to United Steel Companies and on nationalisation came under the control of the National Coal Board (NCB). At that point, there were 589 underground workers and 160 surface workers at Shireoaks, with another 403 and 88 at Steetley. Together with Steetley, Shireoaks Colliery became part of the North East Division Number One Area of the NCB. Both pits were transferred to the South Yorkshire Area in March 1967, and were amalgamated in March 1983. This resulted in the closure of the surface works at Steetley, and all coal was brought up through the Shireoaks shafts. Reorganisation resulted in it becoming part of the South Yorkshire Group in April 1990, but this was short-lived, as it closed in May.

== After closure ==
In 1997, British Coal sold the colliery site to Nottinghamshire County Council. Aided by funding from English Partnerships, the council reclaimed the site, creating 64 acres (26 ha) of green space and 12 acres (5 ha) of development land. The colliery tip became woodland and grassland, and a network of public paths were created. Part of the site was designated as a Local Wildlife Site in 2012. In 2014, the council investigated selling the 12 acres of development land to the Friends of Woodlands & Coachwood Green Ltd, a community interest company who want to develop the land as a Local nature reserve and community asset. Shireoaks Basin has become a marina on the restored Chesterfield Canal.

== Bibliography ==
- Cumberlidge, Jane (2009). Inland Waterways of Great Britain (8th Ed.). Imray Laurie Norie and Wilson. ISBN 978-1-84623-010-3.
- Wain, Ken (2014). The Coal Mining Industry of Barnsley, Rotherham and Worksop. Amberley Publishing. ISBN 978-1-4456-3965-9.
