= Darnall railway station =

Railway station in South Yorkshire, England

Darnall
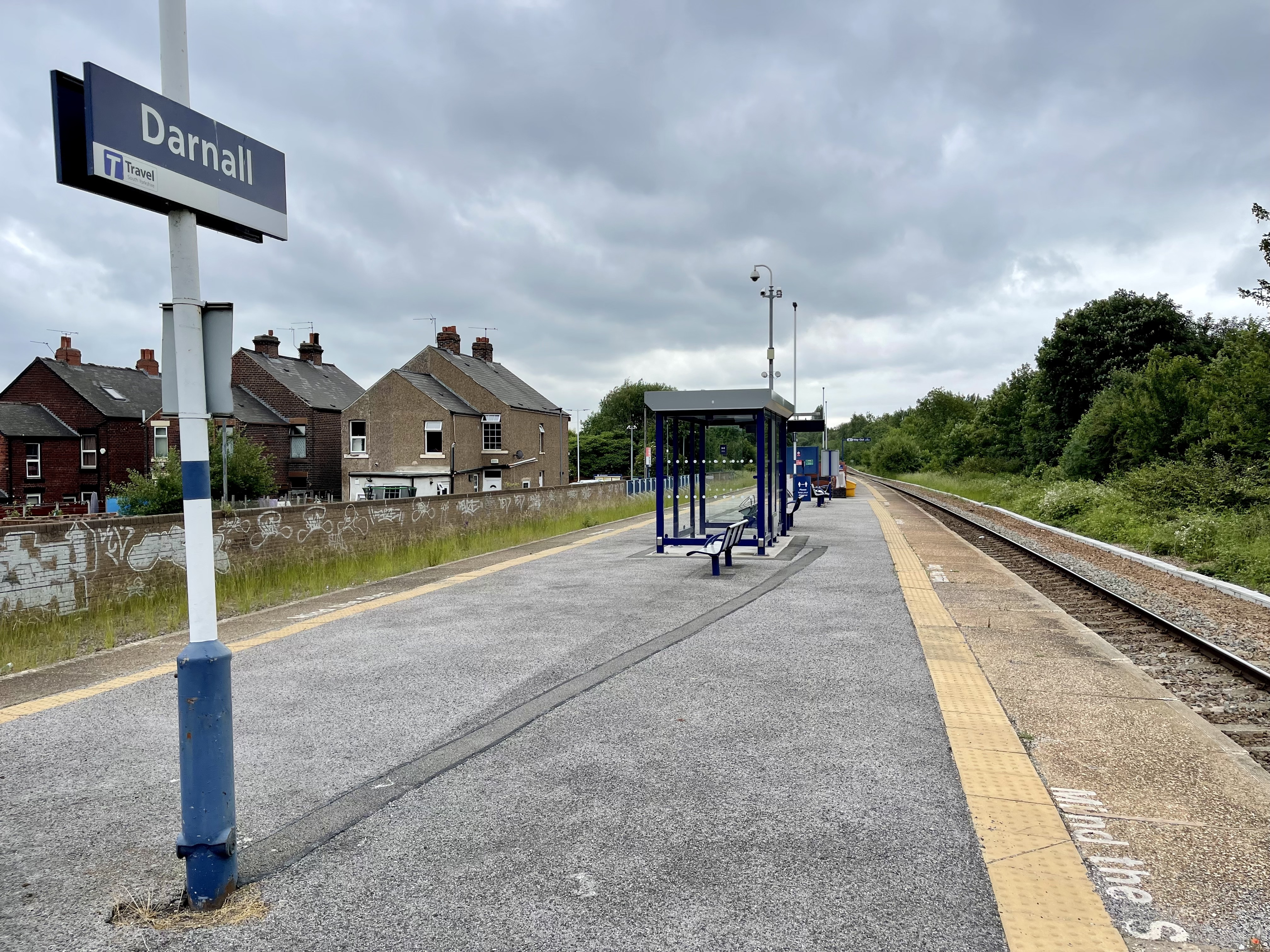
- The station in 2021

General information
- Location: Darnall, City of Sheffield; England
- Coordinates: 53.384500°N 1.412300°W
- Grid reference: SK391876
- Manager: Northern Trains
- Transit authority: Travel South Yorkshire
- Platforms: 2

Other information
- Station code: DAN
- Fare zone: Sheffield
- Classification: DfT category F2

History
- Opened: 12 February 1849; 177 years ago (as Darnal)

Key dates
- 1887: Renamed (Darnall)

Passengers
- 2021/22: ▲12,426
- 2022/23: ▲16,854
- 2023/24: ▲19,902
- 2024/25: ▲22,132
- 2025/26: ▼21,022
Location
Notes
- Passenger statistics from the Office of Rail and Road

Darnall railway station is on the Sheffield to Lincoln Line and was built in 1849 to serve Darnall, a community about 3 miles (5 km) from the centre of Sheffield, South Yorkshire, England, and which later became a suburb of the city.

As of March 2026, Darnall is the least used railway station in the county of South Yorkshire.

== History ==
The station was built by the Manchester, Sheffield and Lincolnshire Railway (M.S.& L.R.) with two platforms flanking the main lines. The main station building, on the Cleethorpes-bound side, contained the usual facilities, and was situated at the top of Station Road; a waiting shelter on the Sheffield-bound platform gave passengers some comfort. Widening took place in the area just before the First World War and two goods lines were laid around the back of the platforms. This was to increase capacity of the line and aid the movement of coal traffic towards Immingham Docks, opened in 1912. This work required the removal of Darnall tunnel about 0.75 miles (1.2 km) to the east of the station.

The tracks through Darnall were electrified from 1955 to 1981, though only to allow electrically hauled goods trains to reach Rotherwood Yard. There was also a chord line round to Attercliffe Junction on the former South Yorkshire Railway line towards Rotherham Central and Doncaster until the late 1980s - this was removed after the closure of the old Darnall West signal box in 1989.

== Present station ==
The station itself was rebuilt in 1928 to an island platform design, much favoured by the Great Central, which the M.S.& L.R. had become on the opening of its extension to London (Marylebone) in 1899. In this redesign the tracks in the centre of the layout, the "Down Main" (in the direction of Sheffield) and the "Up Goods" (in the direction of Cleethorpes) became the "Up" and "Down" main lines and served the platform faces; the original "Up Main" (in the direction of Cleethorpes) and the "Down Goods" (in the direction of Sheffield) became the "Up Goods" and "Down Goods" respectively.

Darnall was one of the first stations in the area to be destaffed since tickets are now sold on board. The station is a shadow of its former self, with just a simple waiting shelter on its platform. Passenger numbers are low and rumours of closure regularly circulate.

== Services ==
All services at Darnall are operated by Northern Trains.

The typical off-peak service in trains per hour is:

- 1 tph to Leeds via Sheffield
- 1 tph to Lincoln via Retford

On Sundays, the station is served by an hourly service between Lincoln and Sheffield, with some services continuing to Huddersfield.

Preceding station	National Rail	Following station
Sheffield	Northern Trains Sheffield to Lincoln Line	Woodhouse
	Historical railways	
Sheffield Victoria Line open, station closed	Great Central Railway Great Central Main Line	Woodhouse Line and station open
