= Orgreave, South Yorkshire =

Village and civil parish in South Yorkshire, England

Coordinates: 53.37012°N 1.37324°W

Orgreave
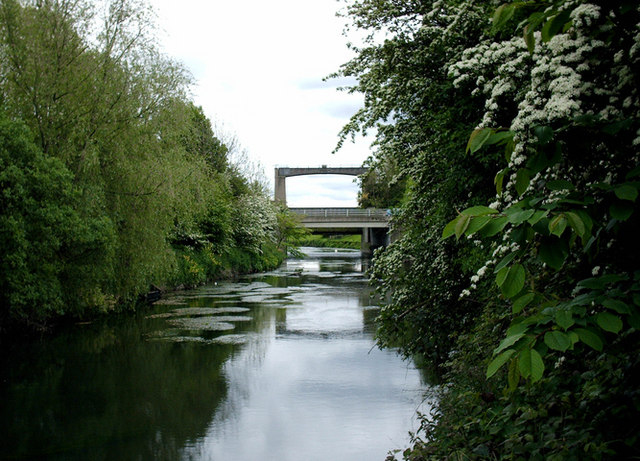
- The River Rother at Orgreave

- Location within South Yorkshire
- Population: 739 (2011 census)
- OS grid reference: SK425860
- Civil parish: Orgreave
- Metropolitan borough: Rotherham
- Metropolitan county: South Yorkshire
- Region: Yorkshire and the Humber
- Country: England
- Sovereign state: United Kingdom
- Post town: Sheffield
- Postcode district: S13
- Police: South Yorkshire
- Fire: South Yorkshire
- Ambulance: Yorkshire
- UK Parliament: Rother Valley

Orgreave is a village and civil parish on the River Rother in South Yorkshire. It is in the Metropolitan Borough of Rotherham, about 4.5 miles (7 km) east of the centre of Sheffield and a similar distance south of the centre of Rotherham.

The 2011 census recorded its population as 739. This is a slight decline since the 2001 census, which recorded its population as 761.

== History ==
=== Coal and coke ===
Two halls stood at Orgreave. Orgreave Hall was built in 1684 and occupied by John Sorsby of John Sorby & Sons. Rotherwood Hall was later occupied by his son Richard Sorsby (1806–1862), coal producer. The halls were demolished in the 1990s.

Coal mining in the area began with Dore House Colliery in 1820. The first shaft of Orgreave Colliery was sunk in 1851. In the 20th century the Orgreave Coking Plant was established, and the colliery began to supply the plant. The National Coal Board closed Orgreave Colliery in 1981.

In the 1984–85 miners' strike, National Union of Mineworkers members picketed the coking plant to prevent employees and coal from entering or products from leaving. On 18 June 1984, three and a half months into the strike, a large number of South Yorkshire Police officers, including mounted police, were deployed against the pickets. There was large-scale violence between police and pickets, which became known as the Battle of Orgreave.

The coking plant closed in 1991. In 1995, British Coal Opencast was authorised to remove the spoil tip of the former colliery and conduct opencast coal mining on a site totalling 700 acres (280 ha). BCO removed some 12 million tonnes of spoil, extracted coal from it, and also realigned almost 3/4 mile (1.2 km) of the River Rother. In 2005 BCO completed its work at Orgreave and handed over the land for redevelopment.

=== Redevelopment ===
100 acres (40 ha) of the site has been redeveloped as the Advanced Manufacturing Park. In 2008, Harworth Estates submitted a planning application to redevelop 300 acres (120 ha) as the Waverley community, which will include 4,000 homes and some commercial development. 222 acres (90 ha) is being restored as green space including recreation areas, parks, woods, three lakes and a reservoir.

Between 2012 and 2016, housebuilders Taylor Wimpey, Harron Homes and Barratt Homes delivered the first 500 homes on the site. In 2017, Avant became the fourth housebuilder on site, purchasing two plots of land to build a total of 281 homes, and in the same year, Taylor Wimpey purchased further land to build another 130 new homes. In 2019 Harworth sold the latest residential phase to Barratt Homes to build 177 new homes.

Waverley Junior Academy, located within the redeveloped area, is operated by Aston Community Education Trust.

At the same time further land reclamation activities had increased the size of the Advanced Manufacturing Park to 150 acres (61 ha).
