= Boythorpe Viaduct =

Railway viaduct in Chesterfield, England

- Coordinates: 53°13′56.3″N 1°25′44.77″W
- Carries: Ex-Lancashire, Derbyshire and East Coast Railway
- Crosses: Midland Railway's Brampton Branch Line
- Locale: Chesterfield, Derbyshire

Characteristics
- Design: 2 brick arches and 2 spans
- Width: Twin Standard Gauge Rail

History
- Opened: February 1897
- Closed: March 1957

Location
- Interactive map of Boythorpe Viaduct

Boythorpe Viaduct was a railway viaduct in Chesterfield, England.

== Description ==
The viaduct had two spans and two arches, which carried the LD&ECR's Chesterfield Market Place to Lincoln Central double track main line over the Midland Railway's "Brampton Branch" and the industrial "Boythorpe Railway" a few hundred yards East of Chesterfield Market Place Station.

Photographs of the viaduct are rare and mentions in the literature even rarer, the clearest are collected on a DVD, repeated by Booth. An image taken between closure and demolition is on the internet. The viaduct lay approximately one third of the way between the Park Road brick arch bridge and Horns Bridge with embankments separating the three structures.

== History ==
The viaduct was opened in 1897 along with the rest of the line.

The section between Chesterfield and Langwith Junction (by then renamed Shirebrook North), was closed to passenger traffic by British Railways in December 1951, due to the unsafe condition of Bolsover Tunnel and concerns over the safety of Doe Lea Viaduct, both of which were affected by colliery subsidence. Bolsover South and Scarcliffe were closed completely.

Boythorpe Viaduct remained in use until March 1957 when goods traffic to and from Chesterfield Market Place Station ceased. Tracks were lifted over the structure in the next two years.

No trace remains of the viaduct, or indeed of any of the massive LD&ECR presence to the West of the Midland Main Line at what is now the Horns Bridge roundabout. The Brampton Branch outlived the LD&ECR, but is now no more, as is the Boythorpe Railway.
