= Arkwright Town railway station =

Former railway station in Derbyshire, England

Arkwright Town
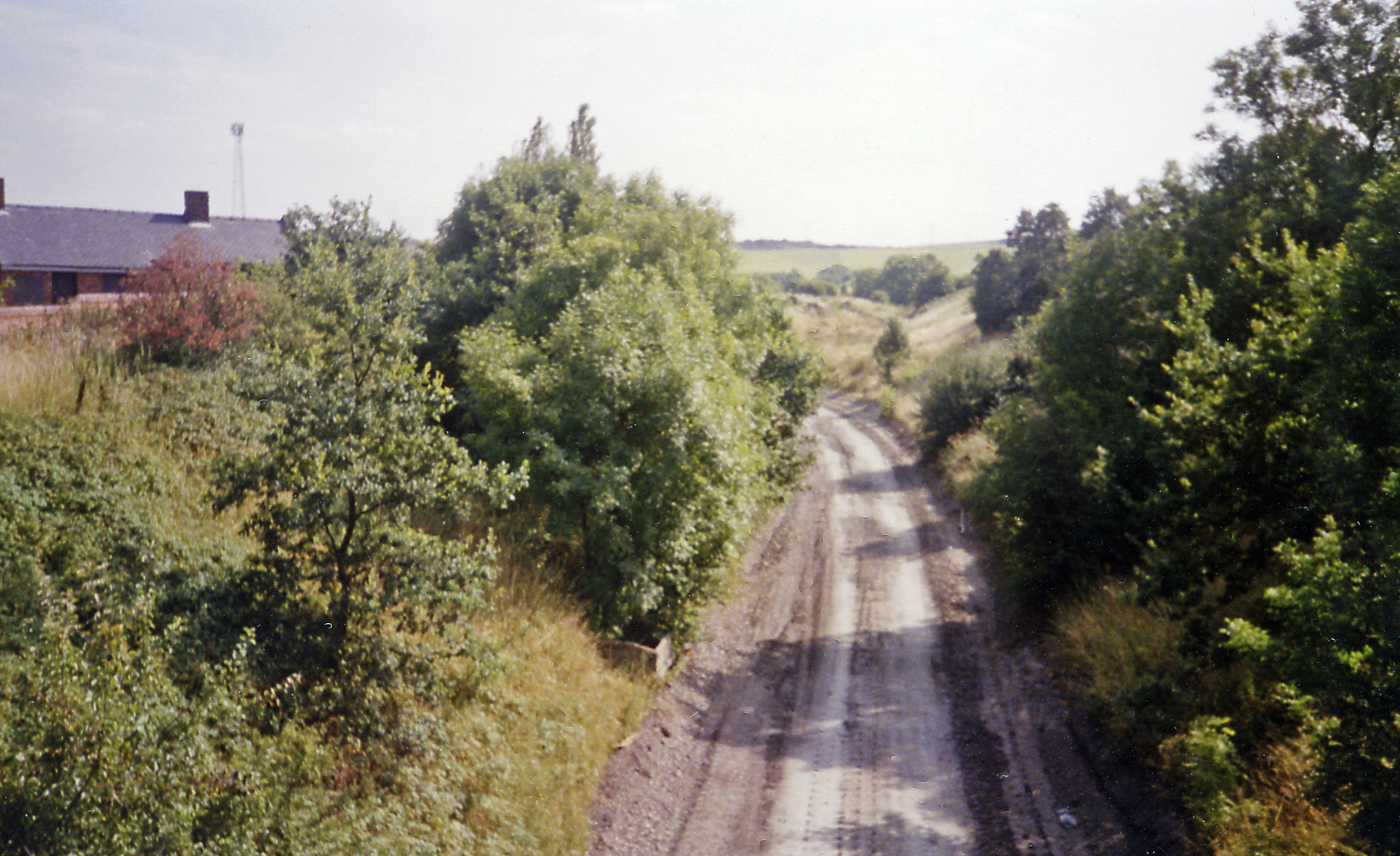
- Site of the station in 1993

General information
- Location: Arkwright Town, North East Derbyshire; England
- Coordinates: 53.2306°N 1.3598°W
- Grid reference: SK 428 705
- Platforms: 2

Other information
- Status: Disused

History
- Original company: Lancashire, Derbyshire and East Coast Railway
- Pre-grouping: Great Central Railway
- Post-grouping: London and North Eastern Railway

Key dates
- 8 March 1897: Station opened
- 3 December 1951: Closed to passengers
- 2 February 1963: Closed completely
Location

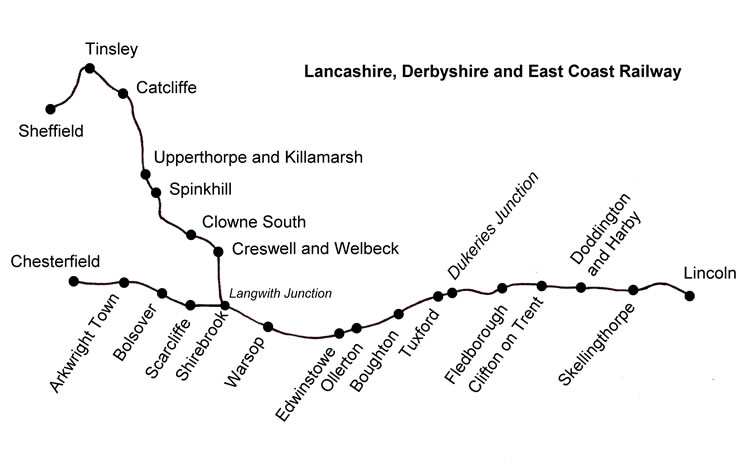
LD&ECR and Sheffield District Railway

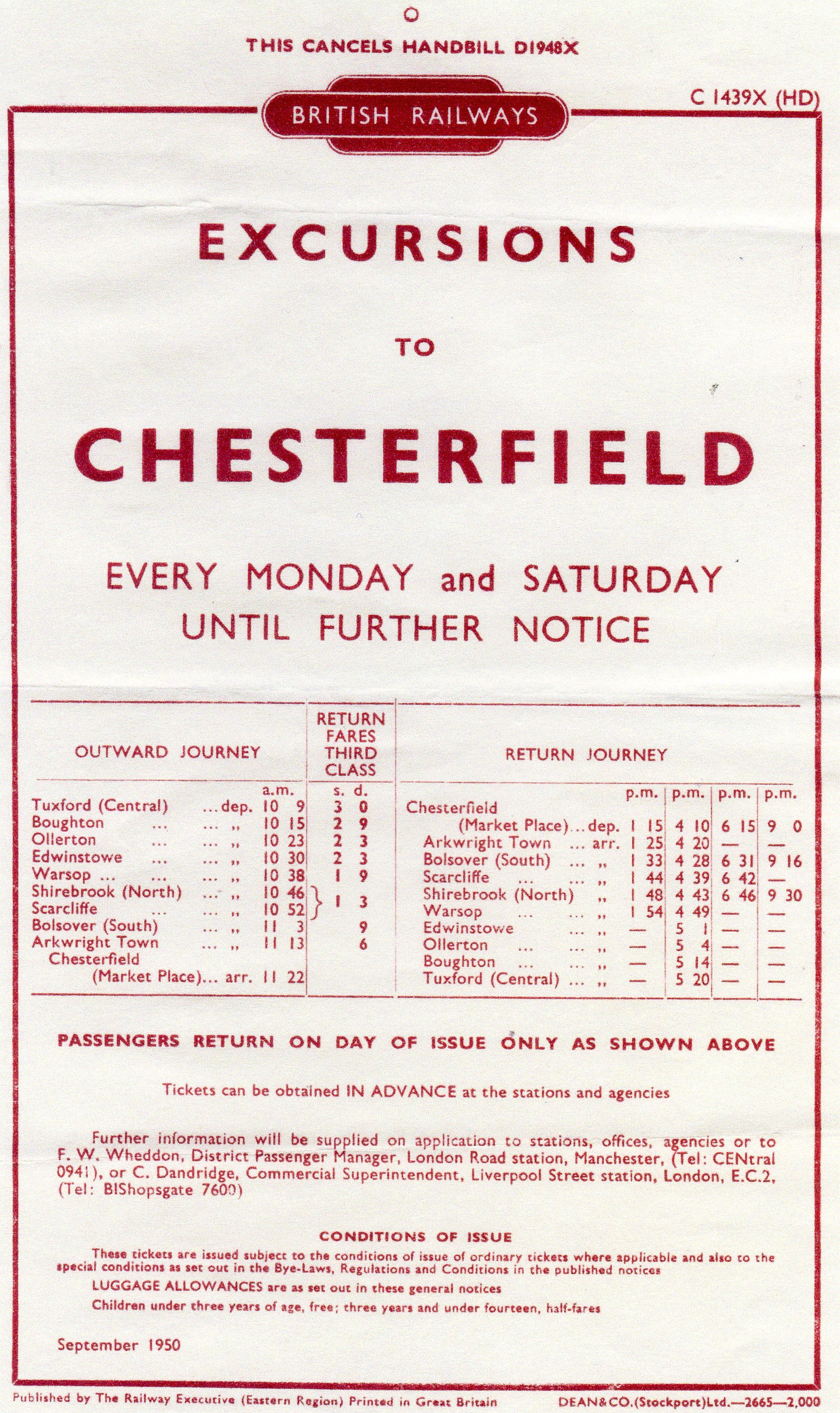
1950 Excursion Advert

Arkwright Town railway station was in Arkwright Town, Derbyshire, England.

== History ==
The line and station were opened by the LD&ECR in March 1897. The company struggled financially and was absorbed by the GCR in 1907 which in turn became part of the LNER at the Grouping of 1923. The station then passed to British Railways on nationalisation in 1948, only to be closed to passenger traffic in 1951 and closed completely on 2 February 1963.

The station was originally to have been called Duckmanton, and tickets bearing that name were issued but the Staveley Company objected. Perhaps the name Arkwright Town was used from the start, but the stock of tickets bearing "Duckmanton" was used rather than wasted.

The lines through the station ran from West to East. West of the station lay, from the west, Duckmanton Tunnel and Cutting, the GCR main line (which ran North to South from Sheffield Victoria to London Marylebone) and a bridge carrying the road to Sutton which still stands, albeit infilled underneath. In 1938 Arkwright Colliery was opened and a siding was squeezed in to serve it, turning sharply south between the GCR main line and Sutton Road.

East of the station was Arkwright Town Junction which was installed by the GCR in 1907. It led off the LD&ECR main line via a complex set of curves to the GCR main line. This meant that the village of Arkwright Town (it has never been more than a village, despite the name) was completely surrounded by railways.

The last passenger train to call at the station was an enthusiasts' special on 17 June 1961 formed of a two carriage Diesel Multiple Unit. By 1973 the station had been razed to the ground. The station was built in the LD&ECR's standard modular style, as was the Stationmaster's House.

Trains continued to pass the station site until the colliery closed in 1988 and the stockpile was cleared. Arkwright Colliery was subsequently opencasted then landscaped. The opencasted coal was taken away by lorry, a narrative given in detail under Arkwright Town Junction. The landscaping has removed all trace of the station, the colliery and the railway east of the GCR Main Line, opening vistas from (for example) the Sutton Road never seen in the 20th Century.

A mile east of Arkwright Town Junction was Markham Junction for the, now closed, Bolsover and Markham Number 1 collieries. Housing for the railway's employees was provided by the main Chesterfield to Bolsover Road (A632) next to that branch. The buildings remain. They were built in the LD&ECR's distinctive standard architecture and are known as "Railway Cottages."

The next station was Bolsover South after crossing the Doe Lea Viaduct which, though strongly built, suffered from coal mining subsidence, as did many of the lines in the area.

| Preceding station | Disused railways | Following station |
|---|---|---|
| Chesterfield Market Place; Line and station closed | Great Central Railway; Lancashire, Derbyshire and East Coast Railway | Bolsover South; Line and station closed |
