= Duckmanton Tunnel =

Railway tunnel in Derbyshire, England

Coordinates: 53°13′44.2″N 1°22′1.3″W

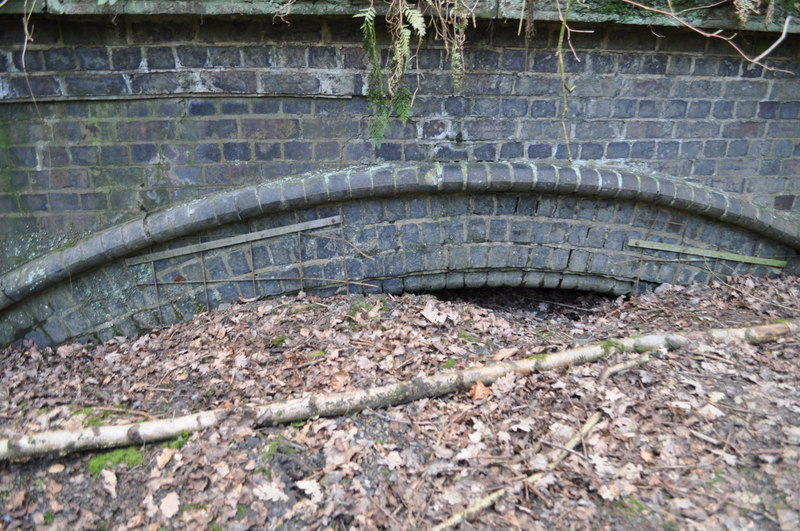
Duckmanton tunnel

Duckmanton Tunnel is a former 501-yard (458-metre) long twin-track railway tunnel between Chesterfield and Arkwright Town in Derbyshire, England.

== History ==
The tunnel was opened by the LD&ECR (later part of the GCR and subsequently the LNER) in March 1897. As originally planned, this was a highly ambitious scheme, but only the central section between Chesterfield Market Place and Lincoln, together with a branch from Langwith Junction to the outskirts of Sheffield, were ever built.

The section between Chesterfield and Langwith Junction (by then renamed Shirebrook North), was closed to passenger traffic by British Railways in December 1951. Bolsover South and Scarcliffe stations were closed completely. The section from Chesterfield Market Place through the tunnel to Arkwright Town was singled, but remained open to goods traffic until March 1957 after which the tunnel became redundant.

Tracks through the tunnel were duly lifted and the tunnel itself was infilled in the 1970s. The tunnel's eastern approach cutting ("Duckmanton Cutting") remained in use by trains serving Arkwright Colliery. They had to run into the cutting then reverse into the colliery and vice versa on exit.

In 1981 this complicated, and therefore costly, arrangement was ended by re-routing the tracks away from Duckmanton Junction to run directly into the colliery, making the approach cutting redundant for railway purposes, so the tracks were duly lifted. The colliery closed in 1988.

== Rebirth ==
This previously insignificant cutting subsequently gained international recognition as a Site of Special Scientific Interest (SSSI) and as such is now heavily protected by law. It is managed by Derbyshire Wildlife Trust specifically for its geology. In chronostratigraphy, the British sub-stage of the Carboniferous period, the 'Duckmantian' derives its name from the study of the geological exposures in this cutting.
