= LD&ECR Class C =

Class of six British locomotives

LD&ECR class C LNER Class G3
Type and origin
- Power type: Steam
- Designer: Kitson & Co.
- Builder: Kitson & Co.
- Serial number: 3658–61, 3867–68
- Build date: 1897–98
- Total produced: 6
Specifications
- Configuration
  - Whyte: 0-4-4T
  - UIC: B2′ n2t
- Gauge: 4 ft 8 1/2 in (1,435 mm)
- Driver dia.: 4 ft 6 in (1.372 m)
- Trailing dia.: 3 ft 0 in (0.914 m)
- Length: 30 ft 0.75 in (9.163 m)
- Loco weight: 50 long tons 0 cwt (112,000 lb or 50.8 t)
- Fuel type: Coal
- Fuel capacity: 2 long tons 0 cwt (4,500 lb or 2 t)
- Water cap.: 1,300 imp gal (5,900 L; 1,600 US gal)
- Boiler pressure: 160 lbf/in^{2} (1.10 MPa)
- Heating surface: 961 sq ft (89.3 m^{2})
- Cylinders: Two, inside
- Cylinder size: 17 in × 24 in (432 mm × 610 mm)
Performance figures
- Tractive effort: 14,292 lbf (63.57 kN)
Career
- Operators: Lancashire, Derbyshire and East Coast Railway; → Great Central Railway; → London and North Eastern Railway
- Class: LD&ECR: C; LNER: G3
- Numbers: LD&ECR: 13–18; GCR: 1169, 1148B–1152B; (1169 → 1169B in 1917); LNER: 6407–6402
- Withdrawn: 1931–1935
- Disposition: All scrapped

The LD&ECR class C (LNER Class G3) was a class of 0-4-4T steam locomotives of the Lancashire, Derbyshire and East Coast Railway.

Six were built in 1897–98. They were the LD&ECR's only true passenger locomotives. They normally ran between Chesterfield Market Place and Lincoln and occasionally to the Midland Railway station in Sheffield. In later years five moved to the Sheffield area, with one transferring to Ardsley.

All were scrapped between 1931 and 1935.
