= Langwith Junction =

Area of Shirebrook in Derbyshire, England

Coordinates: 53.210°N 1.211°W

Langwith Junction is a suburb of Shirebrook, in Derbyshire, England. Its name derives from the former Shirebrook North railway station, which was on the now-defunct Lancashire, Derbyshire and East Coast Railway. It forms one of the six Langwith villages.
