= J60 =

J60 may refer to:

- HMS Dundalk (J60), a Hunt-class minesweeper of the Royal Navy
- HMS Jan van Gelder (J60), a Jan van Amstel-class minesweeper of the Royal Navy
- LNER Class J60, a British steam locomotive class
- Metabiaugmented dodecahedron
- Pratt & Whitney J60, a turbojet engine
- Toyota Land Cruiser (J60), a Japanese off-road vehicle
