= Scarcliffe railway station =

Former railway station in Derbyshire, England

Scarcliffe

General information
- Location: Bolsover; England
- Coordinates: 53.2109°N 1.2518°W
- Grid reference: SK 500 684
- Platforms: 2 (Island)

Other information
- Status: Disused

History
- Original company: LD&ECR
- Pre-grouping: Great Central Railway
- Post-grouping: LNER; British Railways

Key dates
- 3 January 1898: Opened
- 3 December 1951: Closed
Location

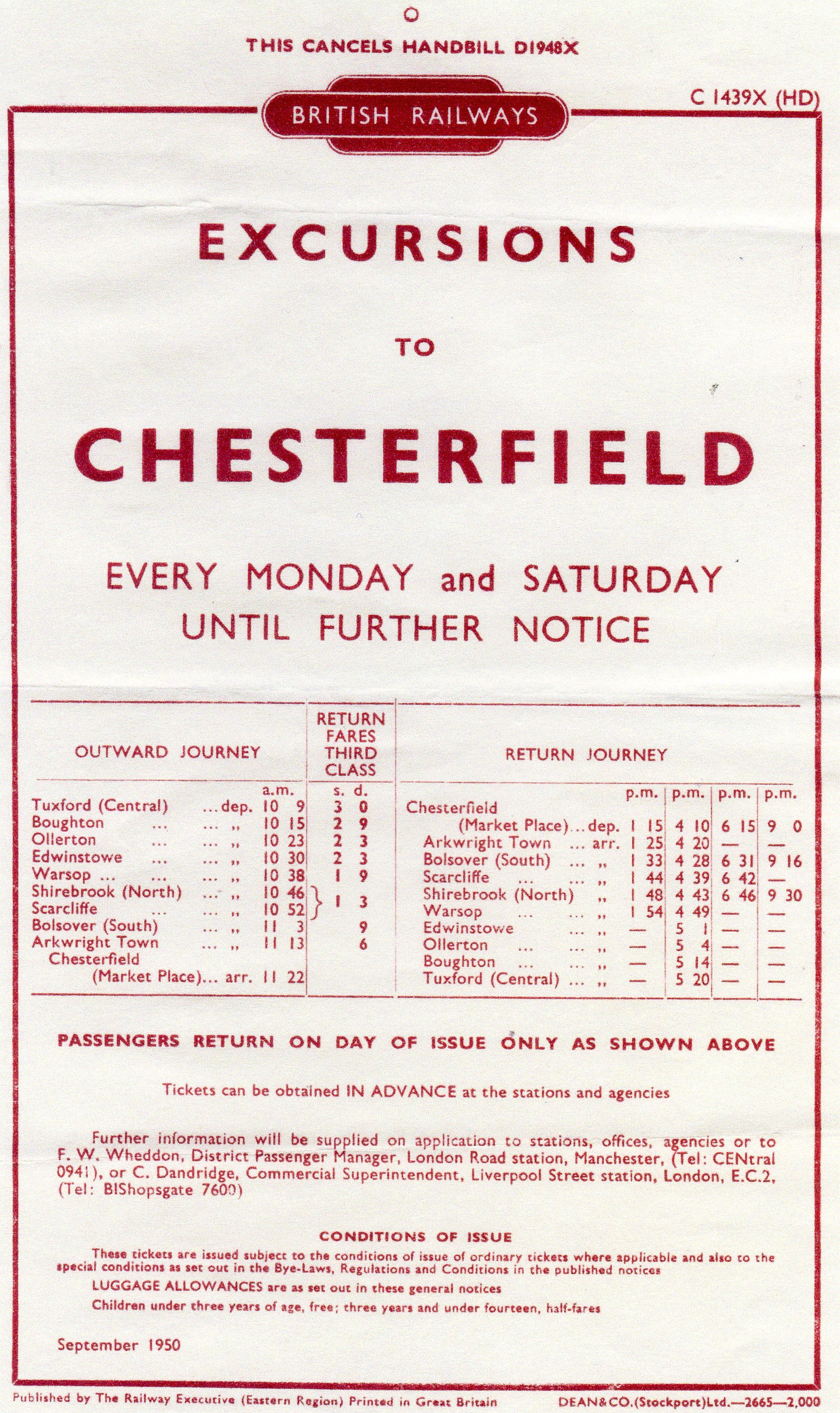
1950 Excursion Advert

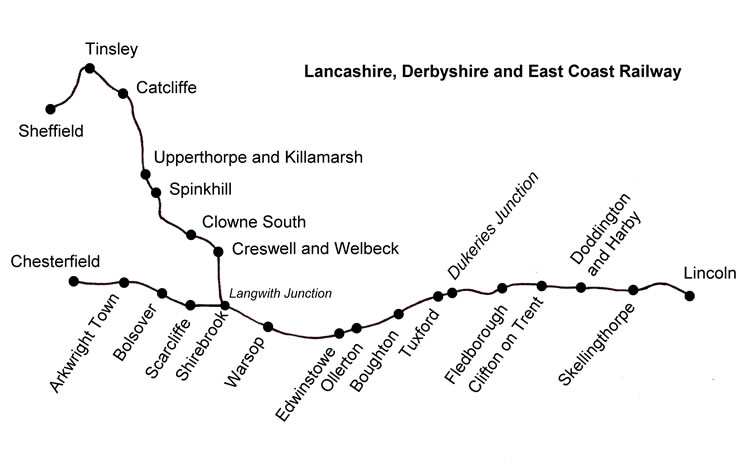
LD&ECR and Sheffield District Railway

Scarcliffe railway station is a former railway station in Scarcliffe, Derbyshire, England.

== History ==
The line was opened by the Lancashire, Derbyshire and East Coast Railway (later part of the Great Central Railway and subsequently the LNER) in March 1897. Scarcliffe was opened on 3 January the following year.

As originally planned, this was a highly ambitious scheme, as its name suggests, but only two sections were ever built: the main line between Chesterfield Market Place and Lincoln Central, together with a branch from Langwith Junction to join the Sheffield District Railway at Beighton, thereby finding its way to Sheffield Midland.

Scarcliffe station was built at the summit of the line, 521 feet (159 m) above sea level. It was a few hundred yards from the eastern entrance of the 2,624-yard (2,399-metre) Bolsover Tunnel. Eastwards, the line fell at 1 in 100 to Langwith Junction. A short distance to the east of the station, in woods on the south side the tracks was a railway-owned reservoir, fed by the River Poulter which rose at Palterton. This reservoir served the seven water columns at Langwith Junction engine shed and station via a 3" main beside the tracks.

The station was an "island" structure with two platforms, the only other LD&ECR station with this layout was at Dukeries Junction, upper level.

By 1922 six trains called at Scarcliffe in each direction, Monday to Friday. with two extra on Saturday. There was no Sunday service.

The section between Chesterfield and Langwith Junction (by then renamed Shirebrook North), was closed to passenger traffic by British Railways in December 1951, due to the unsafe condition of Bolsover Tunnel and concern over the condition of Doe Lea Viaduct near Carr Vale. Bolsover South and Scarcliffe were closed completely. Track lifting commenced immediately and was completed within weeks. Goods traffic continued from Chesterfield Market Place until March 1957 and from Arkwright Town until 1963.

The station has been razed to the ground, but the characteristic LD&ECR Stationmaster's house survives as a private dwelling.

A very fine collection of photographs of Scarcliffe Station taken in 1948-51 by the late Trevor Skirrey, onetime Scarcliffe signalman, line the walls of the "Elm Tree" public house at the end of Station Road in the village of Scarcliffe. Two genres of photographs of Scarcliffe Station have been published, one from its early years and one from its twilight. The early ones are posed scenes of Stationmaster Lund and his young family standing proudly on their quintessentially rural station. In the later ones, led by Skirrey, Priestley and Buckley, the setting and scenery are unchanged, industry has not touched Scarcliffe even in 2013.

Preceding station	Disused railways	Following station
Bolsover South; Line and station closed	Great Central Railway; Lancashire, Derbyshire and East Coast Railway	Shirebrook North; Line and station closed
