= Shirebrook North railway station =

Former railway station in Derbyshire, England

Shirebrook North
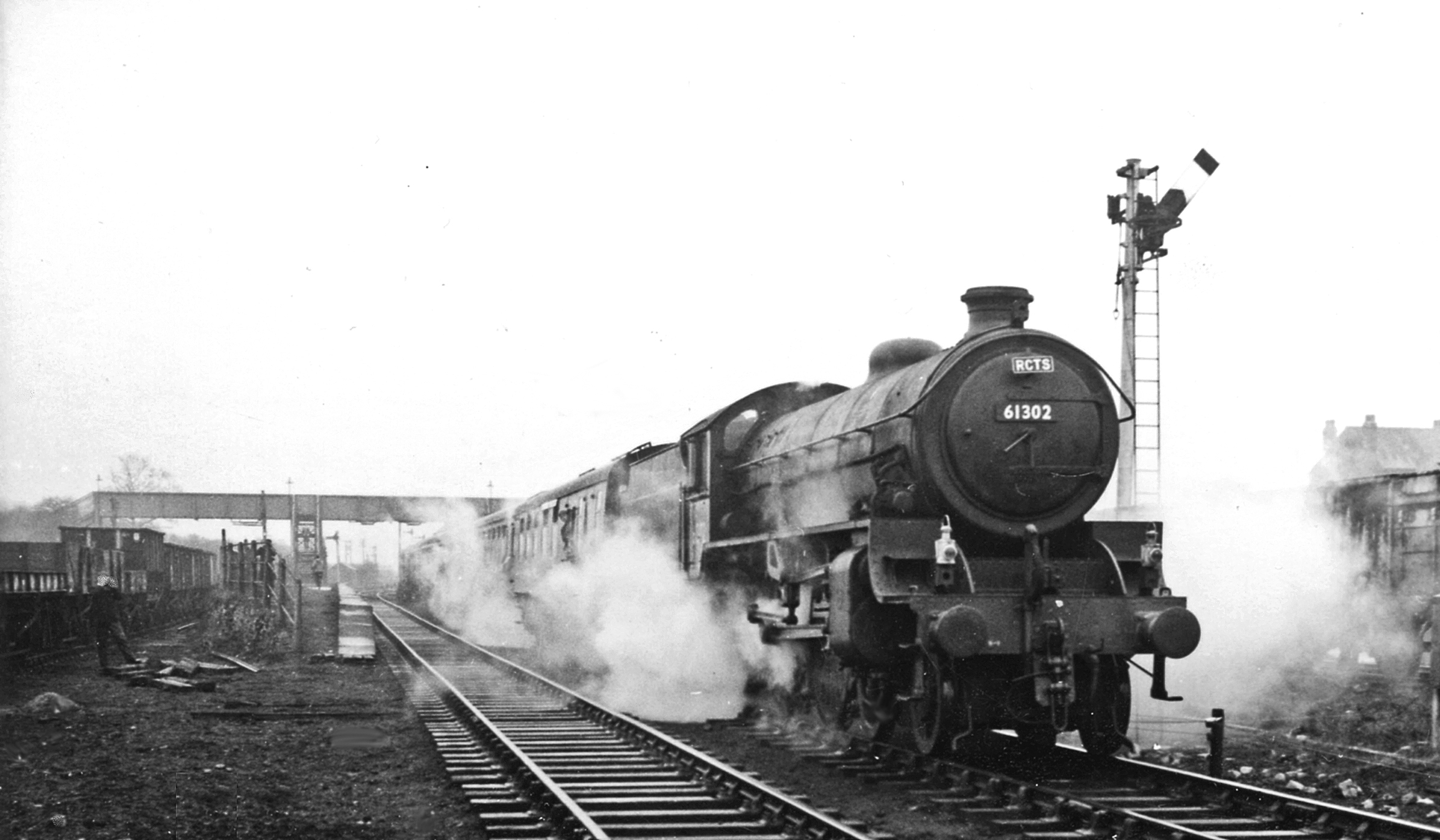

General information
- Location: Langwith Junction, Bolsover; England
- Coordinates: 53.2127°N 1.2120°W
- Grid reference: SK 525 688
- Platforms: 4

Other information
- Status: Disused

History
- Original company: LD&ECR
- Pre-grouping: Great Central Railway
- Post-grouping: LNER; British Railways

Key dates
- 8 March 1897: Opened as Langwith Junction
- 2 June 1924: renamed Shirebrook North
- 17 September 1955: closed for regular passenger traffic
- 5 September 1964: Summer excursions ended
- 5 December 1964: Closed completely
Location

Shirebrook North railway station was a railway station serving the town of Shirebrook in Derbyshire, England. It was on the Lancashire, Derbyshire and East Coast Railway running from Chesterfield to Lincoln. The station was also on the former Shirebrook North to Nottingham Victoria Line and the Sheffield District Railway. The station has since been demolished and housing now occupies parts of the site with some stub rails nearby serving a train scrapper.

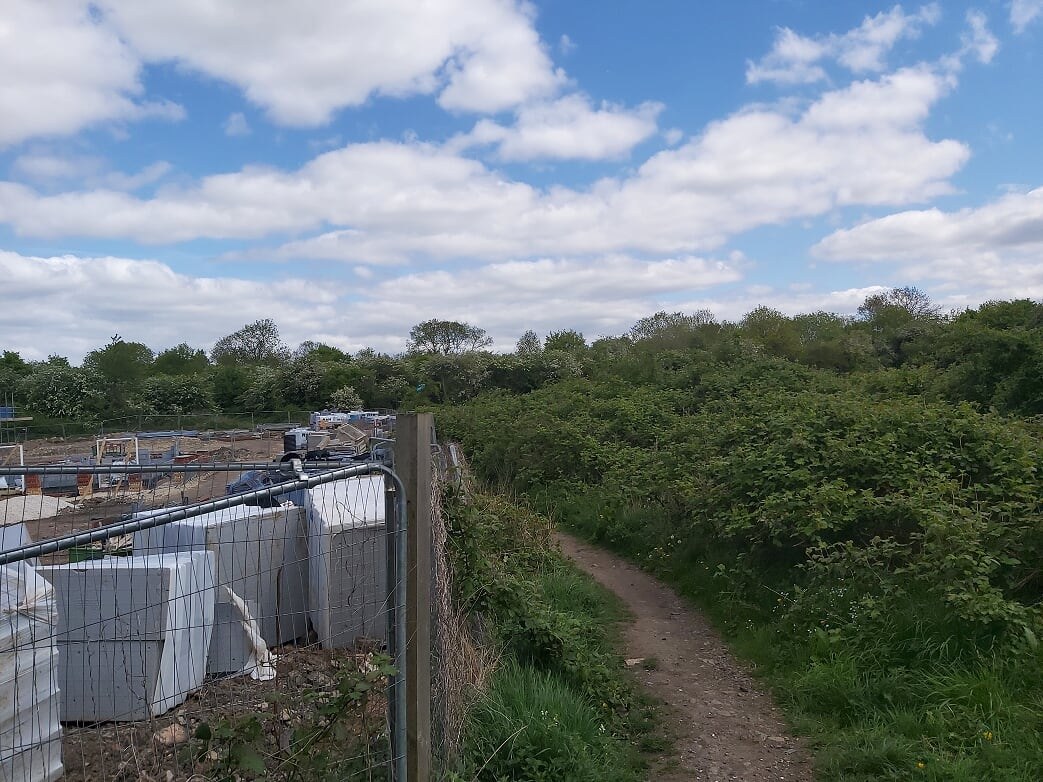
Site of Shirebrook North in 2020

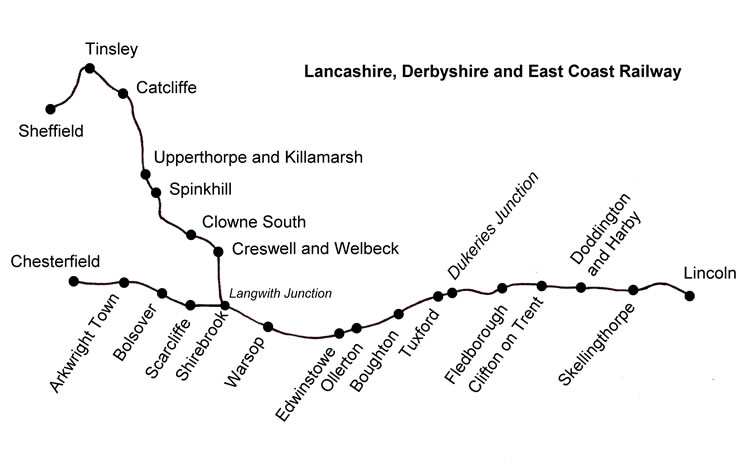
LD&ECR and Sheffield District Railway

== Ambiguity ==
There have been four separate stations with "Shirebrook" in their names:

- Shirebrook North which is the subject of this article
- Shirebrook South,
- Shirebrook Colliery (later renamed Shirebrook Colliery Sidings) for colliery workmen's trains only, and
- Shirebrook station which is on the Robin Hood Line.

Shirebrook South, Shirebrook Colliery Sidings and Shirebrook North have been closed for many years. Shirebrook West closed in 1964 but reopened in 1998 as plain "Shirebrook". Shirebrook West was actually on the eastern edge of the village.

Shirebrook North railway station is a former railway station in Langwith Junction, Derbyshire, England.

== History ==
=== The starting position ===
The station was opened by the Lancashire, Derbyshire and East Coast Railway (later part of the GCR and subsequently the LNER) in March 1897 and was closed to regular passenger traffic by British Railways in September 1955.

The station was originally called Langwith Junction, and gave this name to the adjacent steam locomotive shed and the settlement that grew up around it, although the station was renamed as "Shirebrook North" on 2 June 1924, despite not being in Shirebrook. It was located on the LD&ECR line between Chesterfield Market Place and Lincoln Central. A branch ran north-west via Clowne to meet the Midland Railway near Beighton, on the outskirts of Sheffield, originally with the aim of running on the MS&LR - later Great Central - line into Sheffield Victoria. That company rejected the idea and, for a time, it led to a goods depot at Beighton, until it was linked with the Sheffield District Railway in 1900, giving access to The Midland Railway station at Sheffield. The line to Sheffield was occasionally called "The Sheffield Branch" but far more commonly The Beighton Branch.

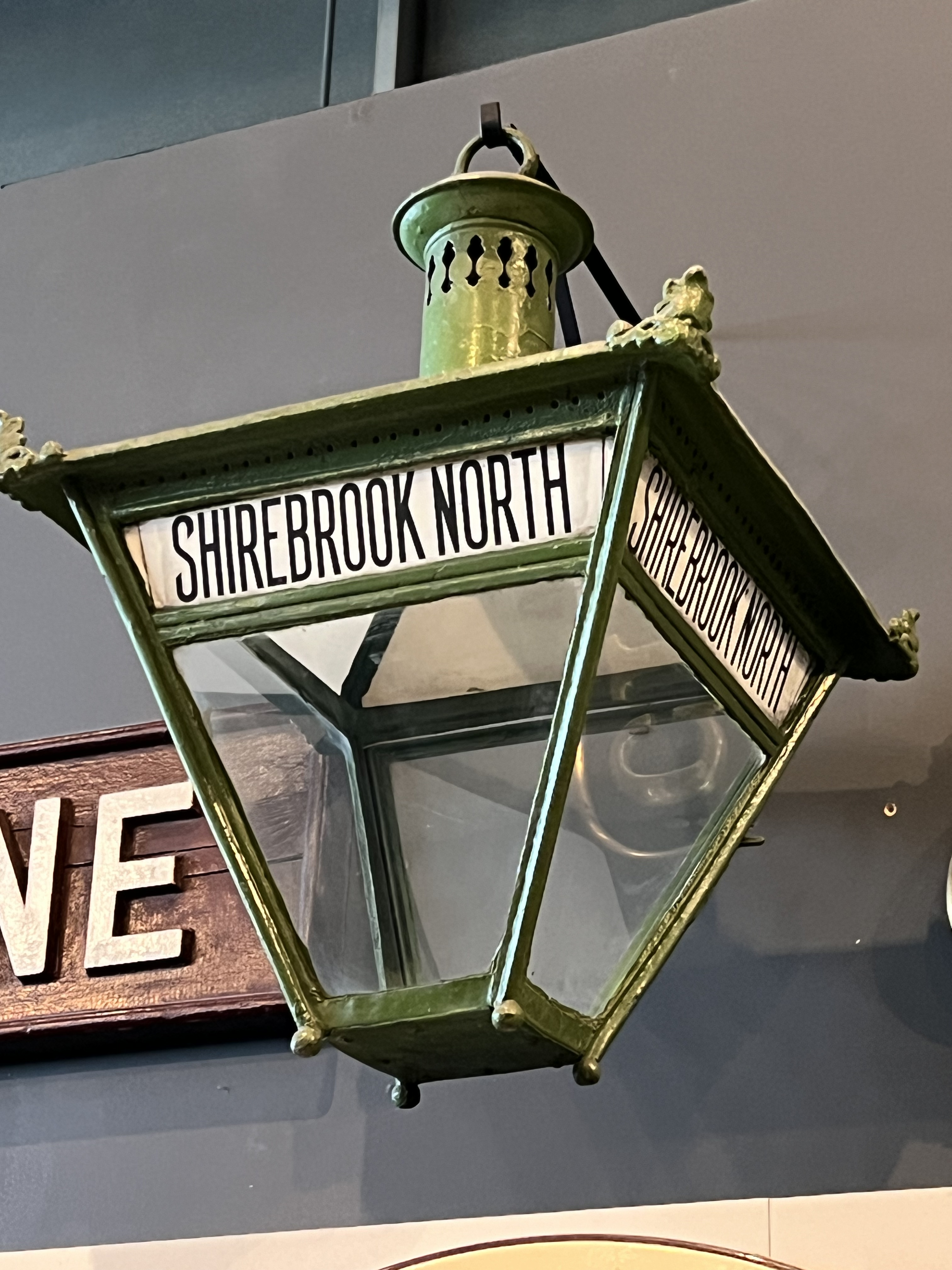
Lamp in the collection at Thinktank, Birmingham Science Museum

The station had four platforms and was one of the three with a refreshment room, the others being Chesterfield Market Place and Edwinstowe. The signalmen would warn passengers of the arrival of a train by ringing a bell. The main station building was in the line's standard modular style.

Langwith Junction and Halwill Junction on the Devon/Cornwall border are the only two place names (as opposed to station names) in Britain including the word "Junction."

=== Service enhancements ===
In November 1901 the Great Northern Railway's "Leen Valley Extension" line arrived from Sutton-in-Ashfield, Pleasley and its own Shirebrook station, later known as Shirebrook South. Passenger trains plied that route from Nottingham Victoria to Shirebrook, but terminated at Shirebrook South until 1925, despite Shirebrook North being only a mile further on. From 1925 these trains were extended to Shirebrook North, but the writing was already on the wall.

The LD&ECR had plans for its own branch to Mansfield but gave them up and built curves into the Midland Railway line from Nottingham to Worksop, converging at Shirebrook Junction. For reasons lost in time these were known locally as "The New Found Out". During the First World War the GCR promoted the building of the Mansfield Railway which connected with the ex-LD&ECR Main Line at Clipstone. This enabled trains from Shirebrook North to head east through Warsop then turn south to Mansfield Central. Thus, at its zenith, regular timetabled passenger trains left Shirebrook North in five directions to six destinations:

- West to Chesterfield Market Place, first stop Scarcliffe
- North West to Sheffield, first stop Creswell and Welbeck
- East to Lincoln Central, first stop Warsop
- East to Mansfield Central, first stop Warsop, then turning down the Mansfield Railway
- South East to Mansfield (ex-MR), first stop Shirebrook (later renamed Shirebrook West) and
- SSE to Nottingham Victoria, first stop Shirebrook (later renamed Shirebrook South.)

A notable feature was the care taken to timetable Sheffield-Mansfield services along the Beighton Branch to connect with Chesterfield-Lincoln services along the main line. At 10:44, for example, all four platforms would have a train:

- Platform 1 : 10:46 to Chesterfield Market Place (from Lincoln)
- Platform 2 : 10:46 to Lincoln (from Chesterfield)
- Platform 3 : 10:50 to Sheffield Midland via the Beighton Branch, and
- Platform 4 : 10:45 to Mansfield (ex-MR, later renamed Mansfield Town).

Anyone catching the last weekday departure from Chesterfield, the 19:00 to Mansfield Central, could stay in his or her seat at Shirebrook North and arrive at Mansfield Central at 19:50 or change trains and arrive at Mansfield Town at 19:40.

For seven years from 1903 the Sheffield-Mansfield service was formed of LD&ECR stock hauled by Midland Railway locomotives.

Five routes, six destinations, an engine shed, a wagon works, a goods shed and sidings led to complex trackwork. This was controlled by Langwith Junction signalbox which stood in the "V" of the original junction of the Chesterfield and Beighton lines. The Class 1 rated 'box was staffed 24/7 until its dying years when it was closed on Sundays.

== Decline ==
=== Passenger services ===
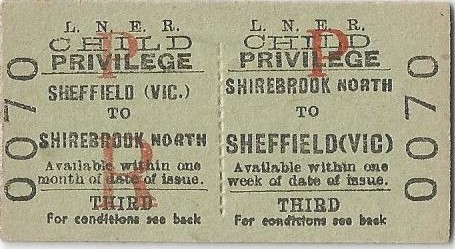

Shirebrook North was closed to regular passenger traffic in stages.

First to go was the last to arrive, i.e. SSE to Nottingham Victoria via Shirebrook South. This lasted only from 1925 to 1931, though timetabled Summer weekend services and excursions continued until 1964.

Next was NW-SE from Sheffield along the Beighton Branch via Creswell and Welbeck through Shirebrook North to Mansfield ex-MR via Shirebrook West, which closed abruptly on 10 September 1939. Timetabled Summer weekend services, excursions and diversions along the Beighton Branch continued until 1964, but the "New Found Out" curves joining the LD&EC lines east of Shirebrook North to the Midland's Worksop-Nottingham line were lifted between 1946 and 1950.

Services west to Chesterfield Market Place ended on 3 December 1951. The sparse traffic made the £1 million (1951 prices) cost of repairing Bolsover Tunnel, plus uncosted concerns over the Doe Lea Viaduct west of Bolsover South hopelessly uneconomic. Track between Markham Junction (between Bolsover and Arkwright Town) and a few hundred yards west of Shirebrook North was lifted immediately. The remaining yards of track west of Shirebrook North were used as a headshunt and a wagon store for several years.

The Mansfield Central service is shown in the August 1939 Bradshaw's Guide, but was not mentioned when Mansfield Central closed to regular passenger services in January 1956.

The remaining Monday to Saturday service ran between Shirebrook North and Lincoln Central, serving a sparse population between. Inevitably it succumbed; the last trains ran on 17 September 1955. Extra carriages were provided for the last day service, but few people turned up. The lines eastwards were rationalised over the years and Shirebrook North was subsequently cut off in 1974, but they still serve a remnant of Britain's deep-mined coal industry and have been chosen for Network Rail's High Marnham Test Track which includes a short electrified section.

Former Services

Preceding station	Disused railways	Following station
Scarcliffe; Line and station closed	Great Central Railway; LD&ECR	Warsop; Line and station closed
Creswell and Welbeck; Line and station closed	Great Central Railway; LD&ECR	Shirebrook West; Line closed, station open
Terminus	London and North Eastern Railway; Leen Valley Line	Shirebrook South; Line and station closed

=== Contraction of infrastructure ===
The following complex history of change is most clearly rendered by the superb map in Lawson Little's "Langwith Junction, the life and times of a railway village."

The Beighton Branch heading North from Shirebrook closed in two stages. The first took effect from 9 January 1967 when a wholly new connection was opened from a point on the branch south of Creswell and Welbeck to the ex-MR Nottingham-Worksop branch (now the Robin Hood Line) near the future site of Langwith-Whaley Thorns station. The branch north of that point to the northern portal of Spinkhill Tunnel was closed and lifted. From Beighton Junction southwards to the northern portal of Spinkhill tunnel, a distance of 3 miles, remained open until Westthorpe Colliery, Killamarsh closed in 1984.

This had no direct impact on Shirebrook North as the remaining traffic along the branch still passed through.

The Leen Valley Extension across the embankment through Shirebrook Village then through Shirebrook South closed completely on 27 May 1968. The running lines near Shirebrook North were adopted as sidings of the wagon works.

This left the site of Shirebrook North as an East to North through line with sidings to Davis's Wagon Works.

This came to an end on 11 November 1974 when a wholly new single line connection was blasted between the ex-MR line and the LD&ECR line east of the former. This cutting slopes up to the East-bound former LD&ECR, enabling the removal of "Bridge 37" over the ex-MR line and the closure of the southern remnant of the Sheffield branch (aka the Beighton Branch) which had been performing this function.

Davis's Wagon Works was still a significant railway customer, so the South to West "New Found Out" curve was reinstated to serve the works, which it still does. This curve (which was originally the inside leg of a flyover junction with the Midland facing Mansfield) has an interesting syphon which appears to have been preceded by a launder going over.

Since that date the site of Shirebrook North has been a headshunt for the wagon works.

The station footbridge, which had been replaced in 1960, was finally demolished in Spring 1986 and loaded on a train which ran down the New Found Out then reversed towards Worksop, taking the ex-MR "Clowne Branch" at Elmton & Creswell.

== Other services ==
September 1955 left Shirebrook North providing three services and witnessing two others.

1. Goods were handled up to 4 January 1965.

2. Excursions called until 5 September 1964, notably to East Coast resorts and to football matches.

3. Timetabled Summer weekend services also survived or passed until 5 September 1964:

- NW via Clowne South to Blackpool
- NE via the Tuxford West to North curve and Retford to the Yorkshire Coast
- East via Lincoln to the Lincolnshire Coast and to Yarmouth Vauxhall and
- SSE to Nottingham Victoria to connect with holiday expresses to many points South and West.

The Yorkshire coast service provided a minor "last", in that the final, timetabled, steam-hauled train south from Retford was not an "A3" for Kings Cross, but was hauled by Black 5 45444 via Tuxford, the LD&EC and Mansfield Central, with a connection from Ollerton calling at Shirebrook North.

4. The route from Lincoln through Shirebrook North and Clowne South served as a diversionary route. Notably, this led to the occasional appearance of March "Britannia" 4-6-2s on the Liverpool Central-Harwich Parkeston Quay Boat Train (known locally as "The Boaty") trundling through Warsop and Shirebrook North in the early 1960s.

5. GC main line trains were also sometimes diverted or routed via Shirebrook North, travelling from Nottingham Victoria via the Leen Valley, through Shirebrook South, Shirebrook North and Clowne South, regaining the GC Main Line at Killamarsh. From 1962 to 1964 a sleeping car service from Marylebone to Glasgow was routed through Clowne South.

Passenger traffic was very small compared with the massive mineral traffic, in which coal the heaviest.

== Modern times ==
The Shirebrook railway station used today is on the Robin Hood Line, which is the modern branding of the Midland Railway's Nottingham to Worksop route. It closed in 1964 as Shirebrook West (despite being on the eastern edge of the town) and reopened in 1998 as simply "Shirebrook". The site of Shirebrook North is being redeveloped for housing although some track does remain in situ near the main Robin Hood Line.
