= Horns Bridge =

LD&ECR Viaduct
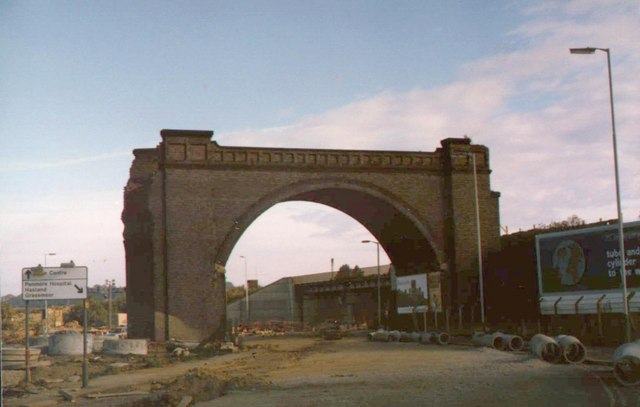
- Remaining arch of viaduct over the A61 road in 1984.
- Coordinates: 53°13′51.1″N 1°25′17.5″W
- Carries: Ex-Lancashire, Derbyshire and East Coast Railway
- Crosses: Chesterfield Loop, Midland Main Line, A61 road, A617 road, River Rother, River Hipper
- Locale: Chesterfield, Derbyshire

Characteristics
- Design: 7 brick arches, 4 lattice deck girders and a bowstring bridge
- Total length: 700 feet (210 m)
- Width: Twin Standard Gauge Rail
- Height: 63 feet (19 m)

History
- Opened: February 1897
- Closed: March 1957

Location
- Interactive map of LD&ECR Viaduct

Horns Bridge is a small area on the southeastern edge of Chesterfield, Derbyshire, England which was remarkable at one time for its congested intersection of roads, rivers, footpaths and railways.

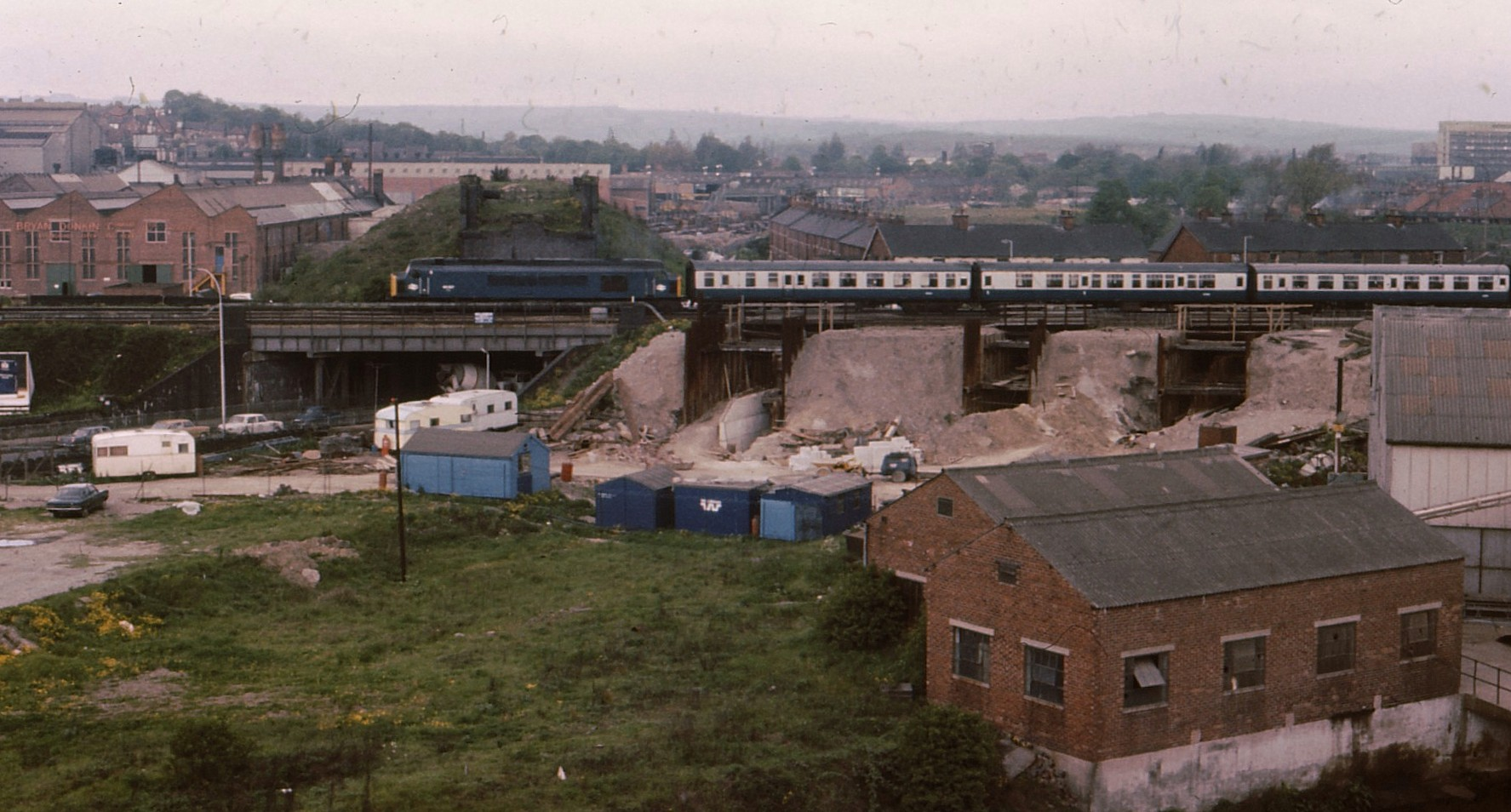
Horns Bridge looking west, April 1972

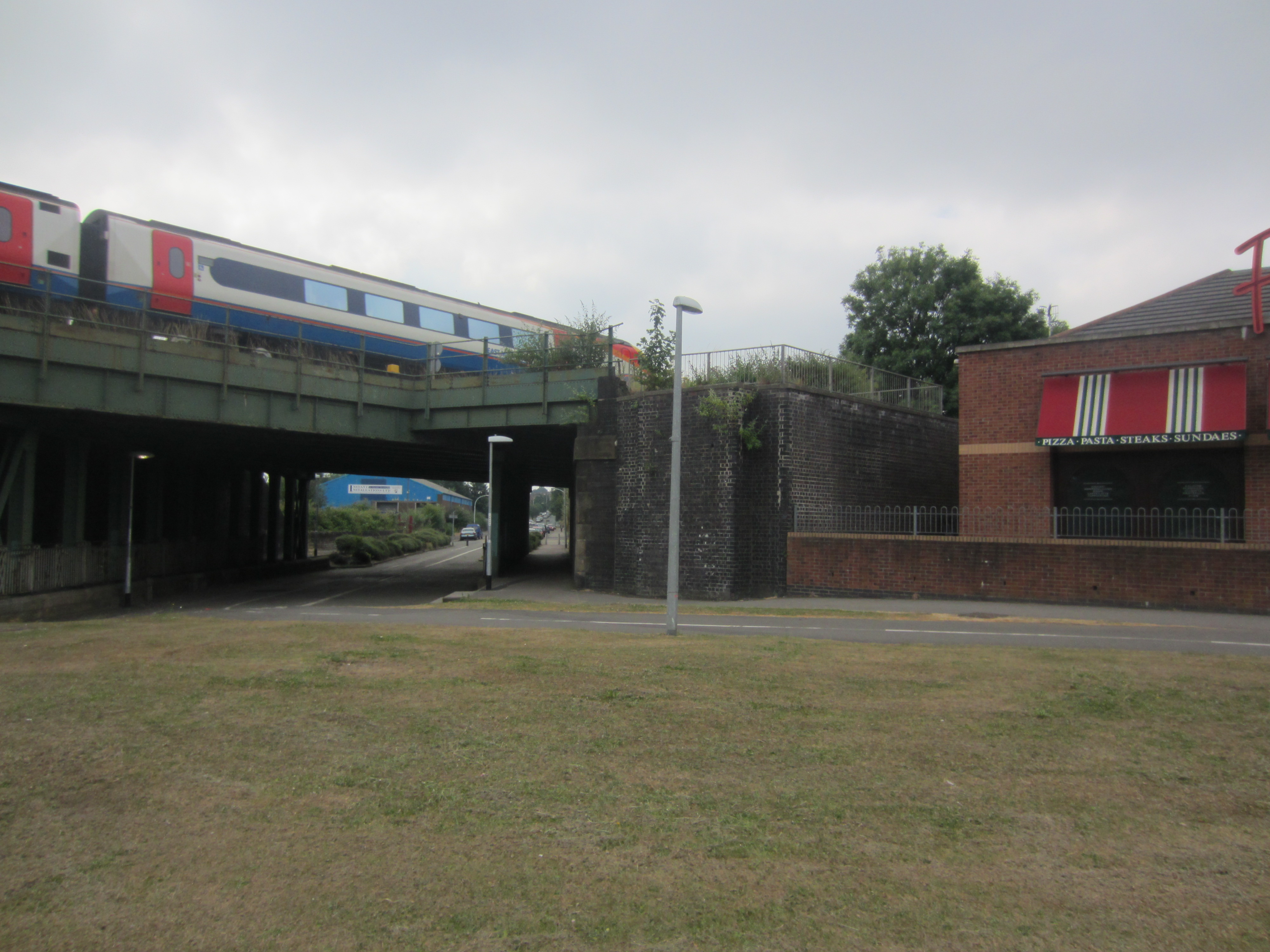
Horns Bridge and viaduct remnant, July 2013

The congestion in Horns Bridge was three-dimensional. At ground level were the rivers Hipper and Rother, the main road to Derby (now the A61), the main road to Mansfield (now the A617), and the Great Central Railway's "Chesterfield Loop", off which ran "Hyde's Sidings". At middle level were the Midland Railway Main Line and "Brampton Branch", and at high level, passing over a viaduct, was the Lancashire, Derbyshire and East Coast Railway Main Line to Lincoln.

== Ground level ==
At ground level, both rivers are prone to flooding. The Horns Bridge area and the inter-war floods are depicted in "The Changing Face of Chesterfield."

From Chesterfield town centre the Derby and Mansfield roads separate at Horns Bridge. Nowadays this happens at a large roundabout with several exits. In essence, the A617 Mansfield Road has been upgraded to a dual carriageway running South East to Junction 29 of the M1, incorporating in the process much of the trackbed of the GCR's "Chesterfield Loop." South of Horns Bridge the A61 Derby Road is less changed, it is still a traditional two lane road. North of Horns Bridge, however, it has been dualled and re-routed to follow the alignment of the GCR Chesterfield Loop through the town, although bypassing the former GCR tunnel. The southern entrance to this tunnel can still be seen through the fence at the junction of Hollis Lane and Dixon's Road.

Travelling southwards from Sheffield Victoria, the GCR's double-track Chesterfield Loop branched West off the GCR's Main Line at Staveley and rejoined it at Heath. Its station in Chesterfield was Chesterfield Central, situated North of the Town Centre. The station closed on 5 March 1963. Tracks South of the station to Grassmoor and Heath were lifted in the Winter of 1963/4.

South from Chesterfield Central the line went immediately into Chesterfield Tunnel, from which it emerged a few hundred yards North of Horns Bridge. It then ran under the Brampton Branch, under a footbridge, under the Midland line, under another footbridge, under the LD&ECR line, over its junction with Hyde's Sidings and finally into open country. This plethora of activity was crammed into a few hundred yards at Horns Bridge.

The first footpath referred to above ran West to East from the main road. It immediately crossed the Loop Line to the West of the Midland Line using a footbridge known locally as "40 Steps." It then went under the Midland Line. The other footpath ran South to North to the East of the Midland line and crossed the Loop line between the Midland Line and Hyde's sidings. Both footbridges were popular locations for trainspotting and photography, and were used for scenes for sketches and paintings by Chesterfield artist David Charlesworth.

Hyde's Sidings were laid by the GCR off the Loop and served factories to the East of the Midland line at the bottom of Hady Hill. The exit from the sidings onto the loop was protected by a gate, which was a source of mystery to lay observers.

== Middle level ==
At the middle level was the first railway into Chesterfield, the MR's main line from Sheffield Midland to London St Pancras, now widely known as the Midland Main Line. Chesterfield Midland was (and still is) North of the town centre, to the East of Chesterfield Central. Its four tracks crossed the Mansfield Road (Hasland Road) over Horns Bridge immediately East of the junction with Derby Road. The same general layout exists today, though the road junction is now a large roundabout. The western pair of tracks were used by all passenger trains and some goods trains. The eastern pair were only used by goods trains. Nowadays some passenger services also use the eastern tracks, so healthy is the level of passenger traffic on the line, which has been chosen for electrification in the next few years.

The MR's Brampton Branch turned West off the main line between the Midland station and Horns Bridge. It was single track and never a passenger railway. It was normally worked by an LMS "Jinty" tank. A surviving curiosity of this line is a pair of "bridges to nowhere" built to serve the Brampton Branch when the roads and buildings in the Horns Bridge area underwent major reconstruction in the 1980s. When the factories of Bryan Donkin and Chesterfield Cylinders were moved out of town and the land redeveloped to housing and retail in the early 21st century, the remaining tracks were lifted and the branch now forms the main part of the Hipper Valley Trail of the Chesterfield cycle network between Chesterfield railway station and Walton Dam. As part of this work the original bridge across Lordsmill Street between the two modern "bridges to nowhere" was replaced.

== High level ==
At Horns Bridge's highest level was the main line of the Lancashire, Derbyshire and East Coast Railway (LD&ECR), which spanned across all the features below on a major viaduct. This structure consisted of seven brick arches and four girder spans, 63 feet high, flanked by substantial embankments in both directions. The line ran from Chesterfield Market Place to Lincoln Central. Horns Bridge was reputed to be one of only two places in the world where three railways crossed at one location at three levels, the other being in the USA. Passenger services from Market Place station ended on 3 December 1951, with total closure coming in March 1957. Tracks were lifted but the embankment and viaduct remained intact until 1960, when the metal girder spans were removed. The brick uprights and arches remained in place like Megaliths until 1985, when they and the embankment to the West were removed during the road alteration works.

== Today ==
The Horns Bridge that replaced the original (1840) brick arch in 1932 still carries the mainline over Hasland Road. The road is, however, closed to traffic, that having diverted onto the Hasland Bypass (A617) before reaching the roundabout. Today the only indication that the LD&ECR's massive engineering, land occupancy and buildings ever existed West of Horns Bridge is some blue brickwork beside this bridge. To the East of Horns Bridge the remnants of an embankment and cutting at Spital give some idea of the scale and cost of that undertaking. There is no trace of the GCR's Chesterfield Loop either, though the year stone from the construction of the tunnel has been restored at the Chesterfield Canal.

Following the trend to adorn busy roundabouts, the Horns Bridge traffic island now displays a sculpture entitled 'Growth' by local designer Melanie Jackson. The design celebrates Chesterfield's industrial heritage, whilst also looking forward to the town's future growth and development. A large Weathering Steel 'wheel' or 'cog' appears to grow out of the landscape, symbolising industry, while the spokes twist upwards at the centre to form an opening flower, representing the town's growth and future. The sculpture is approximately 8 metres tall and 8 metres wide. The sculpture was manufactured by Chris Brammall Ltd.

== Bibliography ==
- Anderson, Paul (June 2013). Hawkins, Chris (ed.). "Out and About with Anderson". Railway Bylines. 18 (7). Clophill, Beds: Irwell Press Ltd. ISSN 1360-2098.
- Booth, Chris (2013). The Lancashire, Derbyshire and East Coast Railway A pictorial view of the "Dukeries Route" and branches. Blurb. 06715029.
- Clemens, Jim (2002) [1960-66]. Great Central Remembered. Uffington, Shrewsbury: B&R Video Productions. DVD, Vol 87.
- Cowlishaw, John (2006). British Railways in and Around the Midlands 1953-57. Nottingham: Book Law Publications. ISBN 1-901945-47-2.
- Cupit, J.; Taylor, W. (1984) [1966]. The Lancashire, Derbyshire & East Coast Railway. Oakwood Library of Railway History (2nd ed.). Headington: Oakwood Press. ISBN 0-85361-302-8. OL19.
- DVD (2005). The Lancashire, Derbyshire and East Coast Railway - Memories of a Lost Route. Chesterfield: Terminus Publications. DVD, stills with commentary, 60 mins.
- Gilks, David (April 2002). Blakemore, Michael (ed.). "Mr. Arkwright's Railway". Back Track. 16 (4). Penryn: Atlantic Publishers.
- Kaye, A.R. (1985). The Changing Face of Chesterfield, a Pictorial Then and Now Album. Chesterfield: Lowlander Publications. 271 of 1500.
- Kaye, A.R. (1986). The Changing Face of Chesterfield, a Pictorial Then and Now Album, Volume 2. Chesterfield: Lowlander Publications.
- Kaye, A.R. (1988). North Midland and Peak District Railways in the Steam Age, Volume 2. Chesterfield: Lowlander Publications. ISBN 0-946930-09-0.
- Kaye, A.R. (1991). Great Central Railway North of Nottingham, Volume 2. Chesterfield: Terminus Publications. ISBN 0-946930-12-0.
- Marsden, Michael (2004a) [1962-66]. Sheffield to Nottingham. Birkenshaw, Bradford: Marsden Rail. DVD, Vol 10.
- Marsden, Michael (2004b) [1959-66]. East Midlands Steam. Birkenshaw, Bradford: Marsden Rail. DVD, Vol 26.
- Pixton, Bob (2000). North Midland Portrait of a Famous Route Part One - Derby to Chesterfield. Cheltenham, Gloucestershire: Runpast Publishing. ISBN 1-870754-47-6.
- Walker, Colin P. (1985) [1973]. Main Line Lament, The Final Years of the Great Central Route to London. Llangollen: Pendyke Publications. ISBN 0-904318-11-7.
- Walker, Colin P. (1995). London Midland Steam Twilight, Midland Lines and the Somerset & Dorset, Part 1. Llangollen: Pendyke Publications. ISBN 0-904318-16-8.
- Waller, Peter (2004). Working Steam LNER 2-6-0s. Shepperton: Ian Allan Publishing. ISBN 0-7110-3061-8.
