= LD&ECR Class B =

Class of 4 British 0-6-0T locomotives

LD&ECR Class B LNER Class J60
Type and origin
- Power type: Steam
- Designer: Kitson & Co.
- Builder: Kitson & Co.
- Serial number: 3654–3657
- Build date: 1897
- Total produced: 4
Specifications
- Configuration
  - Whyte: 0-6-0T
  - UIC: C n2t
- Gauge: 4 ft 8 1/2 in (1,435 mm)
- Driver dia.: 4 ft 6 in (1.372 m)
- Wheelbase: 14 ft 0 in (4.27 m)
- Length: 30 ft 6.75 in (9.315 m)
- Loco weight: 46 long tons 16 cwt (104,800 lb or 47.6 t)
- Fuel type: Coal
- Fuel capacity: 2 long tons 0 cwt (4,500 lb or 2 t)
- Water cap.: 1,100 imp gal (5,000 L; 1,300 US gal)
- Boiler pressure: 160 psi (1.10 MPa)
- Heating surface: 961 sq ft (89.3 m^{2})
- Cylinders: Two, inside
- Cylinder size: 17 in × 24 in (432 mm × 610 mm)
Performance figures
- Tractive effort: 17,468 lbf (77.70 kN)
Career
- Operators: Lancashire, Derbyshire and East Coast Railway; → Great Central Railway; → London and North Eastern Railway
- Class: LD&ECR: B; LNER: J60
- Numbers: LD&ECR: 9-12; GCR: 1175–1178 (1153B–1156B from 1910); LNER: 6411–6408 (8366–8369 from 1946)
- Withdrawn: 1947–48
- Disposition: All scrapped

The LD&ECR Class B (LNER Class J60) was a class of 0-6-0T steam locomotives of the Lancashire, Derbyshire and East Coast Railway.

Four examples were built in 1897. Three were normally based at Langwith Junction, while the other was at Tuxford. In later years they moved to Wrexham, with one transferring to Gorton as the works shunter.

Table of locomotives
LD&CR number	Kitson serial number	GCR 1907 number	GCR 1910 number	LNER 1923 number	LNER 1946 number	Date Withdrawn
9	3654	1175	1153B	6411	8366	Mar 1948
10	3655	1176	1154B	6410	8367	Sep 1947
11	3655	1177	1155B	6409	8368	Aug 1948
12	3656	1178	1156B	6408	8369	Feb 1947
