= Bolsover Tunnel =

Railway tunnel in Derbyshire, England

Bolsover Tunnel is a disused and infilled twin-track railway tunnel between Carr Vale and Scarcliffe in Derbyshire, England.

At 2,624 yards (1 1/2 mi; 2.4 km) it was the 18th longest railway tunnel in Britain prior to its closure in 1951.

== History ==
The tunnel was opened by the Lancashire, Derbyshire and East Coast Railway (later part of the Great Central Railway and subsequently the LNER) in March 1897. As originally planned, this was a highly ambitious scheme, as its name suggests, but only the central section between Chesterfield Market Place and Lincoln, together with a branch from Langwith Junction to the outskirts of Sheffield, were ever built.

The tunnel hit problems during construction which were never satisfactorily resolved throughout its life. Chief among these was heavy water ingress. This was tapped to supply the nearby town of Bolsover and at 200,000 imperial gallons (910,000 L) per day was sufficient to supply its needs. The water problem was exacerbated by mining subsidence. Traffic, notably coal, east of Langwith Junction was heavy, but little materialised on the Chesterfield to Langwith section. These three factors, plus an estimated cost of £1 million (in 1951) and uncosted concerns over the nearby Doe Lea Viaduct made the decision to close the tunnel easy. In its later years so much propping was needed and so much distortion of parts of the walls occurred that the line was singled from Scarcliffe to Bolsover South.

The section between Chesterfield and Langwith Junction (by then renamed Shirebrook North), was closed to passenger traffic by British Railways in December 1951. Bolsover South and Scarcliffe stations were closed completely. The section from Chesterfield Market Place through Arkwright Town and onto the GC main line remained open to goods traffic until March 1957.

Track lifting through the tunnel commenced immediately and was completed within weeks, at which point it was bricked up at both ends.

During 1966 a major operation began to fill in the tunnel and landscape the entrance at the Carr Vale end.

Today the approach cutting at the Chesterfield end has been infilled leaving only the top of the portal visible, sealed with a thick concrete plug. The Scarcliffe portal survives at the end of an inhospitable 600-yard (549 m) approach cutting which is densely overgrown and often heavily flooded, steep rock sides making access to the cutting impossible.

The tunnel itself remains infilled with colliery spoil, local legend rumouring the presence in the tunnel of toxic dioxin substances from the nearby Coalite plant, though there is no official source for this. Ownership was transferred to the National Coal Board around the time of infilling, with British Rail remaining liable for two air shafts, an arrangement which remains to this day. A third shaft is believed to be “hidden” near the east end.

The two air shafts also survive, both capped with concrete, one in view above ground the other invisible but extant. The tunnel's infill has settled over time to leave a void which in a few places reaches almost to the full height of the tunnel, whilst a serious collapse blocks the tunnel about 400 yards (366 m) inwards from the east portal. The collapse has been speculated as being associated with the hidden third shaft, however it is believed the collapse is further from the east portal than where the shaft is suspected to be sited.

The tunnel continues to suffer from water ingress, and apart from the air shafts remains unmaintained and uninspected, despite passing beneath public land including housing. The lining is distorted in places, and there are known to be issues with CO_{2} levels in parts of the tunnel. Apart from the continued inspection of the two air shafts by the DfT, there appears to be no long-term future strategy for the tunnel, despite the liability posed.

== Relics ==
Two sites give modern-day observers a taste of the tunnel: "Blue Banks" and Scarcliffe Cutting. Blue Banks 53°12′59.7″N 1°16′21.56″W is a spoil tip on the cross-country footpath between Hillstown and Scarcliffe dating from the construction of the line in the 1890s. The tipped material is so inert that over a hundred years later vegetation remains sparse. Scarcliffe Cutting is best viewed by walking along the public footpath which continues over the stone stile at the end of the short "Wood Lane" which starts by the restored signpost opposite the Elm Tree public house in Scarcliffe. About 300 yards (274 m) after the stile the path crosses a bridge 53°12′39.11″N 1°15′24.01″W over the cutting, which Network Rail probably have to maintain, even though the tracks were lifted over 60 years ago.

Bolsover Tunnel has one claim to fame, at least locally. During WW2 the Royal Train was stabled in the tunnel for one night. Locals told of going unsuspectingly for walks and being astonished to be stopped by armed soldiers. The story was confirmed as true by the late Trevor Skirrey, one-time signalman at Scarcliffe.
