= Chesterfield Market Place railway station =

Former railway station in Derbyshire, England

Chesterfield Market Place
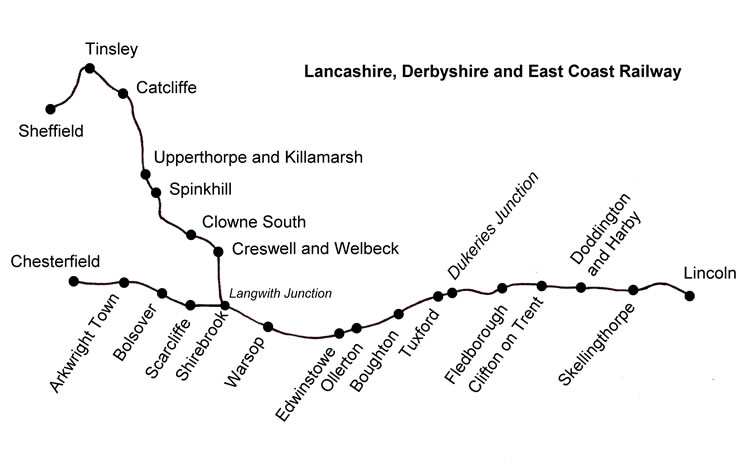
- The Lancashire, Derbyshire & East Coast and Sheffield District Railways

General information
- Location: Chesterfield, Borough of Chesterfield, England
- Coordinates: 53.2351°N 1.4319°W
- Grid reference: SK379710
- Platforms: 4

Other information
- Status: Disused

History
- Original company: Lancashire, Derbyshire and East Coast Railway
- Pre-grouping: Great Central Railway
- Post-grouping: London and North Eastern Railway, British Railways

Key dates
- 8 March 1897: Opened as Chesterfield
- 1 January 1907: Renamed Chesterfield Market Place
- 3 December 1951: Closed to passengers
- 4 March 1957: Closed completely
Location

Chesterfield Market Place was a former railway station in the centre of the town of Chesterfield, in Derbyshire, England. It was the third and final station to be built in the town; services from the first two, Chesterfield Midland (which remains open today as Chesterfield) and Chesterfield Central (which closed in 1963) ran north–south, but those from Market Place ran to the east.

== History ==
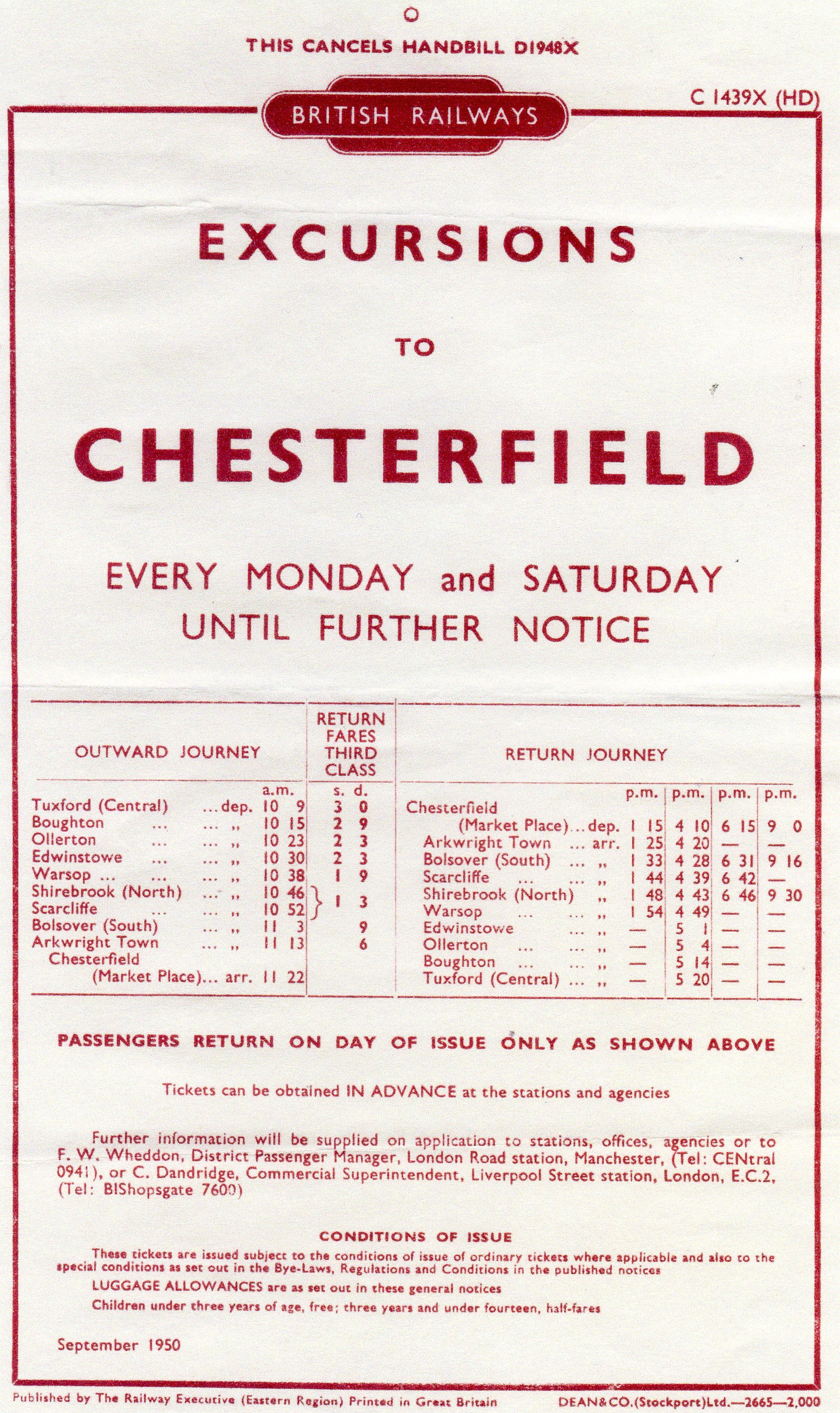
1950 Excursion Advert

=== Opening ===
The station was opened as Chesterfield by the LD&ECR on 8 March 1897 and was the headquarters of the line. It was renamed Chesterfield Market Place on 1 January 1907.

The station was closed to passengers by British Railways on 3 December 1951 because of the prohibitive cost of maintaining and repairing Bolsover Tunnel, together with concerns over Doe Lea Viaduct and the limited amount of traffic. Goods services continued until 4 March 1957.

Market Place station was situated on West Bars, adjacent to two old inns; the White Horse and the Bird in Hand. To take advantage of the additional custom generated by the railway, the owners of the White Horse, William Stones brewery of Sheffield, applied to build a new hotel. This was approved by the licensing magistrates in April 1898.

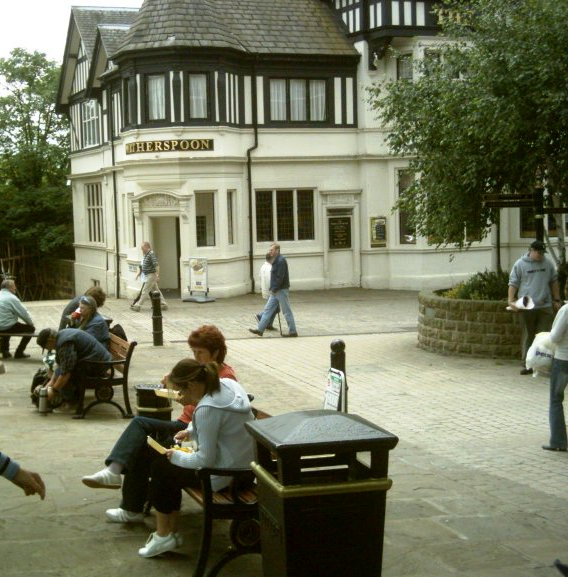
The hotel, named after the Duke of Portland

As the licensing laws of the time prevented a pub from closing down during rebuilding, the new hotel was built in two parts. Building of the first phase commenced on the site of the Bird in Hand which had closed and had recently been demolished, its licence being transferred to the refreshment rooms in Market Place station. When the first part was complete the licence was transferred from the White Horse, along with the landlord, Job Siddall. The second phase was then erected on the site of the White Horse. The hotel, named after the Duke of Portland, on whose estate much of the railway ran, was officially opened Christmas 1899 by the Earl of Rosebery Archibald Primrose.

=== Layout ===
The station was a substantial three-storey structure, with a long glass awning; it was quite unlike any other station on the line.

Inside the station, a glass-roofed concourse led to four curved platforms on two islands: 1 & 2, 4 & 5. In the centre, in place of the missing platform 3, was a release line for the locomotives. The adjacent goods depot was, at the time, the largest covered area in the town.

Leaving the station, the line passed the Saxby and Farmer 80 lever station signal box, crossed Park Road by an arched brick bridge then travelled along a short length of embankment followed by Boythorpe Viaduct which crossed the Midland Railway's Brampton Branch and the industrial Boythorpe Railway, then a longer stretch of embankment leading to a major viaduct at Horns Bridge, which passed over what is now the Midland Main Line, main roads to Mansfield and Derby, the Great Central Railway, Hyde's Sidings, and the river Rother. It consisted of seven brick arches and four girder spans, 63 feet (19 m) high. From there, the line climbed at 1 in 100 (10 ‰) as far as the first summit at Duckmanton Tunnel, followed shortly by the station at Arkwright Town.

=== Operations ===
Until 1927, the station was also served by Chesterfield Tramway which ran from Brampton to Whittington. A dead end spur was built near the station and was situated on Market Place. At least one published photograph of the station shows the tramlines and overhead wires.

=== Services ===
In 1922, there were seven departures on Mondays to Fridays, with four extra on Saturdays; it never had a Sunday service.

The weekday seven consisted of:

- Two all-stations to Lincoln High St, taking 90 minutes
- Three all-stations to Mansfield Central, taking 45 minutes
- One all-stations to Bolsover South, taking twelve minutes.

The Saturday extras consisted of one to Bolsover, one to Langwith Junction and two to Mansfield Central.

A notable feature was the care taken to timetable services along the Beighton Branch to connect with Chesterfield services at Langwith Junction. At 10:44, for example, four trains would be standing at Langwith Junction:

- 10:46 to Chesterfield Market Place (from Lincoln)
- 10:46 to Lincoln (from Chesterfield)
- 10:50 to Sheffield Midland, via the Beighton Branch
- 10:45 to Mansfield.

Anyone catching the last weekday departure from Chesterfield, the 19:00 to Mansfield Central, could stay in their seat at Langwith Junction and arrive at Mansfield Central at 19:50, or change trains and arrive at Mansfield Town at 19:40.

More journey opportunities were added in 1925, when the service from Nottingham Victoria through Skegby and Pleasley East which, since its inception in 1901, had inexplicably terminated at Shirebrook South, was extended the last mile to Shirebrook North. This was a forlorn gesture, as the service was withdrawn throughout in 1931.

The intersecting services along the Beighton Branch were withdrawn on the outbreak of the Second World War, with Mansfield Central services ending by 1945, leaving Chesterfield Market Place with two all-stations trains to Lincoln plus some shorter workings to Shirebrook North and to Bolsover.

Preceding station	Disused railways	Following station
Terminus	Great Central Railway; Lancashire, Derbyshire and East Coast Railway	Arkwright Town; Line and station closed

=== Closure ===
In August 1948, its unused track and space was put to work to house the Stephenson Centenary Exhibition of locomotives and rolling stock. As a last hurrah, special trains were run to the coast shortly before the station closed to passengers on 3 December 1951.

After closure to passengers, the tracks into the platforms were lifted; the line to Arkwright Town was singled and operated on the "one engine in steam" basis. This was perfectly adequate for the single daily freight train from Staveley, which ended in March 1957.

From some point between 1951 and 1956, the station building became used by Charles Credland Ltd, a paint and wallpaper firm, which continued until demolition.

Tracks were lifted in 1957/8, when the bridge over Park Road was demolished using explosives.

== The site today ==
The station was demolished in April 1973 and, following considerable redevelopment of the area, it has now been built upon. The current building occupying the space is Future Walk, the finance headquarters for Royal Mail. A few signs of the old embankment can still be seen at the bottom of the car park.

== See also ==
- Chesterfield Market
