= Bolsover South railway station =

Former railway station in Derbyshire, England

Bolsover South
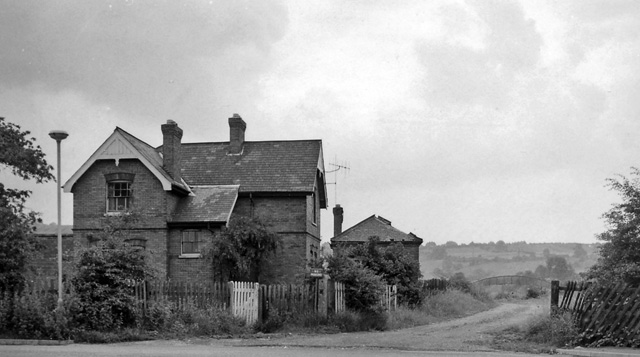
- The station master's house in 1963 (Note: The station itself was behind the bush on the extreme right of the photo. Also behind the photo to the left was a railway-served jam factory.)

General information
- Location: Bolsover, District of Bolsover, England
- Coordinates: 53.2251°N 1.3018°W
- Grid reference: SK 467 700
- Platforms: 2

Other information
- Status: Disused

History
- Original company: LD&ECR
- Pre-grouping: Great Central Railway
- Post-grouping: London and North Eastern Railway; British Railways

Key dates
- 8 March 1897: Opened as Bolsover
- 25 September 1950: Renamed Bolsover South
- 3 December 1951: Closed
Location

Bolsover South is a former railway station in the village of Carr Vale, in Bolsover, Derbyshire, England. It was a stop on the Lancashire, Derbyshire and East Coast Railway between 1897 and 1951.

== History ==
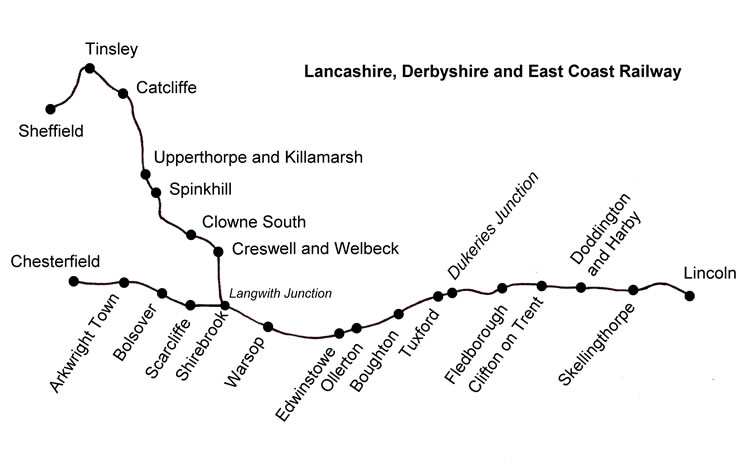
LD&ECR and Sheffield District Railway

The station was opened by the Lancashire, Derbyshire and East Coast Railway (LD&ECR) in March 1897, as Bolsover. It was built in Carr Vale and was one of only two places on the LD&ECR where a level crossing was necessary, the other being Skellingthorpe. To the west was Doe Lea Viaduct and to the east was a 300-foot-high (91 m) limestone ridge, through which it was necessary to drive the notorious Bolsover Tunnel. To the east of this was the next station at Scarcliffe.

The station architecture was in the company's characteristic modular style with much glazing as were, for example, Arkwright Town, Edwinstowe and Ollerton.

Flash floods hit the area on 27 July 1912 and again on 26 August.

It was closed to all traffic by British Railways in December 1951, primarily due to the prohibitive cost of repairing and maintaining Bolsover Tunnel. Track lifting started immediately after closure and was completed within weeks, though the station building survived as an increasingly vandalised eyesore for some years.

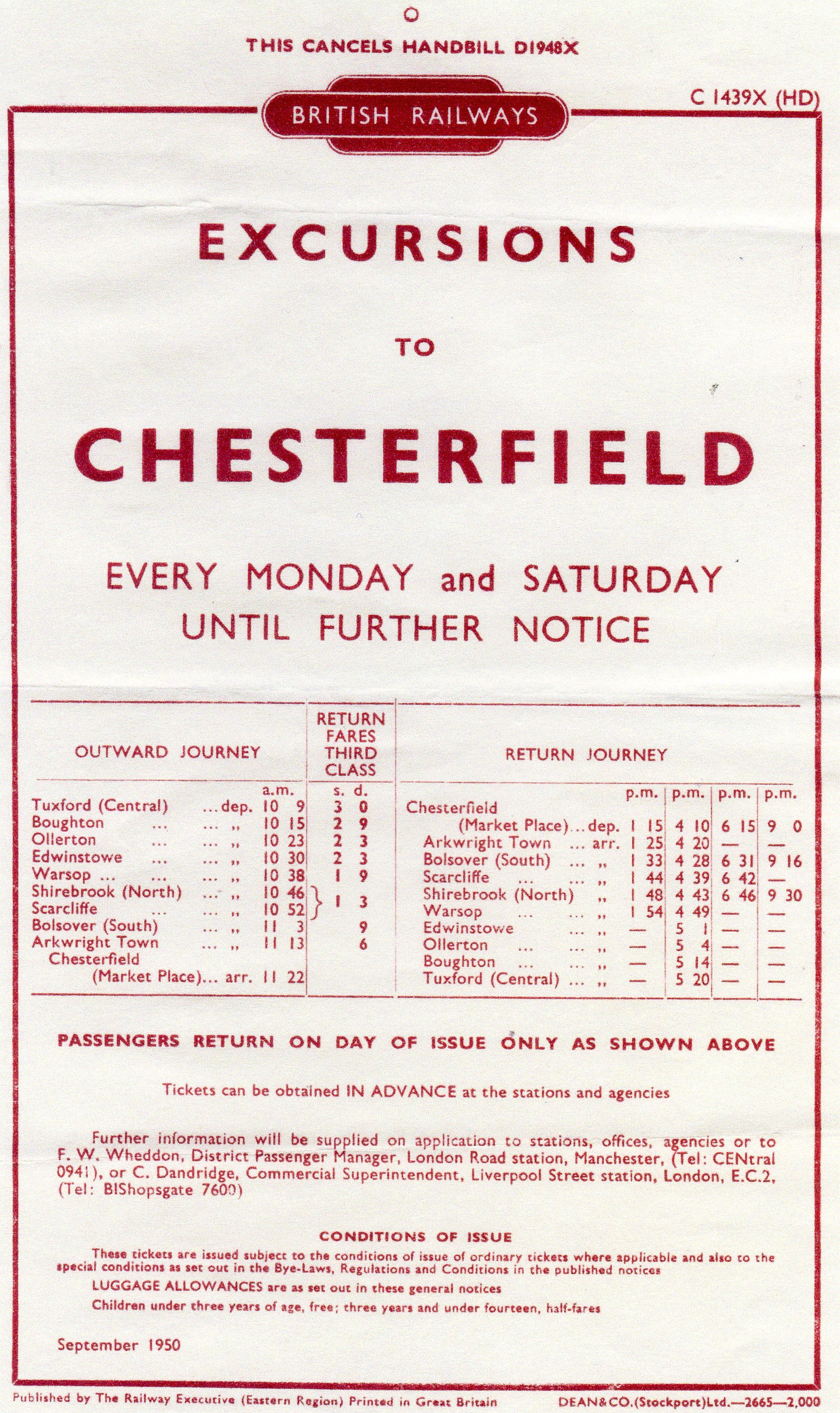
1950 Excursion Advert

Preceding station	Disused railways	Following station
Arkwright Town; Line and station closed	Great Central Railway; Lancashire, Derbyshire and East Coast Railway	Scarcliffe; Line and station closed
