= Doe Lea Viaduct =

- Coordinates: 53°13′37″N 1°18′35″W
- Carries: Ex-Lancashire, Derbyshire and East Coast Railway
- Crosses: Midland Railway's Doe Lea Branch
- Locale: Carr Vale, Derbyshire
- Official name: Bolsover Viaduct

Characteristics
- Design: 8 brick arches
- Total length: 370 feet (110 m)
- Width: Twin Standard Gauge Rail
- Height: 70 feet (21 m)

History
- Opened: February 1897
- Closed: December 1951

Location
- Interactive map of Doe Lea Viaduct

Doe Lea Viaduct is a former railway viaduct near Carr Vale, Bolsover, Derbyshire, England.

== Location ==
The viaduct was originally, formally known as Bolsover Viaduct and is often referred to as Carr Vale Viaduct. It was a substantial, double track structure carrying the LD&ECR's Chesterfield Market Place to Lincoln Central main line over the Midland Railway's Pleasley to Staveley Doe Lea Branch a short distance south of the latter's Bolsover Castle station. The River Doe Lea passed through a culvert under the viaduct's western approach embankment.

The structure was also situated near Bolsover's "Model Village" at the bottom of Bolsover Hill.

== History ==
The viaduct, which consisted of eight brick arches, was opened to goods traffic in February 1897, with passenger traffic following from 8 March.

The section between Chesterfield and Langwith Junction (by then renamed Shirebrook North), was closed to passenger traffic by British Railways in December 1951, due to the unsafe condition of Bolsover Tunnel and concerns over the safety of Doe Lea Viaduct, both of which were affected by colliery subsidence. Bolsover South and Scarcliffe were closed completely. Track lifting from Markham Junction, over the viaduct and on to Shirebrook North commenced immediately.

The viaduct itself was demolished on 24 August 1952 by the army using explosives. This was filmed and the film later used in a commercial war film, becoming a bridge in war torn France.

The viaduct was approached by substantial embankments from both ends. That from the eastern end was removed some years ago, but that from the western, Chesterfield, end is readily accessible as part of the Peter Fidler Reserve and can be walked westwards for about 300 yards (274 m) from the reserve's Point 11.

== Modern access ==
The Doe Lea Branch is now the "Stockley Trail" public bridleway from near Glapwell to near the location of Bolsover Castle Station. Anyone walking from the A632 end to Carr Vale Flash nature reserve or beyond would walk under the viaduct, had it still been in existence.

== Further Material ==
- Dow, George (1985) [1965]. Great Central, Volume Three: Fay Sets the Pace, 1900–1922. Shepperton: Ian Allan. ISBN 978-0-7110-0263-0. OCLC 500447049.
