= Lancashire, Derbyshire and East Coast Railway =

Railway in England

Overview
- Status: Absorbed by Great Central Railway
- Owner: Lancashire, Derbyshire and East Coast Railway Company (1891–1907)
- Locale: Derbyshire, Nottinghamshire, and Lincolnshire, England
- Termini: Chesterfield (Market Place); Pyewipe Junction, Lincoln

Service
- Type: Historical railway company
- Services: Chesterfield to Lincoln main line; Beighton branch (to Sheffield District Railway)
- Depot: Tuxford Locomotive Works
- Rolling stock: Steam locomotives (tank engines)

History
- Opened: November 16, 1896 (goods); December 15, 1896 (passengers)

Technical
- Character: Passenger and heavy colliery freight

The Lancashire, Derbyshire and East Coast Railway (LD&ECR) was built to connect coalfields in Derbyshire and Nottinghamshire with Warrington and a new port on the Lincolnshire coast. It was a huge undertaking, and the company was unable to raise the money to build its line. With the financial help of the Great Eastern Railway it managed to open between Chesterfield and Lincoln with a branch towards Sheffield from 1896. Despite efforts to promote tourist travel, the passenger business was never buoyant, but collieries were connected to the line, at first and in succeeding years. The Great Eastern Railway, and other main line companies, transported coal to the southern counties, and the company's engines took coal to Immingham in great quantities. The company had a fleet of tank engines.

The Sheffield branch was not completed, but interests in Sheffield encouraged its extension which was built by a nominally independent company, the Sheffield District Railway, sponsored by the LD&ECR and the Great Eastern Railway with the support of the Midland Railway. It opened in 1900.

Hopes of reaching the Lincolnshire coast were never fulfilled and the LD&ECR's dependency on other lines limited its future. It agreed a merger with the Great Central Railway and was absorbed by the GCR in 1907. The Nottinghamshire coalfield continued to develop throughout the first half of the twentieth century, and several new connections to the former LD&ECR line were made.

Between 1939 and 1955 the passenger service was successively curtailed and while some collieries became exhausted, most continued to be productive to the final decade of the twentieth century and beyond. Tuxford Rail Innovation & Development Centre and its connecting line are the only remaining parts of the line still in use.

== Conception ==
The LD&ECR system in 1898

In 1882 Francis Arkwright, the proprietor of the Sutton Scarsdale Hall estate, emigrated to New Zealand, leaving the estate in the care of his cousin William Arkwright. William inherited the property in his own right in 1915. Sutton Scarsdale is about four miles east of Chesterfield, and there were rich coal seams beneath the property. There were plans to exploit the mineral deposits, but local transport links were unsatisfactory at the time, and Arkwright realised that he needed better railway connections to his property. Finding the nearby Midland Railway and the Manchester, Sheffield and Lincolnshire Railway unresponsive, he decided that an independent railway was the solution.

Newark and Ollerton Railway Act 1887
- Act of Parliament
- Parliament of the United Kingdom
- Long title: An Act for incorporating the Newark and Ollerton Railway Company and authorising them to make and maintain the Newark and Ollerton Railway and for other purposes.
- Citation: 50 & 51 Vict. c. lxix

Dates
- Royal assent: 5 July 1887

Text of statute as originally enacted

The Newark and Ollerton Railway was authorised by the Newark and Ollerton Railway Act 1887 (50 & 51 Vict. c. lxix); it was to connect mineral-bearing lands near Ollerton with the Great Northern Railway main line. Arkwright suggested to the Great Northern Railway that it should adopt the unbuilt line and extend it to his own estate, but the GNR was not interested. This confirmed Arkwright's view that an independent railway was needed. He saw that the obstruction of the existing railways meant that he would need to connect to a coastal port; his railway could then convey the coal to its own docks for export. Sutton Scarsdale lay in the centre of the country, and Arkwright conceived that a port on both sides, to west as well as to east, was desirable. He enlisted the support of neighbours, the Duke of Portland, the Duke of Newcastle and Earl Manvers, whose position was similar.

An engineer, Robert Elliott-Cooper, was engaged and he investigated what routes such an ambitious railway might adopt. In fact several minor railways had been authorised in the past: in most cases their powers had long since lapsed, but the routes had been surveyed and were therefore presumably practicable. As well as the Newark and Ollerton Railway, there were two currently authorised schemes, the Macclesfield and Warrington Railway and the Lincoln and East Coast Railway. Others which had been discussed were lines from Macclesfield to Buxton and, crossing the Pennines, from Buxton to Sheffield, while a railway from Chesterfield to Buxton had been planned in 1845. Moreover, in 1884 powers had been granted, but not implemented, for the building of docks at Sutton-on-Sea on the Lincolnshire coast. There were iron ore deposits to the east of Lincoln which might encourage the establishment of an iron smelting industry there.

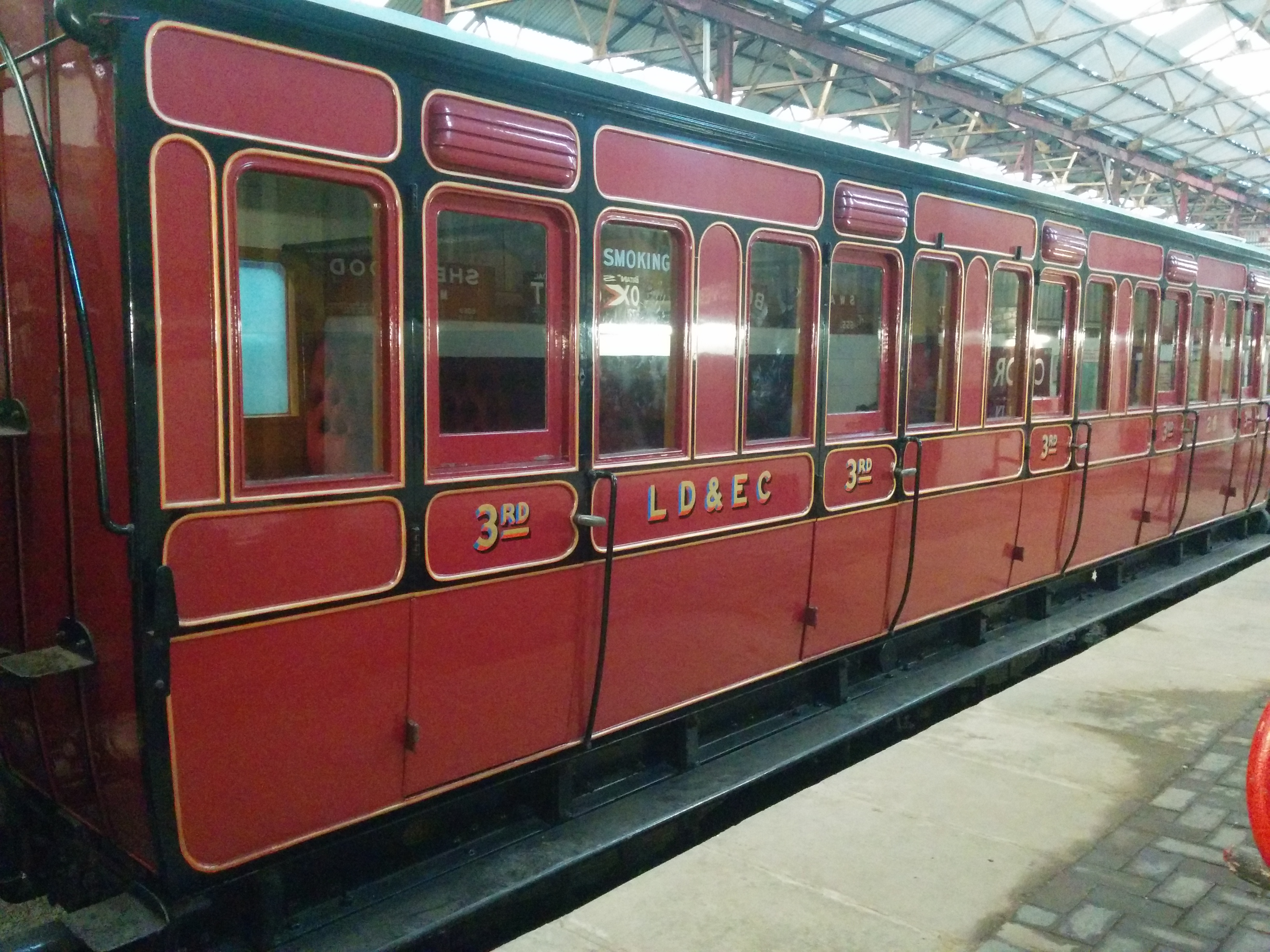
Lancashire, Derbyshire and East Coast Railway carriage, built in 1896

Elliott-Cooper and Emerson Muschamp Bainbridge, an eminent Engineer and the largest lessee of the North Derbyshire coalfield collaborated in the task of formulating a practicable scheme for the line. They planned a route adopting the course of ten formerly proposed railways for the main line, as well as 17 shorter branches connecting collieries and nearby routes, and the line was fully surveyed by November 1890. The plans were published and the scheme submitted for the 1891 session of Parliament. It was to be named the Lancashire, Derbyshire and East Coast Railway, often referred to then as the East to West Railway. The capital of the company was fixed at £5,000,000, in £10 shares, and the promoters declared their belief that a dividend of 11 per cent might be expected. In spite of the difficult nature of the country through which the central section of the railway would pass, the cost of the construction was estimated at not more than £42,857 per mile, a sum considerably less than that incurred by most other cross-country railways.

== The parliamentary bill, and authorisation ==
Lancashire, Derbyshire and East Coast Railway Act 1891
- Act of Parliament
- Parliament of the United Kingdom
- Long title: An Act for making and maintaining Railways in the Counties of Chester Lancaster Derby Nottingham and Lincoln to be called the Lancashire Derbyshire and East Coast Railway and for other purposes.
- Citation: 54 & 55 Vict. c. clxxxix

Dates
- Royal assent: 5 August 1891

Text of statute as originally enacted

The Manchester, Sheffield and Lincolnshire Railway opposed the bill in Parliament, seeing that much of its route paralleled its own lines; the Midland Railway too opposed it, chiefly due to proposed running powers in the Manchester area. Conversely the Great Eastern Railway supported it; the GER had access to Lincoln over the Great Northern and Great Eastern Joint Railway, and saw that the new route would give it better access to collieries. During the parliamentary stages the GER indicated that it would give financial support to the line in exchange for running powers over the entire system. The Lancashire, Derbyshire and East Coast Railway Act 1891 (54 & 55 Vict. c. clxxxix) was passed on 5 August. It was the largest railway scheme ever approved by Parliament in a single session; the main line from Warrington to Sutton-on-Sea amounted to 170 miles of railway with branches, as well as extensive dock installations. The estimated cost of the construction alone was £4,542,522. The docks at Sutton-on-Sea would cost £700,000.

== Raising finance for construction ==
The authorised capital of the new company was £5 million, but it was immediately obvious that subscriptions for such a large sum would not easily be found. In November 1891 the GER examined the plans for the scheme and agreed to subscribe £250,000. In the circumstances, the GER became the dominant force in the company, and it insisted on the first construction being limited to the main line between Chesterfield and Lincoln, with a branch to Beighton, which it was hoped would give access to Sheffield by running powers over the MS&LR. (In fact Parliament authorised the Beighton line but refused the running powers.) The first sod was cut by Mrs Arkwright at Chesterfield on 7 June 1892. In a speech she looked forward to travelling throughout on the line in three years' time, in 1895.

Construction was started, but subscription for shares was extremely slow. In February 1894 the company asked the main contractor to accept shares instead of cash; he refused, and stated that he would stop work if not paid in cash promptly. At the beginning of May 1894 public subscriptions amounted to about £400,000. The LD&ECR directors and their friends had made themselves responsible for a further £850,000, and a new director (Robert William Perks) and his associates, were to put up £250,000. After protracted negotiations the Great Eastern Railway confirmed their earlier offer to subscribe a quarter of a million. The condition was the separation of the central section from the eastern section and their constitution as separate concerns; the GER was not prepared to see their money expended on the line to Sutton-on-Sea.

Lancashire, Derbyshire and East Coast Railway Act 1895
- Act of Parliament
- Parliament of the United Kingdom
- Long title: An Act to confer further Powers on the Lancashire Derbyshire and East Coast Railway Company for the Construction of Works and Acquisition of Lands and for the Abandonment of some of their authorised Railways and for other purposes.
- Citation: 58 & 59 Vict. c. cxli

Dates
- Royal assent: 6 July 1895

Text of statute as originally enacted

The LD&ECR accepted this condition on 3 May 1894. A separate company called the Lincoln and East Coast Railway and Dock Company was eventually incorporated by the Lincoln and East Coast Railway and Dock Act 1897 (60 & 61 Vict. c. ccxxxiv) on 6 August 1897: it adopted the powers of the LD&ECR to build east of Lincoln, and with them the still unfulfilled North Sea Fisheries (East Lincolnshire) Harbour & Dock Company. The Lincoln and East Coast Railway and Dock was destined never to materialise. The LD&ECR authorised lines west of Chesterfield were abandoned by the Lancashire, Derbyshire and East Coast Railway Act 1895 (58 & 59 Vict. c. cxli) of 6 July 1895.

== First openings ==
On 15 May 1895 Harry Willmott was appointed as General Manager. He proved an energetic and able force in carrying the affairs of the new company forward.

The first section of the line was opened for goods traffic from Barlborough Colliery on the Beighton line, via Langwith to Pyewipe Junction, near Lincoln on the GN and GE Joint Line, on 16 November 1896. Barlborough, immediately west of Clowne, was for the time being the northern extremity of the authorised Beighton branch, because of the colliery there. A junction with the Midland Railway at Clowne, and branches to Creswell, Langwith and Warsop Main collieries, as well as the north curve to the Great Northern at Tuxford were brought into use on the same date.

Difficulties in the construction of Bolsover Tunnel delayed opening of the Chesterfield main line, but passenger traffic was started on the line from Edwinstowe to Lincoln GNR station on 15 December 1896. There were intermediate stations at Ollerton, Tuxford, Fledborough, Clifton-on-Trent, and Skellingthorpe. The GER were quick to make use of their running powers, soon conveying coal from the line. On 8 February 1897 the line was opened from Chesterfield to Langwith to goods and mineral traffic, followed by passenger opening on 8 March 1897. Further stations at Doddington & Harby, Boughton and Dukeries Junction were added during 1897. Dukeries Junction was originally to be called Tuxford Junction; it was situated at the point where the LD&ECR passed over the GNR main line and platforms serving the two railways were connected by stairs. Intermediate stations were provided at Bolsover and Arkwright Town (originally to be named Duckmanton) between Langwith Junction and Chesterfield, and at Warsop between Langwith Junction and Edwinstowe. There were no stations between Langwith Junction and Clowne until the opening of Creswell & Welbeck on 1 June 1897. Scarcliffe, between Langwith Junction and Bolsover, first appeared in Bradshaw in January 1898.

The passenger service on the main line was six trains a day from Chesterfield to Langwith Junction, and three from there to Lincoln.

== Business development ==
Lancashire, Derbyshire and East Coast Railway Act 1892
- Act of Parliament
- Parliament of the United Kingdom
- Long title: An Act to authorise the Lancashire Derbyshire and East Coast Railway Company to construct Branch Railways and other works to acquire the Undertaking of the North Sea Fisheries (East Lincolnshire) Harbour and Dock Company and for other purposes.
- Citation: 55 & 56 Vict. c. clvi

Dates
- Royal assent: 27 June 1892

The company saw that operating as a feeder of coal to the GER, as agreed with that company, meant that its future independence was uncertain. Strenuous and effective steps were taken by Willmot to develop tourism; the line was designated the Dukeries Route for the purpose. Nevertheless, the attraction of an independent outlet to the sea enabling a heavy mineral traffic was still prominent. It was plain now that the westward route, crossing the Pennines, was out of the question, but Sutton-on-Sea still beckoned to the east. A proposal was formulated by which a subsidiary of the LD&ECR would build the line and the docks. Other interests were active in planning a harbour at Sutton-on-Sea; although a branch line (the Sutton and Willoughby Railway, branching from the Great Northern Railway) was built, opening in 1886, the docks were not. In 1892 powers in the Lancashire, Derbyshire and East Coast Railway Act 1892 (55 & 56 Vict. c. clvi) obtained to build the docks were acquired by the LD&ECR, and in 1897 the Lincoln and East Coast Railway and Dock Company was formed to acquire the powers for the docks and the connecting line from Lincoln. The capital was to be £2 million, but no progress was made and it was abandoned in 1902.

Lancashire, Derbyshire and East Coast Railway Act 1900
- Act of Parliament
- Parliament of the United Kingdom
- Long title: An Act to confer further powers on the Lancashire Derbyshire and East Coast Railway Company.
- Citation: 63 & 64 Vict. c. cxlii

Dates
- Royal assent: 30 July 1900

Text of statute as originally enacted

The Newark and Ollerton Railway had been authorised, but never built. It would have given the Great Northern Railway access to Manchester, if the western part of the LD&ECR had been built, but that was now unlikely. After several extensions of time granted by Parliament it was formally abandoned under the Lancashire, Derbyshire and East Coast Railway Act 1900 (63 & 64 Vict. c. cxlii).

== Langwith Junction ==
Langwith Junction was the point at which the Beighton branch left the main line, running northwards from the west end of the station; the Midland Railway route passed under the LD&ECR nearby, also running towards the north. In 1899 a south to east curve was laid in, connecting the Midland Railway towards Warsop. This was used by passenger trains between 1899 and 1912.

In 1901 the Great Northern Railway completed its Leen Valley Extension line from Annesley, making a connection into the LD&ECR at Langwith Junction. Passenger trains did not use the connection until 1925. The GNR had been granted running powers from Lincoln to Chesterfield and to Langwith colliery; the LD&ECR got running powers to Kirkby colliery on the Leen Valley extension in exchange. On 1 September 1902 the LD&ECR began running over the Leen Valley extension to and from Pleasley, Teversall, Silverhill and Kirkby collieries.

In 1904 the Midland Railway connected another spur, from south to west. Until 1914 the spur and the LD&ECR line were used by boat trains from St Pancras to Heysham for the Isle of Man ferries on Saturdays. Later the spur was used by passenger trains from Mansfield to Sheffield Midland until 10 September 1939; the trains were formed of LNER (ex-GCR) coaches hauled by an LMS engine.

Langwith Junction passenger station was renamed Shirebrook (North) from 1924.

== Sheffield District Railway ==
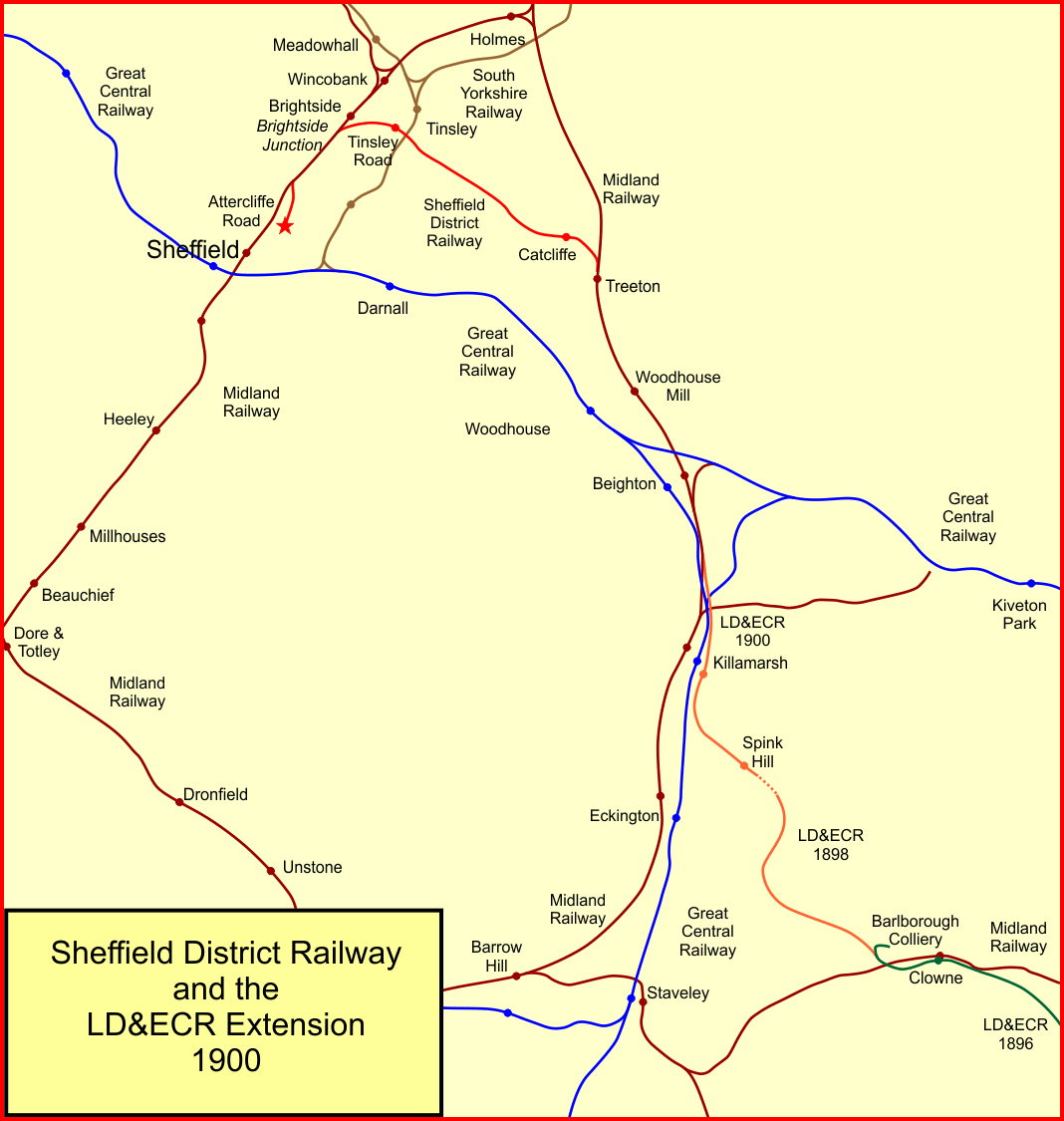
The Sheffield District Railway and the LD&ECR approach, 1900

The LD&ECR had always wanted to reach Sheffield, but running powers over the MS&LR from Beighton were consistently refused. As well as the GER (which sought the access too), independent business interests urged some means of making a connection. A first attempt at a semi-independent line to Sheffield in April 1894 failed, as the LD&ECR was financially embarrassed. A second application to Parliament in 1896 resulted the Sheffield District Railway Act 1897 (60 & 61 Vict. c. cxxxii), for the Sheffield District Railway. This would be a new line running from the LD&ECR at Spink Hill, on the Beighton branch, to a new terminus, Attercliffe, in Sheffield. The company had an authorised capital of £400,000, and it was backed by the Great Eastern and the LD&ECR, both of which would have running powers; the LD&ECR would work the line for 50% of the gross receipts.

Observing this, the Midland Railway offered access over its own line into Sheffield. The LD&ECR was to make a junction with the Midland Railway at Killamarsh. (Note: In fact it was made further north, at Beighton Junction, at the point where the Midland Railway had a facing connection on to the MS&LR.) It could have running powers to Treeton over the Midland Railways' running lines, and it could build its own line from there to Brightside, joining the Midland Railway Rotherham line, and have running powers from there to a point close to the intended Attercliffe terminal. In addition the Midland offered running powers to its main passenger station in Sheffield. This was an attractive offer, saving six miles of new construction, at the cost of a more roundabout route. Construction was quickly started, and the variation on the authorised route was passed by Lancashire, Derbyshire and East Coast Railway Act 1898 (61 & 62 Vict. c. ccxlviii) of 12 August 1898.

In 1897 construction of the LD&ECR Beighton branch north-westwards from Barlborough colliery junction was in progress; the Spink Hill tunnel of 501 yards was the chief engineering feature. The branch was brought into use for coal and goods traffic from Barlborough colliery junction to a new LD&ECR station at Killamarsh, a distance of 4 1/2 miles, together with an intermediate station at Spink Hill, on 21 September 1898, and for all traffic on 1 October 1898. Its extension to the connection with the Midland Railway at Killamarsh (Beighton Junction), a further 1 1/2 miles, was opened on 29 May 1900 for goods traffic, and the following day for passengers. (Note: The route was ceremonially opened on 21 May 1900.) The Great Eastern Railway got access to Sheffield through its running powers agreement with the LD&ECR, a considerable benefit to that company, cheaply obtained. The Attercliffe station was originally conceived as a passenger and goods terminal; passenger terminal facilities were now provided by the Midland Railway at their main station, although a passenger platform was nevertheless constructed at Attercliffe depot; it is doubtful whether it was ever used. (Note: There was an earlier Attercliffe Road station on the Midland Railway, and an Attercliffe station on the MS&LR, both unconnected with this depot.)

Six trains were operated each way daily between Langwith Junction and Sheffield with LD&ECR engines and rolling stock. The last train of the day arrived at Sheffield Midland at 8.27 p.m. (Saturdays excepted), and was worked back empty to Attercliffe yard and attached to the LD&ECR goods train which left for Langwith Junction at 9.30 p.m.

== Mansfield ==
In the autumn of 1896 the company was able to discard earlier plans to build a branch from Edwinstowe to Mansfield, when the Midland Railway agreed to give the LD&ECR and the Great Eastern Railway running powers for goods and coal traffic from Shirebrook to Mansfield. This involved the construction by the LD&ECR of an east to south curve near Langwith Junction, and the cost of building a Mansfield branch was saved; moreover the LD&ECR secured entry to Shirebrook colliery over the Midland Railway. In return, the Midland Railway was given running powers to Edwinstowe.

== Train services ==
The passenger business in the eastern part of the system was disappointing, and early in 1902, the service between Langwith Junction and Lincoln was reduced from three to two trains each way, Mondays to Fridays.

On 1 July 1903 the Midland Railway put on a new passenger service of four trains each way between its stations in Sheffield and Mansfield. They consisted of LD&ECR stock hauled by Midland locomotives, and ran via the Sheffield District, Langwith Junction and Warsop, reversing at Warsop. At the same time a fast Sheffield to Lincoln service was introduced by the Midland, conveying a through carriage between Manchester Central and Harwich, the only express service the LD&ECR enjoyed. The reversal of the Mansfield trains at Warsop was inconvenient, and on 1 October 1904 the Midland Railway commissioned a west curve to the LD&ECR at Shirebrook / Langwith Junction.

Coal trains were worked through to Immingham by the LD&ECR's own engines; these were exclusively tank engines. They took water at Pyewipe Junction and Market Rasen.

== Transfer to the Great Central Railway ==
Great Central and Derbyshire Railways Act 1906
- Act of Parliament
- Parliament of the United Kingdom
- Long title: An Act to authorise the Great Central Railway Company to acquire the Lancashire Derbyshire and East Coast Railway to construct new railways and works in connection therewith and for other purposes.
- Citation: 6 Edw. 7. c. lxxvii

Dates
- Royal assent: 20 July 1906

Although the LD&ECR connection over the Sheffield District Railway into Sheffield was something of a triumph, the plain fact was that the LD&ECR was a small railway dependent on much bigger neighbours. Its Chesterfield terminal was a dead end, and the dreams of reaching the North Sea had long since gone. Sale to a larger company was therefore on the agenda. The Great Eastern Railway had the access it needed by virtue of its running powers, so it had no motivation to purchase the LD&ECR. Accordingly, it fell to the Great Central Railway (the renamed successor to the Manchester, Sheffield and Lincolnshire Railway) to take over the company. This took effect on 1 January 1907 (by the Great Central and Derbyshire Railways Act 1906 (6 Edw. 7. c. lxxvii) of 30 May 1906). Curves were hastily laid in at Duckmanton, between Chesterfield and Bolsover, to connect the Great Central Railway directly to the LD&ECR routes; there was no pre-existing connection. A spur was later laid at Beighton between the GCR and the LD&ECR there.

The passenger vehicle fleet transferred amounted to 63 vehicles; there were 1,271 goods vehicles and a number of auxiliary vehicles.

== Grouping of the railways ==
In 1923 most of the main line railways of Great Britain were "grouped" into one or other of four new large companies, following the Railways Act 1921. The Great Central was a constituent of the new London and North Eastern Railway, the LNER; the Great Northern Railway was also a constituent of this company. The Midland Railway was a constituent of the London Midland and Scottish Railway, the LMS.

== Train service withdrawals and line closures ==
The LD&ECR route had originally been planned as a mineral railway, and in the twentieth century it struggled to sustain a passenger service. The Beighton branch from Shirebrook North and the Sheffield District Railway ceased to have passenger trains from 11 September 1939. (Note: The Sheffield District Railway resumed passenger operation on 6 October 1946, but stopped passenger working on 17 March 1947.) The trains between Chesterfield and Shirebrook North (later Langwith Junction) stopped from 3 December 1951, due to structural problems in Bolsover Tunnel. Passenger trains from Shirebrook North to Lincoln stopped running from 19 September 1955.

Markham Colliery traffic was now routed via Markham Junction, reverse, and the Duckmanton connections; this was discontinued from 1954.

Goods trains continued to run to Chesterfield using the Duckmanton connections until March 1957, when the service was cut back to Arkwright Town. This traffic too was discontinued on 2 February 1963. Summer seasonal excursion trains continued to run to Skegness until 5 September 1964. The last passenger usage of the line was a subsidised annual day trip organised by the Ollerton and Bevercotes Miners Welfare for the benefit of the local community. This consisted of a number of trains departing Ollerton at various times of the morning to Skegness, returning to Ollerton the same evening. Referred to locally as the 'Pit Trip', this annual excursion continued until around 1970.

Goods ceased over the remaining route east of High Marnham in 1980 after an accident at Clifton-on-Trent damaged the track beyond economic repair. The section through Ollerton to High Marnham power station continued, but this ceased when the power station closed in 2003.

The Beighton line was closed to local passenger services from 10 September 1939; excursions continued. The line closed as a through route on 9 January 1967; colliery traffic continued to use the line as far south as Westhorpe.

When High Marnham Power Station closed in 2003, a major source of business was lost. As of 10 August 2013 production at the sole remaining colliery in the Nottinghamshire coalfield – Thoresby – hung by a thread.

As of 10 August 2013 the only other source of revenue was traffic to and from W H Davis's wagon works at Langwith Junction which is accessed via a single line connection known to former Langwith Junction railwaymen as the "New Found Out". This track is a south-to-west connection which leaves the Robin Hood Line opposite Shirebrook Junction signalbox. The track and its west-to-south flyover counterpart were lifted shortly after World War II. The south-to-west curve was relaid in 1974; it gives access to the wagon works via a headshunt in what was Shirebrook North's platform 4.

== Tuxford Rail Innovation and Development Centre ==
The only substantial part of the line still in use is (as of 2019) at the Tuxford Rail Innovation and Development Centre, formerly known as the High Marnham Test Track, and the connection to it from junctions at Shirebrook. It formerly served High Marnham power station and various collieries, all of which are closed.

From January 2010, Network Rail has put the facility to use, with several examples on the internet.

At least two special trains have run over the line, one being on 5 January 2013.

== The original planned route ==
The route authorised in the original act of Parliament was broadly west to east, with several spurs and branches connecting to other railways. Only the central section from Chesterfield to Pyewipe Junction, near Lincoln, and the Beighton branch, were actually built.

=== West of Chesterfield ===
The projected route was to start from an inland port on the Manchester Ship Canal at Latchford, near Warrington, with also a short spur to the River Mersey; it was to proceed south eastward, and pass to the south of Knutsford where a short spur would make a branch with the Cheshire Lines Railway, giving access from Chester. It would then continue eastward to Prestbury, making a junction with a new branch line from near Cheadle, where there would be a junction with the Midland Railway line at Heaton Mersey station (giving access towards Manchester over the Manchester South District Line and to the Cheshire Lines Committee at Heaton Mersey Junction), to the London and North Western Railway Stockport and Warrington line, and to Stockport on the LNWR Crewe to Manchester line.

From Prestbury the line was to pass near Macclesfield the line was planned to run through Macclesfield and Rainow. It passed Macclesfield, almost completely circling it before travelling eastward once again, passing to the north of Goyt's Moss in the Derbyshire Peak District, through what is now Lamaload Reservoir and Wild Moor. In doing so it would have to pass the ridge close to the Cat and Fiddle Road (which peaks at an altitude of 1,690 feet (520 m)), before dropping southward to Burbage and Buxton, where the station would have been close to the Town Hall and Market Place.

The Upper Goyt Valley at that time supported thriving coal and lead production. The distance from Macclesfield to Buxton, itself at about 100 feet (30 m), is 10 miles (16 km), requiring a climb of 600 feet (180 m) in that distance.

Passing Buxton to the south along Ashwood Dale, it would have passed through Blackwell, then crossing the Midland Railway line at Monsal Dale with a viaduct 300 feet (91 m) above the river bed; John Noble, a Midland director, remarked, "I shall believe in that viaduct when I see it!" From there the line would run to Newbold Fields where there would be a branch from Sheepbridge, where there was a major ironworks, then turn southeast to enter Chesterfield.

=== From Chesterfield to Pyewipe Junction ===
The portion from Chesterfield to Lincoln was actually built. On leaving Chesterfield a viaduct, 700 feet (210 m) long and 63 feet (19 m) in height, crossed the Midland Railway main line, the MS&LR Chesterfield loop and the Derby–Chesterfield road. Steel girders of 115-foot (35 m) span traversed the first and three steel spans the second, the remainder consisting of seven brick arches, some on the skew, and varying in span from 30 to 58 feet (9.1 to 17.7 m), making it one of the most unusual viaducts in the country. After a 65-foot (20 m) deep cutting there was the 501-yard (458 m) Duckmanton Tunnel, and shortly further on a brick viaduct of eight arches, 370 feet (110 m) in length and 70 feet (21 m) high. An embankment at Bolsover was nearly 80 feet (24 m) high, and then followed the 2,624-yard (2,399 m) Bolsover Tunnel. During the final stages of construction fractures and distortion occurred because of water in the limestone, and the engineers had to resort to inverting. This was still proceeding when passenger train services began and, until it was finished, traffic had to be worked single line between Bolsover and Scarcliffe. The percolation of water at the eastern end of Bolsover tunnel and in Scarcliffe cutting yielded some 200,000 imperial gallons (910 m^{3}) a day and gave the Bolsover Urban District Council the bulk of its supply. East of Bolsover Tunnel was a long rock cutting which cut through the crest south of Scarcliffe. This was the summit of the line as built. A branch was built from Langwith northward to Beighton. The line as actually constructed passed to the south of Bolsover itself, rather than to the north as originally proposed.

The main line continued eastward to Ollerton, where there was to be a junction with the proposed Newark and Ollerton Railway (never actually built). Continuing to Tuxford, the line was to cross the GNR main line, and connect to it with a west to north spur. Between Fledborough and Clifton-on-Trent the River Trent was crossed by a long viaduct of 59 brick arches (Fledborough Viaduct), each of 30-foot (9.1 m) span, and four steel girder river spans, each of 110 feet (34 m). The viaduct consumed 9 million bricks and 800 long tons (810 tonnes) of steel and cost about £65,000. Continuing past Skellingthorpe it ran on towards Lincoln, joining the GN and GE Joint Line at Pyewipe Junction.

=== From Pyewipe to Sutton-on-Sea ===
The originally planned route continued before Pyewipe, passing over the Joint Line and then under Lincoln in tunnel just south of the cathedral. A station east of the city centre was planned, with a spur connecting back towards Nottingham on the Midland Railway route, and another connecting to the MS&LR line towards Market Rasen, and a third to the GNR line towards Boston. The line would continue immediately south of the Market Rasen line and eastward over the Lincolnshire Wolds, with a junction near Stainfield as it crossed the GNR Louth to Bardney line. Continuing well to the north of Horncastle it would have crossed the East Lincolnshire Railway to the southwest of Alford, then joining that line's loop (at that time known as the Willoughby Railway) at Mumby Road on the GNR Sutton & Willoughby Railway, continuing to Sutton-on-Sea by means of running powers, entering the new docks close to Sutton-on-Sea station.

== Motive power ==
=== Locomotives ===
The company had 37 locomotives divided into four classes, all of which were built by Kitson & Co of Leeds:

- Class A, 18 0-6-2T built 1895–1900 for goods trains, which became LNER class N6 and were withdrawn between 1933 and 1938
- Class B, 4 0-6-0T built 1897 for shunting, which became LNER class J60 and were withdrawn between 1947 and 1948
- Class C, 6 0-4-4T built 1897–1898 for passenger trains, which became LNER class G3 and were withdrawn between 1931 and 1935
- Class D, 9 0-6-4T built 1904–1906 for coal trains, which became LNER class M1 and were withdrawn between 1939 and 1947

All passed to the Great Central Railway and their successor the London and North Eastern Railway; but only two (both of Class B) survived long enough to be inherited by British Railways.

=== Tuxford locomotive works ===
A small establishment for the maintenance of the company's locomotives was built at Tuxford; it employed about 130 men; only four locomotives could be maintained at once. Nearby there were carriage and wagon shops which could handle four carriages and 20 wagons simultaneously. The loco works was kept fully utilised by the GCR, but the LNER closed it in May 1927.

=== Locomotive Superintendents ===
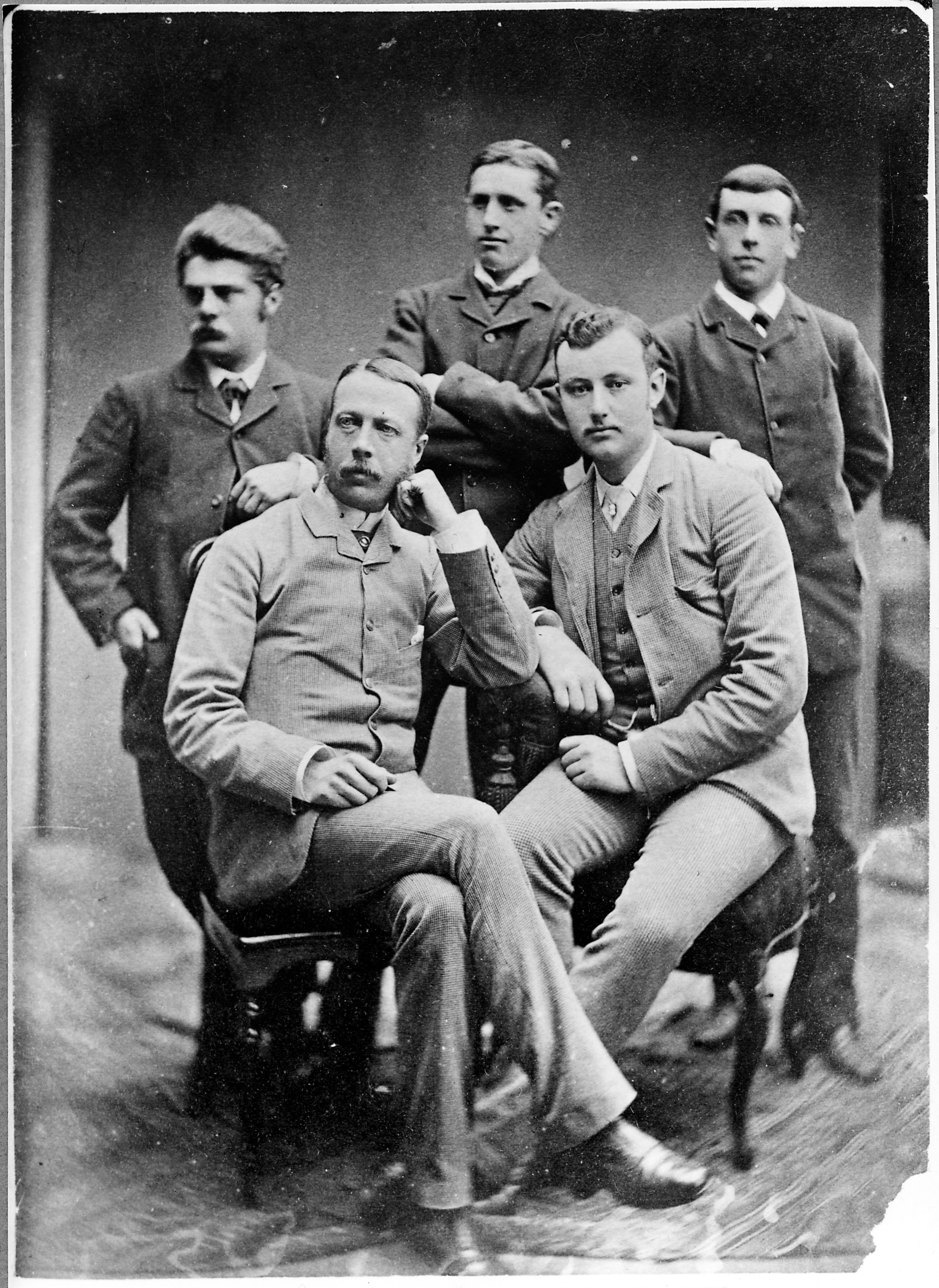
Broxup with three other English engineers and Henrik Wennerström (standing left), in the 1880s

The first locomotive superintendent was Charles Thomas Broxup, who was appointed on 1 July 1896, having served as temporary locomotive inspector from May 1895. Like most of his successors, his term of office was short, since he resigned in May 1897. His former duties were then combined with those of the maintenance engineer, and T.B. Grierson served as Maintenance Engineer & Locomotive Superintendent from 14 March 1898, but he resigned in December the same year. The post was then split again, and William Greenhalgh was appointed Locomotive Superintendent on 21 April 1899; he resigned on 15 June 1900 because locomotives which he was responsible for had not been properly maintained. James Conner was appointed next, on 11 September 1900, but he later resigned with effect from 31 December 1901. His successor, J.W. Dow, only served seven months, from 1 January 1902 until 31 July 1902, during which time the job was downgraded to Locomotive Inspector. On 24 October 1902, Robert Absalom Thom was appointed Locomotive Inspector; later the post once again became Locomotive Superintendent, and he remained in office until the end of the company's existence in 1906.

== Locations ==
=== Main line west to east ===
- Chesterfield; opened 8 March 1897; renamed Chesterfield Market Place 1 January 1907; closed 3 December 1951;
- Calow Junction Halt; colliers' unadvertised halt; opened by 1 October 1910; closed by 13 July 1914;
- Calow Junction; connection to Calow Colliery;
- Duckmanton Tunnel; 501 yards;
- Arkwright Town; opened 8 March 1897; closed 3 December 1951;
- Arkwright Town Junction; trailing connection from Great Central Railway connections, 1907 to 1973;
- Markham Junction; trailing connection from Bolsover Colliery and Markham Colliery, 1897 - 1951;
- Bolsover; opened 8 March 1897; renamed Bolsover South 25 September 1950; closed 3 December 1951;
- Bolsover Tunnel; 1 mile 864 yards;
- Scarcliffe; opened 1 January 1898; closed 3 December 1951;
- Langwith Junction; opened 8 March 1897; renamed Shirebrook North 2 June 1924; closed 19 September 1955; advertised summer Saturdays usage continued to 5 September 1964; trailing connection from Beighton branch 1896 - 1974; facing connection to GNR Leen Valley line 1901 - 1968; facing connection to Midland Railway; renamed Shirebrook North;
- Warsop; opened 8 March 1897; closed 19 September 1955; advertised summer Saturday use continued to 2 September 1961, then again from 22 June 1963 until 5 September 1964 (last); there were later excursions;
- Edwinstowe; opened 15 December 1896; closed 2 January 1956; advertised summer Saturday services to seaside continued until 5 September 1964, then occasionally until 1972;
- Ollerton; opened 15 December 1896; closed 19 September 1955; advertised summer Saturday use continued to 5 September 1964; occasional later excursions until 1972;
- Boughton; opened 8 March 1897; closed 19 September 1955;
- Tuxford Central; opened 15 December 1896; closed 19 September 1955; later excursion use;
- Dukeries Junction; opened 1 June 1897; closed 6 March 1950; the name Tuxford Junction was used at first;
- Fledborough; opened 15 December 1896; closed 19 September 1955;
- Clifton-on-Trent; opened 15 December 1896; closed 19 September 1955;
- Doddington & Harby; opened 1 January 1897; closed 19 September 1955;
- Pyewipe Junction.

=== Beighton line, north to south ===
- Beighton Junction; connection to Midland Railway;
- Killamarsh South Junction; later connection to Manchester, Sheffield and Lincolnshire Railway;
- Upperthorpe & Killamarsh; opened as Killamarsh 1 October 1898; renamed Upperthorpe & Killamarsh 1 January 1907; closed 7 July 1930;
- Spink Hill; opened 1 October 1898; closed 11 September 1939; used for school specials until at least 1958;
- Spink Hill Tunnel; 501 yards;
- Barlborough Colliery;
- Clowne; opened 8 March 1897; closed 11 September 1939; the goods station was renamed Clowne South in 1951; excursions to seaside were run from there in 1952 and 1960 at least; in 1961 every Saturday from 17 June 1961 to 8 September 1962;
- Clowne, connection to Midland Railway;
- Creswell & Welbeck; opened 1 June 1897; closed 11 September 1939;
- Langwith Junction, above.

== Colliery and other connections ==
In 1898, by the granting of running powers over the Great Northern Railway from Langwith to Kirkby Summit, access to four more collieries was obtained. Several more were connected later by new branch lines, in many cases after acquisition by the Manchester, Sheffield and Lincolnshire Railway, and subsequent organisational ownership changes:

=== Main line, west to east ===
- Calow Junction; the LD&ECR Branch was 1.5 miles long; it descended to the valley of the Calow Brook, around 100 feet lower, at a gradient of l in 50/54, before going up a steep grade into Bonds Main Colliery

sidings. The first section from Calow junction to Calow Main opened in November 1899. The joint line (with the GCR) on to Bonds Main opened on 6 May 1901. The LC&EDR Section was difficult to work because of the gradients, and after the GCR take-over they closed it, on 15 November 1909, using the access from their own line;

- Markham and Bolsover Collieries; connected from Markham Junction, 1897 - 1915; this was the westernmost point to which GER trains worked in LD&ECR days; there were two colliers' halts on the branch: Bolsover Colliery Halt at what is now the A632 Chesterfield Road bridge, and at Markham Colliery itself; Markham Colliery and Bolsover Colliery closed in 1996;
- Welbeck Colliery, connected from Welbeck Junction 19 April 1915; a branch line three miles in length was privately owned by the colliery; it was acquired by the LNER on 31 December 1927; the pit closed in 2011;
- Clipstone Junctions for the Mansfield Railway; opened in 1916 connecting at Clipstone East Junction (facing Lincoln); a west curve to Clipstone West Junction was added in 1918; The line closed in 1980.
- Thoresby Colliery, on a short branch from Thoresby Colliery Junction, facing Lincoln; the colliery closed in 2015;
- Ollerton Colliery; a substantial colliery with a large siding network established alongside the main line on the north side, east of Ollerton station, in 1927. The Mid-Notts Joint Railway (joint LMS and LNER) opened in 1931 and connected in to the Ollerton Colliery complex, and also into the former LD&ECR main line, facing Chesterfield. Boughton Camp, a US Army stores depot was established immediately east of the junctions during World War II. The railway connection was disconnected in 1960 or 1961.
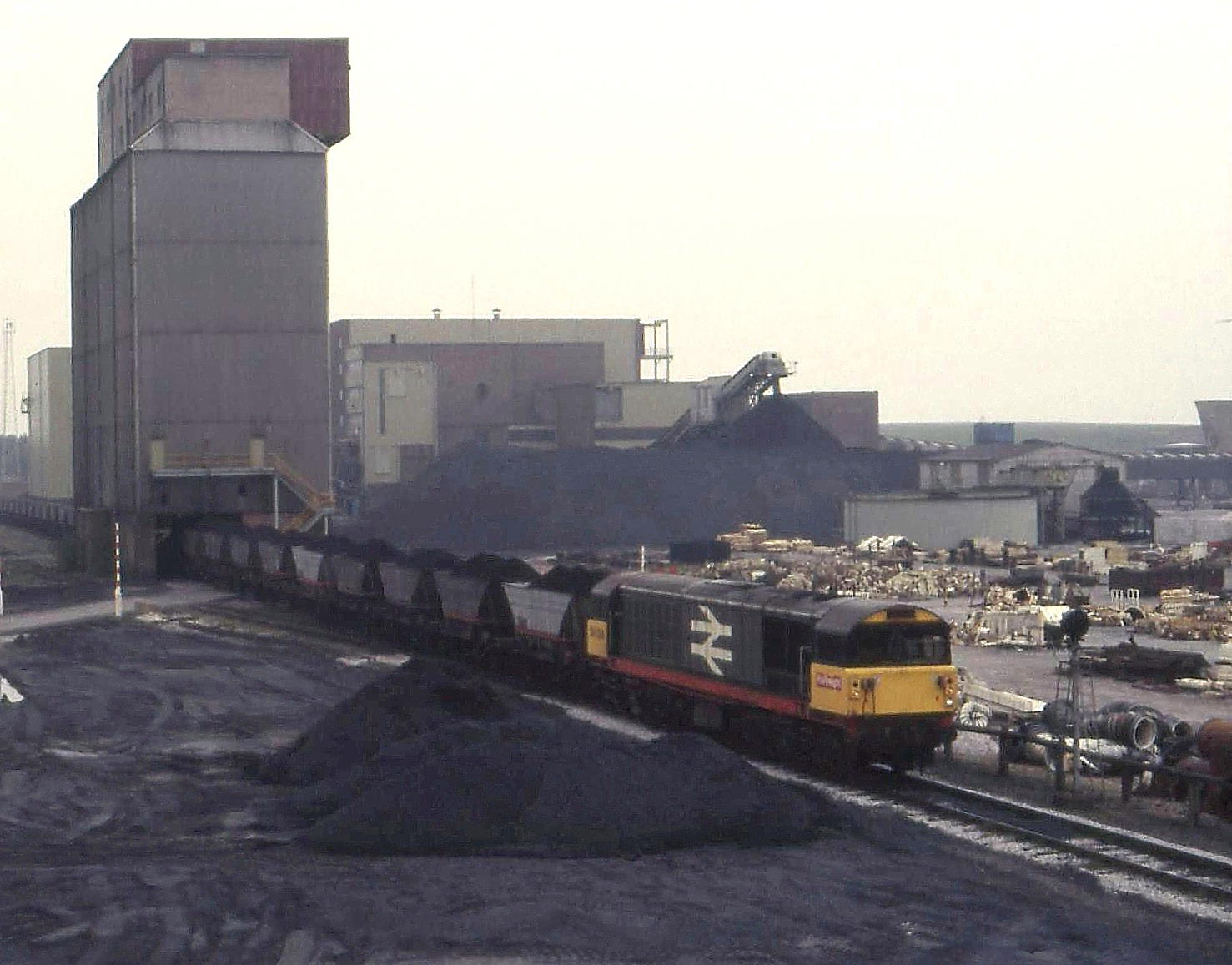
- Bevercotes Colliery in 2007
  A new pit was sunk, known as Bevercotes Colliery, about 5 miles north-east of Ollerton, and a single track branch from what became Boughton Junction was opened in 1955 for the construction. The 4.5 mi (7.2 km) branch ran north from the main line and opened for traffic in June 1960. The steepest section was 1,030 yd (940 m) at 1 in 199. About half the railway was in cutting and half on banks. Some 370,000 yd^{3} (280,000 m^{3}) of fill was used in the embankments, two-thirds of which came from the cuttings and the rest from a disused spur at Ollerton and a borrow pit beside the mine. The line had 11 bridges and a 350 yd (320 m) tunnel, built to preserve farmland. The largest bridge was the eastern approach from the main line, on a viaduct over 1,000 ft (300 m) long, on 37 spans. The line crossed the Rivers Meden and Maun and the A52. The A52 bridge was on steel girder spans of 50 ft (15 m) and 48.5 ft (14.8 m) and was removed between 2017 and 2019. The pit opened in the early 1960s, but unforeseen serious faulting severely hampered its productivity. It was claimed to be the first fully automated colliery, and also the first to be fully equipped to load coal into merry-go-round trains. The colliery closed in 1993, and the branch line closed after removal of coal stockpiles.
- High Marnham was a technically advanced high capacity power station; it came on stream in 1959. Its last revenue earning rail movement was in 2003.

=== Beighton line, north to south ===
- There was a brickworks at Westhorpe, opened in 1920, and an associated colliery from 1928, until 1971 from which time the coal was brought to surface elsewhere;
- Parkhall Colliery, half a mile east of the line just south of Spink Hill tunnel; a tramway brought coal down the hillside; it opened in 1907 but was unprofitable and closed in 1908;
- Hazel Brickworks was north of Clowne about half a mile east of the line and at much higher level; the owners decided to reopened a derelict coal mine as fuel for firing bricks; a pre-existing derelict tramway for a defunct coal mine had an incline down to LD&ECR sidings; it closed in 1917, coal production having stopped in 1914;
- Barlborough collieries were centuries old and were connected to the LD&ECR when it was built; Oxcroft collieries were added to the complex; they ceased production in 1974;
- Creswell colliery was working in 1897, and closed in 1991; it was also served by the Midland Railway;
- Langwith Colliery Junction led to the colliery, which opened in 1878; it ceased work in 1978, but the connection from the former LD&ECR line closed in September 1969; the former Midland Railway route was used after that;

== Further material ==
- Bailey, Brian C (February 2013). Hawkins, Chris (ed.). "Langwith Junction Shed Until the End of Steam ... and Beyond". British Railways Illustrated. 22 (5). Clophill, Bedfordshire: Irwell Press Ltd. ISSN 0961-8244.
- Cupit, Jack (September 1956). Allen, G. Freeman (ed.). "The Lancashire, Derbyshire & East Coast Railway, Part One". Trains Illustrated. IX (9). Hampton Court, Surrey: Ian Allan Ltd.
- Cupit, Jack (October 1956). Allen, G. Freeman (ed.). "The Lancashire, Derbyshire & East Coast Railway, Part Two". Trains Illustrated. IX (10). Hampton Court, Surrey: Ian Allan Ltd.
- DVD1 (2005). The Lancashire, Derbyshire and East Coast Railway - Memories of a Lost Route. Chesterfield: Terminus Publications. DVD, stills with commentary, 61 mins.
- DVD2 (2005). Diesels Along:-The Lancashire, Derbyshire and East Coast Railway. Chesterfield: Terminus Publications. DVD, stills and film with commentary, 60 mins.
- Felix, Richard; McKeown, Ron (2004) [1968]. Farewell to the GNR lines in Derbyshire and Nottinghamshire. Derby: Local Videos 2004 Ltd. DVD.
- Fox, Ray; Kinder, Mike; Briggs, John (June 2011). Hawkins, Chris (ed.). "The Job Langwith Shed, Saturday Afternoon 22 May 1965". British Railways Illustrated. 20 (9). Clophill, Bedfordshire: Irwell Press Ltd. ISSN 0961-8244.
- Grainger, Ken (2002). Sheffield Victoria to Chesterfield Central, The "Derbyshire Lines" of the Manchester, Sheffield and Lincolnshire Railway Part 1. Bredbury, Cheshire: Foxline Limited. ISBN 978-1-870119-83-2.
- Little, Lawson (1995). Langwith Junction, the Life and Times of a Railway Village. Newark: Vesper Publications. ISBN 978-0-9526171-0-5.
- Little, Lawson (Summer 2002a). Bell, Brian (ed.). "Lancashire, Derbyshire & East Coast Railway A personal View 1945–74 (Part I)". Forward. 132. Holton le Clay, Grimsby: Brian Bell for the Great Central Railway Society. ISSN 0141-4488.
- Little, Lawson (Autumn 2002b). Bell, Brian (ed.). "Lancashire, Derbyshire & East Coast Railway (Part II) A lineside look at Langwith Junction: (1) the 1940s". Forward. 133. Holton le Clay, Grimsby: Brian Bell for the Great Central Railway Society. ISSN 0141-4488.
- Ludlam, A.J. (March 2013). Kennedy, Rex (ed.). "The Lancashire, Derbyshire & East Coast Railway". Steam Days. 283. Bournemouth: Redgauntlet 1993 Publications. ISSN 0269-0020.
- Gilks, David (April 2002). Blakemore, Michael (ed.). "Mr. Arkwright's Railway". Back Track. 16 (4). Penryn: Atlantic Publishers.
- Little, Lawson (Winter 2002). Bell, Brian (ed.). "Lancashire, Derbyshire & East Coast Railway (Part III) Brief History of Tuxford". Forward. 134. Holton le Clay, Grimsby: Brian Bell for the Great Central Railway Society. ISSN 0141-4488.
- Little, Lawson (Spring 2003). Bell, Brian (ed.). "Lancashire, Derbyshire & East Coast Railway (Part IV) A personal View 1945–74, Chesterfield". Forward. 135. Holton le Clay, Grimsby: Brian Bell for the Great Central Railway Society. ISSN 0141-4488.
