= Skellingthorpe =

Village and civil parish in Lincolnshire, England

Coordinates: 53°14′08″N 0°37′07″W

- Village and civil parish
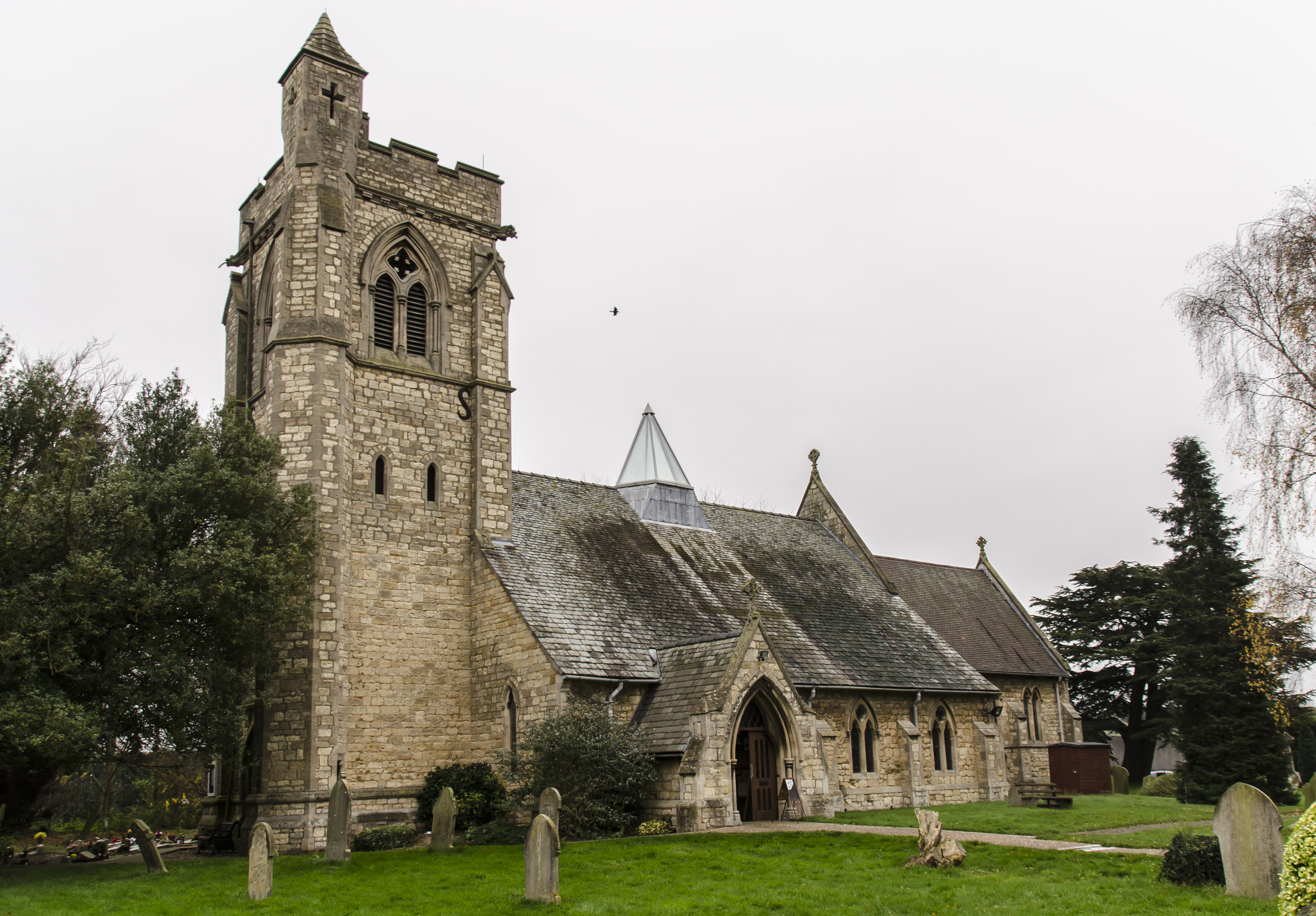
- St Lawrence's Church

- Location within Lincolnshire
- Population: 3,465 (2011)
- OS grid reference: SK924719
  - London: 125 mi (201 km) S
- District: North Kesteven
- Shire county: Lincolnshire
- Region: East Midlands
- Country: England
- Sovereign state: United Kingdom
- Post town: Lincoln
- Postcode district: LN6
- Police: Lincolnshire
- Fire: Lincolnshire
- Ambulance: East Midlands
- UK Parliament: Lincoln

Skellingthorpe is a village and civil parish in the North Kesteven district of Lincolnshire, England. The population of the village at the 2011 census was 3,465. It is situated 3 miles (5 km) west of Lincoln, 4 miles (6 km) southeast of Saxilby, 6 miles (10 km) northwest of North Hykeham and 15 miles (24 km) east of Tuxford.

The village of Doddington and Doddington Hall lie 1 mile (1.6 km) to the south-west. Birchwood estate, built in the 1970s on the site of RAF Skellingthorpe, is 2.5 miles (4 km) to the south-east.

== Toponymy ==
The earliest-known spelling of its name, Scheldinchope, suggests an enclosure in marsh associated with a man named Sceld. Another theory for the name is that it derives from the Anglo-Saxon words 'scilling' (shilling) and 'thorf' (village) – the 'shilling village'.

Domesday Book (1086) records the name "Scheldinchope" and that it contained 12 carucates of land worked by 18 villeins, two sokemen and four bordars.

Up until the second half of the 18th century Skellingthorpe was pronounced and written ‘Skeldingthorpe’. A periodical in 1785 refers to the presentation of the Rev George Hare to the 'vicarage of Skellen-thorpe otherwise Skeldingthorpe, in the diocese of Lincoln’.

== History ==
A small paleolith found in gravel was presented to the British Museum in 1922, hinting at the presence of some ancient tribe. An ancient hand-axe was reported as being discovered in gravel ballast during the construction of the railway line in 1897. The area was marsh and woodland at the time of the Romans and there is no evidence of a permanent settlement by ancient Britons, although it is possible that nomadic forest or swamp dwellers occasionally passed through. Roman engineers excavating what is now the Foss Dyke were in the vicinity c. 120 AD as evidenced by a Roman bowl found in the parish. Other Roman-era discoveries include a copper alloy bell found in Main Drain, and 13 coins (dated to the third or fourth century) unearthed in 1978.

The settlement may have originated with Danish occupiers. Around 1953 a blue and white ring (dated by the British Museum to c. 875 AD) was found in Stoney Yard. This and the fact that the Danes established themselves elsewhere in Lincolnshire by the year 876 reinforce the supposition that Skellingthorpe became a settlement in the late 9th century.

In the Middle Ages the manor was held by the Norman Wak, or Wake, family. On 4 January 1283 the manor of Skeldingho and all Baldwin's other lands were granted to Edmund, Earl of Cornwall; although Baldwin's widow, Hawisia, and others were allowed their rights as adjudged in the king's court.

By the 1360s the manor had passed to Gilbert de Umfraville, 3rd Earl of Angus and Kyme. By February 1399 the manor of Skellingthorpe was all but deserted, with much land left uncultivated through a lack of tenants. In the May the Rectory was appropriated to the Hospital of Spital in the Street (the Spital Charity) by Thomas de Aston (Canon of Lincoln), and they farmed out the rectorial tithes to laymen. The vicar was paid £5 a year by the charity.

On the attainder of Sir William Tailboys, his estates were escheated to the crown and a portion, including Skellingthorpe, were granted to Thomas Burgh and his male heirs by King Edward IV in 1460.

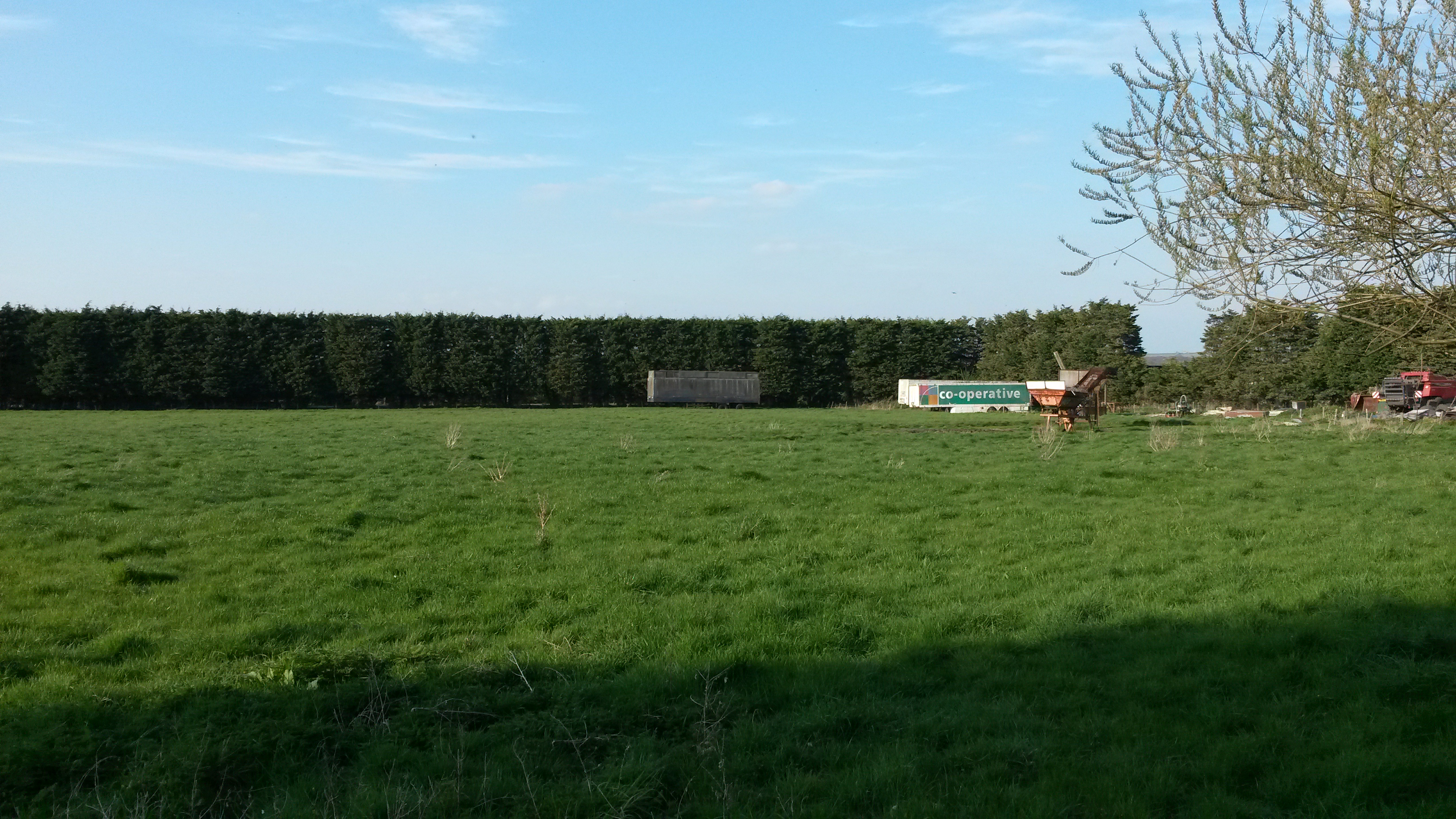
Site of the medieval settlement near Ferry Lane. Depressions in the grass mark the remains of the old fishponds.

The medieval settlement was in the vicinity of Lower Church Road, to the north of the church and most of the present village. There were three sub-rectangular fishponds, orientated north–south, near Manor Farm. It is unknown at what point that settlement became fully deserted. (In 1981, it was reported that the remains of the fishponds, water channels, ridges and furrows were in excellent condition but by 1987 they had been largely obliterated. The site is now largely given over to livestock.)

In 1563, a Record of Marriages was begun for the parish.

The manor was inherited by Henry Stone. He died aged 62 on 26 June 1693, and the following year the governors of 'Christ Hospitall' in London arranged for a tomb to be erected in his memory, which is now in the grounds of the church. As his relatives had all predeceased him, he willed his estate to Christ's Hospital. His will also benefitted neighbours and tenants, local schools and the church.

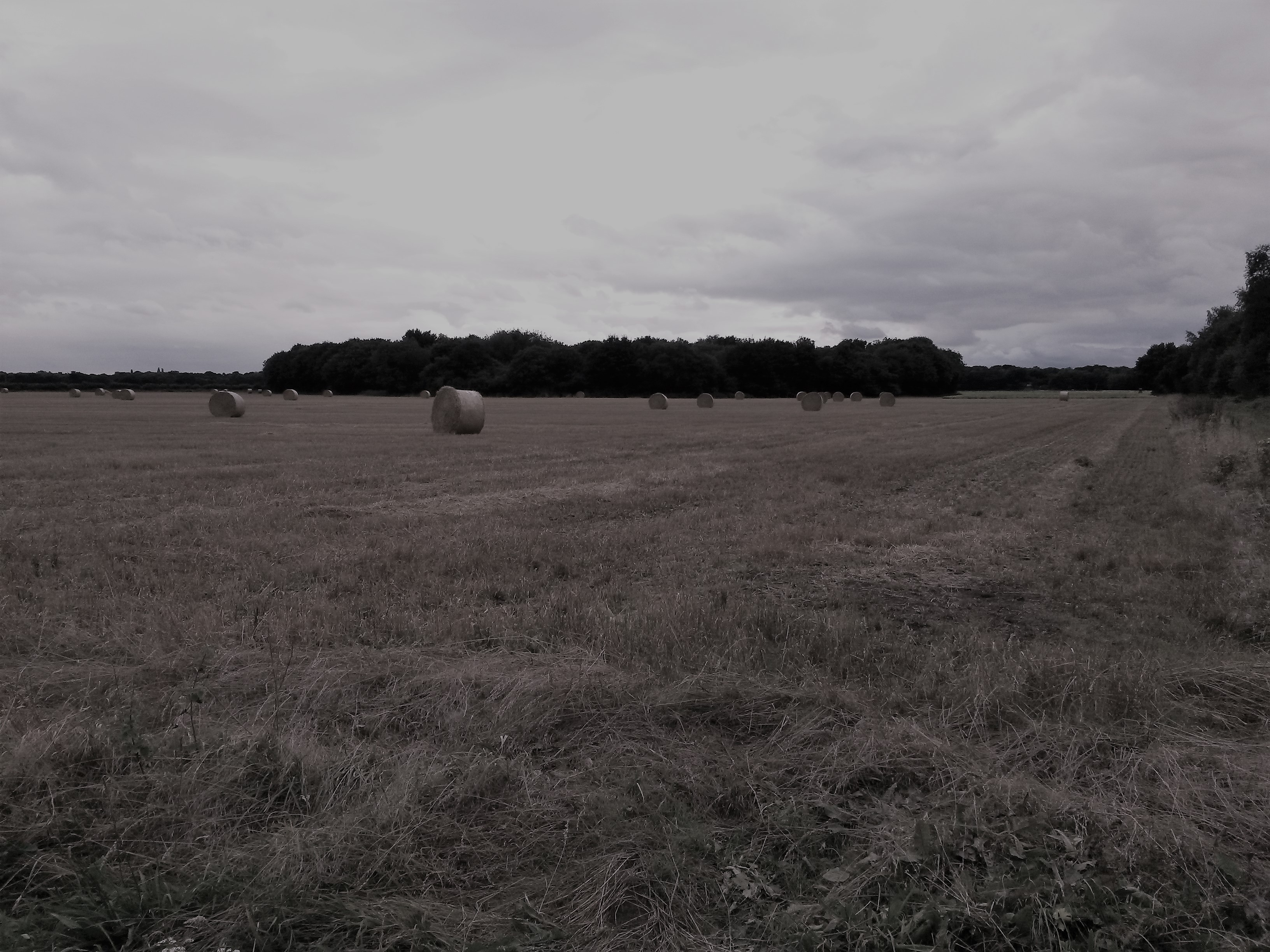
Site of duck decoy

Throughout the late 1600s and early 1700s the village economy stemmed from duck decoys, but began to decline with the drainage and enclosure of the land. The earthwork remains of an old decoy pond, which had been established in 1693, can be found on private land to the east of the village. In 2010 it was announced the surviving decoy pond was one of 79 historic sites to be protected under an environmental stewardship scheme, run by Natural England.

In 1710, surveys by Christ's indicated that Skellingthorpe estate consisted of 2,872 acres let to fourteen tenant farmers, 900 acres was newly planted ground, 600 was uncultivated and the rest was wooded.

An 1872 gazetteer of Skellingthorpe records it as "a scattered, but well-built and pleasant village" which consisted of "726 souls, and 6220 acres of land, extending to the Fossdyke... including 600 acres cleared of plantations, and some fertile and well-drained marshes".

In the 1850s a new National Society School, called St Lawrence's after the adjacent church, was established in 1855. Compulsory attendance was not enforced until 1870.

By the beginning of the 19th century large parts of the parish were still little more than a morass, and the risk of flood was a constant one. The Catchwater Drain was planned from 1805. By the middle of the 19th century, Skellingthorpe had been well-drained for some time and two small steam engines were erected near the Decoy Farm to pump out floodwater.

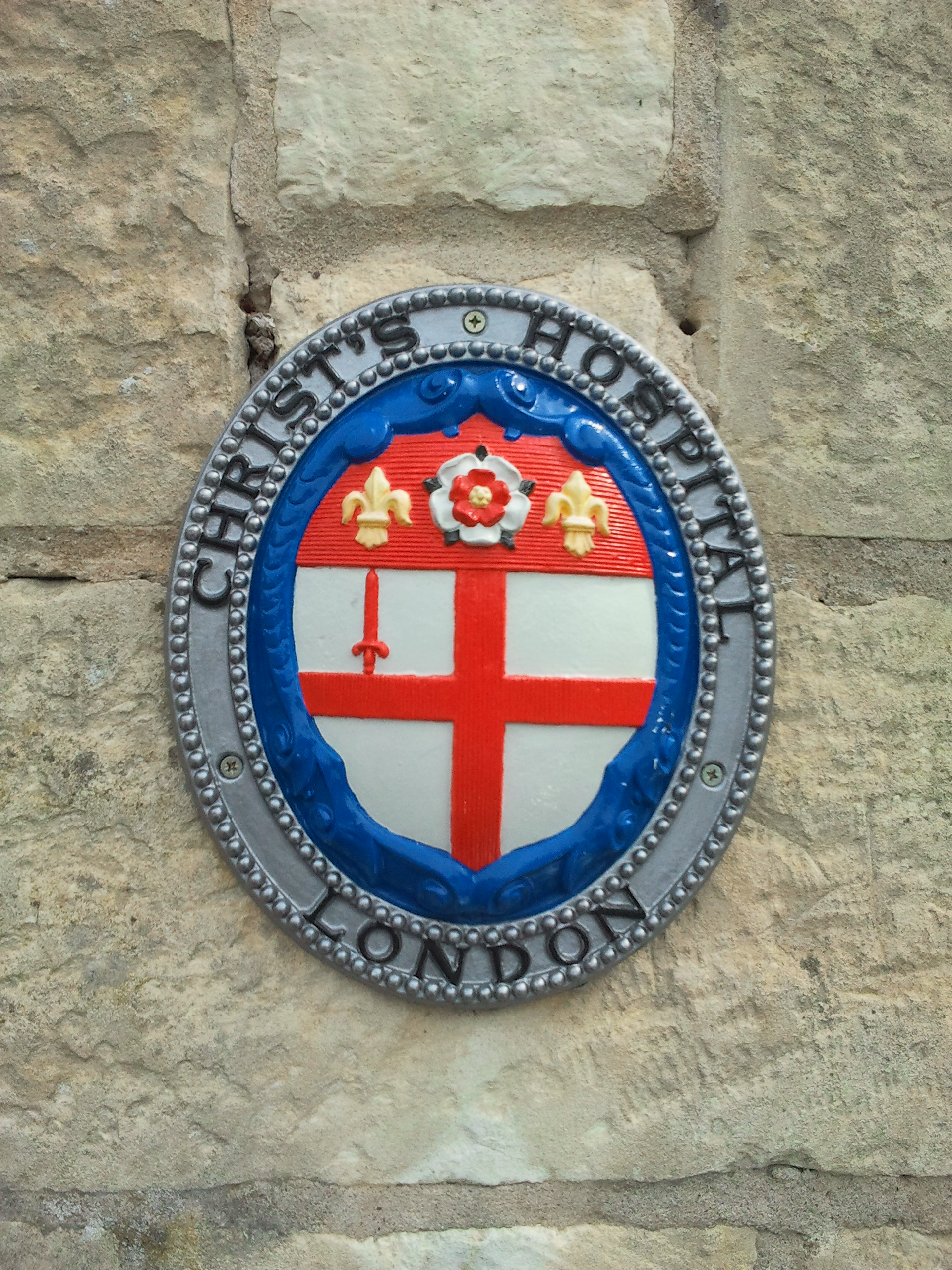
This sign on St Lawrence's School commemorates the link to Christ's

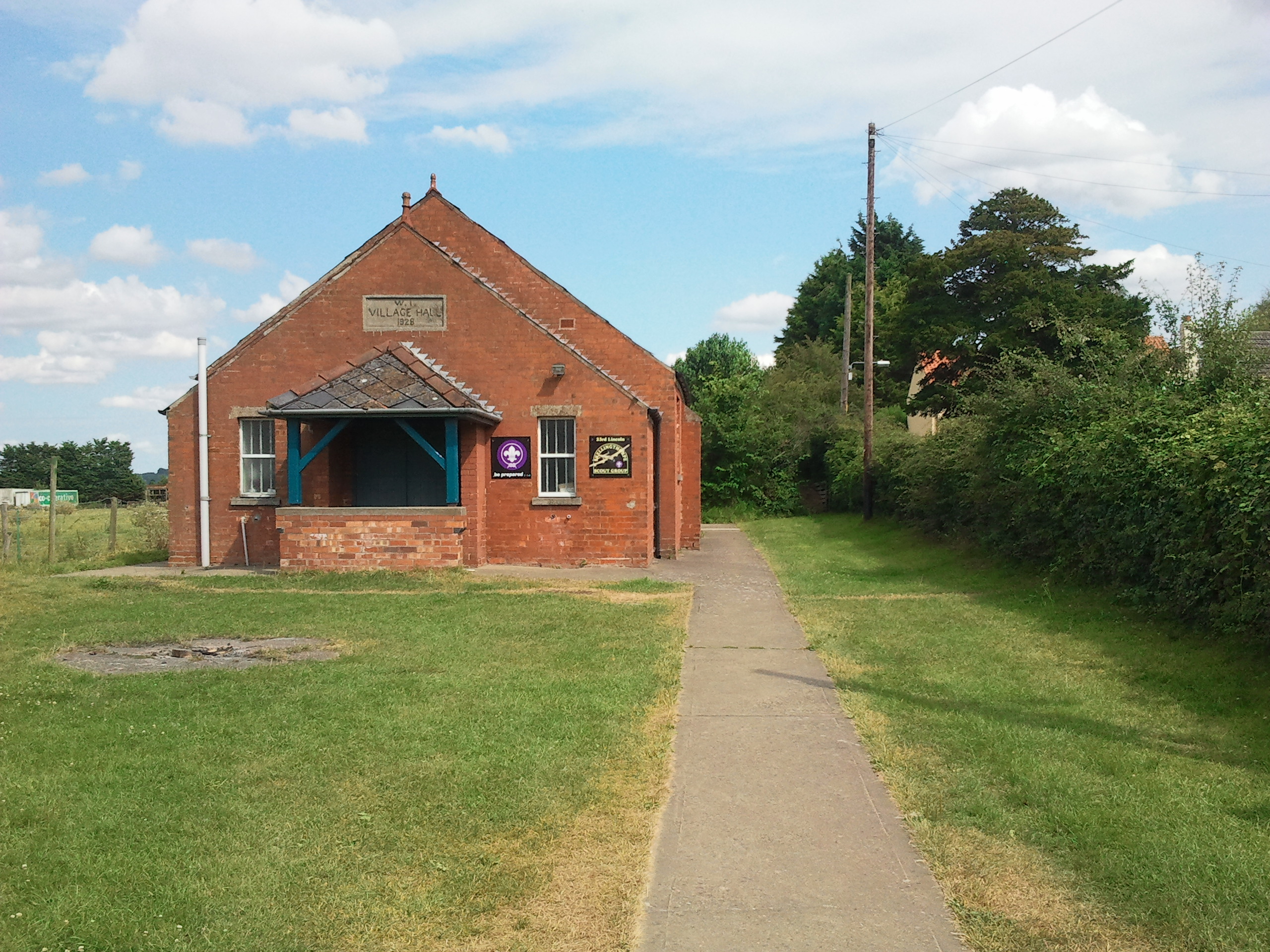
The 1928 Village Hall

In 1905 an epidemic of typhoid swept Lincoln, killing at least 110 people and making over 1,000 ill. It was alleged that Skellingthorpe's Catchwater Drain, which flowed into the city, contributed to this.

In 1914 Christ's Hospital sold off all their properties in the parish, effectively ending a connection between Skellingthorpe and the capital that had existed for over 200 years. A small number of buildings. including St Lawrence's School, still bear Christ's coat of arms on their gables or wall.

During the 1915–1918 aerial bombardment of Britain by German Zeppelins 14 bombs damaged an engine shed and a railway track at Skellingthorpe on the night of 12/13 April 1918.

A war memorial in the church grounds shows that the village lost 19 men during the Great War, and a further five during the Second World War.

In 1948 there was a proposal to develop RAF Skellingthorpe into a civil airport, but it came to naught.

On 15 July 1949 an RAF bomber of 61 Squadron from Waddington crashed near Jerusalem Road, Skellingthorpe.

Electricity and running water came in the 1930s. Before this, houses shared pumps that tapped underground wells. The first street lights were erected in 1956–57. Main drainage came in 1964.

By 1971, Skellingthorpe's population had risen steadily to 2,593. This was more than three times what had been just forty years earlier, and thirteen times what it had been in 1801.

A village hall had been built in 1928. By the 1970s this was judged too small. In 1973 a larger Community Centre and Youth Hall were built on the site of the railway station.

In 1986 the BBC Domesday Reloaded project captured a snapshot of the village. Among the village curiosities was an antiquated post-box that still bore the initials of King George VI, despite that monarch having been dead 34 years by that time.

On 26 July 2010 there was an explosion at a bone-meal factory. A second fire at the same plant occurred in the early hours of 16 August 2011.

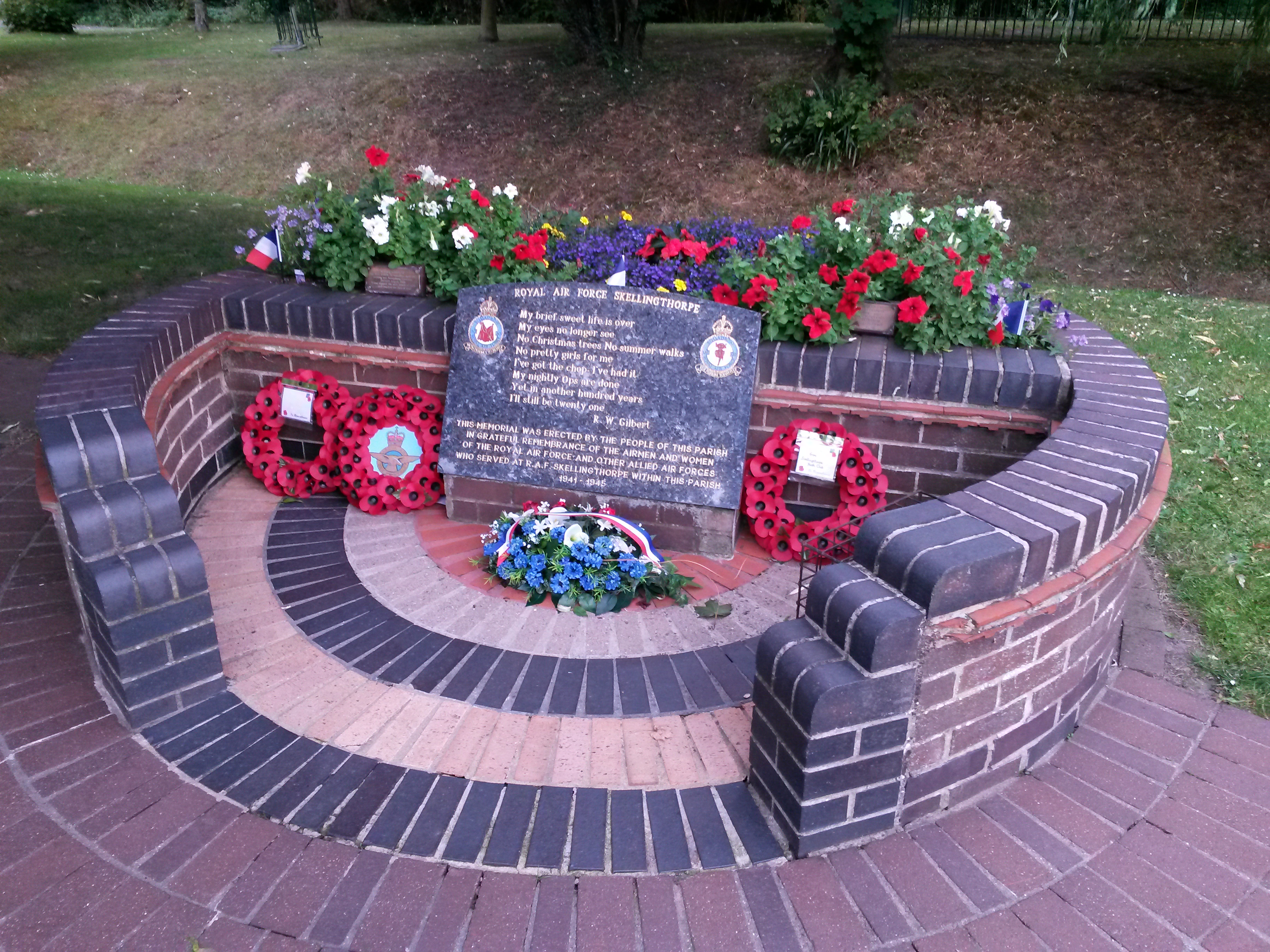
Memorial for RAF Skellingthorpe, decorated with French motifs for a ceremonial visit

In July 2015 an event was held in the village to commemorate an incident in 1944 when a Lancaster Bomber that had taken off from RAF Skellingthorpe was shot down over the French village of La Chapelle-Thecle. Six crewmembers died in the incident, and the villagers of La Chapelle-Thecle defied Nazi occupation to lay flowers on the bodies of the airmen.

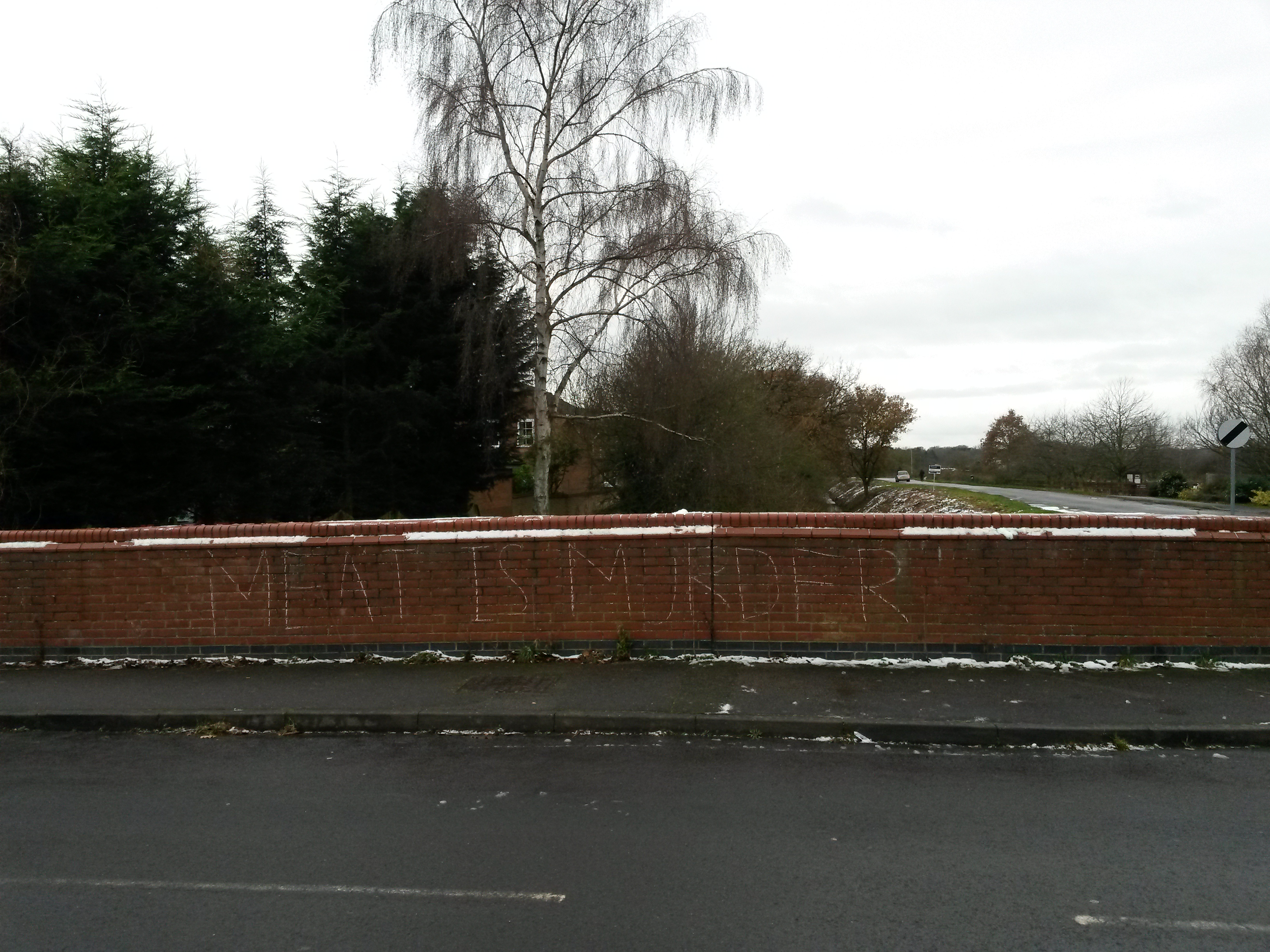
Graffiti on a village bridge following a Cow Save demonstration

A slaughterhouse in Skellingthorpe has been the site of a number of small, and peaceful, demonstrations against the treatment of cattle being transported to the premises. The vigils – called ‘Cow Save’ – were organised by the Boston and Skegness Vegans and Vegetarians Group, and occurred in 2016 and 2017, aiming to highlight what they perceived as the animals’ distress before being slaughtered. Some of the demonstrators requested that the transporting lorries be allowed to stop for three minutes so that the animals could be wished a dignified ‘goodbye’.

== Transport ==
=== Rail ===
Skellingthorpe has been served in the past by two different stations on two different lines. Neither station is now in service.

- Between 1865 and 1868 there was a Skellingthorpe station at the end of Ferry Lane, about 1 mile (1.6 km) northeast of the village, on the Great Northern Railway. Today, the lines through the site are still in use but the platforms are long gone.
- A second Skellingthorpe station was opened in March 1897 by the Lancashire, Derbyshire and East Coast Railway on its main line from Chesterfield to Lincoln. It was closed by British Railways in 1955.

The site of the later station is now occupied by a community centre, park, car park and footpath passing through it. The footpath continues down towards Fledborough in Nottinghamshire via Harby, Doddington, North Clifton, South Clifton and over the listed viaduct near Fledborough. The footpath ends abruptly near Lincoln due to the A46 cutting through part of the former trackbed near Pyewipe Junction.

=== Road ===
In 1985 the Lincoln Relief Road (A46 Bypass) opened. Part of this route skirts the Skellingthorpe Moor Plantation, although this is obscured by trees. There is a roundabout connecting Lincoln Road with Skellingthorpe Road, Birchwood. Further north, the Relief Road briefly enters the parish of Skellingthorpe, west of the Decoy Farm and the Duck Decoy.

== Local buildings ==
=== St. Lawrence's Church ===
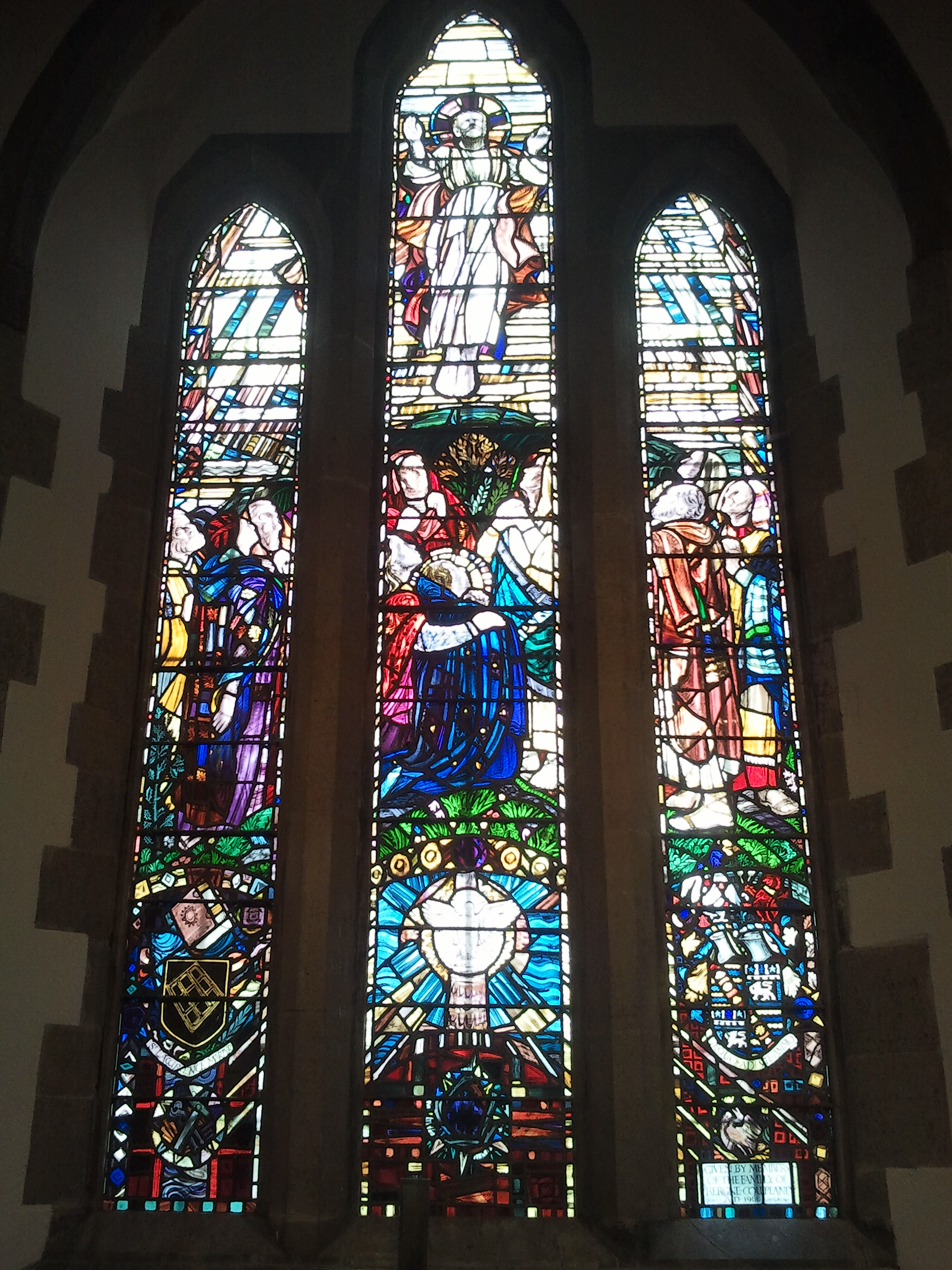
Skellingthorpe church's east window

There has been a place of worship in the village since the beginning of the 13th century: the institution of Robert de Weinflet as chaplain to the church of Skellingthorpe is recorded in 1225. Patent Rolls for 1258 (dated 1 October) refer to the "Presentation of Master Raymond, the Queen's physician, to the church of Skeldinghop in the kings gift".

The church was rebuilt in the 19th century, except the tower and chancel arches, at a cost of £2,800. Its new design was described in an 1865 gazetteer as being ‘in the Early English style, consisting of a nave with clerestory over, aisles, chancel, south porch and a tower crowned by a spire and containing a peal of five bells… The East Window is filled with stained glass, in memory of Richard Carline, Esq., and Mrs. Carline’. When the new church was officially opened in 1855 it rained heavily, but this did not deter the crowds that arrived from great distances to participate in the ceremony.

A fire on Sunday 2 April 1916 that destroyed the interior, two of the bells, the organ, the pulpit, the font, cassocks and prayer books. It also destroyed ‘a list of vicars from the year 1297 up to the present time’.

The East Window was presented in 1961 by the Bergne-Coupland family. It was designed by Edward Payne, of Box, Gloucestershire, and depicts the Ascending Christ and his disciples.

=== Methodist chapel ===
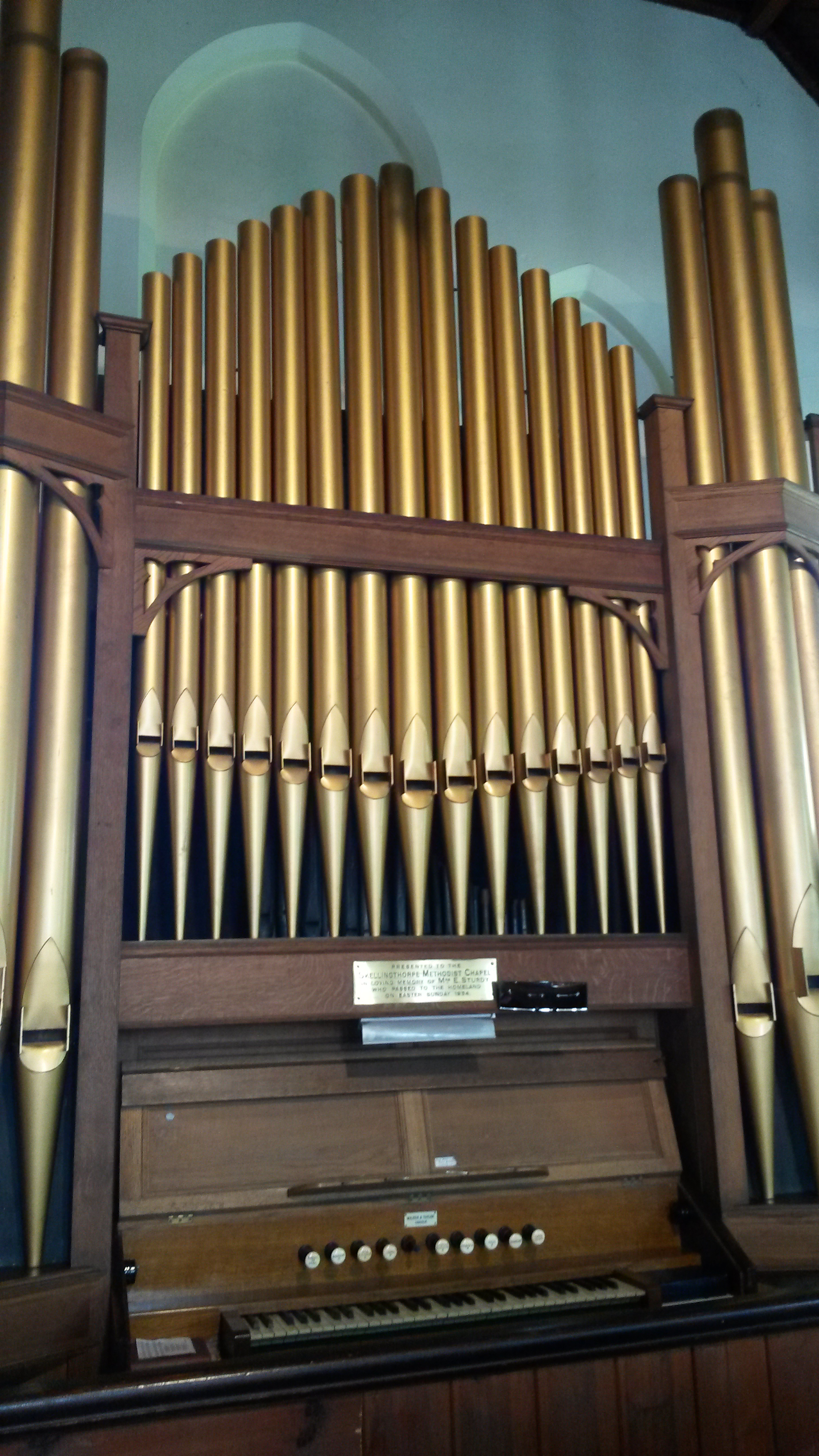
The Methodist chapel organ

Although a small number of 'Independents' – possibly Congregationalists or Baptists – had been resident in Skellingthorpe since 1796, efforts to preach Methodism in Skellingthorpe were initially unsuccessful. Richard Coupland, a farmer, granted the Methodists the Chaff House, adjoining one of his barns. The Chaff House was also used by the Independents, but in time they appear to have become absorbed into the Methodists. In 1894 the present Methodist Church was established on High Street.

=== Skellingthorpe Hall ===
Skellingthorpe Hall is to the east of the village and is a Grade II Listed Building. Pevsner describes the hall as, "A Greekly august house of the early C.19. The porch is particularly good, with pilasters at the angles and fluted Greek Doric columns in antis with a finely carved frieze behind them above the entrance'".

=== Skellingthorpe Manor ===
The Manor House is also a Grade II Listed Building, dating from around 1811, which formerly went by the name of "West Manor".

Victor William Bone (1883–1951), managing director of Ruston & Hornsby, from Ipswich, lived there. Mr Bone died aged 68 in October 1951. His son was Squadron Leader Geoffrey William Bone (1917 – May 2004), who had worked with Power Jets in Lutterworth; he installed the flight engine, in May 1941, of the Gloster E.28/39.

The Manor was previously lived in by Gervas Clifton Nevile (30 September 1883 – 20 June 1943), and previously Edward Horatio Nevile, a former Mayor of Lincoln; the wife of Gervas was Marjorie Mima Mander (1883–1968), daughter of Samuel Mander of Wolverhampton; her brothers were Liberal MP Sir Geoffrey Mander and Miles Mander.

=== Others ===
Jessup Cottage, off Lower Church Road, is believed to be the oldest house in the village, The cottage is a Grade II Listed Building and may have originated as a school. A well on the premises dates to the late 18th or early 19th century.

St Lawrence's School building was completed in 1856, supported by grants from Christ's and Spittal Hospitals.

The old vicarage off Waterloo Lane dates to 1870 and replaced an earlier one next to the church. The old village blacksmith's was in Stoney Yard. Both properties are now private residences.

Just outside the village, on Saxilby Road, is 'The Cottage', believed to be at least 400 years old and to have once been the village bake-house.

The village sign on Lincoln Road was presented to the parish by the Skellingthorpe Women's Institute in 1982 to celebrate their Diamond Jubilee. Its double-faced design reflects numerous aspects in the parish's history, from its likely Viking origins to the establishment of RAF Skellingthorpe.

== Amenities ==
Old Wood, to the west and now owned by the Woodland Trust, is an ancient woodland forming part of the Witham Valley Country Park. In the Middle Ages it was used as a deer park. It is a varied site with a mixture of ancient oak, lime woodland and conifers. To the west of the village, it merges with the smaller Old Hag Wood. One trail through the woodland is called the Odin Trail, reflecting the possible Viking origins of the village.

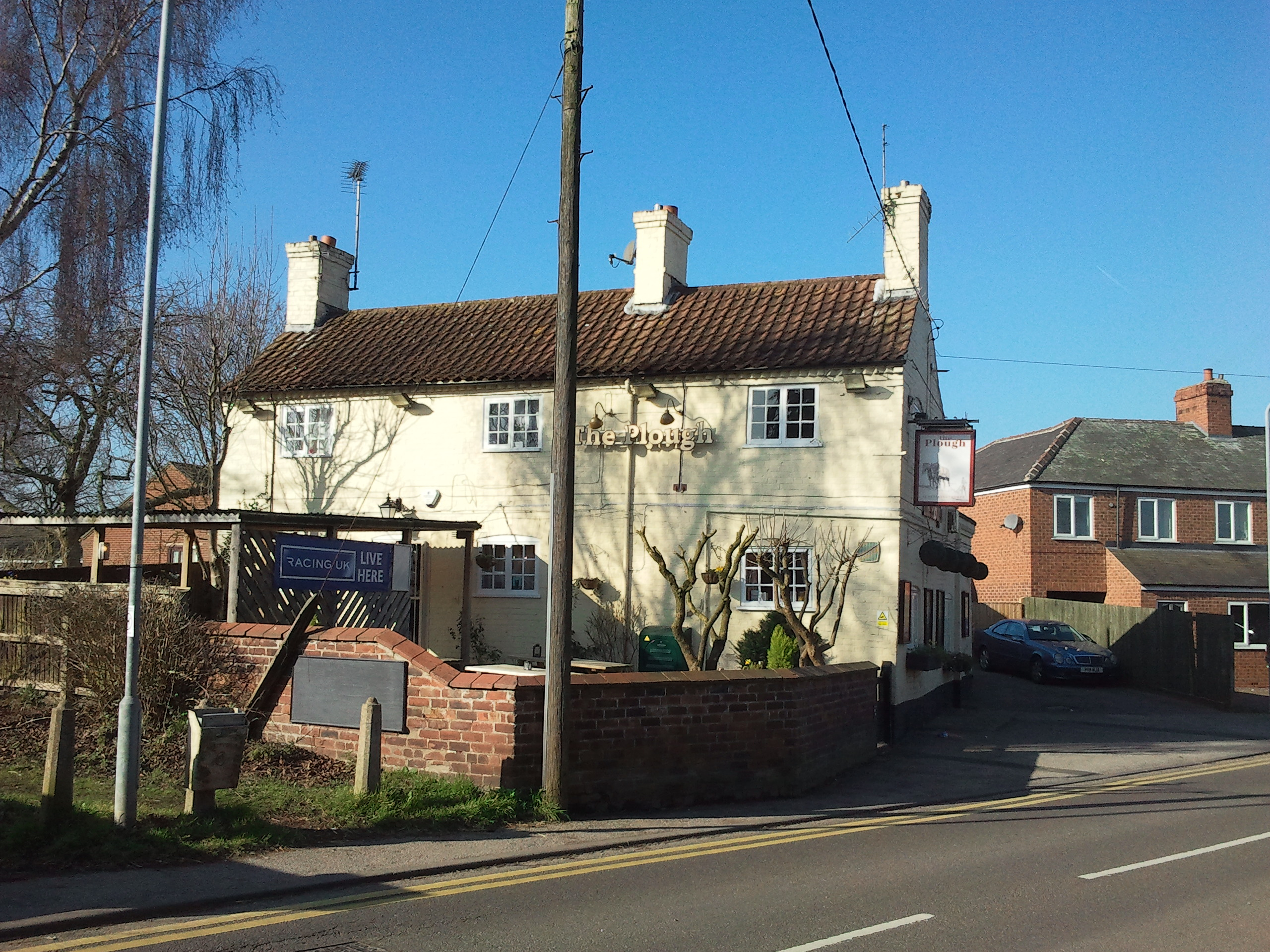
The Plough Inn on High Street

There are two village public houses: the Stone Arms and the Plough Inn, both on High Street.

The Village Hall is used by the local scouts as their HQ, and a small Heritage Room at the Community Centre houses a collection of photographs showing the development of RAF Skellingthorpe.

There are two schools: St Lawrence's Primary School and the Holt Primary School.

== Jerusalem ==
Skellingthorpe has a distinct hamlet called Jerusalem which seems to have developed in the early 1890s. Jerusalem Farm also appears to have developed around the same time. About 100 years earlier, brick-making seems to have been carried out in the area.

An early 19th-century Ordnance Survey map shows there was at one time a small Victorian-era Methodist chapel sited between two bends in the road.

== Miscellaneous ==
In 2016 it was reported that some kind of large cat-like animal might be on the prowl in Skellingthorpe, following the discovery of two mutilated hares on the lawn of a 'remote home' in the parish. The smudges of two large paw-prints, slightly smaller than an adult's hand, were also discovered on the window of an outbuilding at the same premises. Rumours of such a visitor to Skellingthorpe date back to 1997, when a large unidentified feline was allegedly sighted.

== Gallery ==
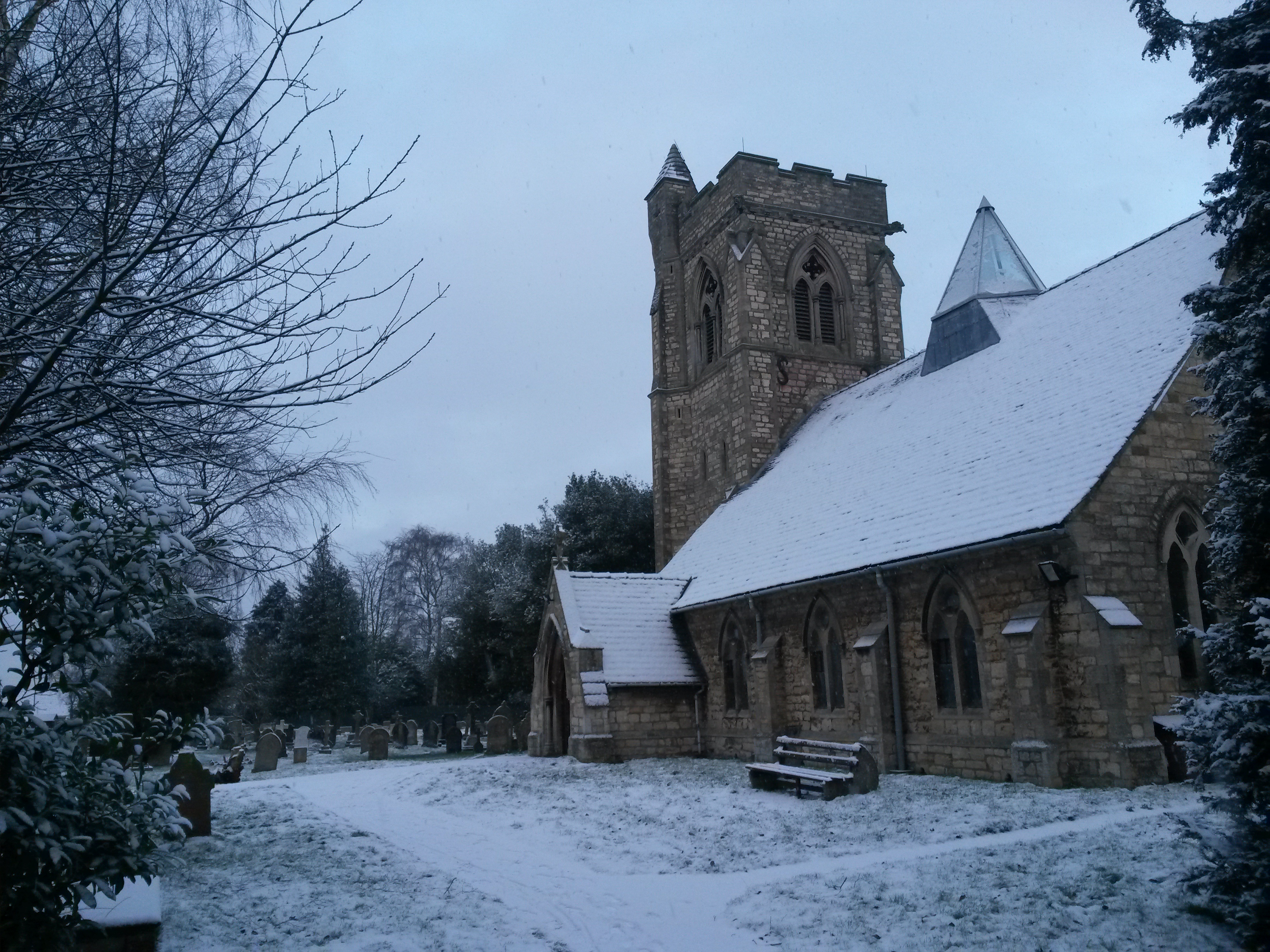
St Lawrence's Church

Skellingthorpe Hall Lodge on Lincoln Road

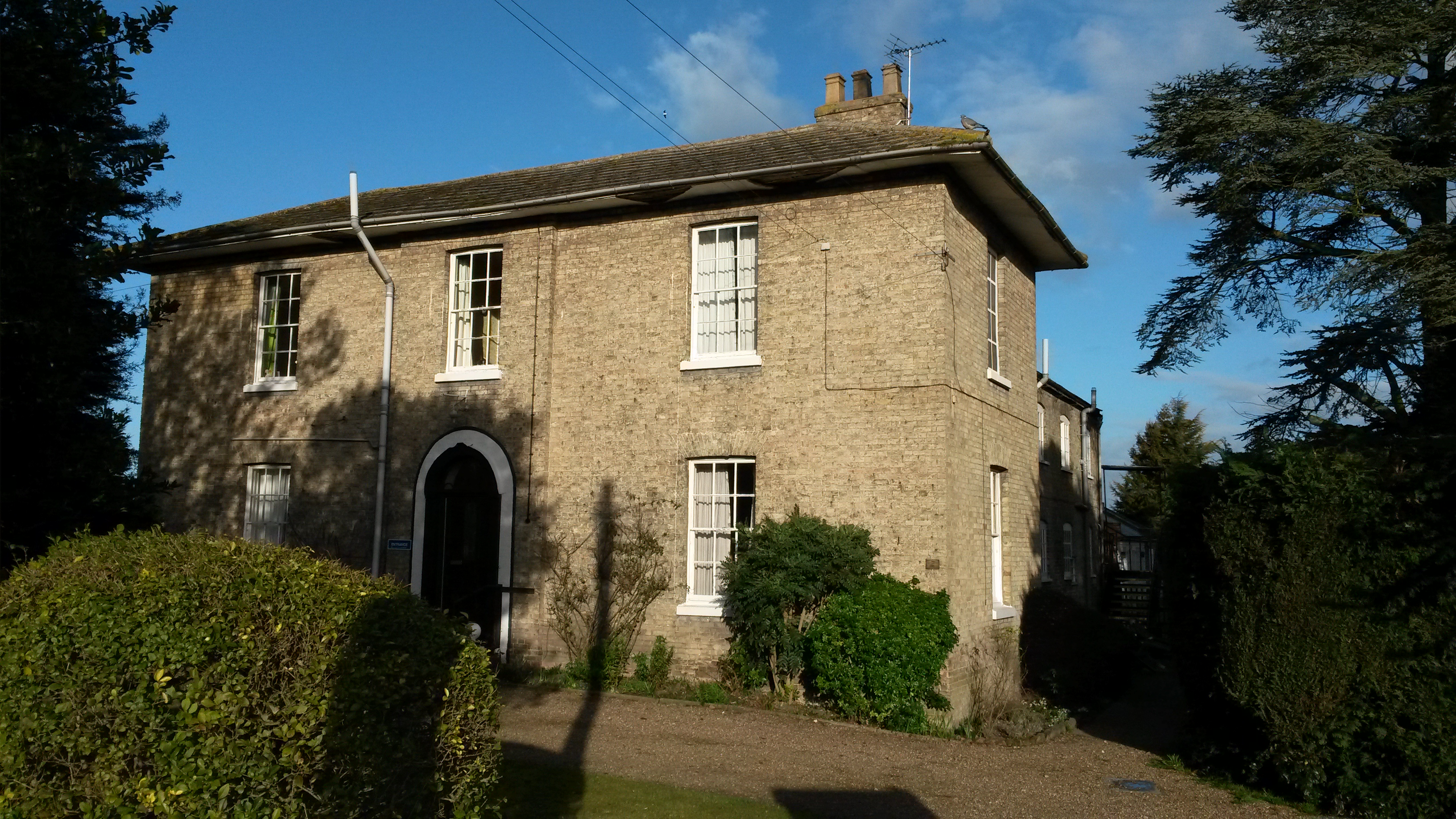
Skellingthorpe Farm, established in 1813, is now a care home

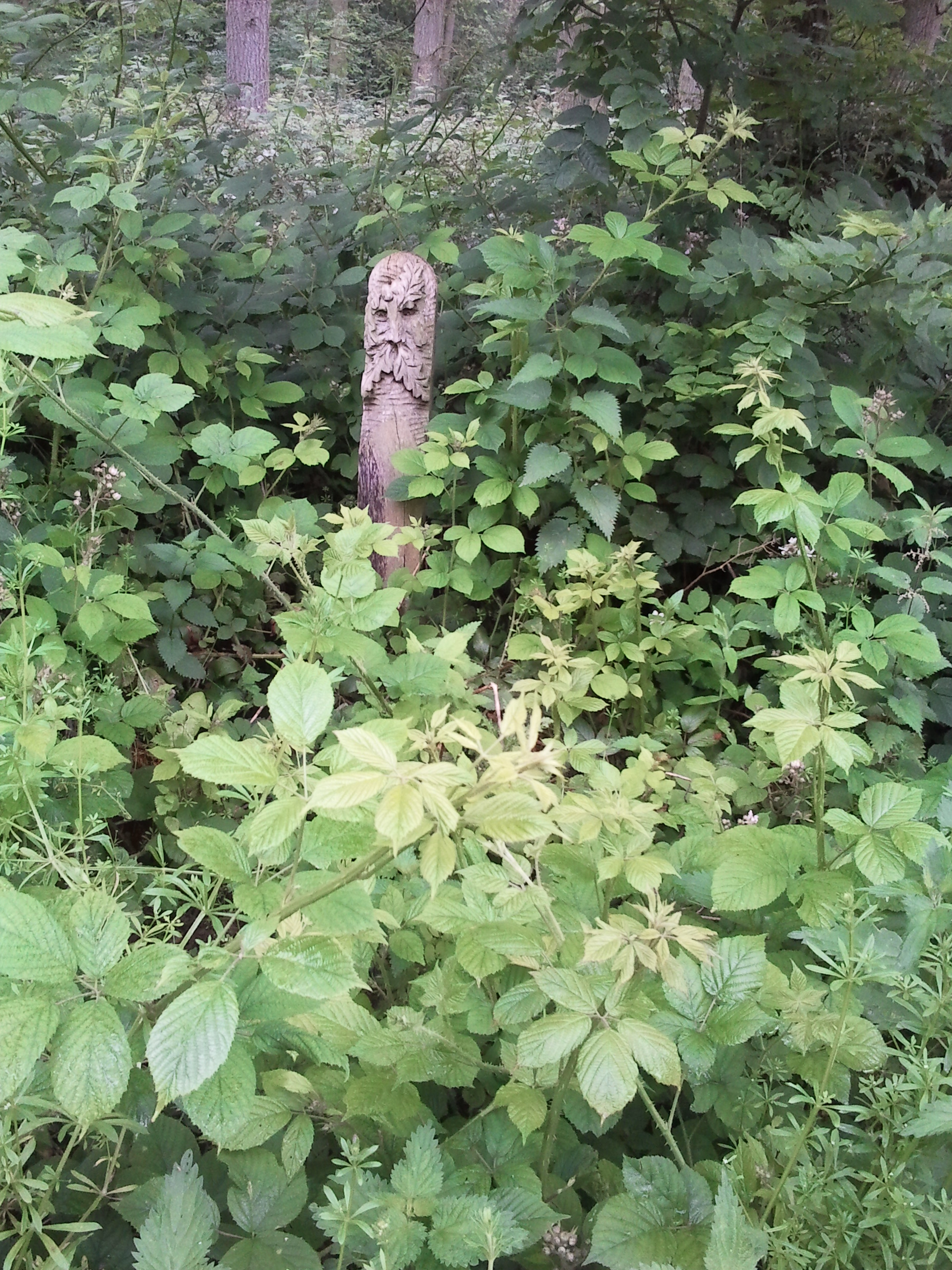
Carved markers populate Old Wood

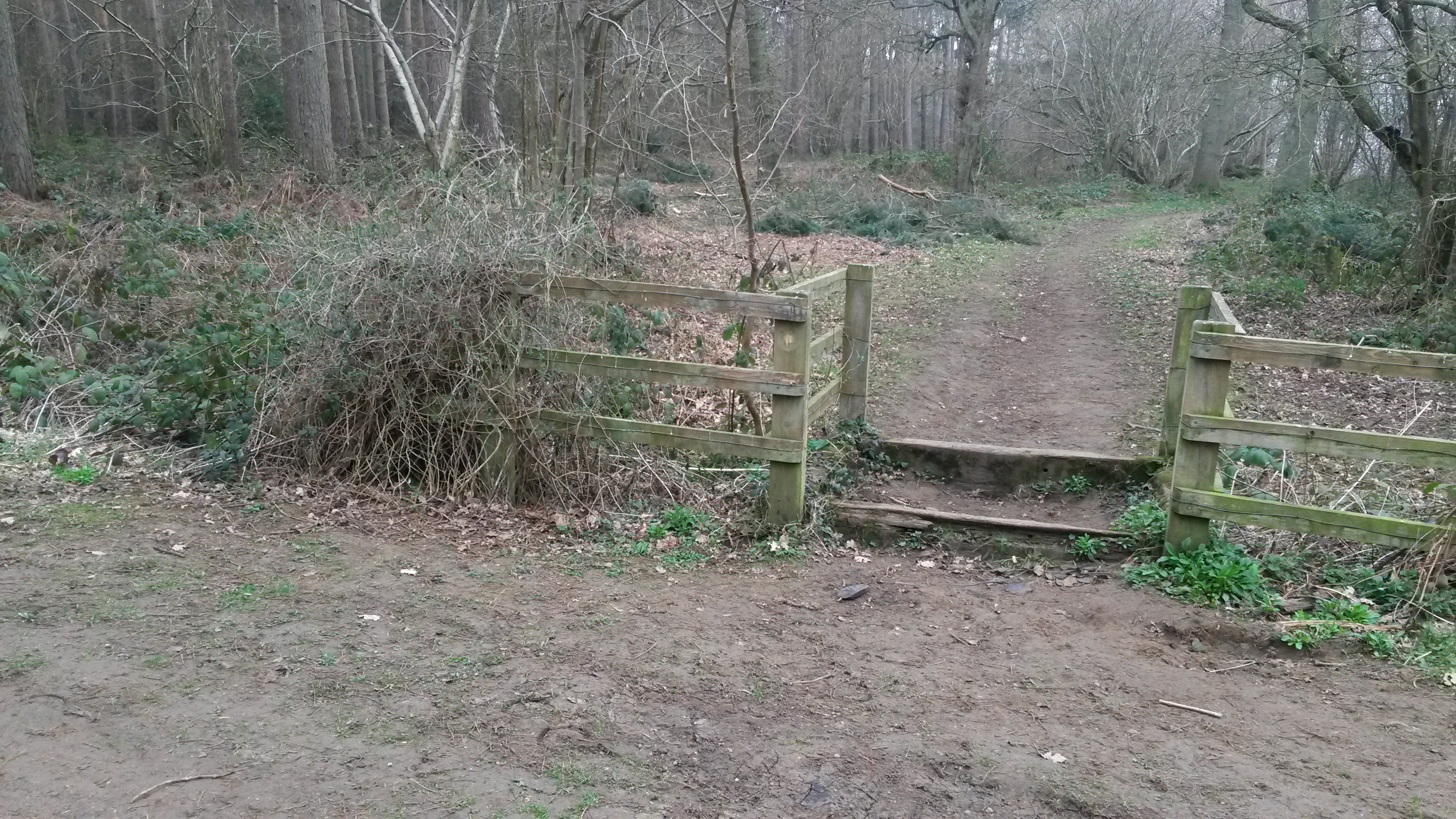
The woodland entrance at Magtree Hill

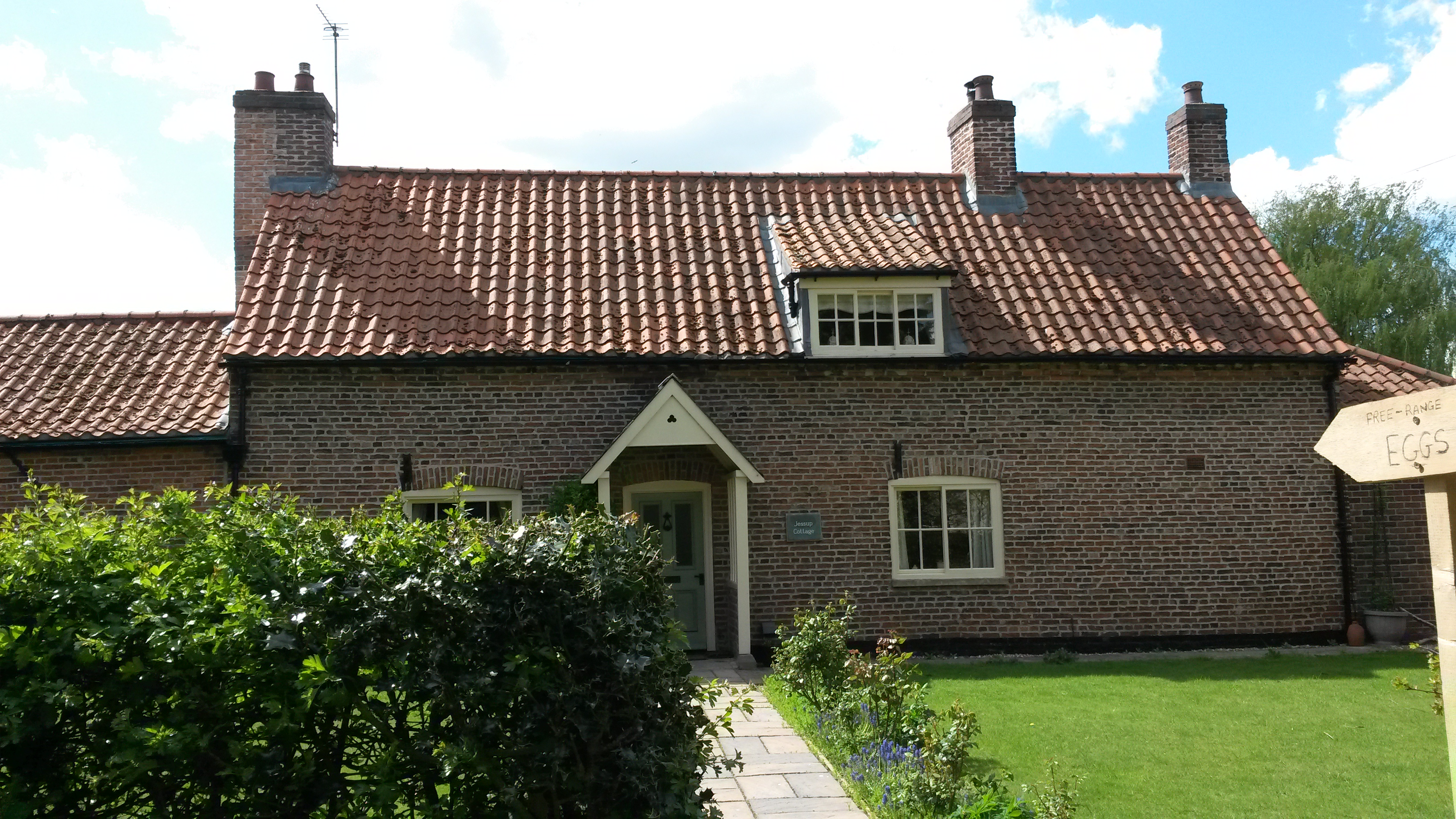
Jessup Cottage, believed to be the oldest house in Skellingthorpe

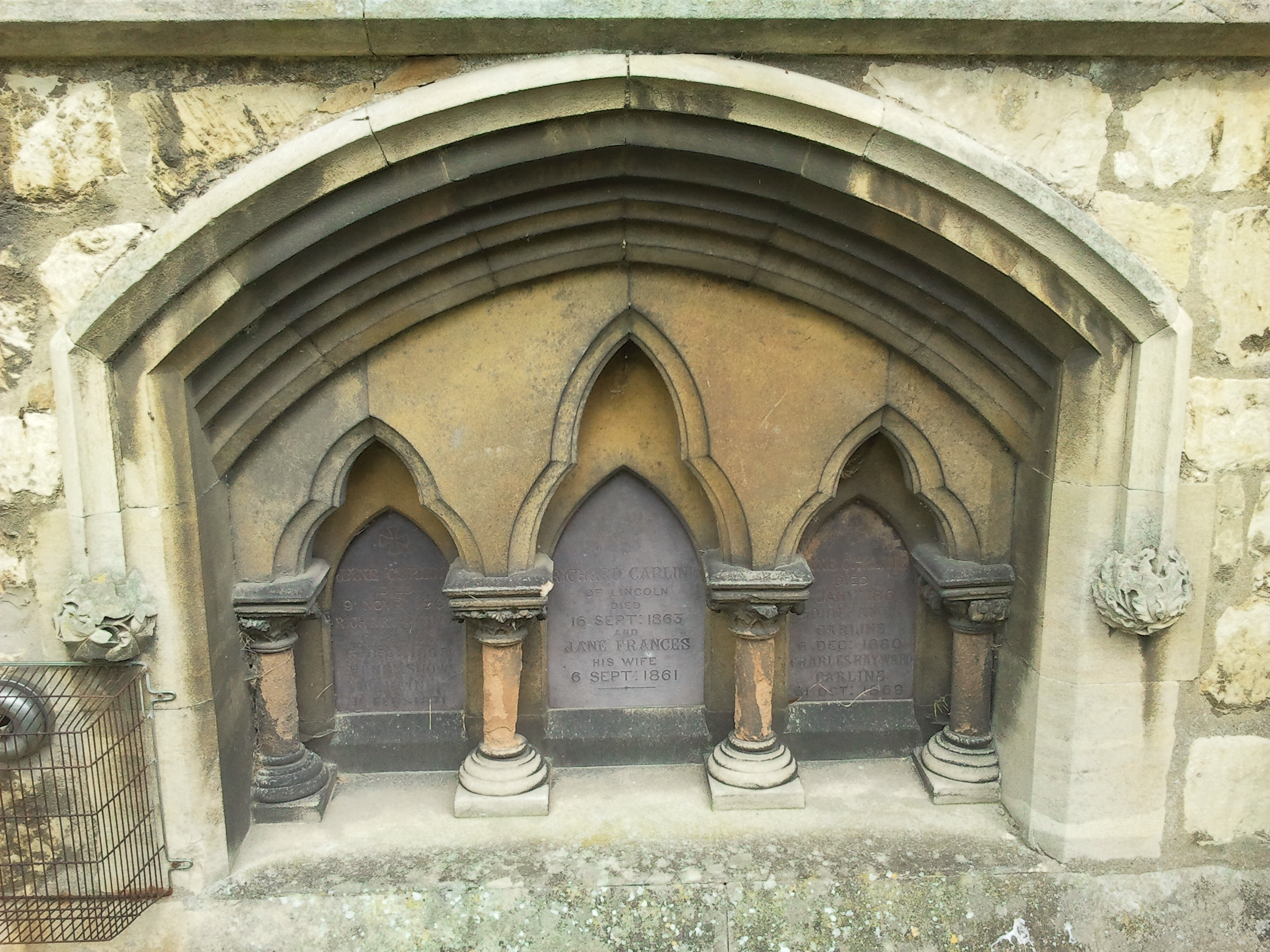
Memorial in church to mid-19th century Carline family

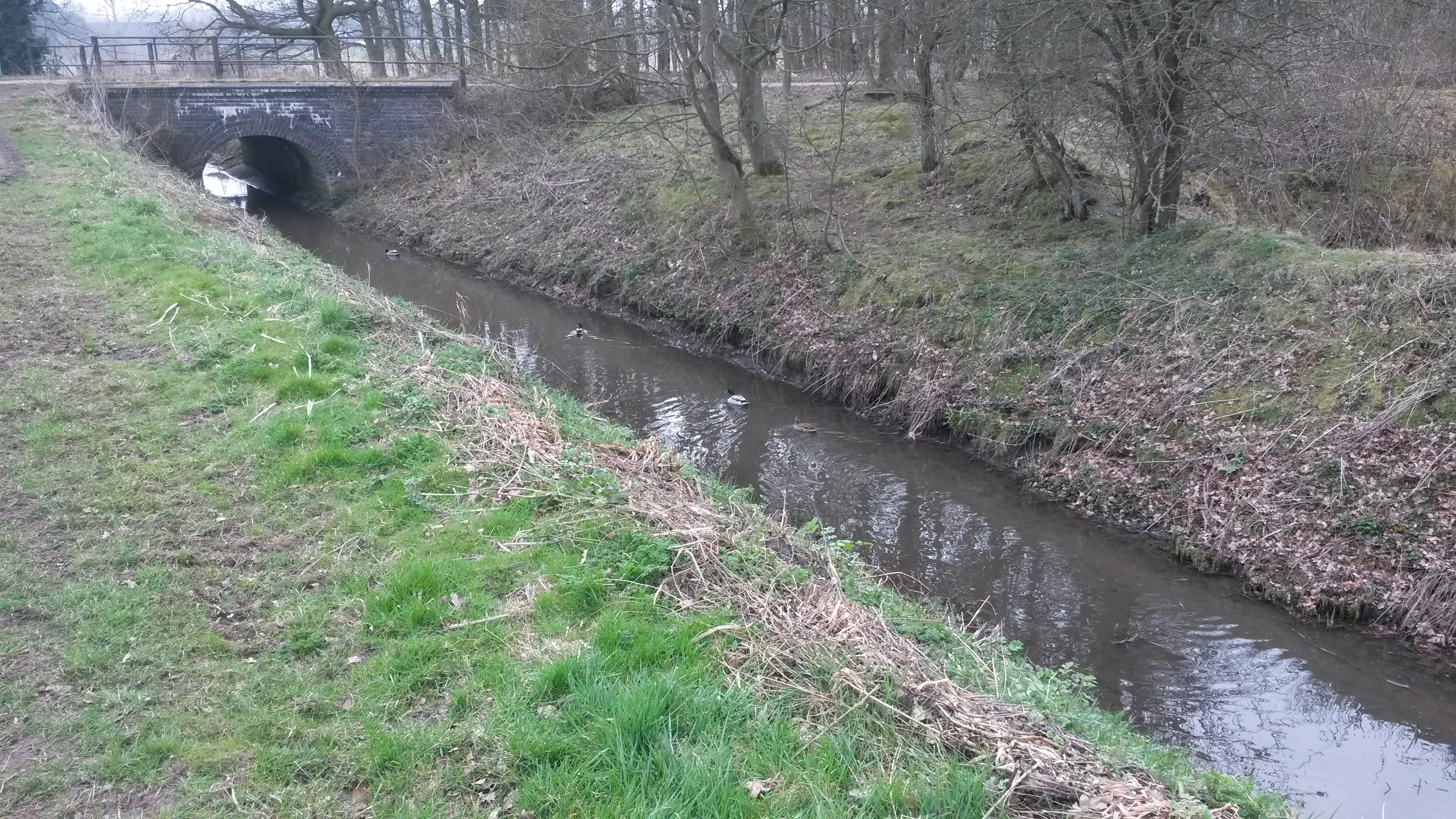
The Catchwater Drain to the east of Skellingthorpe

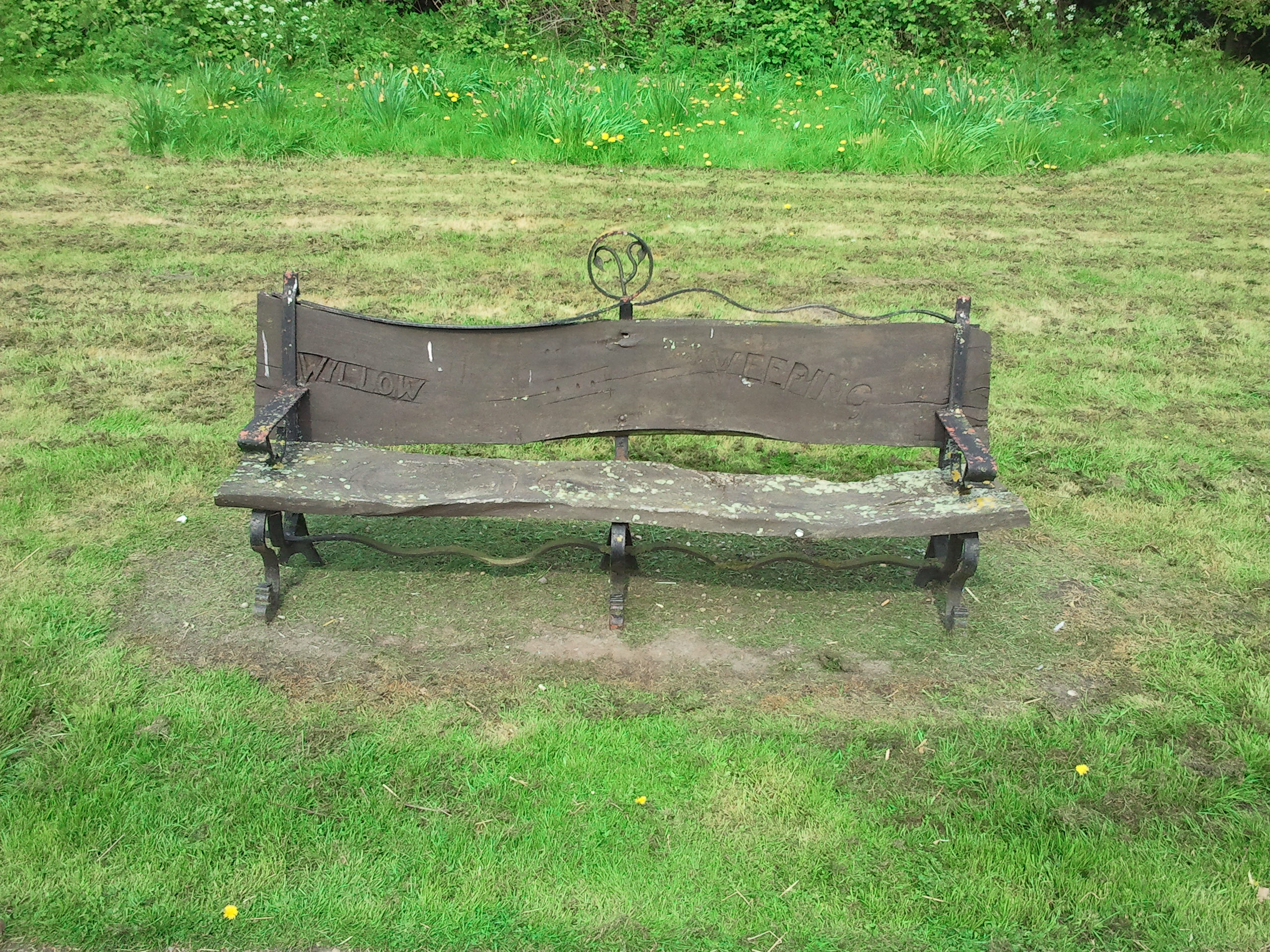
The 'Willow Weeping' bench, since dismantled

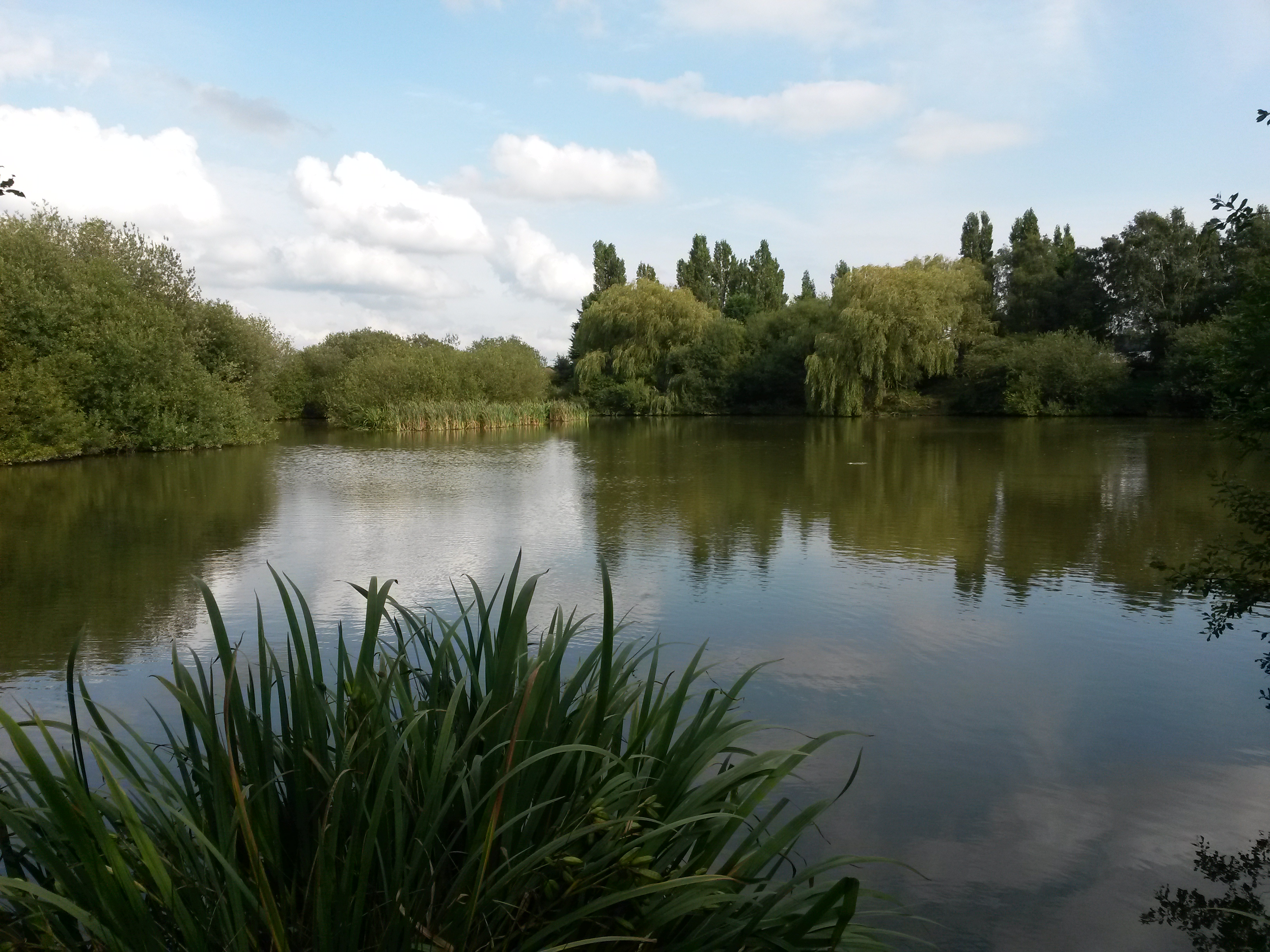
Lake at Brick Kiln Holt

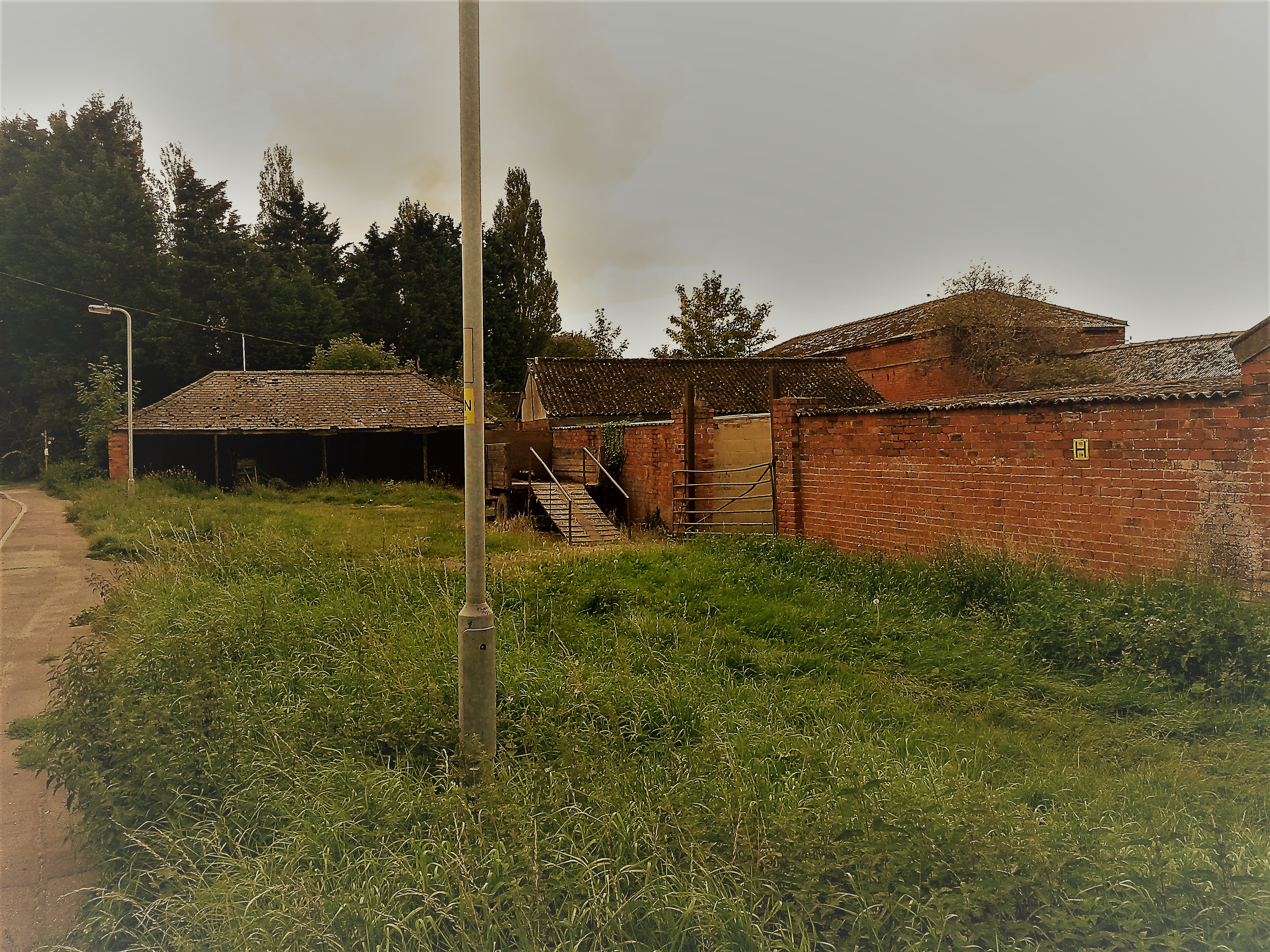
Part of Jerusalem Farm

A now-defunct railway bridge to the west of the village.

== Sources ==
- Cupit, J.; Taylor, W. (1984) [1966]. The Lancashire, Derbyshire & East Coast Railway. Oakwood Library of Railway History (2nd ed.). Headington: Oakwood Press. ISBN 978-0-85361-302-2.
- Stevens, L. (1974). Skellingthorpe: A View through History. Skellingthorpe Evening Institute.
