= Doddington and Harby railway station =

Former railway station in Nottinghamshire, England

Doddington and Harby
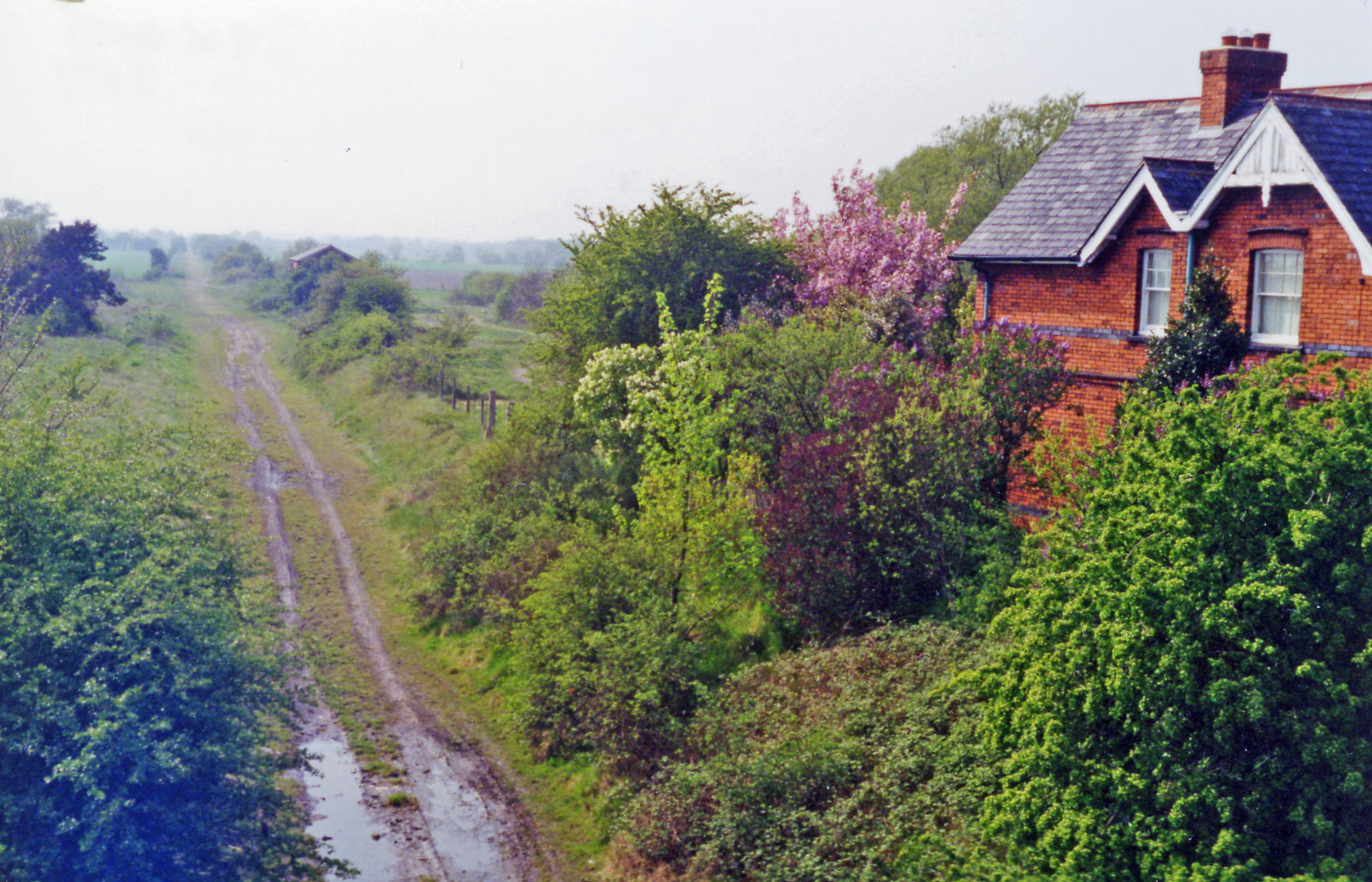
- Site of the station in 1995

General information
- Location: Nottinghamshire; England
- Coordinates: 53.2327°N 0.6830°W
- Grid reference: SK 881 714
- Platforms: 2

Other information
- Status: Disused

History
- Original company: Lancashire, Derbyshire and East Coast Railway
- Pre-grouping: Great Central Railway
- Post-grouping: London and North Eastern Railway; British Railways

Key dates
- March 1897: Opened
- 19 September 1955: Closed to passengers
- March 1964: Closed completely
Location

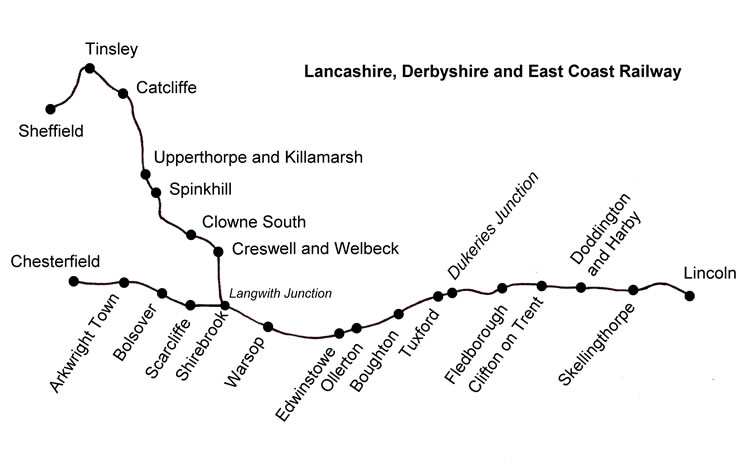
LD&ECR and Sheffield District Railway

Doddington and Harby railway station is a former railway station on the Nottinghamshire border with Lincolnshire, England.

== Context ==
The station was opened in March 1897 by the Lancashire, Derbyshire and East Coast Railway on its main line from Chesterfield to Lincoln.

The station served the rural villages of Doddington and Harby on either side of the county boundary.

It was closed to passengers by British Railways in 1955, although goods continued to be handled until 30 March 1964.

The stationmaster's house was built in the distinctive LD&ECR style, as can be seen in the accompanying photograph. The station buildings were also built in the company's style, which had clear echoes at Arkwright Town, Bolsover South and Warsop, to name but three.

== Former services ==
There never was a Sunday service at Doddington and Harby.

In 1922, three trains per day plied between Chesterfield Market Place and Lincoln, with a market day extra on Fridays between Langwith Junction and Lincoln. All these trains called at Doddington and Harby.

From 1951 trains stopped running through to Chesterfield, turning back at Langwith Junction instead. Otherwise the same pattern continued until the last train on 19 September 1955.

Trains continued to pass, including summer excursions which continued until 1964, but the picture was one of progressive decline. A derailment at Clifton-on-Trent on 21 February 1980 led to the immediate closure of the line from High Marnham Power Station through the station to Pyewipe Junction. These tracks were subsequently lifted.

== Modern times ==
Today the trackbed eastwards from the site of Fledborough Station, across Fledborough Viaduct, through Clifton-on-Trent to Doddington and Harby forms an off-road part of National Cycle Route 647 which is part of the National Cycle Network.

From Doddington and Harby onwards through the site of Skellingthorpe almost to Pyewipe Junction the trackbed forms an off-road part of National Cycle Route 64.

Preceding station	Disused railways	Following station
Clifton-on-Trent; Line and station closed	Great Central Railway; Lancashire, Derbyshire and East Coast Railway	Skellingthorpe; Line and station closed
