= Birchwood, Lincoln =

Suburb of Lincoln, Lincolnshire, England

Coordinates: 53.214748°N 0.603583°W

Birchwood
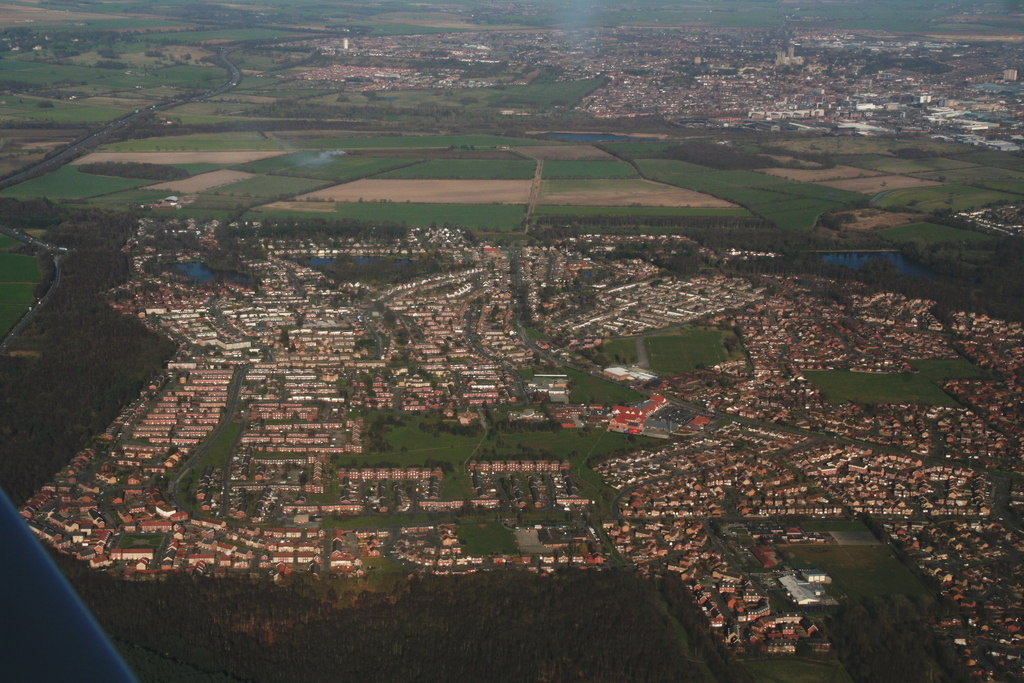
- Aerial of Birchwood

- Location within Lincolnshire
- Population: 8,932 (2021)
- District: City of Lincoln
- Shire county: Lincolnshire
- Region: East Midlands
- Country: England
- Sovereign state: United Kingdom
- Post town: LINCOLN
- Postcode district: LN6
- Dialling code: 01522
- Police: Lincolnshire
- Fire: Lincolnshire
- Ambulance: East Midlands
- UK Parliament: Lincoln

Birchwood is a suburb to the southwest of Lincoln in Lincolnshire, England. The district population in the 2021 Census was 8,932. It is located midway between Skellingthorpe and Boultham. Birchwood and Doddington Park are built on the site of the Second World War airfield RAF Skellingthorpe which had hosted No. 50 Squadron and No. 61 Squadron. Contrary to popular opinion Doddington Park is part of the Birchwood estate as proved by its Birchwood post code.

== Amenities and community ==
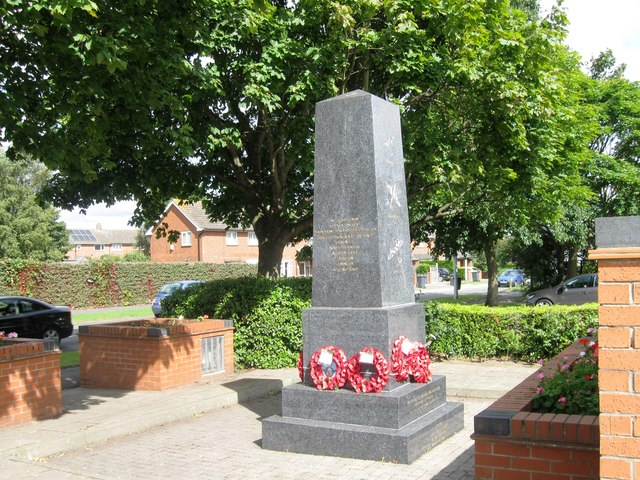
Birchwood War Memorial

The estate has a number of schools, including St Hughes Catholic Primary School and Leslie Manser Primary School, named after World War II bomber pilot Leslie Manser. This school has a small museum dedicated to finds found on the site when it was excavated, including the wing of a Spitfire. There is also Birchwood Junior School along with a special education school called Fortuna. There are also several nursery and pre-junior schools.

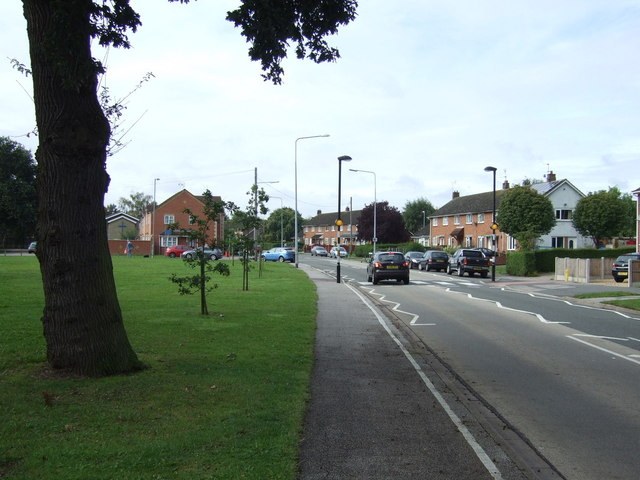
Birchwood Avenue, Birchwood

The Birchwood shopping centre, in the middle of the estate was refurbished by the Lincolnshire Co-operative, who own the centre, in 2011. It houses a variety of amenities, as well as further residential space and a children's centre.

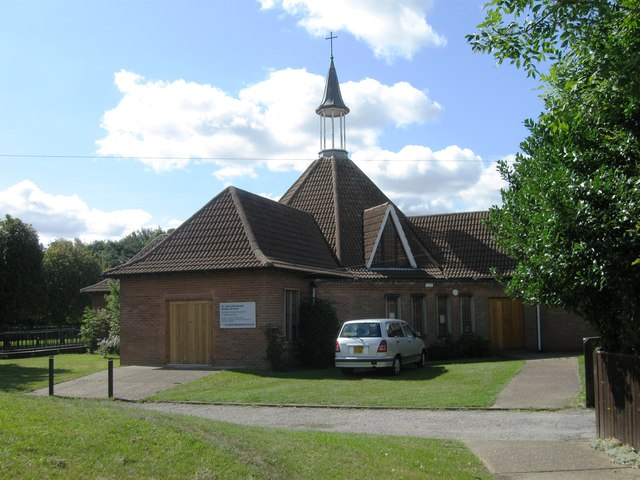
St Luke's Church, Birchwood

The church of St Luke and St Martin in Jasmin Road was designed in 1976 by Robert Read of Grantham; its ecclesiastical parish is Lincoln Birchwood St Luke. It is fully accessible for wheelchair users. The Catholic Parish of St Peter & St Paul is in nearby Skellingthorpe Road and the parish oversees St Hugh's Primary School. "The Boiler House" community centre provides for a range of groups and activities.

== Lincoln Western Growth Corridor ==
Birchwood is currently seeing a major northern expansion over the north of Skellingthorpe Road which will form part of the Lincoln Western Growth Corridor scheme and will see up to 3,200 new homes and a new district being built on green fields to the north of Birchwood. Works are currently underway but have been met with much disruption, opposition and issues relating to traffic congestion.

== Demographics ==
Birchwood had a population of 8,932 residents at the 2021 Census. The ethnicity makeup of the district at the census was 95% White, followed by 2% Asian, 1% Black, 1% Mixed Race, 1% Other Ethnicity and less than 1% Arab. This makes the district, 95% White and 5% Ethnic minorities. The religious makeup of the district was 50% Irreligious, followed by 48% Christian, 1% Muslim, 1% Other religion and less than 1% Hindu. Making the district 50% irreligious and 50% religious. The median age of the district was primarily 18–64 years old followed by 0–17 years old and 65+ years old. Most of the residents were born in the UK, with around 7,988 UK born, followed by 657 from EU countries and 140 from Middle East and Asia countries. The gender split for the district was 4,610 Women and 4,324 Males. There are a number of churches in the district and the nearest mosque is in the Boultham area of Lincoln.

== Transport ==
Birchwood has regular bus services to Lincoln, Skellingthorpe and Anwick. The nearest railway stations are Lincoln, Saxilby and Hykeham. The former Lancashire, Derbyshire and East Coast Railway passed by the district with a station at Skellingthorpe but this closed in the 1950s. The trackbed now forms a footpath between Skellingthorpe and Fledborough in Nottinghamshire.
