= Skellingthorpe railway station (Lancashire, Derbyshire and East Coast Railway) =

Former railway station in Skellingthorpe, Lincolnshire, England

Skellingthorpe
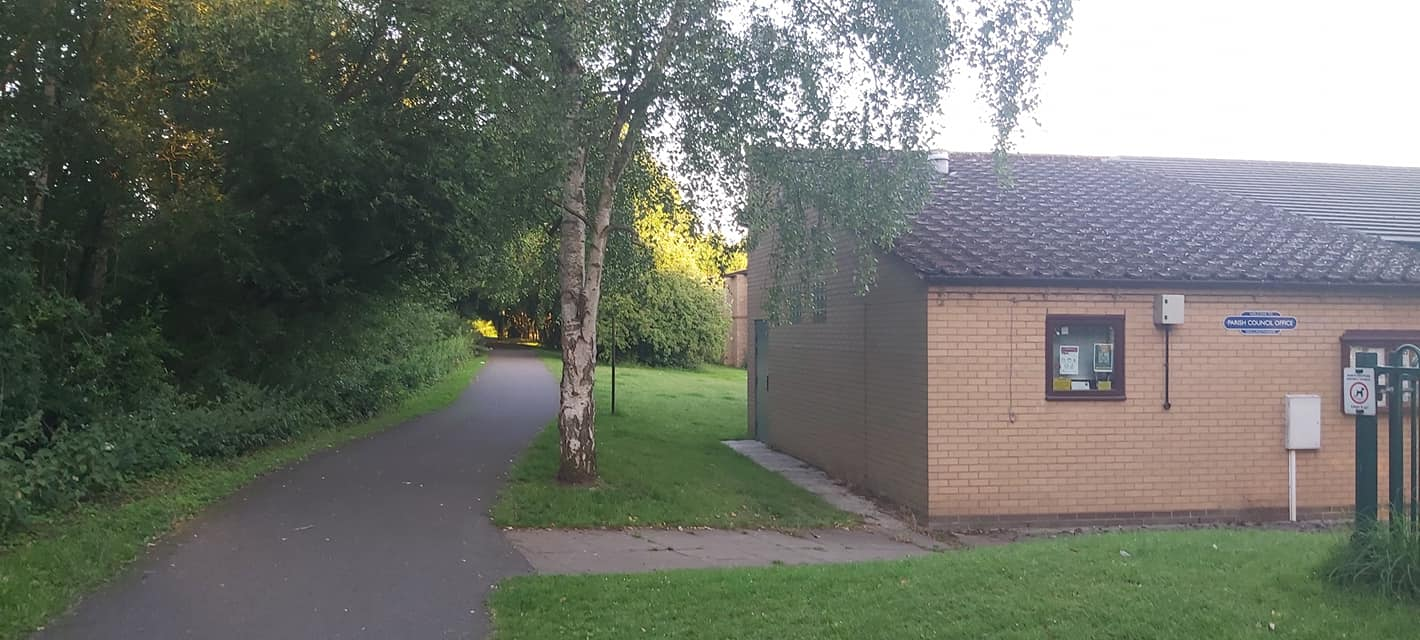

General information
- Location: Skellingthorpe, Lincolnshire; England
- Coordinates: 53°14′1.44″N 0°36′47.12″W
- Grid reference: SK 926 716
- Platforms: 2

Other information
- Status: Disused

History
- Original company: LD&ECR
- Pre-grouping: Great Central Railway
- Post-grouping: LNER; British Railways

Key dates
- 1865: GNR station
- 1868: GNR station closed
- March 1897: LD&ECR station opened
- 19 September 1955: Closed for passengers
- 30 March 1964: closed for freight
Location

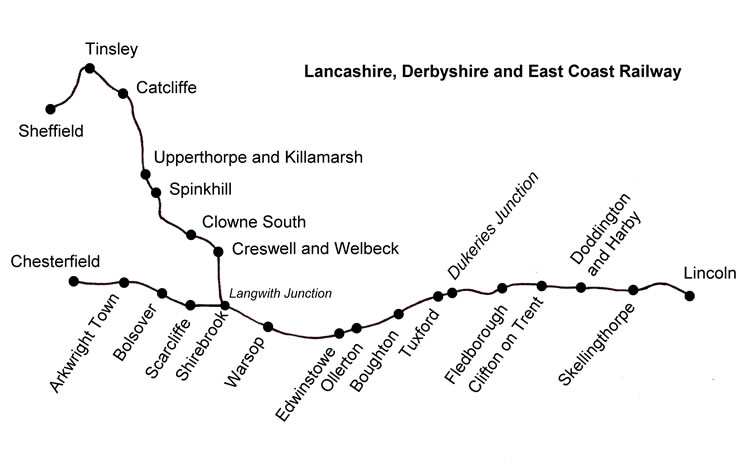
LD&ECR and Sheffield District Railway

Skellingthorpe (Lancashire, Derbyshire and East Coast Railway) railway station is one of two former railway stations in Skellingthorpe, Lincolnshire, England. It replaced the former station on the GNR.

== Context ==
An earlier station to serve the village had been opened by the Great Northern Railway on the line between Lincoln and Gainsborough, situated at the end of Ferry Lane. It opened in 1865 and closed in 1868, although the line is still operational today.

This second station was opened in March 1897 by the Lancashire, Derbyshire and East Coast Railway on its main line from Chesterfield to Lincoln. It was closed by British Railways in 1955, though freight and passenger trains continued to pass through for some years after that.

Skellingthorpe was the only LD&ECR station in Lincolnshire, since to the east the line joined the GN&GE Joint line at Pyewipe Junction onto GNR metals into Lincoln while to the west the line crossed the Nottinghamshire border before the next station at Harby. Only two LD&ECR stations had a level crossing, Skellingthorpe and Bolsover South.

The station building stood to the north of the tracks. It was built in the LD&ECR's standard modular style.

== Former services ==
There never was a Sunday service at Skellingthorpe.

In 1922 three trains per day plied between Chesterfield Market Place and Lincoln with a market day extra on Fridays between Langwith Junction and Lincoln. All these trains called at Skellingthorpe.

From 1951 trains stopped running through to Chesterfield, turning back at Langwith Junction instead. Otherwise the same pattern continued until the last train on 19 September 1955.

Trains continued to pass, including Summer excursions which continued until 1964, but the picture was of progressive decline. A derailment at Clifton-on-Trent on 21 February 1980 led to the immediate closure of the line from High Marnham Power Station through the station to Pyewipe Junction. These tracks were subsequently lifted.

== Modern times ==
Today the trackbed eastwards from the site of Fledborough Station, across Fledborough Viaduct, through Clifton-on-Trent to Doddington and Harby forms an off-road part of National Cycle Route 647 which is part of the National Cycle Network.

From the site of Doddington and Harby onwards through the site of Skellingthorpe station almost to Pyewipe Junction the trackbed forms an off-road part of National Cycle Route 64.

Preceding station	Disused railways	Following station
Doddington and Harby; Line and station closed	Great Central Railway; Lancashire, Derbyshire and East Coast Railway	Lincoln Central; Line closed, station open
