= Jerusalem, Lincolnshire =

Small ribbon development in the North Kesteven district of Lincolnshire, England

Coordinates: 53.226192°N 0.625739°W

Jerusalem
- Location within Lincolnshire
- OS grid reference: SK918707
  - London: 120 mi (190 km) S
- District: North Kesteven
- Shire county: Lincolnshire
- Region: East Midlands
- Country: England
- Sovereign state: United Kingdom
- Post town: LINCOLN
- Postcode district: LN6
- Police: Lincolnshire
- Fire: Lincolnshire
- Ambulance: East Midlands

Jerusalem is a small ribbon development in the North Kesteven district of Lincolnshire, England. It conjoined to the south of Skellingthorpe, and is part of Skellingthorpe civil parish.

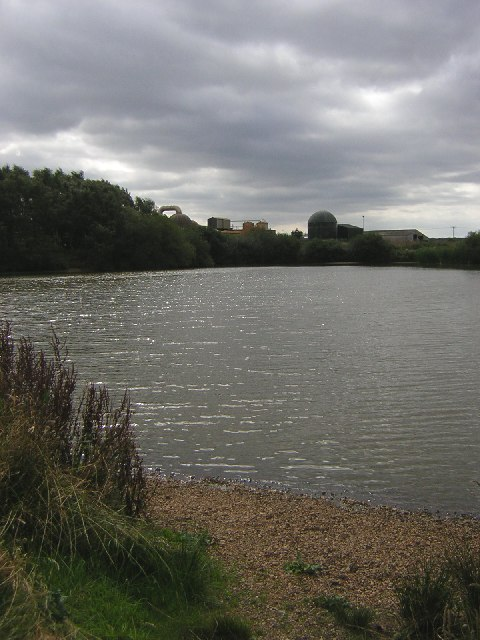
Pond at Jerusalem

One of the earliest references to Jerusalem was found in documents dating back to 1436. Simon Sebag Montefiore states that the village dates back to this period, when 'pilgrimage to Jerusalem' was "wildly popular" but travelling to the city of Jerusalem was either not a practical proposition or it was too hostile a location.
