= RAF Skellingthorpe =

Former RAF station in Lincolnshire, England

RAF Skellingthorpe
- Lincoln, Lincolnshire in England

Site information
- Owner: Air Ministry
- Operator: Royal Air Force
- Controlled by: RAF Bomber Command

Location
- Shown within Lincolnshire
- Coordinates: 53.214°N 0.603°W

Site history
- Built: 1941
- In use: 1941-1952

Royal Air Force Skellingthorpe or more simply RAF Skellingthorpe is a former Royal Air Force station which was operational during the Second World War. It was located just west of the city of Lincoln, England about 2.5 miles (4 km) south-east of the village of Skellingthorpe on a field previously called Black Moor. After its closure the site was developed as the Birchwood estate.

== History ==
The airfield opened in 1941 under the control of RAF Bomber Command and consisted of the standard pattern of three runways, with one Type B1 and two Type T2 hangars. Nissen huts were used for accommodation. It was known as "Skelly" by the RAF personnel serving there.

No. 50 Squadron RAF, equipped with Handley Page Hampdens, was the first squadron based at Skellingthorpe, with the first detachment of personnel arriving shortly before the runways were complete. They were followed by No. 455 Squadron RAAF (also flying Hampdens), however this squadron moved to RAF Wigsley shortly afterwards.

The 50 Squadron Hampdens were replaced with Avro Manchesters in April 1942, then, in June 1942, Skellingthorpe was closed for runway extensions to cope with the Squadron's conversion to new Avro Lancaster aircraft.

In November 1943 a further bomber squadron, No. 61 Squadron RAF operating Avro Lancasters, arrived at Skellingthorpe, and remained until February 1944 after which it transferred to RAF Coningsby in order for accommodation to be built on the Doddington Road side of Skellingthorpe airfield.

463 Squadron RAAF moved to RAF Skellingthorpe on 3 July 1945 with Lancaster Mks I and III from RAF Waddington.

During the war the tally of bombers lost or failed to return from Skellingthorpe reached 208: 15 Hampdens, six Manchesters and 187 Lancasters. In 1981, former Chief of the Air Staff, Marshal of the Royal Air Force Sir Michael Beetham, who had flown Lancasters from Skellingthorpe during the war, unveiled a memorial on the site to commemorate the 1,984 men killed flying from the airfield during the Second World War.

=== Postwar ===
After the end of the Second World War, RAF Skellingthorpe was the base for No. 58 Maintenance Unit RAF, with salvaged crashed aircraft stored at the base.

== Units ==
The following units were also here at some point:

- No. 3 (Coastal) Operational Training Unit RAF
- No. 14 (Pilots) Advanced Flying Unit RAF
- No. 50 Conversion Flight RAF
- No. 92 Maintenance Unit RAF
- No. 93 Maintenance Unit RAF
- No. 97 Conversion Flight RAF
- No. 383 Maintenance Unit RAF
- No. 1485 (Bomber) Gunnery Flight RAF
- No. 1506 (Beam Approach Training) Flight RAF

== Current use ==
The Birchwood Estate was built on the airfield in the 1970s, and the A46 Lincoln Bypass was built on it in 1986.

The local public house, The Black Swan, was named after the R/T call sign of the airfield.

=== Exhibition and museum ===
A Heritage Room at the Community Centre in Skellingthorpe holds a public exhibition of photographs showing the history of RAF Skellingthorpe and Squadrons based there, and is part of the North Kesteven Airfield Trail.

A small public museum, part of Birchwood Community Centre in Lincoln, commemorates Nos. 50 and 61 Squadrons. Included in the museum is squadron aircraft memorabilia, photographs and records. The 50 and 61 Squadron Books of Remembrance are also held there.
