= Clifton-on-Trent railway station =

Former railway station in Nottinghamshire, England

Clifton-on-Trent
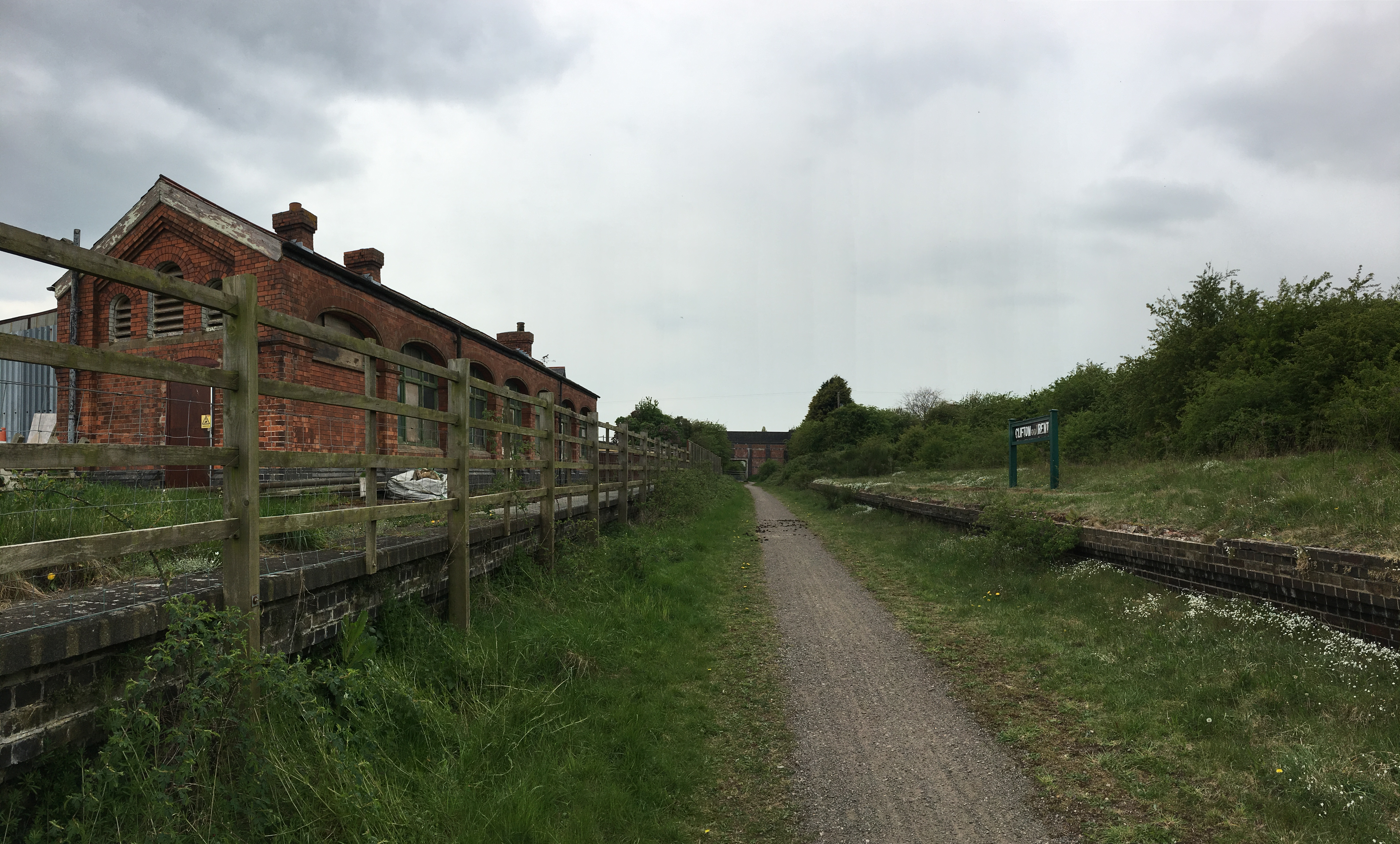
- Site of the former station in 2017

General information
- Location: Nottinghamshire; England
- Coordinates: 53°14′2.08″N 0°45′34.91″W
- Grid reference: SK 8288 7148
- Platforms: 2

Other information
- Status: Disused

History
- Original company: Lancashire, Derbyshire and East Coast Railway
- Pre-grouping: Great Central Railway
- Post-grouping: London and North Eastern Railway; British Railways

Key dates
- 15 December 1896: Opened
- 19 September 1955: Closed for passengers
- 30 March 1964: closed for freight
Location

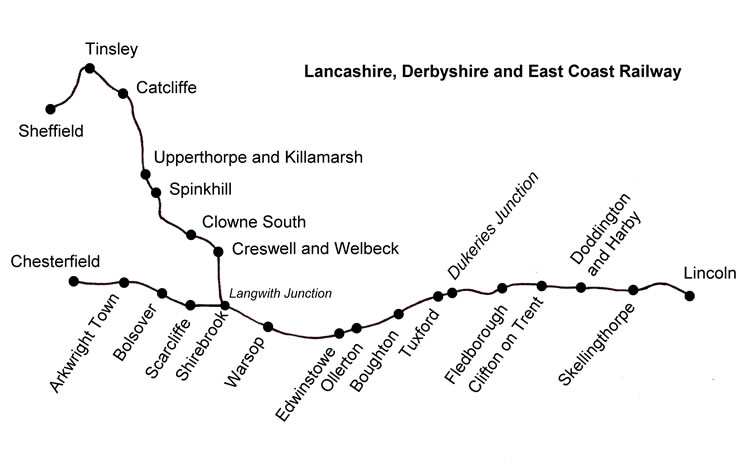
LD&ECR and Sheffield District Railway

Clifton-on-Trent railway station is a former railway station between North Clifton and South Clifton in eastern Nottinghamshire, England.

== Context ==
The station was opened in 1896 by the Lancashire, Derbyshire and East Coast Railway on its main line from Chesterfield to Lincoln. It was closed by British Railways in 1955.

The station was at the eastern end of Fledborough Viaduct, which crosses the River Trent. It was a short walk to the river and was popular with anglers.

The station buildings and Stationmaster's house were all built in the company's distinctive architectural style, which had clear echoes at Arkwright Town, Bolsover South and Warsop, to name but three.

== Former services ==
There never was a Sunday service at Clifton-on-Trent.

In 1922 three trains per day plied between Chesterfield Market Place and Lincoln with a market day extra on Fridays between Shirebrook North and Lincoln. All these trains called at Clifton.

From 1951 trains stopped running through to Chesterfield, turning back at Shirebrook North instead. Otherwise the same pattern continued until the last train on 17 September 1955.

Trains continued to pass, including Summer excursions which continued until 1964, but the picture was of progressive decline. A derailment at Clifton itself on 21 February 1980 led to the immediate closure of the line from High Marnham Power Station through the station to Pyewipe Junction. These tracks were subsequently lifted.

== Modern times ==
Today the trackbed eastwards from the site of Fledborough Station, across Fledborough Viaduct, through Clifton to Doddington & Harby forms an off-road part of National Cycle Route 647 which is part of the National Cycle Network.

From Harby onwards through the site of Skellingthorpe almost to Pyewipe Junction the trackbed forms an off-road part of National Cycle Route 64.

Preceding station	Disused railways	Following station
Fledborough; Line and station closed	Great Central Railway; Lancashire, Derbyshire and East Coast Railway	Doddington and Harby; Line and station closed
