= Fledborough Viaduct =

Viaduct in the United Kingdom

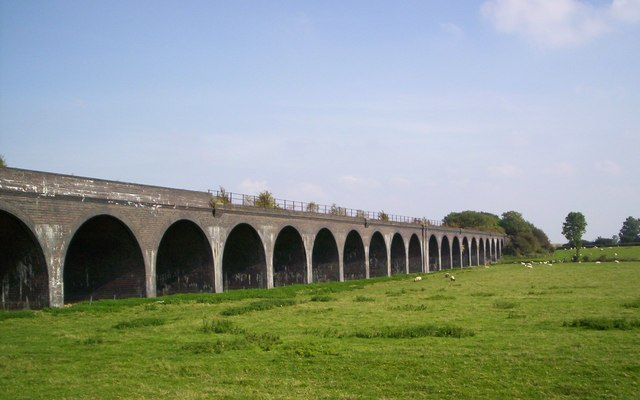
- Fledborough Viaduct in 2008
- Coordinates: 53°14′7.0″N 0°46′43.5″W
- Carries: Ex-Lancashire, Derbyshire and East Coast Railway
- Crosses: River Trent
- Locale: Fledborough / North Clifton, Nottinghamshire
- Maintained by: Sustrans

Characteristics
- Design: 59 brick arches; 4 trussed steel girder spans
- Total length: 814 metres (890 yd)
- Width: Twin Standard Gauge Rail

History
- Designer: Robert Elliott-Cooper
- Opened: 1897
- Closed: 21 February 1980

Location
- Interactive map of Fledborough Viaduct

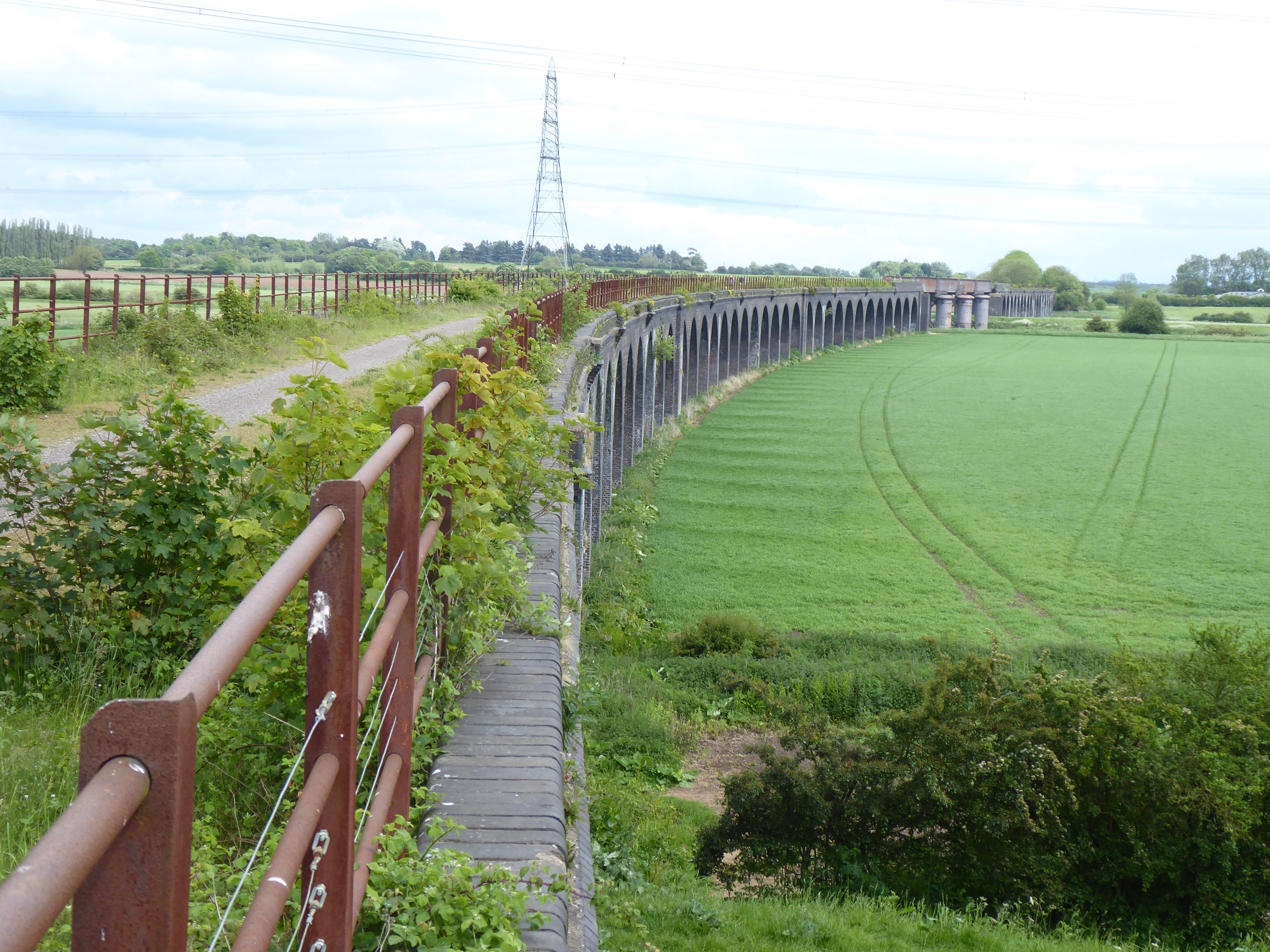
The former rail line is now part of National Cycle Route 647 which takes cyclists over the river Trent

Fledborough Viaduct is a former railway viaduct near Fledborough, Nottinghamshire which is now part of the national cycle network.

== History ==
The viaduct is a substantial structure which carried the double-track LD&ECR's Chesterfield Market Place to Lincoln Central main line over the River Trent.

It is situated between the former stations of Fledborough and Clifton-on-Trent, but nearer the latter.

Opened in 1897, it consists of 59 arches spread either side of four metal girder spans which cross the river itself. Nine million bricks were used in its construction which cost £65,000.

Timetabled passenger services over the viaduct ended in September 1955, though summer weekend excursions from Nottinghamshire and Derbyshire to Cleethorpes and Mablethorpe and from Manchester Central to Yarmouth Vauxhall continued until 1964.

From the 1960s traffic east of Langwith Junction was overwhelmingly coal, much of which went straight from collieries to High Marnham Power Station which opened in 1959, this traffic therefore turned off about half a mile before the viaduct. The Grimsby to Whitland express fish train ran until at least 1962 via Fledborough and through Mansfield Central.

The four original steel truss spans over the River Trent were replaced with steel plate girder spans of single track width in 1965. These were positioned within the existing spans before the old spans were removed.

Traffic continued to run over the viaduct until 21 February 1980 when a goods train derailed at Clifton-on-Trent seriously damaging the track. Reinstatement was deemed uneconomic and the line from Pyewipe Junction over the viaduct as far as High Marnham was closed and ultimately lifted.

Coal traffic continued from the west to High Marnham power station until this closed in 2003. Since 2009 that stretch of line has become Network Rail's High Marnham Test Track.

== Modern times ==
Today the railway trackbed eastwards from the site of Fledborough station, across the viaduct, through Clifton to Doddington & Harby forms an off-road part of National Cycle Route 647 which is part of the National Cycle Network.

From Harby onwards through the site of Skellingthorpe almost to Pyewipe Junction the trackbed forms an off-road part of National Cycle Route 64.

== See also ==
- List of crossings of the River Trent
