= Pyewipe Junction engine shed =

Coordinates: 53.236°N 0.573°W

Pyewipe Junction engine shed was a motive power depot operated by the Great Eastern Railway (GER) located in Lincolnshire, England.

The depot was one of the GER's outposts and was located on the Great Northern and Great Eastern Joint Railway (GNGEJR) a few miles west of Lincoln railway station. This map of Lincoln's railways shows Pyewipe Junction in the top left hand corner. It is also the junction for the "avoiding line" towards Newark and Nottingham, which in 2013 is still generally used by freight services or trains diverted by engineering works on the East Coast Main Line which do not call at Lincoln station.

== Opening ==
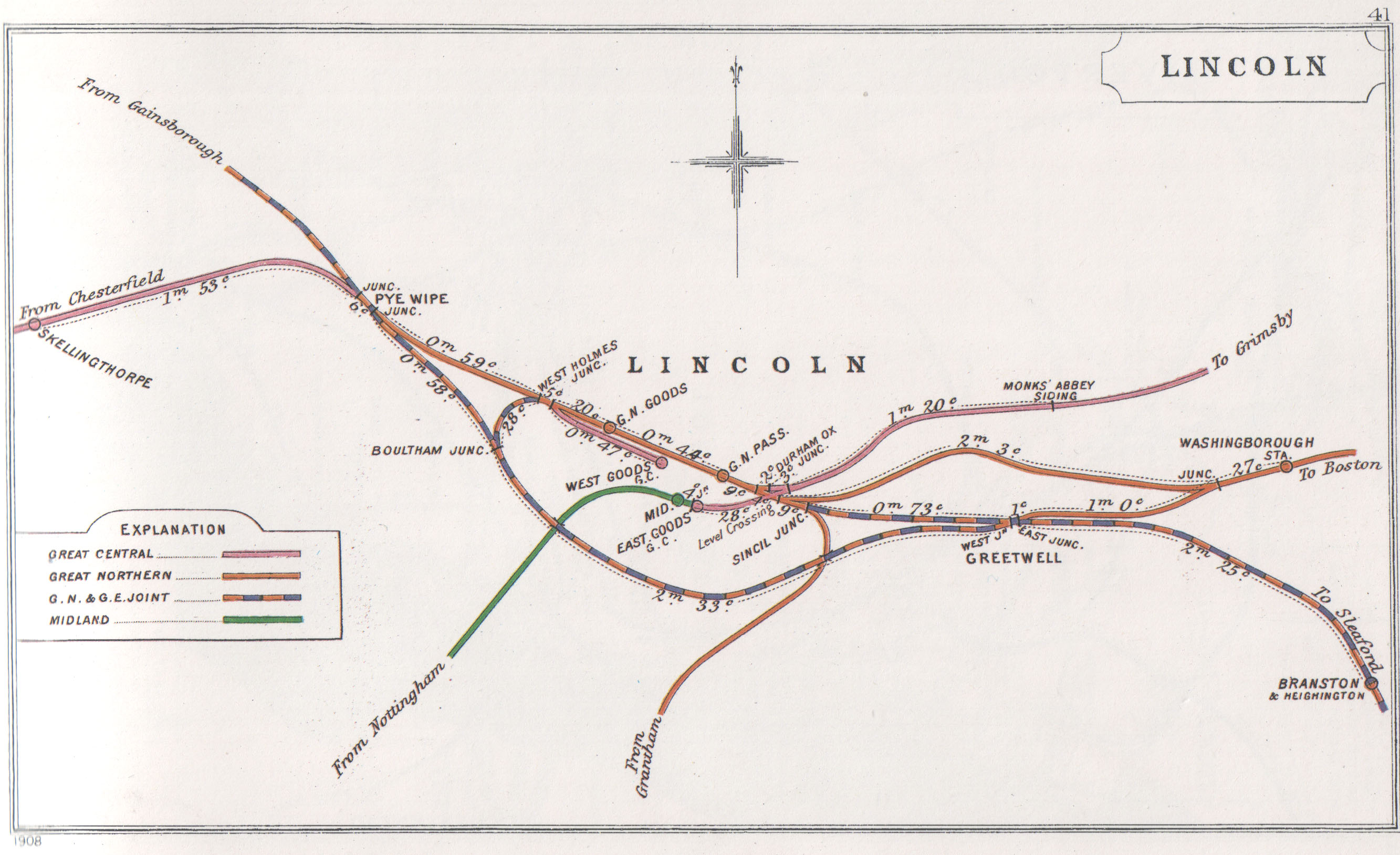
A 1908 Railway Clearing House Junction Diagram showing railways in the vicinity of Lincoln; Pyewipe Junction is in the upper left corner

The Great Eastern and Great Northern operated a joint railway line (the GNGEJR) linking the Yorkshire coalfields to East Anglia and London. Largely a freight railway, it is known that the GER ran trains to York railway station, although they eventually came to an arrangement with the North Eastern Railway (NER), where the GER locomotive was replaced at Lincoln by a NER locomotive. The GER engine would have then proceeded to Pyewipe Junction engine shed for coaling and watering.

The GNGEJR reached Pyewipe Junction in 1882, where some sidings were established. By 1886 some locomotive sidings and a water column had been installed and in 1897 the LD&ECR was opened, which gave the GER running powers over that line as well. Mention of an engine shed at the junction appears in GER minutes in 1899 but nothing appeared to have been built until 1907 or 1908.

The four-track shed was about 150 feet long and 50 feet wide. It was located north of the running line and south of the Foss Dyke Navigation. By 1912 an additional siding was added. In 1914 50 men were recorded as working at the shed. During World War I the increased need for coal saw traffic on the GNGEJR rise, and the sidings and engine shed at Pyewipe Junction were extremely busy. Locomotive coaling was undertaken by hand and although a turntable is evident on plans of the site, it is not known whether it was installed when the shed opened.

== Grouping ==
The GER became part of the London & North Eastern Railway (LNER) in 1923. This was the death knell for the shed, as the LNER had a former GNR shed in Lincoln, and although the GER shed was more conveniently located for the sidings, Pyewipe Junction shed closed on 2 October 1924, with the men transferring to Lincoln ex-GNR shed.

However locomotives were still being dealt with at the site into the 1930s, and in 1939 a water softener was installed on the site (possibly in anticipation of traffic levels in the forthcoming conflict).

The turntable was recorded as still in use in 1947.

== BR days ==
The site was still in use into the 1960s as this Trackplan of Pyewipe Junction area in the 1960s shows. At this stage the turntable and ash pit were still evident as was the 1939 water softening plant.

Pyewipe West was used for crew and locomotive changes and for watering at least until 1963 by Grimsby to Whitland express fish trains and at least until 1962 by Summer weekend holiday traffic to Cleethorpes, Mablethorpe, Skegness and Yarmouth Vauxhall. The trains used the LD&ECR route via Pyewipe Junction. The fish train and most of the Lincolnshire Coast trains turned south off the LD&ECR at Clipstone East Junction to travel via Mansfield Central. The Yarmouth train and a few Lincolnshire Coast trains turned north at Langwith Junction to travel via Clowne South and Killamarsh South Junction, then to Sheffield Victoria or on to Manchester Central. The Summer holiday specials lasted until September 1964, so it is likely that the facilities at Pyewipe were used until then at least.

Other through traffic used the LD&ECR route, Walker shows an example of a steel train for South Wales and the "Boaty" - the Liverpool Central-Harwich Parkeston Quay Boat Train - was sometimes diverted via the LD&EC route.

It is unclear when the site fell out of use, but a number of factors suggest the 1960s:

- Summer holiday specials ended in 1964
- the Great Central Main Line closed as a through route in 1966, ending any possibility of through trains such as the Whitland Fish
- the rundown of steam reduced the need for loco changes and watering stops
- the rundown of freight traffic reduced the need for both direct trains and diversions.

The LD&ECR line west from Pyewipe remained in use until a derailment at Clifton-on-Trent on 21 February 1980 led to the immediate closure of the line from High Marnham Power Station through the station to Pyewipe Junction. These tracks were subsequently lifted.

From the site of Doddington and Harby onwards through the site of Skellingthorpe station almost to Pyewipe Junction the trackbed forms an off-road part of National Cycle Route 64.

The Quail Trackplans Map dated March 1988 show no sidings (freight or otherwise) at Pyewipe Junction.

== Allocation ==
During the First World War, six R-O-D 2-8-0 locomotives were allocated to the shed for work on the GNGEJR.

The allocation on 1 January 1923 (the first day of the LNER) was as follows.

Class	Wheel Arrangement	Railway	Number allocated
D13	4-4-0	GER	3
J15	0-6-0	GER	3
J16	0-6-0	GER	1
J17	0-6-0	GER	2
J66	0-6-0T	GER	3

Total 12

It is likely that after Grouping Great Central Railway locomotives may have also used the facility. There was a small 2-road GC shed located at Pyewipe sidings opened in 1897 but it is not known when this closed. It had coaling and watering facilities.

== The site today ==
Study of the site using the aerial view on sites such as Bing suggest the site is largely overgrown by woodland (2012).

== Further material ==
- Cupit, J.; Taylor, W. (1984) [1966]. The Lancashire, Derbyshire & East Coast Railway. Oakwood Library of Railway History (2nd ed.). Headington: Oakwood Press. ISBN 978-0-85361-302-2. OL19.
