= Fledborough railway station =

Former railway station in Nottinghamshire, England

Fledborough
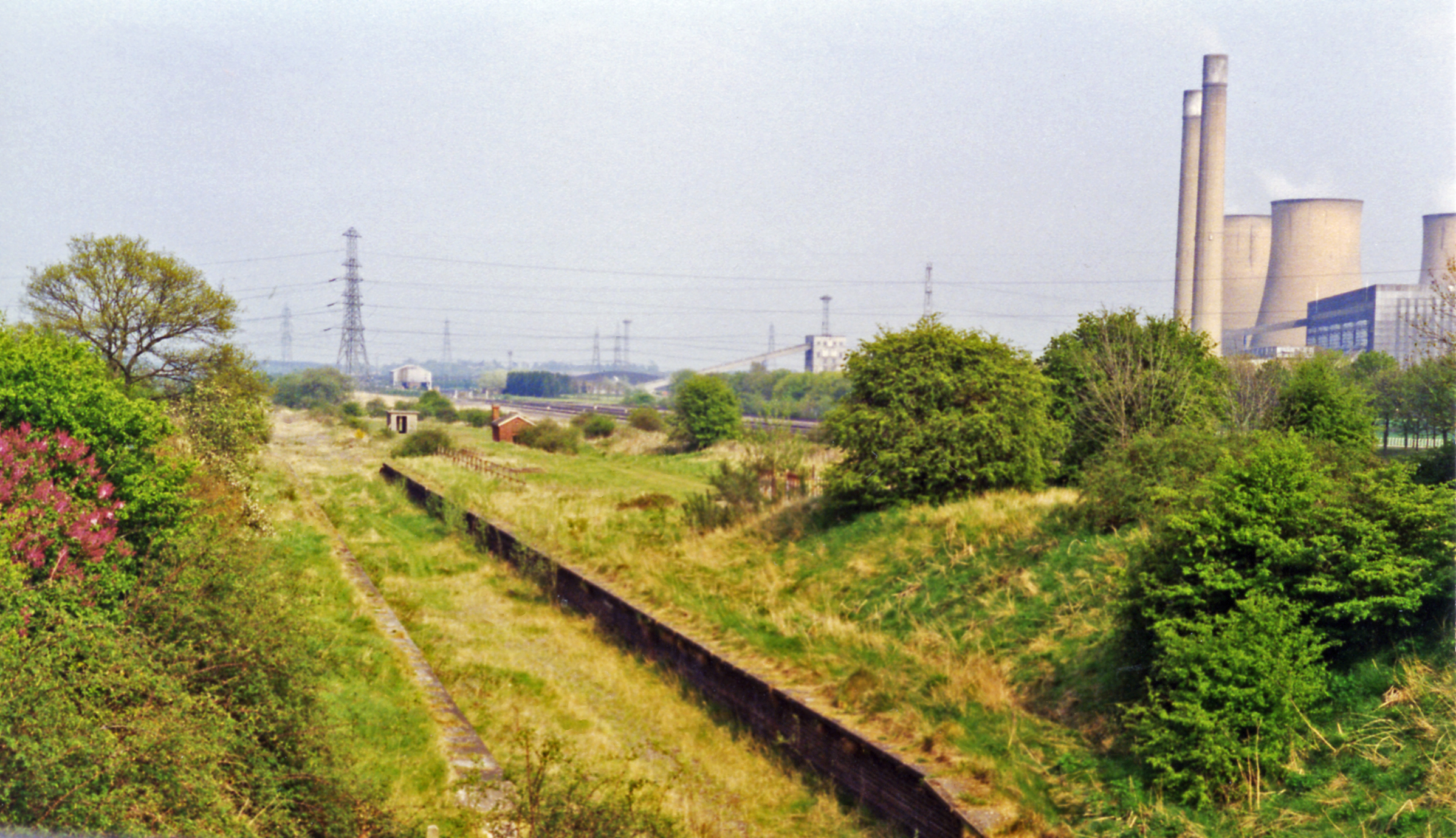
- Remains of the station in 1995

General information
- Location: Nottinghamshire; England
- Coordinates: 53.2313°N 0.8060°W
- Grid reference: SK 797 711
- Platforms: 2

Other information
- Status: Disused

History
- Original company: Lancashire, Derbyshire and East Coast Railway
- Pre-grouping: Great Central Railway
- Post-grouping: London and North Eastern Railway; British Railways

Key dates
- 15 December 1896: Opened
- 19 September 1955: Closed
Location

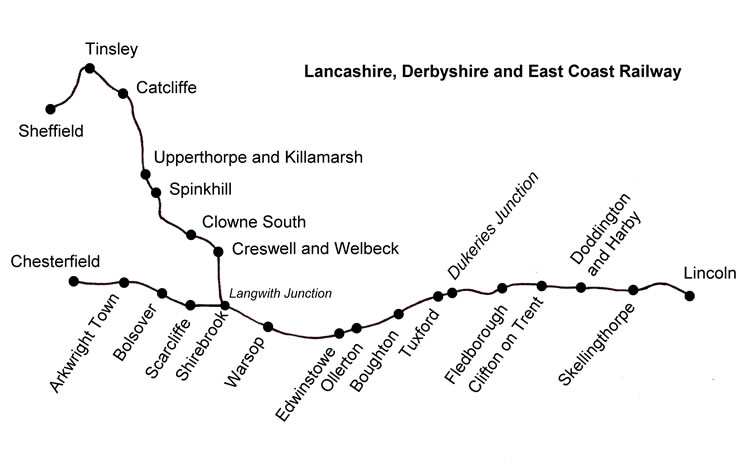
LD&ECR and Sheffield District Railway

Fledborough railway station is a former railway station south west of Fledborough, Nottinghamshire, England. It was located on the Lancashire, Derbyshire and East Coast Railway on the part of the line leading towards Lincoln, this part of the line has been lifted and the station buildings are demolished.

== Context ==
Fledborough Railway Station contained 2 platforms, with platform 1 carrying the main building and platform 2 a shelter. Platform 2 also contained a stairway linking to a path toward the main road. Changing between the two platforms would have been done through the use of a wooden pedestrian crossing situated on the western side of the station. Fledborough also featured facilities for goods transport, including a goods platform which was far shorter in size compared to the passenger platforms and mainly saw use from mail trains, there was also a goods shed slightly further east of the station with 2 sidings, one leading into the goods dock of Fledborough Station and the other stopping slightly east of the station. The station was opened by the LD&ECR in 1896 and closed by British Railways in 1955. The station and the stationmaster's house were built in the company's standard style.

The station building contained various facilities that passengers travelling could use, these included separated waiting rooms for male and female passengers, toilets, a station masters office where travellers would purchase tickets and a porters room. There were proposals drafted in the 1950s to convert the station building into accommodation for British Transport Commission staff however these plans never came to fruition and the station was left abandoned for many years after.

From Tuxford the line fell gently past Marnham, where High Marnham Power Station was built in 1960. The junction to the power station was about 500 yards west of Fledborough Station, which was, in turn, just before the line crossed the River Trent by means of the Fledborough Viaduct.

== Signal Box ==
Fledborough railway station also contained a signalbox slightly further east, adjacent to the goods shed, this signalbox saw a relatively short life compared to others along the line, as was closed and demolished when High Marnham power stations signalbox was opened, and subsequently control of this section of the line was transferred to High Marnham signal box.

== Former services ==
There never was a Sunday service at Fledborough.

In 1922 three trains per day plied between Chesterfield Market Place and Lincoln with a market day extra on Fridays between Shirebrook North and Lincoln. All these trains called at Fledborough.

From 1951 trains stopped running through to Chesterfield, turning back at Shirebrook North instead. Otherwise the same pattern continued until the last train on 17 September 1955.

Trains continued to pass, including Summer excursions which continued until 1964, but the picture was of progressive decline. A derailment east of Fledborough Viaduct on 21 February 1980 led to the immediate closure of the line from High Marnham Power Station through Fledborough to Pyewipe Junction. These tracks were subsequently lifted.

== Modern times ==
Today the trackbed towards Ollerton is a test track. While eastwards from the site of Fledborough Station to near Pyewipe Junction the trackbed forms an off-road part of National Cycle Route 64.

What remains of the station today is merely the platforms, these being increasingly overgrown as time passes on. A recreation of the original "Fledborough" station sign sits on the westbound platform, with some of what remains of the original fencing strewn along both platforms. The original steps to the stationmasters house have been completely covered by foliage.

Preceding station	Disused railways	Following station
Dukeries Junction; Line and station closed	Great Central Railway; Lancashire, Derbyshire and East Coast Railway	Clifton-on-Trent; Line and station closed
