= Langwith =

Langwith may refer to:

- Langwith, Derbyshire, several small settlements near to larger Shirebrook
- Langwith College, a college of the University of York
- Langwith Junction, Derbyshire
- Langwith railway station, Derbyshire
- Langwith-Whaley Thorns railway station, Derbyshire
- Nether Langwith, Nottinghamshire
