= Langwith-Whaley Thorns railway station =

Railway station in Derbyshire, England

Coordinates: 53°13′57.7″N 1°12′33.4″W

Langwith-Whaley Thorns
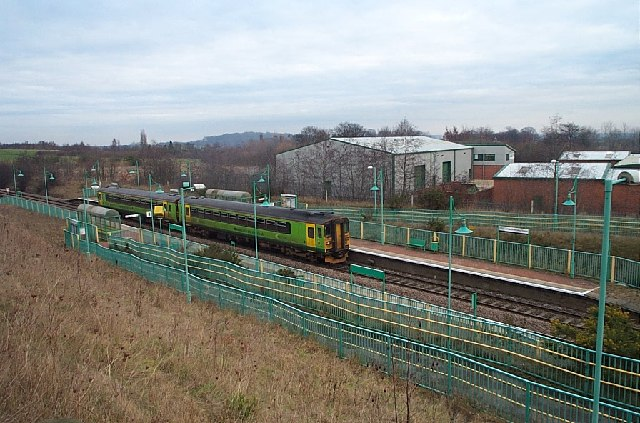

General information
- Location: Nether Langwith, Bolsover; England
- Grid reference: SK528708
- Manager: East Midlands Railway
- Platforms: 2

Other information
- Station code: LAG
- Classification: DfT category F2

History
- Opened: May 1998

Passengers
- 2021/22: ▲12,268
- 2022/23: ▼9,744
- 2023/24: ▼8,808
- 2024/25: ▲9,816
- 2025/26: ▼9,340
Location
Notes
- Passenger statistics from the Office of Rail and Road

Langwith-Whaley Thorns railway station is in Derbyshire, England. The station is on the Robin Hood Line 22 1/4 miles (36 km) north of Nottingham towards Worksop.

This station serves the villages of Nether Langwith and Whaley Thorns which are both on the boundary of Derbyshire and Nottinghamshire. It also serves the village of Langwith in Derbyshire.

The Robin Hood Line was opened to reinstate a Nottingham to Worksop service, which ran from 1875 until it was withdrawn in October 1964. After withdrawal the station at Langwith was razed to the ground. When the Robin Hood service was being planned it was decided that, rather than build a new station on the original site in Langwith Maltings, the community would be better served by building the new station about half a mile further North in the larger communities of Nether Langwith and Whaley Thorns. The "old" Langwith station is described at Langwith station (1875-1964).

== Services ==
All services at Langwith-Whaley Thorns are operated by East Midlands Railway.

On weekdays and Saturdays, the station is generally served by a train every two hours northbound to Worksop and southbound to Nottingham via Mansfield Woodhouse.

There is currently no Sunday service at the station since the previous service of four trains per day was withdrawn in 2011. Sunday services at the station are due to recommence at the station during the life of the East Midlands franchise.

Preceding station	National Rail	Following station
Shirebrook	East Midlands Railway: Robin Hood Line; Monday-Saturday only	Creswell
