= Bulwell Forest railway station =

Former railway station in Nottingham, England

Coordinates: 53.00309°N 1.18043°W

Bulwell Forest
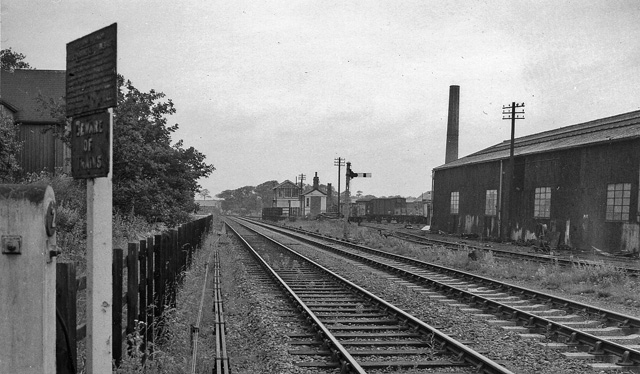
- Site of the station in 1963

General information
- Location: Bulwell, City of Nottingham; England
- Grid reference: SK551453
- Platforms: 2

Other information
- Status: Disused

History
- Original company: Great Northern Railway
- Post-grouping: London and North Eastern Railway

Key dates
- 1 October 1887: Opened
- 23 September 1929: Closed
Location

Bulwell Forest railway station was a former station in Nottingham on the Great Northern Railway Nottingham to Shirebrook line.

The station should not be confused with the Bulwell Forest tram stop of the Nottingham Express Transit (NET) system, which is some 750 metres (2,460 ft) to the north-west. The tram stop is situated on the alignment of the former Midland Railway route from Nottingham to Worksop, which is now shared between the NET and the Robin Hood railway line, but there was never a railway station at its location.

Preceding station	Disused railways	Following station
Bestwood Colliery	London and North Eastern Railway; Leen Valley line	Daybrook
