= Newstead and Annesley railway station =

Former railway station in Nottinghamshire, England

Coordinates: 53.071906°N 1.220136°W

Newstead and Annesley
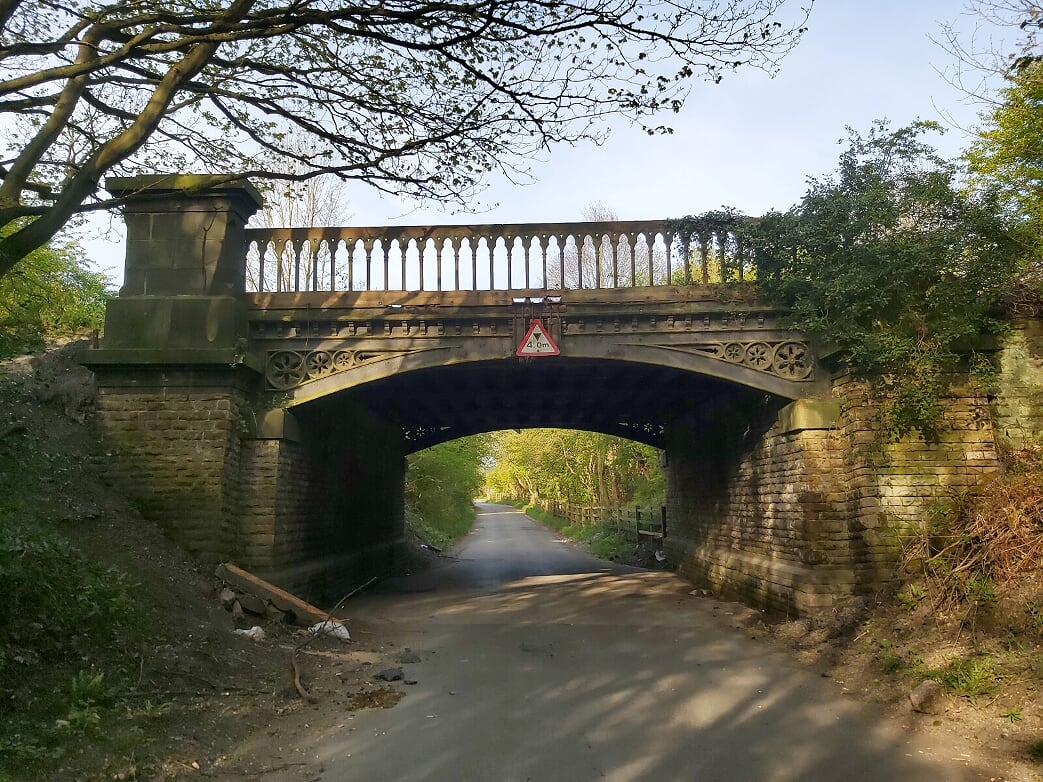

General information
- Location: Newstead, Borough of Gedling; England
- Grid reference: SK533509
- Platforms: 2

Other information
- Status: Disused

History
- Original company: Great Northern Railway
- Pre-grouping: Great Northern Railway
- Post-grouping: London and North Eastern Railway; London Midland Region of British Railways

Key dates
- 2 October 1882: Opened
- 14 September 1931: Closed to public passenger service
- 10 September 1962: ceased used by staff
- 3 May 1965: goods facilities withdrawn
Location

Newstead and Annesley railway station was a station on the Great Northern Railway's Nottingham to Shirebrook line.

== History ==
Preceding station	Disused railways	Following station
Sutton-in-Ashfield Town	London and North Eastern Railway; Leen Valley line	Linby

== Present day ==
No trace of the station remains. The site is now a country park.
