= Linby (Great Northern Railway) railway station =

Former railway station in Nottinghamshire, England

Coordinates: 53.052615°N 1.205641°W

Linby (Great Northern Railway)
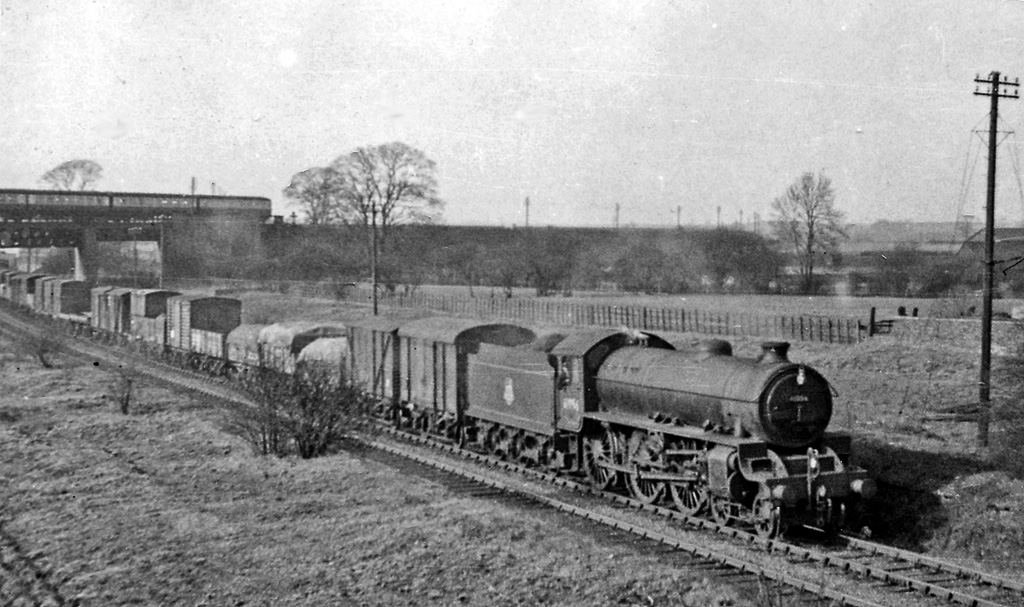

General information
- Location: Linby, Ashfield; England
- Grid reference: SK533509
- Platforms: 2

Other information
- Status: Disused

History
- Original company: Great Northern Railway
- Pre-grouping: Great Northern Railway
- Post-grouping: London and North Eastern Railway; London Midland Region of British Railways

Key dates
- 2 October 1882: Opened
- 1 July 1916: Closed to passengers
- 3 May 1965: goods facilities withdrawn
Location

Linby (Great Northern Railway) was a railway station on the Great Northern Railway's Nottingham to Shirebrook line.

== History ==
Preceding station	Disused railways	Following station
Newstead and Annesley	London and North Eastern Railway; Leen Valley line	Hucknall Town

== Present day ==
No trace of the station remains. The site is now a footpath but a possible railway building does survive in private ownership.
