= Bestwood Colliery railway station =

Former railway station in Nottinghamshire, England

Coordinates: 53.02037°N 1.18320°W

Bestwood Colliery
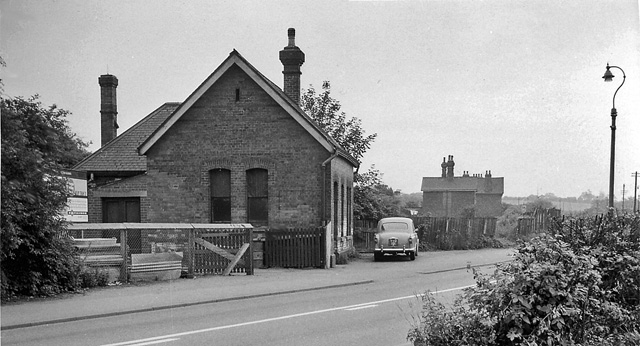
- Station building in 1963

General information
- Location: Bestwood Village, Gedling; England
- Grid reference: SK548473
- Platforms: 2

Other information
- Status: Disused

History
- Original company: Great Northern Railway
- Post-grouping: London and North Eastern Railway; London Midland Region of British Railways

Key dates
- 2 October 1882: Opened as Bestwood
- March 1883: Renamed Bestwood Colliery
- March 1907: Renamed Bestwood
- October 1907: Renamed Bestwood Colliery
- 14 September 1931: Closed to passengers
- 7 April 1958: Goods facilities withdrawn
Location

Bestwood Colliery railway station was a former station on the Great Northern Railway Nottingham to Shirebrook line.

| Preceding station | Disused railways | Following station |
|---|---|---|
| Butler's Hill | London and North Eastern Railway; Leen Valley line | Bulwell Forest |
