= Leen Valley lines of the Great Northern Railway =

The Leen Valley lines of the Great Northern Railway were railway branch lines built to access the collieries in the Nottinghamshire coalfield in England. The Midland Railway had long been dominant in the area, but there was resentment against its monopolistic policies from coalowners, who encouraged the Great Northern Railway to build a line. The Leen Valley Line was opened in 1881; it ran as far as Annesley colliery. A passenger service was run the following year, and very considerable volumes of coal were hauled.

Coal owners in areas further north made representations to the Great Northern Railway, which agreed to extend the line, and the Leen Valley Extension Line opened in 1892. The Manchester, Sheffield and Lincolnshire Railway had built a line on a nearby alignment including a long tunnel, and to avoid the cost of duplicating the tunnel, the GNR arranged to use the MS&LR tunnel to connect its Extension line to the original section. At its northern extremity, the line connected to the Lancashire, Derbyshire and East Coast Railway at Shirebrook. A passenger operation was worked on the Extension line too, but again coal traffic was massively dominant. In fact the passenger service was discontinued in 1931.

In the 1960s and 1970s coal production in the area declined steeply, and the duplication of railway routes in the area meant that rationalisation was inevitable: it was the former GNR lines that bore the brunt of this. In the 1980s plans were formulated to reopen a passenger train service from Nottingham to Mansfield; this was to be mainly on the former Midland Railway route, but a short section of the former GNR line was used around Kirkby-in-Ashfield. The new service and route, marketed as the Robin Hood Line, was opened progressively from 1995 onwards.

== Background ==
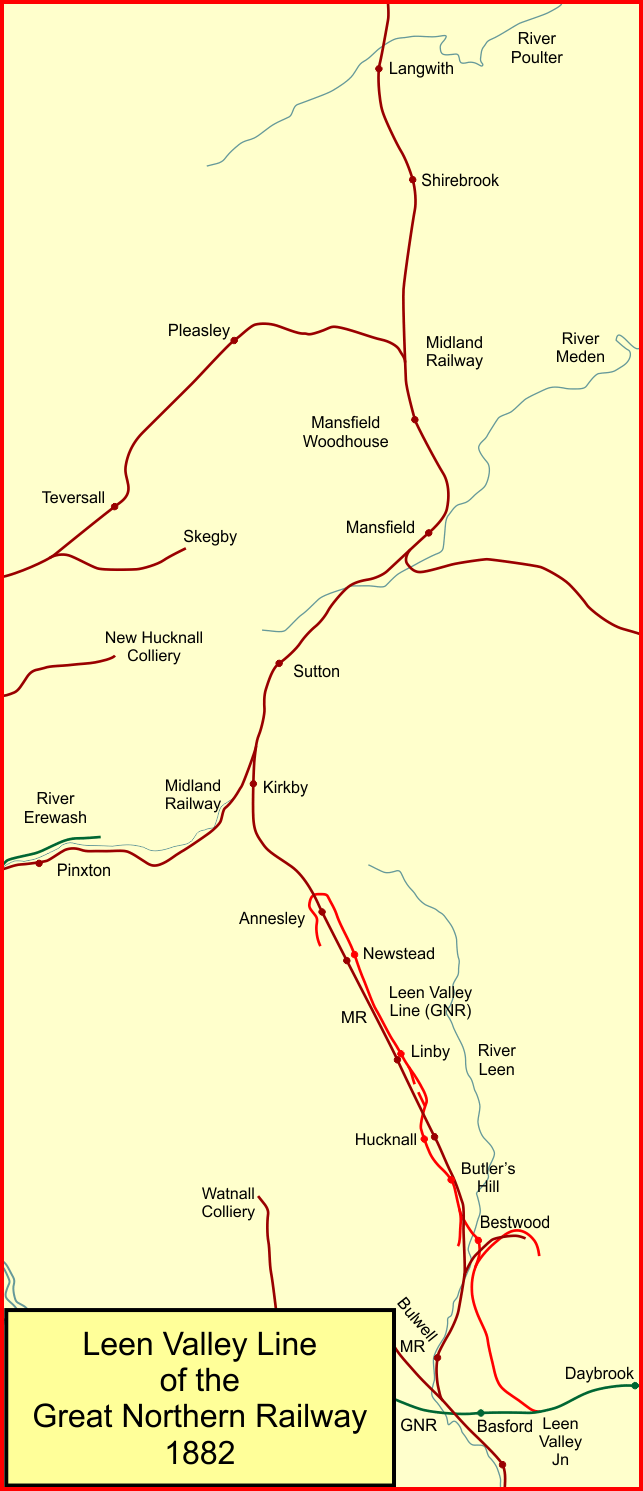
The Leen Valley line in 1882

The Great Northern Railway had established a terminal in Nottingham in 1857, and used the Ambergate, Nottingham, Boston and Eastern Junction Railway to reach it from its main line at Grantham. It later leased the Ambergate company.

There was considerable colliery activity in the coalfields to the north and west of Nottingham, and for the time being the Midland Railway was dominant in serving the pits. The Great Northern Railway sought to share in the business of hauling the coal to southern and eastern markets; at the same time the Midland Railway went to considerable lengths to exclude the GNR from the access it sought, and in 1871 prevented the GNR from using Midland Railway lines in the area at all. This exacerbated dissatisfaction on the part of coalowners, who saw that the Midland was exploiting its monopoly of carriage of coal to their disadvantage, and they encouraged the provision of competing railway facilities.

The GNR obtained Parliamentary authority for what became its Derbyshire and Staffordshire extension, a new independent railway line from the GNR line at Colwick, on the eastern margin of Nottingham. The new line was to circle round the north of Nottingham and head west, connecting in Kimberley and Ilkeston on the way to Derby and Burton on Trent, with a fork to link in Pinxton. These lines opened between 1875 and 1878.

== Demand for colliery connections ==
There was also a concentration of collieries in the valley of the River Leen, which runs south from near Newstead to join the River Trent west of Nottingham. Railway connection in this area too was dominated by the Midland Railway. During the final stages of the construction of the Derbyshire lines, the GNR was receiving representations from the Leen Valley collieries. A line was surveyed and a Bill submitted for the 1880 session of Parliament. The line would be broadly parallel to the Midland Railway's Nottingham to Mansfield line.

The Midland Railway saw the danger and suggested in June that if the Bill was withdrawn the charges for the use of its line would be substantially reduced. Reductions from 1s 7d down to 1s were mentioned. The GNR had suffered heavily in the past under the Midland Railway's traffic arrangements, and refused. The Leen Valley's Act was passed on 6 August 1880.

== Leen Valley Line: construction and opening ==
Construction was put in hand immediately: on 5 November 1880 a contractor named Lovatt undertook the work for £89,077 and to complete by 1 January 1882. Saxby and Farmer were to install the signalling. The new line was to make a junction with the Derbyshire extension line near Old Basford and run north, paralleling the Midland Railway's line from Nottingham to Mansfield. In doing so the new line crossed the Midland line twice, and connected with collieries at Bestwood, Hucknall, Linby, Newstead, and Annesley. The GNR called the branch line the Leen Valley Line, and the junction with the Derbyshire & Staffordshire Extension line was named Leen Valley Junction.

From Leen Valley junction the line ran for 6 miles 53 chains to Newstead, and was double track throughout when completed. There were colliery branches to Bestwood Park, four to Hucknall Colliery, two to Linby Colliery, two to Bestwood Colliery, and two at the end of the line to Annesley Colliery. Gradients were stiff, with considerable stretches of 1 in 70 and 1 in 75. Leen Valley junction signalbox was commissioned on 9 May 1881 and in July coal traffic from Bestwood Colliery began over a single line. On 18 October the line was opened to Linby Colliery and on 27 October 1881, the line opened throughout for coal. Twelve passenger trains each way on weekdays and two on Sundays, began between Nottingham and Newstead on 2 October 1882. The result was an increase for the half-year to 31 December 1881, of over a quarter of a million tons of coal carried over the GNR system.

== MS&LR extension to Annesley ==
The MS&LR Chairman, Sir Edward Watkin, had for some time been known to want to extend the Manchester, Sheffield and Lincolnshire Railway to London. In time for the 1889 session of Parliament, the MS&LR presented a Bill for a line from Beighton, a little east of Sheffield, southwards to Annesley, to make an end-on junction there with the GNR Leen Valley line. On the face of it the scheme looked like a harmless approach to get access to the collieries, but the GNR Board suspected that this was a move towards a London extension. Watkin also controlled the Metropolitan Railway, which reached as far north as Verney in Buckinghamshire, and in the same Session, had deposited a Bill for a line from Quainton Road to Moreton Pinkney; the gap between Annesley and Morton Pinkney was only 60 miles.

The MS&LR denied any intention to build south from Annesley, but declined to make that a formal undertaking. Amid much railway politics, it became evident that Parliament was going to grant the MS&LR wishes, and the GNR acquiesced, gaining running powers to Sheffield over the MS&LR as a sweetener. The MS&LR Annesley branch was passed on 26 July 1889. In fact the MS&LR promise was soon proven to be false, and it had a London extension bill in the 1891 session, but with London and North Western Railway and Midland Railway as well as GNR opposition it failed. Nevertheless, it was obvious that the MS&LR would try again the following year, and the GNR board reviewed their strategy: should they continue to oppose the scheme, or go along with it and try to get the best accommodation out of it? They reluctantly chose the latter course of action. As part of that, a Leen Valley Extension scheme was revived.

The MS&LR extension southwards from Beighton reached an end-on junction with the GNR Leen Valley line at Annesley, north of Newstead, on 24 October 1892. In accordance with the agreement, MS&LR goods and coal trains ran to Nottingham, followed by passenger trains on 2 January 1893: there were four each way via the Nottingham Suburban Railway to London Road. From 28 January, there were a few GNR passenger trains over the MS&LR as far as Staveley, but only for a few months. The GNR obtained access to several collieries, but unfortunately for the GNR, an MS&LR-LNWR agreement meant that the LNWR did too.

Meanwhile, the fresh MS&LR extension bill passed most stages by June 1892 but, held up when Parliament was dissolved, did not become an Act until 28 March 1893.

== Leen Valley Extension Line ==
The GNR now decided that it should extend further north from Annesley, and this became the project for the Leen Valley Extension line. It was authorised on 20 June 1892, with an amending act on 29 June 1893. At this time the GNR had so many commitments that construction was delayed. Stanton Ironworks Co., which had collieries at Silverhill, Teversal and Pleasley and Sutton-in-Ashfield, asked the GNR to hurry up.

As originally planned, the line would have begun at the end of the original line, at Annesley, which would have meant construction of a tunnel under Robin Hood Hills. But as the MS&LR opened its extension to that spot through a tunnel built for their line, it was arranged that GNR trains would use the MS&LR line through their Annesley tunnel, and then for 450 yards to South Kirkby junction, where the new line would diverge. W Binns had the contract, and began work in June 1895, but got into difficulties excavating a deep cutting through rock.

Work continued with financial support from the GNR, through a further deep cutting, and a bridge under the Midland Railway, where there was a difficult operation on a Saturday night to install the bridge before the first Midland train on Sunday morning; the line continued by the Erewash headwaters to Sutton-in-Ashfield, a distance of four miles. Some land came from Lord Carnarvon, then the line went through another limestone cutting into the Meden Valley, through Skegby to Pleasley colliery. From Skegby, there was a 2-mile branch to Teversal and Silver Hill collieries. On 8 February 1897 the single line was opened for coal traffic to Skegby, Teversal and Silverhill.

Meanwhile, the board decided to operate a passenger service when the line opened, and in April gave a contract to Pattinsons for stations at Sutton, Skegby and Teversal for £14,742. Owing to Binns' difficulties, his contract was transferred on 7 May to the Halifax Commercial Banking Co. The Skegby to Pleasley section opened for coal and general goods on 1 March 1898. A passenger service of seven trains each way between Nottingham London Road and Skegby, and two each way as far as Sutton, all via the Nottingham Suburban Line, were run on weekdays and two Suttons each way via Gedling on Sundays; these services began on 4 April. Sutton station, with street-level booking office and covered stairways down to the platforms, was on an elaborate scale, the most centrally situated in the town. Skegby, a mile further on, was smaller, on the high level with booking office below. Teversal received a small passenger station too, but never had a regular service, only miners' trains and occasional excursions.

The opening was celebrated by special trains from King's Cross, and Nottingham, bringing guests to a lunch at Skegby, at which Mr Capel presided.

== Lancashire, Derbyshire and East Coast Railway ==
The Lancashire, Derbyshire and East Coast Railway was an ambitious scheme, with the primary intention of conveying coal. It was unable to secure the investment needed to make its network, and only a greatly reduced part was made. It opened its main section, a west to east line, on 8 March 1897. It ran through Shirebrook, and the Leen Valley Extension line made a connection to it, opening in 1898. The junction was named Langwith Junction, facing towards Chesterfield. The GNR Langwith station later became known as Shirebrook South, where passenger services began on 1 November 1901. A connection was made from just south of the station to Shirebrook Colliery, opened on 26 November 1900.

== Completion of the Extension Line ==
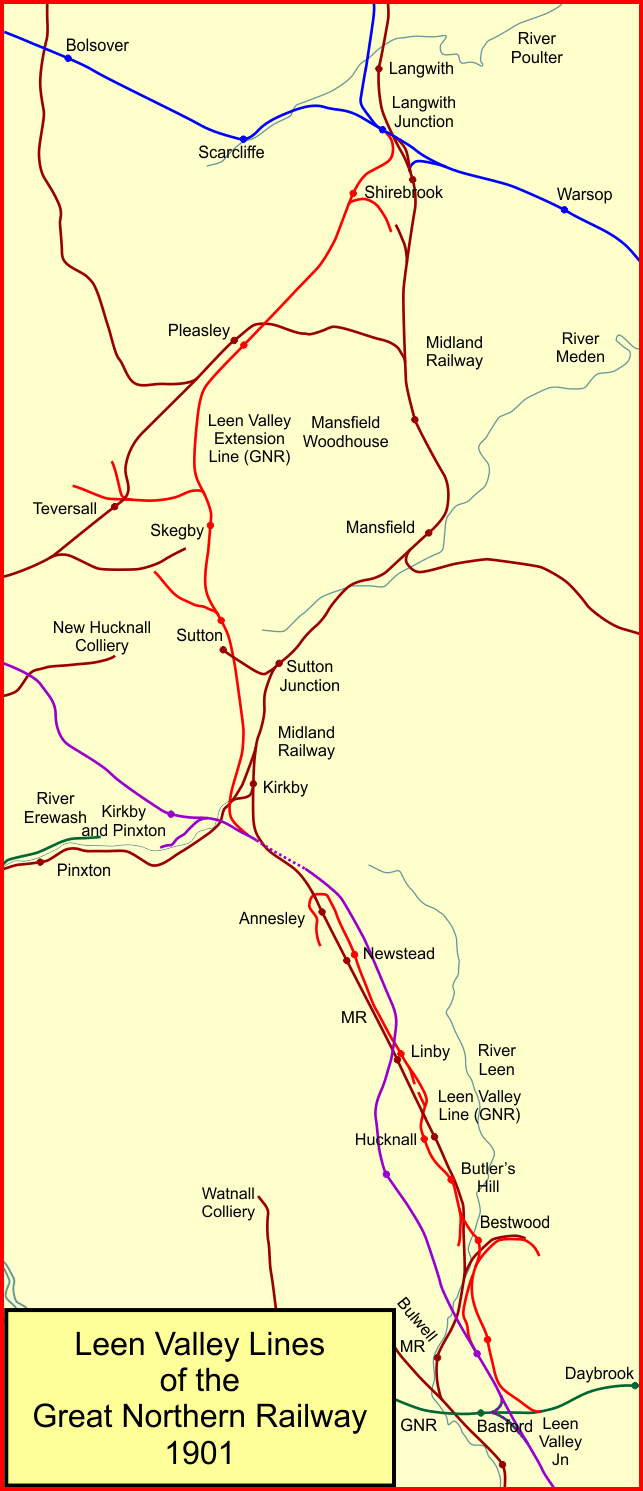
The Leen Valley Lines in 1901

The original powers for the Leen Valley Extension Line included a branch to the colliery at Langwith, north of the LD&ECR, but in October 1895 the GNR arranged to join the LD&ECR east of Langwith station instead, forming a slightly shorter route, and giving a direct run towards both Chesterfield and the Beighton line; there was a branch to the colliery off that line, with running powers there over the section of the LD&ECR; that company obtained reciprocal running powers to Shirebrook colliery. An act of 29 July 1896 authorised the deviation, and the Shirebrook Colliery branch. A north to west curve was laid to the GCR (former MS&LR) at Kirkby in 1897, but was rarely used and was removed after a few years.

From Pleasley, the line continued above Meden valley, leaving it at Pleasley vale where a rock cutting was required to Shirebrook station, and then a high embankment above the town to Langwith Junction. The line reached Shirebrook Colliery (on the branch south of the station), on 26 November 1900, and on 29 May 1901, Langwith Junction for coal and general goods. Passenger trains to Pleasley and Shirebrook began on 1 November, ten each way, extras on Saturdays. The Shirebrook to Langwith section had heavy coal traffic, and caused more use of powers over the LD&ECR. A south to west curve at Langwith was discussed, but the work was limited to the laying of further sidings. The Shirebrook passenger trains were extended to Langwith, and over the LD&ECR to Chesterfield from 1 February 1903, but soon withdrawn, and not restored until LNER days.

== MS&LR London Extension ==
Contrary to the promise that no southward extension from Annesley was intended by the MS&LR, the company proceeded with the project. It ran down the Leen Valley, providing a third railway in the confines of the valley. The London Extension line came south from Annesley (no longer an end-on junction) through Bulwell, over the GNR Derbyshire Extension line to New Basford, through Sherwood Rise tunnel to Nottingham. Connections at the intersection were complicated. The MS&LR (soon to be GCR) line ran broadly north to south and the GNR Derbyshire line ran east to west. The Leen Valley line running southward made a connection from Moorthorpe Junction (or Bestwood Junction) into the GCR southbound at Bulwell North Junction, grade separated on the GCR line. This was known as the Bestwood Branch and was joint GCR and GNR, and it opened in 1898. Also joint and also opened in 1898 was a west to north spur, the Basford Branch, from Basford West Junction to Bulwell South Junction. These connections were authorised by an MS&L Act on 6 July 1895.

A south-to-west spur (the "Bagthorpe branch") was provided by the GNR, Bagthorpe junction to Basford East Junction, grade separated over the GNR line, opened in 1900. Another connection was authorised by an MS&LR Act on 6 July 1895, from Moorbridge junction between Bestwood and Bulwell Forest on the Leen Valley line, to Bulwell Common on the MS&LR London extension. The Act also authorised a north-to-west spur, to Basford and Bulwell.

The Manchester, Sheffield and Lincolnshire Railway changed its title to the Great Central Railway on 1 August 1897.

== Mansfield Railway ==
As late as 1909 some coalowners in the Mansfield area approached the GNR, requesting a GNR branch connection, but they were refused. As a result, they formed their own company, the Mansfield Railway. They got Great Central Railway support, and deposited a bill for 1910. The GNR and the Midland Railway opposed. The line was to be from Kirkby south, on the GCR extension, just beyond where the GN Leen Valley extension diverged, cross the GNR curve to Kirkby north, and the Leen Valley extension near Sutton-in-Ashfield, and go via Mansfield, serving several collieries, to the LD&ECR at Clipstone. The GCR would work it. The GNR suggested use of the Leen Valley extension instead of the southern part, but the promoters said they didn't want another concern between them and the GCR. The Bill was passed in July, giving the GCR a useful line the GNR might have had; moreover the GNR did not get running powers.

== Shirebrook Colliery ==
Shirebrook Colliery became hugely productive. By 1909 the company was exporting coal to France, Russia, Italy, Spain, Germany, Norway, and Sweden. The colliery produced its first million tons of coal in 1970 and over 1.7 million tons by 1986–87, a North Derbyshire Area record. The colliery merged with Pleasley Colliery in 1983, before closing in April 1993.

== Early retrenchment ==
As the colliery activity in the area served by the line declined so did the use of the line itself. The west to north spur from Kirkby North Junction on the Great Central saw little use, despite its high construction costs. It was virtually moribund by 1905, completely disused by 1918 and dismantled about 1922. Passenger traffic had always been a financial liability and the LNER (Note: The London and North Eastern Railway was formed in 1923 from the Great Northern Railway, the Great Central Railway (which was itself successor to the Manchester, Sheffield and Lincolnshire Railway, the Lancashire, Derbyshire and East Coast Railway and the Mansfield Railway); the Midland Railway joined the new London Midland and Scottish Railway in 1923. The LNER and the LMS were nationalised under British Railways in 1948.) withdrew services between Shirebrook South and Nottingham Victoria on 14 September 1931. Several goods yards on the line closed in the 1950s.

Meanwhile, passenger trains serving Sutton in Ashfield Central (on the former Mansfield Railway) had ceased so British Railways reintroduced services from the former Great Northern station at Sutton in Ashfield Town to Nottingham Victoria, on 20 February 1956. The experiment was accompanied by the warning, "use it or lose it"; the warning was apparently not heeded and the service was discontinued from 17 September 1956. The Leen Valley Extension, in conjunction with the former LD&EC branch from Beighton to Langwith Junction, remained an important diversionary route when the main line was closed for engineering work. Excursions to the seaside London and other destinations continued to run from the otherwise-closed stations until the mid-1960s.

As colliery activity declined steeply—Bestwood during 1967 and Kirkby Summit in July 1968—the Leen Valley Extension and former Great Central line between Langwith Junction and Kirkby South Junction closed completely on 27 May 1968.

Annesley Tunnel and its approach cuttings were gradually filled with spoil and refuse. The Midland formation then suffered the same fate, following closure of the section of track from Kirkby in Ashfield to Annesley on 11 October 1970. In order to eliminate the level crossing at Kirkby in Ashfield and release land for building, a diversion was brought into operation on 4 April 1972. This involved constructing a short spur between the Pye Bridge line and the former Great Northern route south of Kirkby, reinstating a short length of the Leen Valley Extension through the town, and laying another spur from the site of Summit Colliery to the Mansfield line at Kirkby Hardwick. South of Langwith, an east-north spur between the LD&ECR and Midland Railway routes opened on 11 November 1974, enabling the remaining part of the Beighton branch from Shirebrook North to Whaley Thorns to be closed. Goods facilities at Mansfield were withdrawn on 2 June 1975, and the remaining railways in the district were now entirely dependent on coal traffic for their survival.

Langwith colliery closed in February 1979 and Teversal in July 1980. These were followed by Silverhill April 1985, Whitwell June 1986, Hucknall October 1986, Newstead March 1987, Mansfield Crown Farm March 1988, Linby July 1988. Annesley was merged with Bentinck in March 1988. Babbington, Annesley, Sherwood and Warsop collieries, all with links to the line, have closed since 1981. Newstead Colliery closed in 1987.

== Later years ==
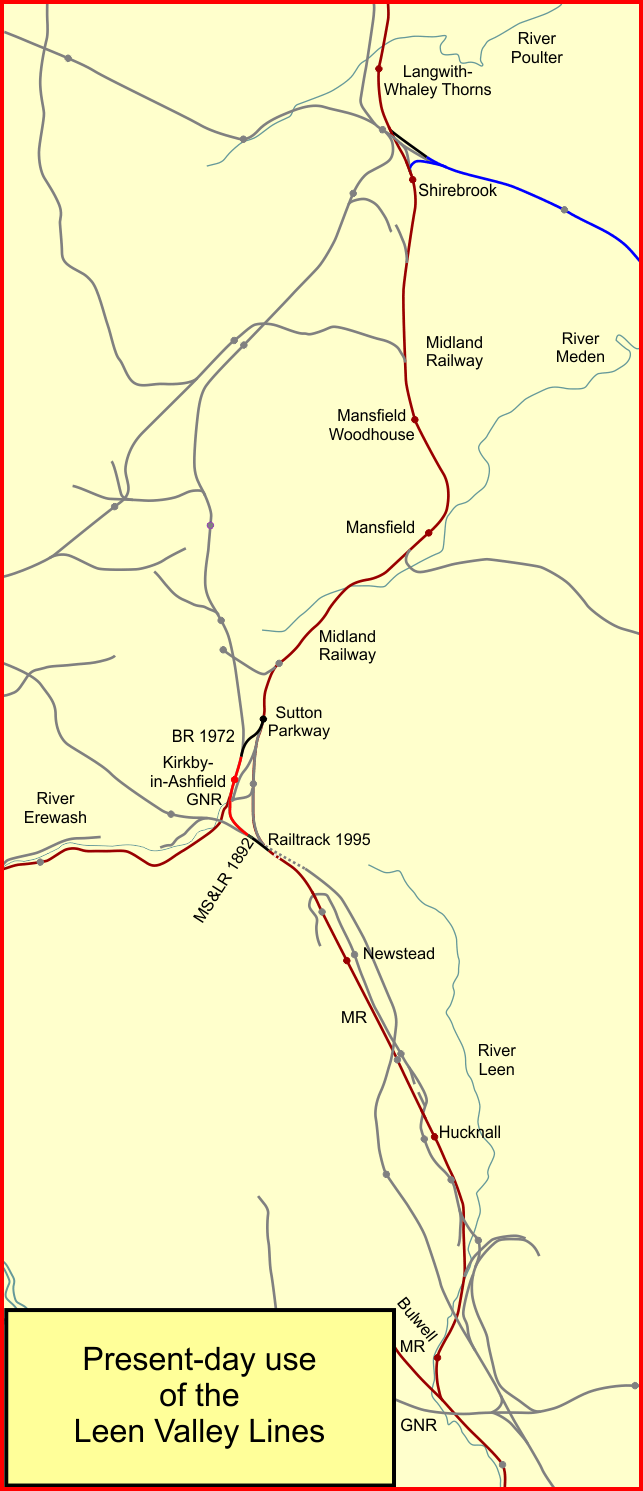
Contemporary Leen Valley lines

There was a long-standing grievance that Mansfield was one of the few large towns which was not connected directly to the national rail network. Discussions began in 1982, and in 1988 agreement was reached that a line could be reopened for passengers provided local authorities along the route were willing to provide subsidies.

The resulting railway has been named the "Robin Hood Line". It was reopened in stages from Nottingham northwards. The majority of the route follows the former Midland Railway Leen Valley line as far as Sutton-in-Ashfield, but north from there it uses the Great Northern route through Kirkby before reverting to the Midland formation. As part of reinstating the route it was necessary to excavate the Midland tunnel at Annesley, which had been filled in after closure. The first section from Nottingham to Newstead opened in 1993, extending to Mansfield Woodhouse in 1995, Kirkby in 1996 and finally through to Worksop on the former MS&LR line from Lincoln to Sheffield in 1998.

Between Kirkby tunnel and Sutton Parkway station, the train uses trackbeds or track alignments from the Midland Railway dating from 1848; Railtrack dating from 1995; the Manchester, Sheffield and Lincolnshire Railway dating from 1892, though now raised by 30 feet; the Great Northern Railway dating from 1896, though now partly above it; British Rail from 1972; and the Mansfield and Pinxton Railway (originally horsedrawn) dating from 1819.

== Locations ==
=== Leen Valley (first line) ===
- Leen Valley Junction;
- Bulwell Forest; opened 1 October 1887; closed 23 September 1929;
- Moorthorpe Junction;
- Bestwood Junction;
- Bestwood Colliery; opened 2 October 1882; Colliery not used at first; closed 14 September 1931;
- Calveton Branch Junction;
- Butler's Hill; opened 2 October 1882; closed 14 September 1931;
- Hucknall; opened 2 October 1882; renamed Hucknall Town 1 July 1923; closed to public 14 September 1931; closed to railwaymen 10 September 1962;
- Linby Colliery South Junction;
- Linby; opened 2 October 1882; closed 1 July 1916;
- Newstead Colliery Junction;
- Newstead; opened 2 October 1882; renamed Newstead & Annesley 1891; closed to public 14 September 1931 but railwaymen used until 10 September 1962, known as Newstead East;
- Annesley GN Junction; end on junction with MS&LR
- Annesley Colliery.

=== Leen Valley Extension Line ===
- Kirkby Bentinck South Junction;
- Kirkby Junction;
- Summit Colliery;
- Sutton in Ashfield; opened 4 April 1898 (RCG); renamed Sutton-in-Ashfield Town 1 July 1923; closed 14 September 1931; seaside excursions ran on summer Saturdays from 1954 to 1962; reopened fully 20 February 1956; closed 17 September 1956;
- Skegby; opened 4 April 1898; closed 14 September 1931; seaside excursions ran on summer Saturdays from 1954 to 1962;
- Skegby Junction; station facilities may have been provided for railway staff; dates unknown;
- Pleasley Colliery;
- Pleasley; opened 1 November 1901; closed 14 September 1931; seaside excursions ran on summer Saturdays from 1954 to 1962;, the station was renamed Pleasley East for the purpose;
- Shirebrook; opened 1 November 1901; South added 2 June 1924; closed 14 September 1931; seaside excursions ran on summer Saturdays from 1954 to 1962;
- Langwith Junction; junction station on LD&ECR line; opened 8 March 1897; renamed Shirebrook North 2 June 1924; closed 19 September 1955; seaside excursions ran on summer Saturdays from 1954 to 1962.
