= Butler's Hill railway station =

Former railway station in Nottinghamshire, England

Coordinates: 53.030491°N 1.190887°W

Butler's Hill
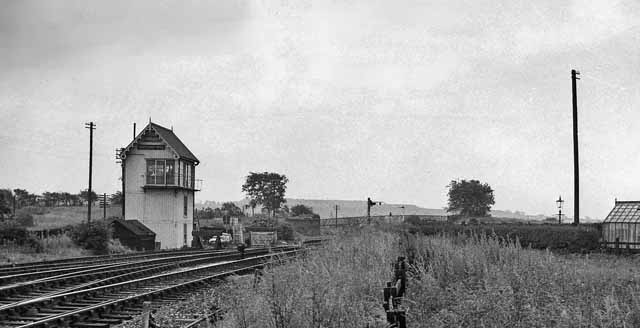

General information
- Location: Butler's Hill, Hucknall; England
- Grid reference: SK543484
- Platforms: 2

Other information
- Status: Disused

History
- Original company: Great Northern Railway
- Post-grouping: London and North Eastern Railway

Key dates
- 2 October 1882: Opened
- 14 September 1931: Closed to passengers
- 26 September 1932: Fully closed
Location

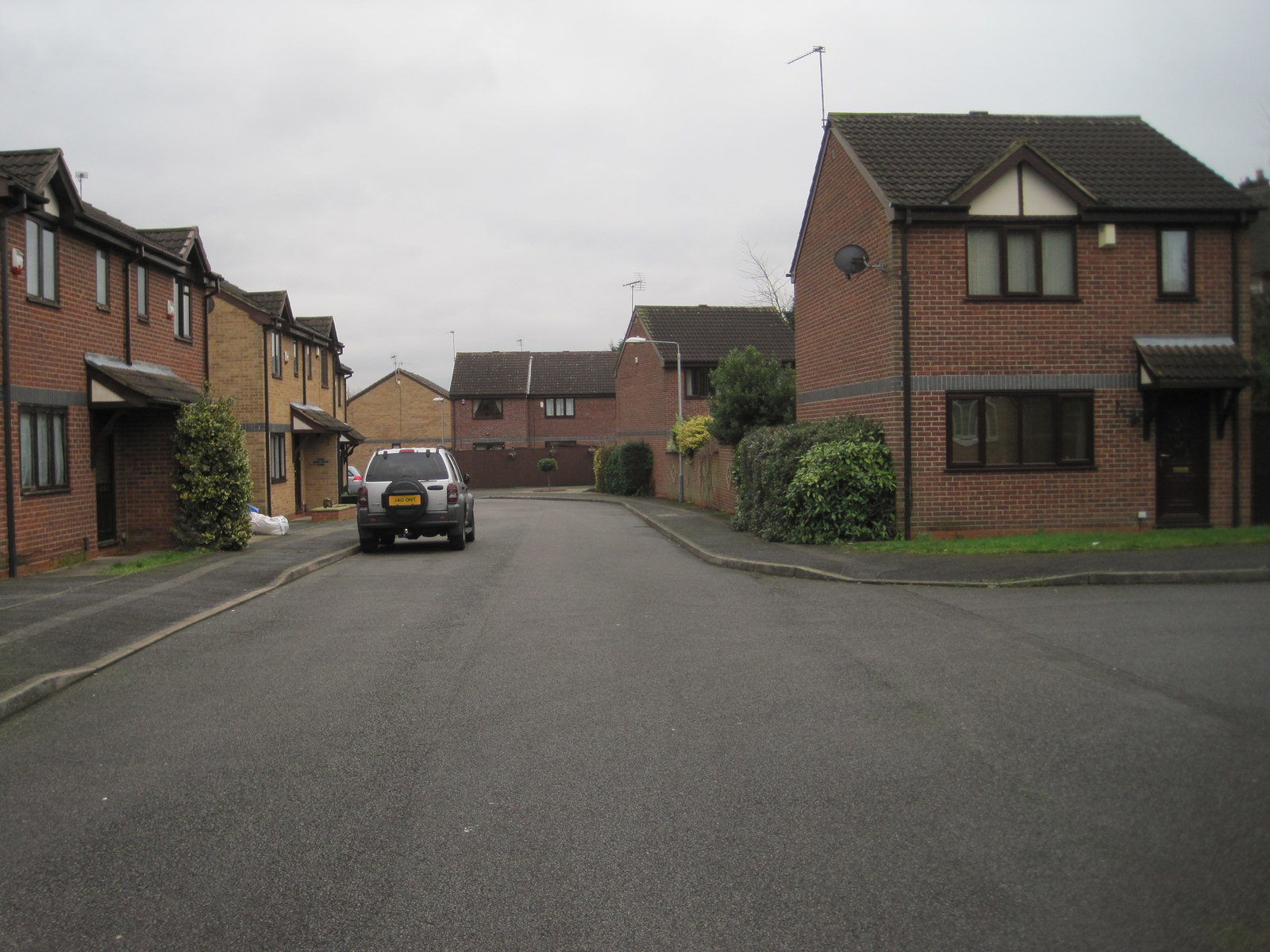
Station site

Butler's Hill railway station was a former station on the Great Northern Railway's Nottingham to Shirebrook line.

The station should not be confused with the Butler's Hill tram stop of the Nottingham Express Transit (NET) system, which is some 250 metres (820 ft) to the south-east. The tram stop is situated on the alignment of the former Midland Railway route from Nottingham to Worksop, which is now shared between the NET and the Robin Hood railway line, but there was never a railway station at its location.

Preceding station	Disused railways	Following station
Hucknall Town	London and North Eastern Railway; Leen Valley line	Bestwood Colliery
