= Hucknall Town railway station =

Former railway station in Nottinghamshire, England

Coordinates: 53.0377°N 1.1986°W

Hucknall Town
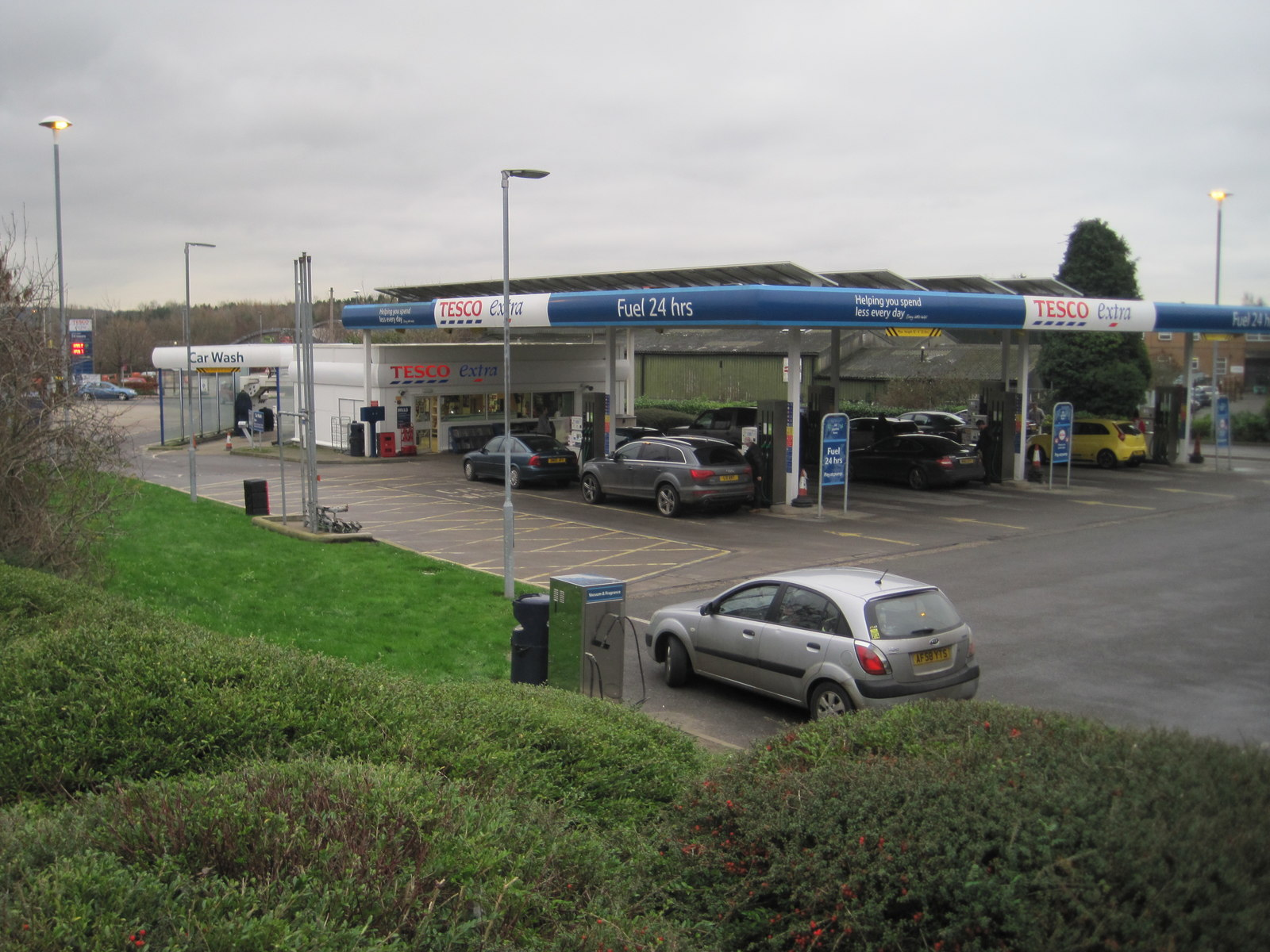

General information
- Location: Hucknall, Ashfield; England
- Grid reference: SK538492
- Platforms: 2

Other information
- Status: Disused

History
- Original company: Great Northern Railway
- Pre-grouping: Great Northern Railway
- Post-grouping: London and North Eastern Railway; London Midland Region of British Railways

Key dates
- 2 October 1882: Opened as Hucknall
- 1 July 1923: Renamed Hucknall Town
- 14 September 1931: Closed to passengers
- 3 May 1965: goods facilities withdrawn
Location

Hucknall Town railway station was on the Great Northern Railway's Nottingham to Shirebrook line. It served the market town of Hucknall in Nottinghamshire, England.

== History ==
Preceding station	Disused railways	Following station
Linby	London and North Eastern Railway; Leen Valley line	Butler's Hill

== Present day ==
No trace of the station remains. The site is now occupied by the annexed petrol station of a supermarket built on the former trackbed.
