= Langwith railway station =

Former railway station in Derbyshire, England

Coordinates: 53°13′23.89″N 1°12′43.87″W

Langwith

General information
- Location: Langwith, Bolsover; England
- Grid reference: SK 526 698
- Platforms: 2

Other information
- Status: Disused

History
- Original company: Midland Railway
- Pre-grouping: Midland Railway
- Post-grouping: London, Midland and Scottish Railway; British Railways

Key dates
- 1 June 1875: Opened
- 12 October 1964: Closed
Location

Langwith is a former railway station in the Langwith Maltings area of Langwith in northeastern Derbyshire, England.

== Context ==
The station was built by the Midland Railway on its Nottingham Midland to Worksop line. The station was designed by the Midland Railway company architect John Holloway Sanders. The line and station were closed to passengers in 1964. The line was reopened in 1998 as the Robin Hood Line but the station was not reopened, the community being better served by a wholly new structure half a mile to the North, called Langwith-Whaley Thorns. In Henry Priestley's 1962 photograph of Langwith station the colliery winding gear visible in the distance marks the approximate site of Langwith-Whaley Thorns station.

== History ==
The station was opened with some bunting, flags and ceremony on 1 June 1875. It initially provided a service of six trains each way, three between Mansfield and Worksop and three between Mansfield and Sheffield Victoria.

The line was and remains double track. The station had two opposite platforms and a stone station building very similar to those at Shirebrook West, Elmton & Creswell and Whitwell. The original Whitwell station has been dismantled and meticulously rebuilt at the Midland Railway Centre; the new Robin Hood line Whitwell station is a new building on the original site.

The last day of service was 10 October 1964, closure having been delayed for a week to serve the annual Nottingham Goose Fair. The station was demolished in 1978.

== Notes ==
Preceding station	Disused railways	Following station
Shirebrook West; Line and station open	Midland Railway; Nottingham to Worksop Line	Elmton and Creswell; Line and station open

== See also ==
- Langwith-Whaley Thorns railway station
- Shirebrook North railway station
