= Listed buildings in Langwith, Derbyshire =

Langwith is an area in the Bolsover District of Derbyshire, England. The area contains four listed buildings that are recorded in the National Heritage List for England. Of these, one is listed at Grade II*, the middle of the three grades, and the others are at Grade II, the lowest grade. The area contains a number of small settlements, including Upper Langwith, and the listed buildings consist of a church, a small country house, a cottage, and a former school and schoolmaster's house, later used as a village hall.

== Key ==
Grade	Criteria
II*	Particularly important buildings of more than special interest
II	Buildings of national importance and special interest

== Buildings ==
Name and location	Photograph	Date	Notes	Grade
Church of the Holy Cross, Upper Langwith; 53.21852°N 1.22450°W		13th century	The oldest part of the church is the chancel, the church has since been altered and extended, and in 1877–78 it was restored by Norman Shaw, who also added the bellcote. The church is built in stone and has a lead roof. It consists of a nave and a chancel in one unit, a south porch, and a north vestry. The porch is gabled with pinnacles, and has a four-centred arch and a round-arched doorway. Above it is a window, also with a four-centred arched head.	II*
The Old Hall; 53.22244°N 1.22135°W		Early 17th century	A small country house, later divided into three dwellings, it is in sandstone, and has a stone slate roof with coped gables and moulded kneelers. There are two storeys and attics, and an L-shaped plan, with ranges of two and three bays. There are two doorways with moulded architraves and bracketed segmental pediments, the windows are mullioned, and in each range are gabled dormers.	II
Rose Cottage; 53.22229°N 1.22119°W	—	17th century	A sandstone cottage that has a pantile roof with coped gables and plain kneelers. There are two storeys and three bays, and a lean-to porch on the left. Most of the windows are casements.	II
Former school and house 53.23404°N 1.20321°W		1883	The school and master's house, later a village hall, are in limestone with sandstone dressings, and have a hipped and gabled tile roof. The school has a single storey, the house has two storeys, and the front is irregular. The windows include cross windows, rectangular windows, and casements. The porch is recessed and gabled, and has a moulded four-centred arch.	II
