= Listed buildings in Nether Langwith =

Nether Langwith is a civil parish in the Bassetlaw District of Nottinghamshire, England. The parish contains twelve listed buildings that are recorded in the National Heritage List for England. All the listed buildings are designated at Grade II, the lowest of the three grades, which is applied to "buildings of national importance and special interest". The parish includes the village of Nether Langwith and the countryside to the east, and the listed buildings consist of houses, cottages, farmhouses, a public house and a war memorial.

== Buildings ==
| Name and location | Photograph | Date | Notes |
|---|---|---|---|
| West Cottage; 53.22874°N 1.19938°W | — | 17th century | The cottage probably has a timber framed core, its exterior is roughcast, and it has a pantile roof with stone coped gables and kneelers. There are two storeys and attics, two bays, a later two-storey single-bay wing to the right, and a single-storey brick rear extension. The windows are sashes with splayed lintels, and in the attic is a dormer. |
| Langwith House; 53.22846°N 1.20549°W | — | Early 18th century | A stone house with a pantile roof, hipped to the left. There are two storeys and attics, a main range of three bays, and a rear wing. The windows are a mix of casements and sashes, and there is a fixed light. Recessed to the left is a single-storey single-bay wing with a stone coped parapet. |
| Brook House Farmhouse; 53.22791°N 1.20077°W | | Late 18th century | The farmhouse is in rendered brick and stone on a chamfered plinth, and has a slate roof. There are two storeys and six bays. Projecting on the left is a lower two-storey wing, and at the rear are two wings. On the front is a porch, and sash windows with painted splayed lintels. |
| Connie Tom | — | Late 18th century | A cottage with quoins and a pantile roof. There are two storeys, four bays, and rear lean-to extensions. The doorway has a splayed lintel and a keystone, and the windows are sashes with splayed lintels. |
| Cotton Mill; 53.22587°N 1.17997°W | | Late 18th century | A stone farmhouse with a hipped pantile roof, two storeys, five bays, and lean-to extensions at the rear. The doorway is in the centre, above it is a blocked window, and the other windows are horizontally-sliding sashes. |
| Greenrigs; 53.22838°N 1.20277°W | — | Late 18th century | A stone cottage with a pantile roof, two storeys and three bays. The doorway is in the centre and the windows are casements. All the ground floor openings have segmental heads and flush lintels. |
| Langwith Mill House; 53.22692°N 1.18210°W | | Late 18th century | The former manager's house is in stone, with quoins, and a slate roof with stone coped gables. There are two storeys and attics and five bays. The central doorway has a fanlight, and the windows are sashes. To the right, and slightly projecting, is a later wing on a plinth, with two storeys and two bays, the roof hipped on the right with a parapet. |
| Stone Cottage; 53.22768°N 1.20474°W | — | Late 18th century | The cottage is in stone with quoins and a pantile roof. There are two storeys, three bays, and rear extensions. The central doorway has a flush surround, and the windows are sashes, those in the ground floor with splayed lintels. |
| The Jug and Glass Inn; 53.22852°N 1.20051°W | | Late 18th century | The public house is in stone with a pantile roof. There is a single storey with attics, four bays, and an extension to the right. The doorway has a bracketed hood, one of the windows is a mullioned and transomed casement, the others are horizontally-sliding sashes, and there is a gabled dormer breaking through the eaves. |
| Pasture Hill Farmhouse; 53.23036°N 1.18519°W | — | Early 19th century | The farmhouse is in stone, with a moulded eaves band, and a slate roof with stone coped gables and kneelers. There are two storeys and attics, a main range of three bays, and two-storey rear extensions. In the centre is a doorway, the windows are sashes, and all the openings have splayed stone lintels. |
| Langwith Lodge; 53.22961°N 1.19567°W | | 1904 | A large house designed by Louis Ambler, and later used for other purposes, it is in red brick on a plinth, with stone dressings, quoins, a cornice and a slate roof. There are two storeys and attics, eleven bays, and an H-shaped plan. The outer three bays on each side project under a pediment containing a Venetian window. The middle bay also projects under a smaller pediment containing an oeil-de-boeuf. In the centre is a porch containing a round-arched doorway with a rusticated surround, a fanlight and a segmental hood. The other windows are arched sashes, the outer bays contain three-light canted bay windows, and in the roof are four dormers with segmental pediments. |
| War memorial 53.22827°N 1.20072°W | | 1922 | The war memorial on the village green is in stone, and consists of a rough-hewn Celtic cross on a boulder-like plinth, on two steps. On the upper part of the cross shaft is a carved inverted sword of remembrance, and below it is an inscription. On the plinth are more inscriptions and the names of those lost in the two World Wars. |
