= Nether Langwith =

Coordinates: 53.22°N 1.21°W

- Village and civil parish
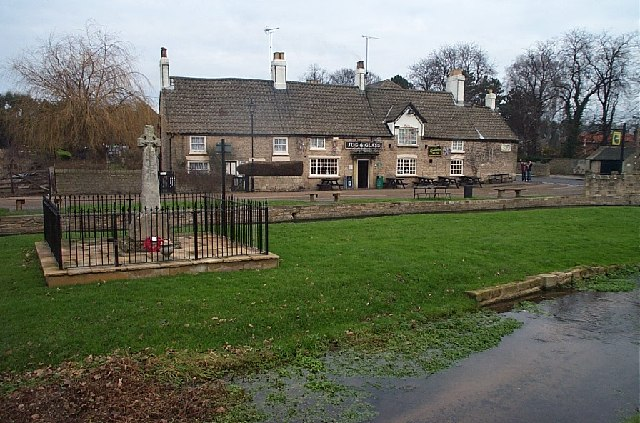
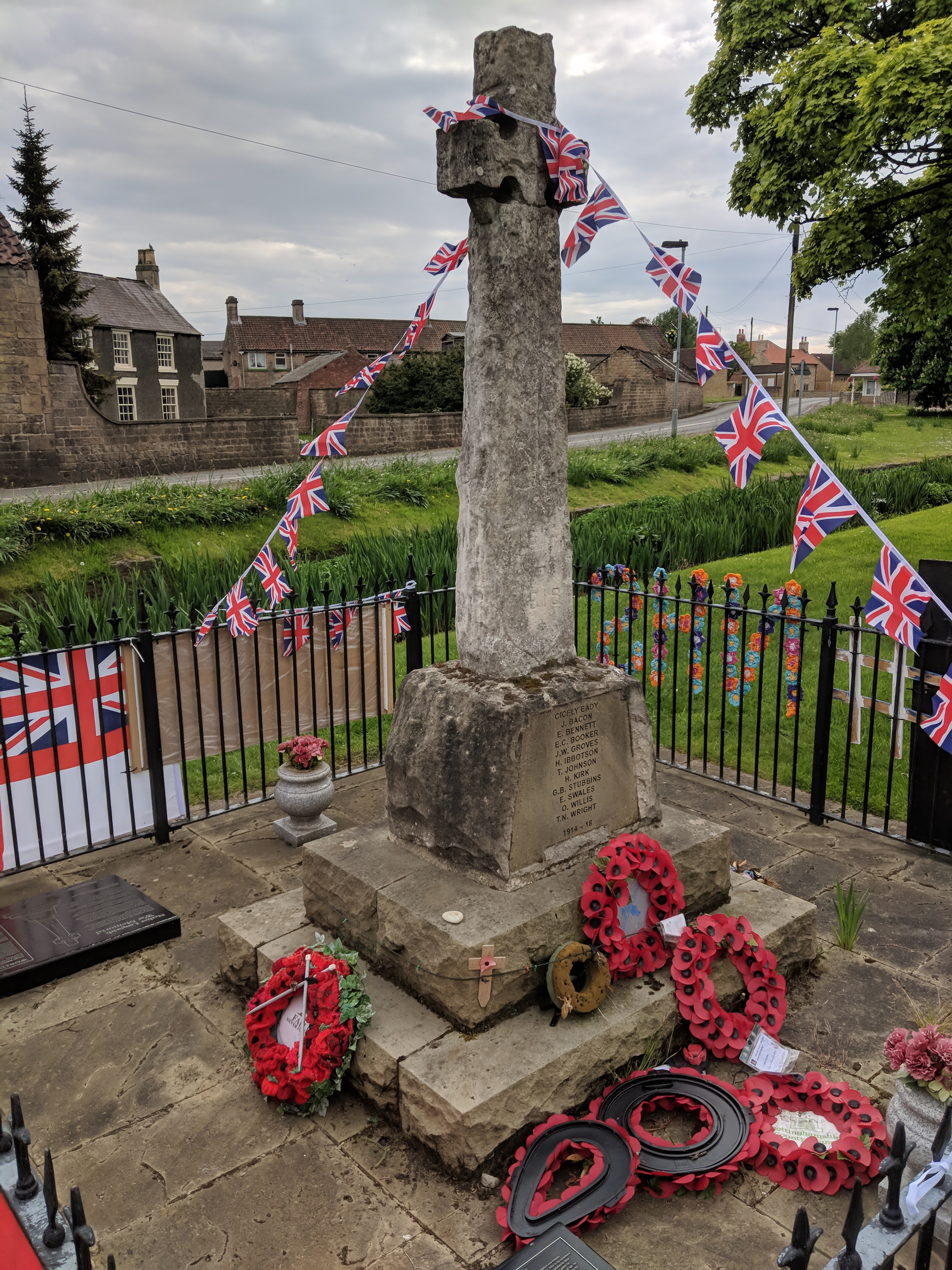
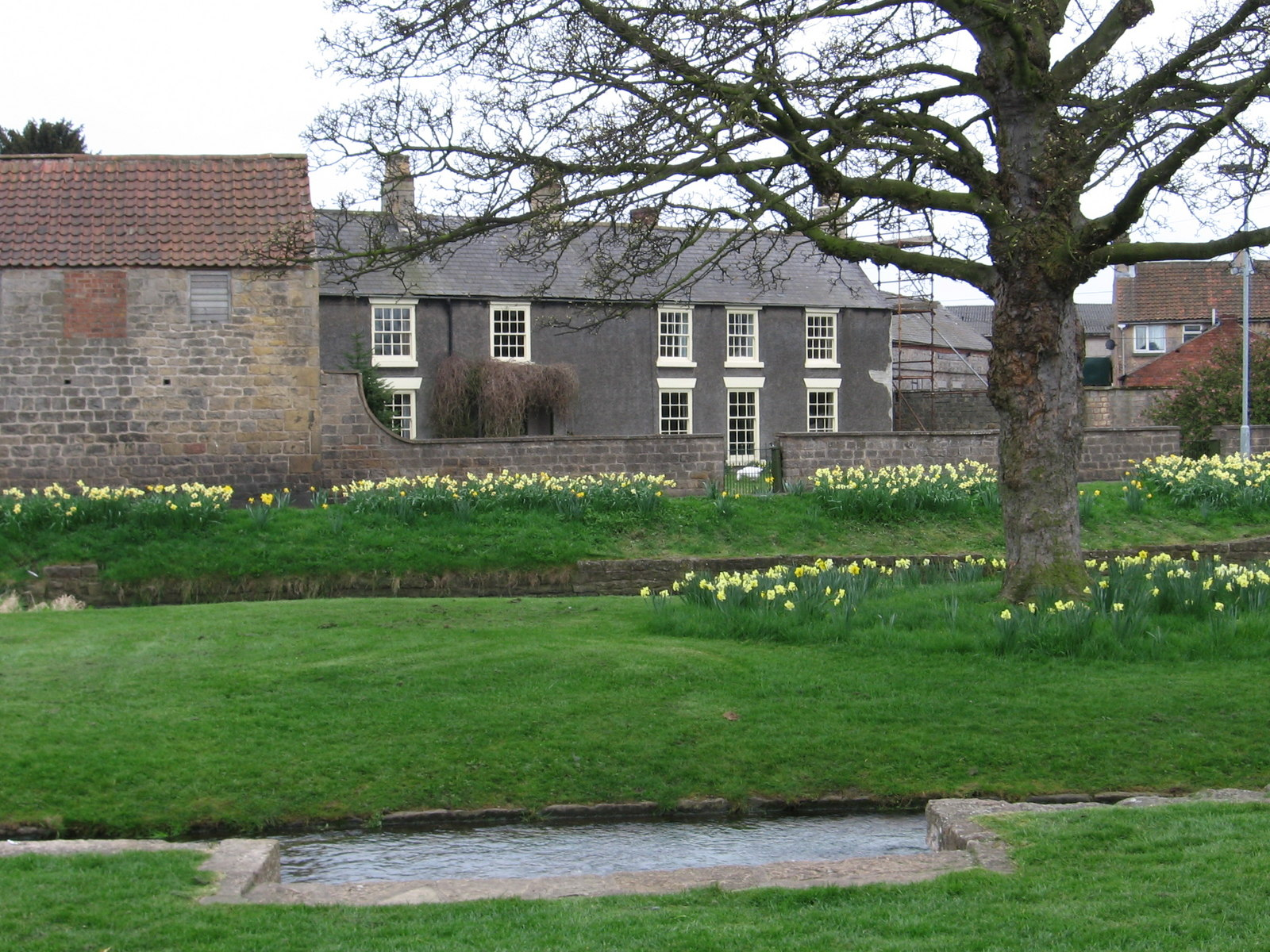
- The Jug and Glass War Memorial VE Day Brook House Farm

- Location within Nottinghamshire
- Interactive map of Nether Langwith
- Area: 2.03 sq mi (5.3 km^{2})
- Population: 478 (2021)
  - Density: 235/sq mi (91/km^{2})
- OS grid reference: SK 533705
  - London: 125 mi (201 km) SSE
- District: Bassetlaw
- Shire county: Nottinghamshire
- Region: East Midlands
- Country: England
- Sovereign state: United Kingdom
- Post town: MANSFIELD
- Postcode district: NG20
- Dialling code: 01623
- Police: Nottinghamshire
- Fire: Nottinghamshire
- Ambulance: East Midlands
- UK Parliament: Bassetlaw
- Website: nether-langwith-pc.gov.uk

Nether Langwith is a village and civil parish, in the Bassetlaw district of Nottinghamshire, England. It is located 9 miles (14 km) east of Chesterfield and 8 miles (13 km) south west of Worksop. Nether Langwith lies east of the adjoining village, Langwith, which is in the district of Bolsover in Derbyshire, England. It is 527 hectares in size and lies on the banks of the River Poulter. The population at the 2011 census was 526, decreasing to 478 in 2021.

== Geography and features ==
The local church is St Luke of Whaley Thorns, which was built in 1879 by J.B Mitchell-Withers. Whaley Thorns lies just north of Nether Langwith and 5 miles (8.0 km) of Bolsover. In 1924 it became a separate parish, but before then it was joined with the parish of Bolsover, of which St Mary's was the local church. St Luke's was a daughter church of St Mary's, of which there were three other daughter churches, St Winifred's in New Bolsover, St Peter's in Stanfree, St Laurence's at Shuttlewood. Of all of the daughter parish's, St Luke's is the only one to remain open.

Lying just east of the village is Langwith Lodge, a fine pseudo Queen Anne style stately home, now a nursing home.

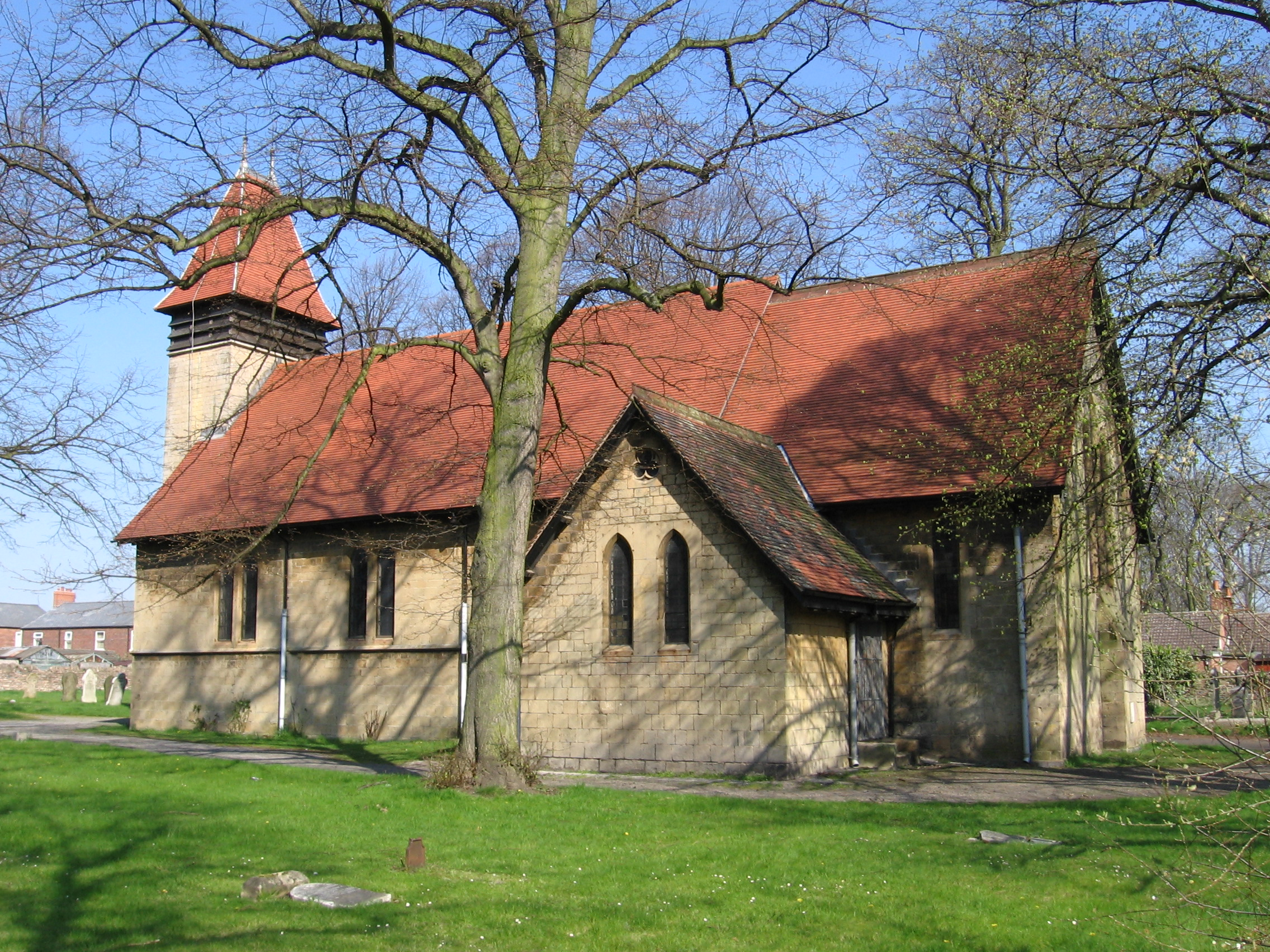
Whaley Thorns - St Lukes Church

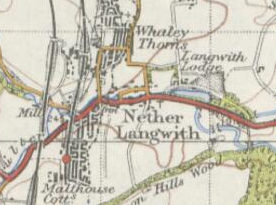
Map of Nether Langwith in 1945

== History ==
Nether Langwith was home to Major Samuel William Welfitt, who was a colonel and a landowner. Based on the 1861 Census, he lived at Langwith Lodge alongside his wife, his mother-in-law and seven servants. Langwith Lodge was formerly an occasional seat of Earl Bathurst, but nowadays is a nursing home.

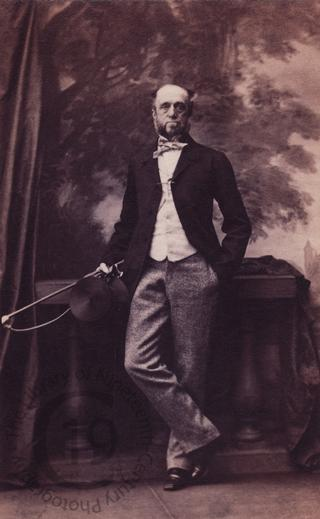
Major Samuel William Welfitt, 1861, by Camille Silvy

Major Samuel William Welfitt was the son of John Need of Blidworth near Mansfield. He was born on 2 September 1806 and died at Langwith Lodge on 25 April 1889. He was educated at Trinity College, Oxford, in 1825, and in 1826 he became a cornet in the 17th Light Dragoons. The following year, he became a lieutenant and shortly afterwards was appointed captain in the Mansfield Troop of the Sherwood Rangers in 1835. In the following years he was also appointed to major and the lieutenant-colonel-commandant by 1865. In 1879 he resigned his position of lieutenant-colonel-commandant and took the role of honorary colonel.

== Landmarks ==
=== Langwith Mill ===
One historical landmark of the village is the Langwith Mill, located to the East of the village, exactly 26 miles (42 km) from the City of Sheffield. The four-storey Cotton Mill was built in 1760, and its source of power came from the nearby River Poulter through a contoured canal from Langwith Lodge Lake. It was one of the largest mills in the district and was originally 16 windows wide. In 1848 cotton spinning was discontinued and in 1886 it was converted into a Corn Mill. Located alongside the mill was a large dam to store water, used to power the mill.

The mill was made from limestone and had a slate roof; it was in a poor state of repair and is listed on the Buildings at Risk Register. Langwith Mill House is a Grade II Listed building with Langwith Mill being a curtiledge building of the property – as well as being a building of local interest itself. It became a restaurant for a short period of time, but is now empty.

== Demography ==
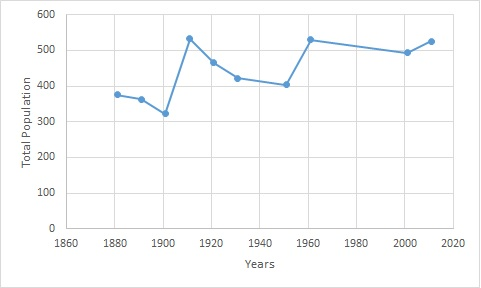
Total Population of Nether Langwith Parish, Nottinghamshire, as reported by the Census of Population from 1881–2011

In 1881, Nether Langwith had a total population of 376 people. This continued to decrease to its lowest population of 322 in 1901, but since then, the population has steadily risen to 526 by the 2011 census, but saw a fall to 478 residents for 2021.

According to the 2011 Census, the majority of the population are White British, with 75.6% being Christian. Other ethnic groups are of a very small number with 23.9% being of another religion, or of no religion. Of the total population, 498 citizens were born in England, a further 6 being born within the United Kingdom; with only 18 dwellers being of another nationality.

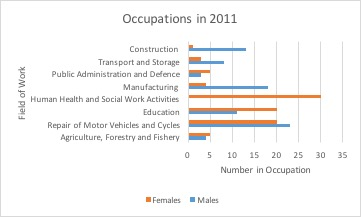
Occupations for Male and Females in Nether Langwith, based on the 2011 Census.

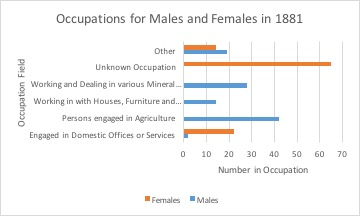
The occupational field of local population in 1881.

There was an obvious difference in the field of work between males and females in 1881. Males tended to have more physical jobs, with 38.5% of the male population working in manual labour. The majority worked within agriculture, which makes sense considering the primary surrounding areas are greenlands. Whereas for women, they were more often engaged in less physical jobs, with 14.5% of the total female population worked in domestic services. However, a large portion of the female working population (37.6%) are classed as either unemployed or their employment is unidentified.

According to the 2011 Census data, the field of work for both males and females has changed considerably throughout Nether Langwith. Nowadays, few women work in the Manufacturing or Construction industries, whilst the majority of women work in Social Services such as in Human Health or Education. Compared to Males who are considerably more involved in the Manufacturing industries, as well as repairing motor vehicles and being involved in construction industries. The 2011 Census showed a much greater and more detailed range of occupations that the dwellers of Nether Langwith are involved in.

== Education ==
Nether Langwith does not have a village school, but there are several schools in nearby villages; such as the Whaley Thorns Primary School, St Joseph's Catholic Primary School and Langwith Bassett Community Primary School.

Results from the 2011 Census show in total, 146 residents of Nether Langwith are classed as having no qualifications. However, 187 residents have qualifications as high as A levels with 80 people having a higher qualification, such as a degree; 24 residents have another form of qualification, such as vocational or foreign eligibility.

There is a small number, of 26 people, who are full-time students over the age of 16 – of which only 4 are economically active and employed.

== Health care and wellbeing ==
Information from the 2011 Census, found of the total population, 470 residents were classed to have between fair and very good health, with the remaining 56 dwellers assessed as having bad to very bad health. The majority of Nether Langwith people did not suffer from a health disability which strongly limited their daily activities – this applied to 361 citizens. However, 92 people suffered from a health problem or disability which was expected to last a minimum of 12 months and limited daily activities largely, with 73 people being affected slightly.

== See also ==
- Listed buildings in Nether Langwith
