= Whaley Thorns =

Village in Derbyshire, England

Coordinates: 53.234°N 1.204°W

- Village
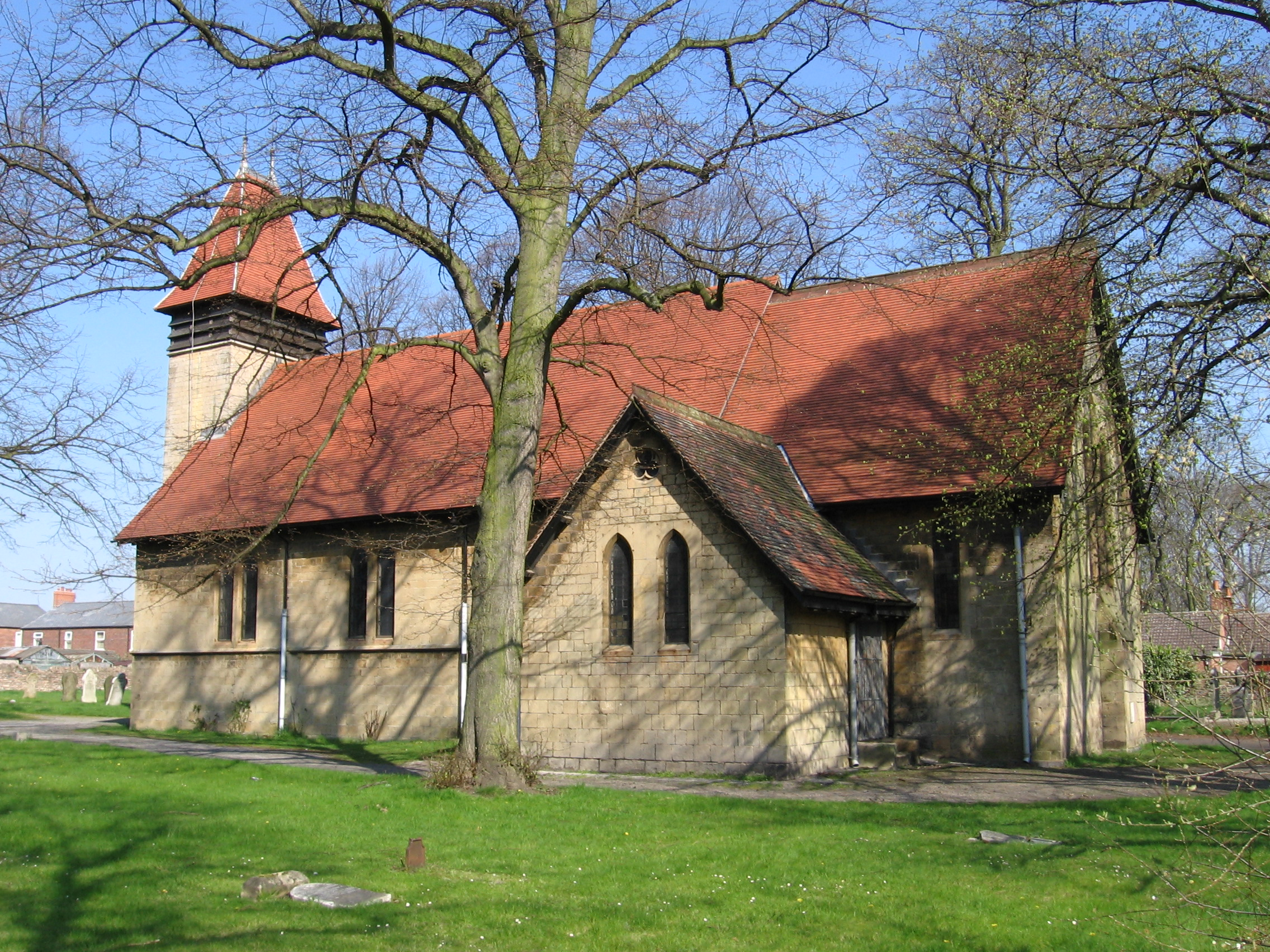
- St Lukes Church

- Location within Derbyshire
- OS grid reference: SK5370
- Civil parish: Langwith
- District: Bolsover
- Shire county: Derbyshire
- Region: East Midlands
- Country: England
- Sovereign state: United Kingdom
- Post town: MANSFIELD
- Postcode district: NG20
- Police: Derbyshire
- Fire: Derbyshire
- Ambulance: East Midlands

Whaley Thorns is a village in the Bolsover district of Derbyshire, England, close to the Nottinghamshire border. Whaley Thorns lies just north of Nether Langwith and Langwith, 1.5 miles (2.4 km) south-east of Creswell, and west of Cuckney. It is in the civil parish of Langwith.

The village takes its name from a dense wood, recorded on the first Ordnance Survey Maps. "Whaley" being Celtic for water/spring, referring to both the local springs, just to the north, and the river Poulter which lies only 200 yards (180 m) to the south. And "Thorn" an Anglo-Saxon word, for wood. So the original meaning, may have been either "Wood of the Springs", or "Wood above/between the water(s)".

In the Mid-nineteenth century, much of the wood was cut down, following the discovery of coal beneath it. Thanks to the nearby railway, the site soon grew into a colliery village. The village acquired both an Anglican Chapel and a Methodist Chapel; both still hold regular services. It also acquired a large primary school, and later on in the 1940s, another school.

In the late 1970s the chief employer, Langwith colliery, closed. Since then the first school closed and re-opened as a heritage centre and a re-education centre for ex-miners. The Second has remained open as a primary school.

Following the pit (colliery) closure the villages' population greatly declined.
