= Shirebrook South railway station =

Former railway station in Derbyshire, England

Shirebrook South
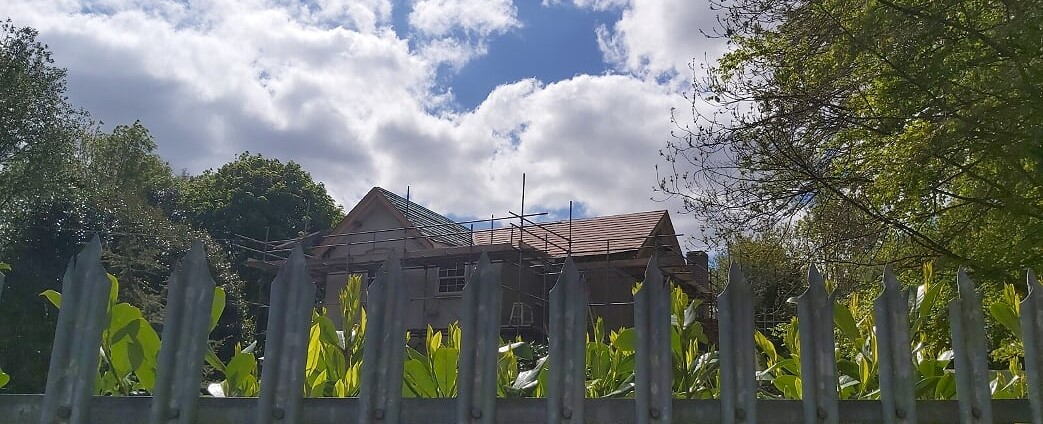

General information
- Location: Shirebrook, Bolsover; England
- Coordinates: 53.2008°N 1.2210°W
- Grid reference: SK 521 673
- Platforms: 2

Other information
- Status: Disused

History
- Original company: Great Northern Railway
- Post-grouping: LNER

Key dates
- 1 Nov 1901: Opened as "Shirebrook"
- 2 June 1924: Renamed "Shirebrook South"
- 14 Sep 1931: Closed to timetabled passenger traffic
- 4 Feb 1957: Closed to goods
- 7 October 1963: Closed completely
- 27 May 1968: Line closed completely
Location

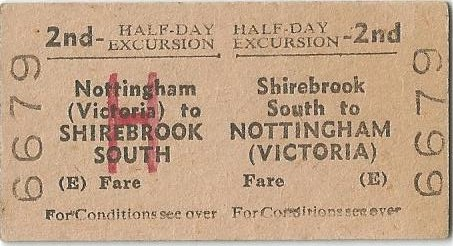

Shirebrook South is a former railway station in Shirebrook, north eastern Derbyshire, England.

== See also ==
There have been four separate stations with "Shirebrook" in their names:

- Shirebrook South which is the subject of this article
- Shirebrook North which was actually in Langwith Junction,
- Shirebrook Colliery (later renamed Shirebrook Colliery Sidings) for colliery workmen's trains only, and
- Shirebrook station which is on the Robin Hood Line.

Shirebrook South, Shirebrook Colliery Sidings and Shirebrook North have been closed for many years. Shirebrook West closed in 1964 but reopened in 1998 as plain "Shirebrook". Shirebrook West was actually on the eastern edge of the village.

== Context ==
The station was built by the GNR as part of their Leen Valley Extension which enabled trains to run from Nottingham Victoria to Shirebrook North via Sutton-in-Ashfield, Skegby, Pleasley and Shirebrook South.

Preceding station	Disused railways	Following station
Shirebrook North; Line and station closed	London and North Eastern Railway; Leen Valley Line	Pleasley East; Line and station closed

== History ==
The Leen Valley Extension started at Kirkby South Junction where it left the Great Central Main Line. It was opened northwards in stages, with passenger services as far as Skegby commencing with some fanfare on 4 April 1898. The line through Pleasley (later renamed "Pleasley East") station opened for mineral traffic as far as Shirebrook Colliery on 26 November 1900. Passenger services were extended north of Skegby to Pleasley and Shirebrook on 1 November 1901. The high embankment through the village of Shirebrook which completed the Leen Valley Extension by connecting the GNR's Shirebrook (later renamed "Shirebrook South") and the LD&ECR's Langwith Junction (later "Shirebrook North") was opened on 29 May 1901.

The passenger service then settled down to five trains per day plying between Shirebrook and Nottingham Victoria, with two extra on Wednesdays and Saturdays. There was no Sunday service. The GCR took the LD&ECR over in 1907, so after that date The Leen Valley extension joined the Great Central at both ends. Nevertheless, until 1925 local passenger trains ran North from Nottingham Victoria and terminated at Shirebrook South, despite Shirebrook North being only a mile further on. To modern eyes this appears like running trains along the East Coast Main Line from Edinburgh and terminating at Finsbury Park instead of Kings Cross. From 1925 trains started running the last mile to Shirebrook North, but the writing was already on the wall.

The railways in these parts were built primarily to carry coal. Local passenger services were typically loss-making and got in the way of freight traffic. The Shirebrook North - Shirebrook South - Nottingham Victoria service was withdrawn on 14 September 1931.

The line remained open for six purposes:

- coal
- through freight services
- local freight services
- diversions if the GCML was overloaded or under repair,
- special trains, notably for football matches and enthusiasts, and
- Summer excursions.

Shirebrook South closed for local goods on 4 February 1957.

Summer weekend excursions to places such as Skegness continued to call at Shirebrook South up to September 1964, at which point the station became redundant and closed completely.

The GCML closed North of Nottingham in September 1966, so diversions also ended, but a last hurrah was a sleeping car service from Marylebone to Glasgow which passed through Shirebrook South in the wee small hours from 1962 to 1964.

Collieries closed or rationalised production, for example Pleasley Colliery joined underground with Shirebrook Colliery and sent its coal to the surface that way. At one time coal from Shirebrook Colliery could be sent out via the Leen Valley Extension or via what is now the Robin Hood Line, that, too, was rationalised so it only went the latter way.

Through freight dwindled or went by other routes, so fewer trains passed through the Shirebrook South site.

A Stephenson Locomotive Society "Farewell" railtour traversed the line on 4 May 1968.

The line was closed on 27 May 1968 and has since been lifted. Shirebrook South station has been razed to the ground and the massive embankment between Shirebrook South and North has been removed, with striking visual impact.

== Other Reading ==
- Midland Railway System Maps (The Distance Diagrams), volume 2 - Leeds to Leicester and branches; Derby to Manchester and branches; Cheshire Lines (1909-1923 ed.). Teignmouth: Peter Kay. 1998. ISBN 978-1-899890-17-0.
