= River Poulter =

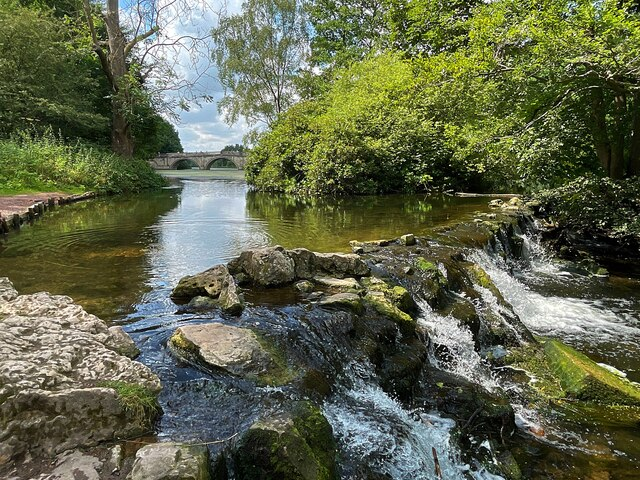
- The Weir

Location
- Country: England
- County: Nottinghamshire

Physical characteristics
- Source
  - location: Scarcliffe
- Mouth: River Idle
  - location: Elkesley

The River Poulter which rises near Scarcliffe in Derbyshire, England is a tributary river of the River Idle in Nottinghamshire. It supplied power to mills along its route, most of which are now gone, although their mill ponds remain. Cuckney mill building is used as a primary school. The river has been dammed to create several lakes in the Dukeries estates of Welbeck Abbey and Clumber House now the National Trust property of Clumber Park. The ornamental Gouldsmeadow Lake, Shrubbery Lake and Great Lake on the Welbeck estate are supplied by a tributary of the Poulter, while Carburton Forge Dam and Carburton Dam were built to power a forge and a mill. Clumber Lake, consisting of an upper and lower lake, which is spanned by a Grade II* listed ornamental bridge, is part of the Clumber estate, and has suffered from subsidence.

Beyond the parklands, the river flows eastwards past Elkesley, to join the River Idle just outside the village close to the A1 road. The river's water quality is good, with most indexes showing that it is not far from being unpolluted enabling it to support populations of fish, while the lakes provide significant habitat for large numbers of birds.

== Course ==
The Poulter rises at a spring to the south west of Scarcliffe in Derbyshire, close to the 520-foot (160 m) contour, and skirts around the southern edge of the village, before flowing in a north-easterly direction towards Nether Langwith. At the western edge of Langwith, it passes under the abandoned track of the railway which served Langwith Colliery, and skirts around a modern fish farm. Owl Sick, a stream which rises at Owl Spring in Scarcliffe Park joins it near the village, and is joined by a stream which rises near Whaley Hall Farm, and flows in a south-easterly direction through Whaley and the Poulter Country Park. The country park was the location of Langwith Colliery's waste tip. The colliery closed in 1978 and by 1987 most of the site had been cleared, although a shaft was retained to pump water from the pit into the river to keep the neighbouring Creswell Colliery drained. The waste tips were landscaped in 1988 to form the country park.

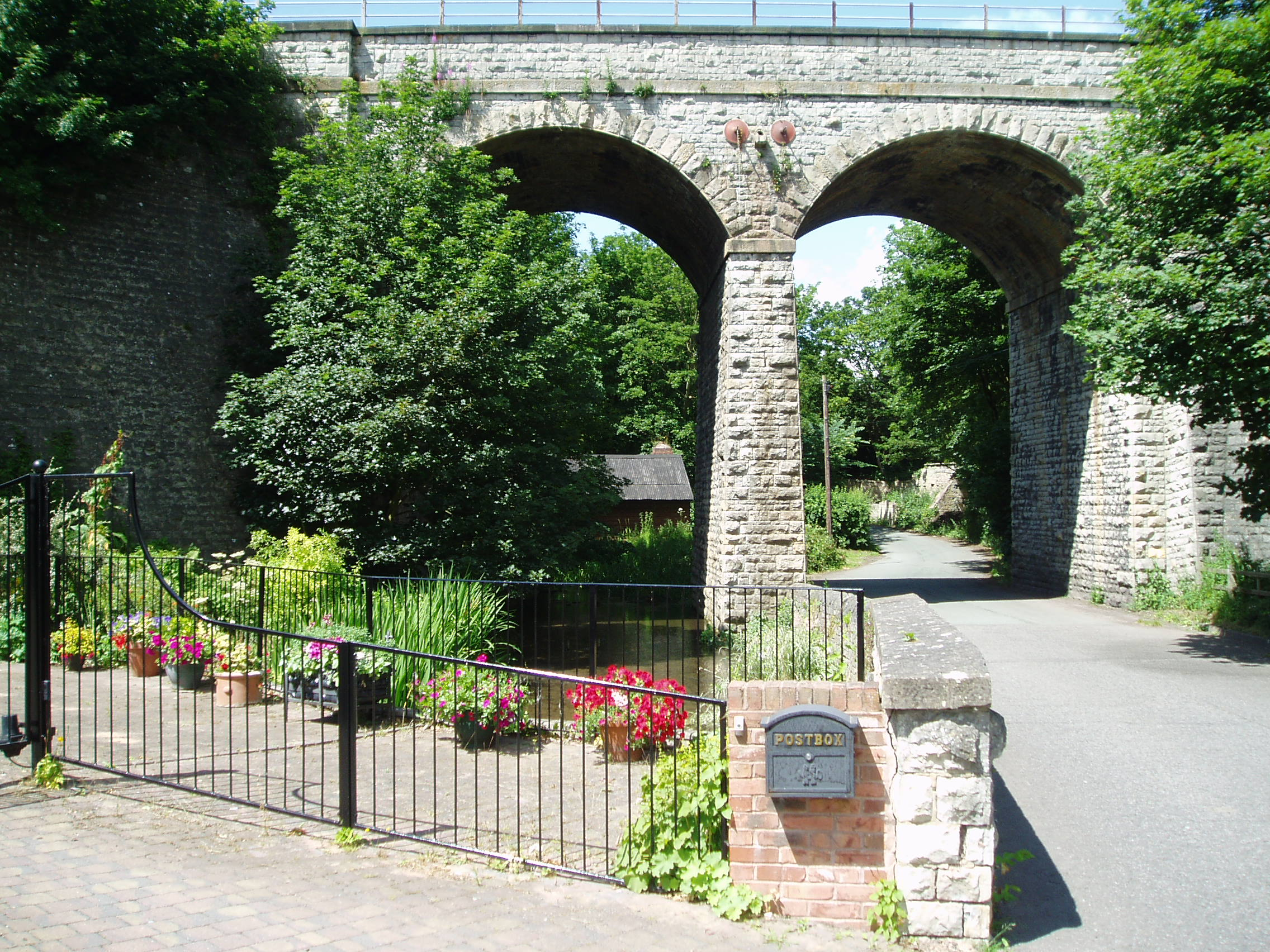
The Langwith Viaduct carries the Robin Hood Line over the river at Langwith. Through the arch is the old pumphouse, which once supplied water to Langwith Colliery.

The streams flow into the millpond which supplied Scarcliffe Mill, one of four mills known to have existed along this stretch. Records from Newstead Priory indicate there was a mill here in 1432, and it was marked on maps of the late 19th century. By 1938 the last mill was no longer in use and was demolished in the 1960s. The mill pond has become silted as a result of the poor condition of the dam and sluice, but could form a central part of a conservation area based on Apsley Grange, a large building on the opposite side of the road. Below the mill site, a small brick building once held the pumps used to regulate water levels in the river and pump water to Langwith Colliery. Next the river passes through an arch of a two-arched viaduct built in the 1870s by the Midland Railway. Although passenger traffic ceased in 1964 as part of the Beeching cuts, the line remained open for goods trains, and became part of the Robin Hood Line from Worksop to Nottingham in 1998. The other arch crosses the Whaley Thorns road, under which the river flows immediately afterwards.

Passing through Langwith, the river splits into two channels which pass either side of some houses and rejoin at an open space where a stone sign indicates it the site of a sheep dip in 1896. The first of a series of lakes, "The Lake", covering an area of 5.4 acres (2.2 ha), lies to the east of Nether Langwith, beyond which the flow is augmented by the treated output from Langwith Sewage Treatment Works.

Langwith Mill House marks the location of a cotton mill built in 1786. It had four storeys and was one of the largest of its type in the region. It closed in 1848 and was used as a corn mill from 1886. The building is in a poor state of repair, and on the Buildings at Risk Register. The mill house is a Grade II Listed building, and housed a restaurant for a time, but is now empty. Soon the river splits, the northern channel dropping down, while the southern artificial channel maintains its level as it supplied the first of two mills at Cuckney. There have been mills here for several centuries, for a cotton mill was destroyed by fire in 1792. A lake called Cuckney Dam, covering 8.2 acres (3.3 ha), provided the water to power its replacement, which ceased operation on 12 July 1844. After the machinery had been removed, the Duke of Portland turned the building into a National School. The mill is now part of Cuckney Primary School, and its weir and sluices have been retained. The drop in level of some 13 feet (4.0 m) between the mill pond and the river beyond has enabled the school to harness the river to generate electricity. Its 7 kW crossflow turbine generating a significant proportion of the energy used by the school, was funded by a grant from Powergen's Green Plan fund and a Clear Skies grant.

Flowing around the northern edge of Cuckney, the river reaches the site of a second corn mill which was situated to the east of the village. The mill has been demolished, but the sluices and weir are still visible.

=== Welbeck Lakes ===
Beyond the mill site are two channels, the western at the level of the mill pond, and the eastern at a lower level. Both channels head towards the first ornamental lake supplied by the river. At this point, the river has dropped some 360 feet (110 m) from its source. Welbeck Great Lake is part of the Welbeck estate, which was owned by the Dukes of Portland, and now owned by the Bentinck family. Millwood Brook flows into Gouldsmeadow Lake and through Shrubbery Lake, before joining the Great Lake. In the 1760s, the duke employed the architect and civil engineer Robert Mylne to construct a three-arched bridge, which had to be both functional and beautiful. Mylne experienced problems with the piers moving, which resulted in the central 90-foot (27 m) arch collapsing in February 1768, after which Mylne was sacked. In the 1840s, the fifth duke, who built an underground ballroom and tunnels on the estate, employed the engineer William Tierney Clark to construct a suspension bridge. The resident engineer for the project was Bland William Croker, who had assisted Clark with the construction of the Szechenyi suspension bridge in Budapest. The western channel of the Poulter flows through a culvert into the Great Lake, while the lower eastern channel flows through a culvert into Carburton Forge Dam.

Beyond the lake, a weir with a track over it drops the level to Carburton Forge Dam, built to provide power for a forge. In 1695 10 acres (4.0 ha) of land were leased to John Wheeler of Worcester by the duke, on which he built the forge, a dam pool and floodgates. Deeds held by the Nottinghamshire Archive Service record an agreement between Wheeler and the duke to pay compensation annually as a result of the stream supplying the forge flooding the duke's land. The forge flourished until the 1770s. A writer called Pococke described how "the pigs [of iron] were brought from Derbyshire to be melted into bars for use" in 1751. The fifth duke removed all traces of the forge. Beyond Carburton Forge Dam, another weir drops the level to Carburton Dam. A "water corn mill, walke mill or fulling mill" was mentioned in a lease agreement in 1678. The five Welbeck lakes cover an area of 151 acres (61 ha).

Again there are two channels below the lake, with the main southern channel at a lower level than the northern one, which is called the Flood Dyke. Both cross under the B6034 Worksop to Ollerton road, and leave the Welbeck estate. The land between the two channels is sandy, and the Flood Dyke was used to irrigate the area, forming water meadows. Restoration of the historic structures was undertaken by the County Council in 2010/11, and interpretation boards have been erected to enable visitors to understand the process. Following an archaeological survey, restoration work was carried out on the main sluice in the Flood Dyke, and on a number of stone sluices, wooden hatches and cast iron valves, the latter dating from the 19th century.

=== Clumber Lake ===
Both channels pass under the road which serves the hamlet of Carburton, where the upper channel, Flood Dyke, ends in a field from where it enters a sluice and flows through a culvert into an open section. Water enters a second sluice and culvert and rejoins the lower channel. The upper sluice is marked "sluices" on the 1898 map, and fed a large fish pond to the east of the channel. The fish pond was disused by 1919, when it was marked as swampy ground. The lower channel flowed past the "Wheel House (pumping station)" in 1898. It continues under Carburton bridge to supply Clumber Lake, part of the Clumber estate of the Dukes of Newcastle, which has been owned by the National Trust since 1945. The Clumber estate was described in the 18th century as "A black heath full of rabbits, having a narrow river running through it, with a small boggy close or two." In 1772, the second Duke of Newcastle started construction of Clumber Lake, to complement his new house. A dam was built at the bottom end of the estate, the river bed was excavated to create a wide expanse of water, and an ornamental bridge was erected at the western end. The project took 15 years to complete, and cost £6,612. The bridge, which consists of three unequal arches with balustrading along the top, was designed by Stephen Wright, and is 230 feet (70 m) long. It is a Grade II* listed structure.

Improvements to the lake were carried out in 1786 under the direction of Mr Marson the estate manager. The 4th Duke of Newcastle built a cascade below the bridge in 1823, and a new one in 1835, when the work was completed by Mr Grey. The duke described the construction as "ingenious and well managed." There were problems in 1842, when the culvert feeding water from the lake to an engine which supplied water to the house was found to be clogged with fine tree roots. In spring 1845, 1846 and 1847, the duke drained the lake to make it wider and to improve the banks, which he felt looked "neither natural nor handsome" in places.

Below the ornamental bridge, a weir drops the level by around 3.3 feet (1.0 m). In Victorian times, the park had two independent water supply systems, one supplying the house and its associated buildings, and the other supplying the farm and Hardwick village. About 500 people lived on the estate at the time. The house supply came from an artesian well, and was pumped to an underground reservoir, which held 60,000 imperial gallons (270 m^{3}), from where it travelled 0.5 miles (0.80 km) by gravity. The difference in levels of the two parts of the lake was sufficient to power a Gilbert Gilkes and Gordon turbine, which drove the pump. The two systems became one in 1931, when a treble ram vertical pump was installed, driven by the existing turbine. Pumping is now done by electric pumps, but the original machinery is still in place, and was for a number of years used to supply the park with water if there was a power cut.

The lake covering some 79 acres (32 ha) has been affected by subsidence caused by coal mining, and UK Coal funded remedial work in the 1980s and in 2004. The lowering of the water level during this work revealed the charred remains of the Lincoln, a one-third scale naval frigate which the Duke bought in 1871, and which was destroyed by fire in the 1940s. The river leaves the lake by a weir and cascade near Hardwick village, beyond which there is a ford, and another weir beyond that drops the level again, before the river passes under West Bridge on the A614 Worksop to Ollerton road. Most of the rest of the route is through woodland, in the middle of which a ford crosses the river near Crookford farm. The river is crossed by the B6387 Ollerton to Gamston road, and the A1 road near Gamston Airport, before joining the River Idle just downstream of the point where the River Maun and River Meden meet and the Idle begins.

== Hydrology ==
The source of the Poulter is in a region where the underlying geology is an extensive water-bearing porous rock structure called the Magnesian Limestone aquifer. Magnesian limestone is named because if contains quantities of the mineral Dolomite, which is rich in Magnesium. Where this rock reaches the surface, springs often occur, and the Poulter starts at such a spring. Further to the east, the Magnesian Limestone is covered by a layer of porous rock called the Triassic Sherwood Sandstone aquifer, which is the major geological component of the area. Continuing eastwards, both are covered by a layer of Mercia mudstone. The groundwater levels in these aquifers affect whether they supply water to the river system, or take water from it, and levels are lower than they have historically been, as a result of the extraction of groundwater, particularly for public water supply, and by fracturing of the aquifers as a result of subsidence caused by deep coal mining.

Above Cuckney, where the Environment Agency have a gauging station which records flows in the river, the catchment for the River Poulter covers some 12 square miles (31 km^{2}), which has an average annual rainfall of 24 inches (610 mm) (based on figures from 1961 to 1990). About a third of this finds its way into the river. Water quality is good. The Environment Agency use a six-stage rating scale, from 'A' to 'F', the General Quality Assessment, to classify rivers. 'A' on the GQA is the best quality of water, while 'F' is the poorest. Factors which affect the quality are levels of ammonia, levels of dissolved oxygen and the Biochemical oxygen demand (BOD), which measures the amount of dissolved oxygen needed by organisms to break down organic matter in the water. These factors are generally worse when the water is discharged from sewage treatment processes, and tend to be worse in summer, when such discharges make up a greater proportion of the total flow in the river. The upper Poulter, above Welbeck Lake, is rated at 'B' on the GQA scale, despite the fact that the flows are augmented by the outflow from Langwith Sewage Treatment Works, which contributes around 1.2 Ml/d (megalitres per day) and by water from Langwith fish farm, which can be up to 0.9 Ml/d, but which is seasonal in nature.

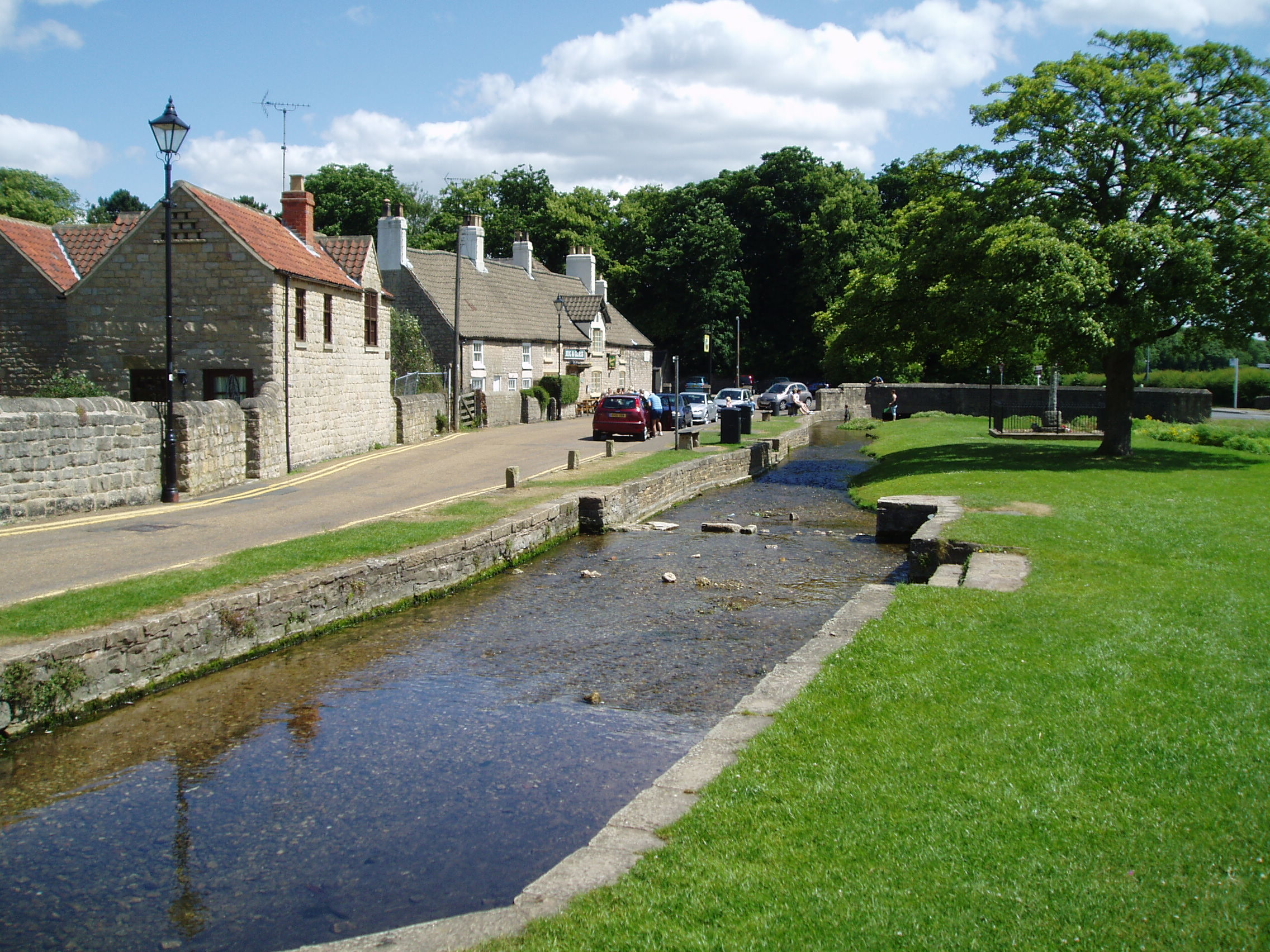
The river at Langwith

Water quality remains good through the length of the river. Figures for the final section before it joins the River Idle show that the levels of ammonia and dissolved oxygen are those which would be expected in a natural ecosystem. Between 1991 and 2006, the BOD has been reduced by more than 50 per cent, but there is still room for improvement. Levels of phosphates and nitrates, which are affected by agricultural activity, are quite high, but some improvements have occurred. Water quality is also measured by two biological indexes. These are NTAXA, which relates to the total number of invertebrate species found in samples of the water, and ASPT, (the Average Score Per Taxon), calculated from the numbers of specific invertebrates which are graded according to their sensitivity to organic pollution. The assessment for the years 2004 to 2006 rated the final section as grade A (very good) on the first index, and grade B (good) on the second. This indicates that the water is not far short from unpolluted.

The Environment Agency has since changed the system for assessing water quality in the river systems in England. Each is given an overall ecological status, which may be one of five levels: high, good, moderate, poor and bad. There are several components that are used to determine this, including biological status, which looks at the quantity and varieties of invertebrates, angiosperms and fish. Chemical status, which compares the concentrations of various chemicals against known safe concentrations, is rated good or fail.

The water quality of the Poulter was as follows in 2019.

Section	Ecological Status	Chemical Status	Length	Catchment
Poulter from Source to Millwood Brook	Moderate	Fail	7.7 miles (12.4 km)	13.29 square miles (34.4 km^{2})
Millwood Brook Catchment (trib of Poulter)	Poor	Fail	9.5 miles (15.3 km)	17.61 square miles (45.6 km^{2})
Poulter from Millwood Brook to Maun	Poor	Fail	9.4 miles (15.1 km)	17.24 square miles (44.7 km^{2})

The quality of the Millwood Brook has improved, as it was rated bad for ecological status in 2009. Like most rivers in the UK, the chemical status changed from good to fail in 2019, due to the presence of polybrominated diphenyl ethers (PBDE) and mercury compounds, neither of which had previously been included in the assessment.

== Flora and fauna ==
The river's upper reaches are diverse in terms of their physical nature and their ecological importance. They include an area of wet woodland providing a rich habitat for many species. Water quality is sufficient to support various fish species. The river above Welbeck Lake provides habitat for a significant population of wild brown trout. The size of the lakes results in water moving much more slowly and supports populations of cyprinids, pike and eels, which thrive in water which is relatively static. The lower reaches of the river are used for spawning by fish which inhabit the River Idle.

The lakes provide habitat for large numbers of birds. Clumber lake is fringed by alder, sallow and ash trees, with some sedge marsh. It was one of the first sites in the country used by gadwall for breeding, and also has a winter population of goosander. Hobbys frequent the reed bed below Clumber Dam in August and September, where they hunt swallows and martins. The upper lake is fringed by oak, yew, beech and Scots pine trees, and provides habitat for willow tits and woodpeckers, with blackcaps visiting in the summer. Mandarin ducks also visit occasionally.

== Points of Interest ==
Point	Coordinates (Links to map resources)	OS Grid Ref	Notes
Source	53.2097°N 1.2705°W	SK488683	Spring near Scarcliffe
Langwith Viaduct	53.2268°N 1.2113°W	SK527702	site of Scarcliffe mill
Langwith mill	53.2274°N 1.1821°W	SK547703	
Cuckney School	53.2332°N 1.1621°W	SK560710	Former mill
Welbeck Great Lake	53.2455°N 1.1303°W	SK581724	weir
Carburton Dam	53.2458°N 1.1017°W	SK600724	sluice
Clumber bridge	53.2578°N 1.0708°W	SK620738	
Hardwick ford	53.2698°N 1.0396°W	SK641751	
Crookford	53.2697°N 0.9946°W	SK671752	
Mouth	53.2710°N 0.9505°W	SK700754	Jn with River Idle

== Bibliography ==
- Cross-Rudkin, Peter; et al. (2008). A Biographical Dictionary of Civil Engineers in Great Britain and Ireland: Vol 2: 1830 to 1890. Thomas Telford. ISBN 978-0-7277-3504-1.
- CAMS (2006). The Idle and Torne Catchment Abstraction Management Strategy (PDF). Environment Agency. Archived from the original (PDF) on 15 January 2018.
- Firth, J. B. (1916). "Highways and Byways in Nottinghamshire". Macmillan.
- Fletcher, John, ed. (2001). Where Truth Abides - Diaries of the 4th Duke of Newcastle-under-Lyme (1822-1850). Country Books (for the National Trust). ISBN 1-898941-57-2.
- Innes-Smith, Robert (1984). The Dukeries and Sherwood Forest. English Life Publications Ltd. ISBN 0-85101-203-5.
- Notts Archives (2012). "Portland of Welbeck: Deeds and Estate Papers". Nottinghamshire Archives. Archived from the original on 16 October 2012.
- Skempton, Sir Alec; et al. (2002). A Biographical Dictionary of Civil Engineers in Great Britain and Ireland: Vol 1: 1500 to 1830. Thomas Telford. ISBN 0-7277-2939-X.
