= Pleasley East railway station =

Former railway station in Derbyshire, England

Coordinates: 53°10′30.68″N 1°15′6.94″W

Pleasley East
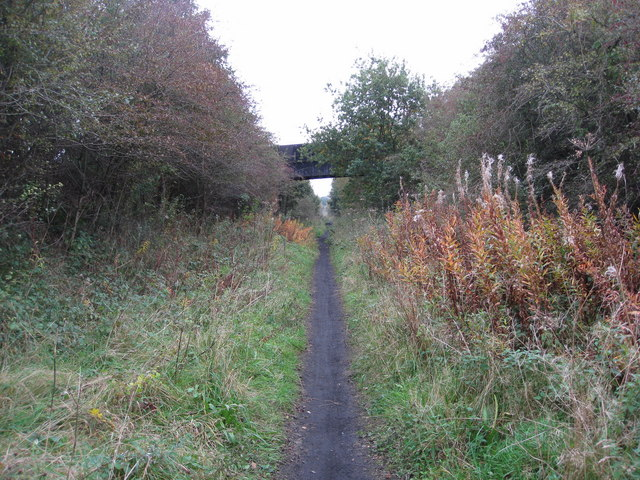

General information
- Location: Pleasley, Bolsover; England
- Grid reference: SK 500 645
- Platforms: 2

Other information
- Status: Disused

History
- Original company: Great Northern Railway
- Post-grouping: LNER

Key dates
- 1 Nov 1901: Opened as "Pleasley"
- 14 Sep 1931: Closed to timetabled passenger traffic
- 1950: Renamed "Pleasley East"
- 2 Oct 1963: Closed to goods
- 7 October 1963: station closed completely
- 27 May 1968: Line closed completely
Location

Pleasley East is a former railway station in Pleasley, Derbyshire, England on the Nottinghamshire border near Mansfield.

== Context ==
The station was built by the Great Northern Railway (GNR) as part of their Leen Valley Extension which enabled trains to run from Nottingham Victoria to Shirebrook North via Sutton-in-Ashfield Town, Skegby for Stanton Hill, Pleasley East and Shirebrook South.

Preceding station	Disused railways	Following station
Shirebrook South	London and North Eastern Railway; Leen Valley Line	Skegby

== History ==
The Leen Valley Extension started at Kirkby South Junction where it left the Great Central Main Line. It was opened northwards in stages, with passenger services as far as Skegby commencing with some fanfare on 4 April 1898. The line through Pleasley station opened for mineral traffic as far as Shirebrook Colliery on 26 November 1900. Passenger services were extended north of Skegby to Pleasley and Shirebrook (later renamed "Shirebrook South") on 1 November 1901. The high embankment through the village of Shirebrook which completed the Leen Valley Extension by connecting the GNR's Shirebrook (later "Shirebrook South") and the LD&ECR's Langwith Junction (later "Shirebrook North") was opened on 29 May 1901.

The passenger service then settled down to five trains per day plying between Shirebrook (later Shirebrook South) and Nottingham Victoria, with two extra on Wednesdays and Saturdays. There was no Sunday service. The GCR took the LD&ECR over in 1907, so after that date The Leen Valley extension joined the Great Central at both ends. Nevertheless, at least until 1922 local passenger trains ran North from Nottingham Victoria and terminated at Shirebrook (later Shirebrook South), despite Shirebrook North being only a mile further on. To modern eyes this appears like running trains along the East Coast Main Line from Edinburgh, terminating at Finsbury Park instead of Kings Cross. It is probably explained by the fact that services from Sheffield Midland via Spinkhill and Langwith Junction (Shirebrook North) continued to the Midland Railway station at Mansfield, giving an onward connection to Nottingham Midland. From 1925 trains started running the last mile to Shirebrook North, but the writing was already on the wall.

The railways in these parts were built primarily to carry coal. Local passenger services were typically loss-making and got in the way of freight traffic. The Shirebrook North - Shirebrook South - Nottingham Victoria service was withdrawn on 14 September 1931.

The line remained open for six purposes:

- coal
- through freight services
- local freight services
- diversions if the GCML was overloaded or under repair,
- special trains, notably for football matches(see below) and enthusiasts, and
- Summer excursions.

Pleasley East closed for local goods on 2 October 1963.

Summer weekend excursions to places such as Skegness continued to call at Pleasley East until October 1963. At which point the station became redundant and closed completely.

The GCML closed North of Nottingham in September 1966, so diversions also ended, but a last hurrah was a sleeping car service from Marylebone to Glasgow which passed through from 1962 to 1964.

Collieries closed or rationalised production, for example Pleasley Colliery joined underground with Shirebrook Colliery and sent its coal to the surface that way.

Through freight dwindled or went by other routes, so fewer trains passed through the Pleasley East site.

A Stephenson Locomotive Society "Farewell" railtour traversed the line on 4 May 1968.

The line was closed on 27 May 1968 and has since been lifted. Pleasley East station has been razed to the ground.

Parts of the trackbed and those of neighbouring lines have been turned into public footpaths and bridleways.

== Other Reading ==
- Midland Railway System Maps (The Distance Diagrams), volume 2 - Leeds to Leicester and branches; Derby to Manchester and branches; Cheshire Lines (1909-1923 ed.). Teignmouth: Peter Kay. 1998. ISBN 1-899890-17-3.
