= Langwith, Derbyshire =

Collection of villages in Derbyshire, England

Coordinates: 53°13′N 1°14′W

Langwith
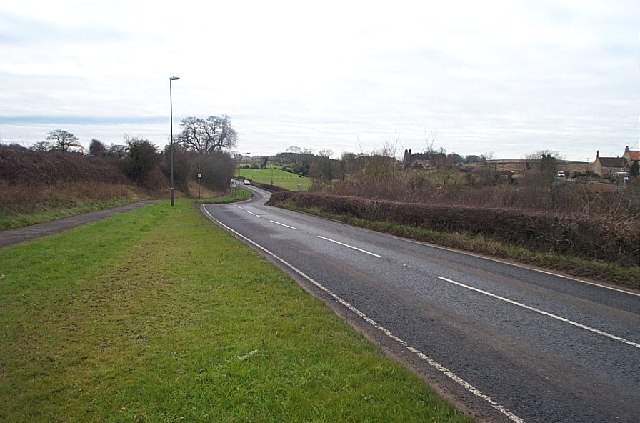
- A632 road in Langwith

- Location within Derbyshire
- Population: 3,719 (2021 census)
- Civil parish: Langwith
- District: Bolsover
- Shire county: Derbyshire
- Region: East Midlands
- Country: England
- Sovereign state: United Kingdom
- Post town: MANSFIELD
- Postcode district: NG20
- Police: Derbyshire
- Fire: Derbyshire
- Ambulance: East Midlands

Langwith is a close group of six villages crossing the Derbyshire–Nottinghamshire border, on the River Poulter about 2 miles (3.2 km) from Warsop, and about 4 miles (6.4 km) from Bolsover on the A632 road, south of Whaley Thorns. The parish was created from part of Scarcliffe parish in 2015. In 2021 the parish had a population of 3719.

These consist of Langwith, Langwith Maltings, Nether Langwith, Upper Langwith, Langwith Bassett and Langwith Junction.

== Villages synopsis ==
Langwith lies just west in the district of Bolsover, Derbyshire, from Nether Langwith; in fact the two villages adjoin. Apart from a row of shops and houses wedged between the North side of the A632 and the river Poulter, the villages have two public houses: the Gate Hotel and the Jug and Glass. The entire village is not a post-Second World War council estate.

Langwith Maltings This part of the village is separated from Langwith and Nether Langwith by a railway: the Doncaster-Nottingham line known today as the Robin Hood line. The village was first established following the opening of a railway station here, which was the only to serve this community of villages. This closed as part of the Dr Beeching closures of the 1960s. In the 1950s, the site next to the railway station was developed into a council estate, referred to as Dale Close. The Robin Hood line reopened the original with services between Nottingham and Worksop..

Etymology for Langwith see Nether Langwith, "Maltings", refers to the Malt House which existed here in operation, up until its closure and subsequent demolition in 1993.

Nether Langwith

Etymology "Nether" is Saxon/Old German for Lower, "Lang" meaning long, and "with" is Old Norse vīōr wood

Upper Langwith is a small village straddling the A632, at a fork for Langwith Junction and Bolsover, in Bolsover (district). The village is home to the Devonshire Arms pub, a mediaeval parish church and two manor houses.

== Langwith Museum ==
In 2006, a Heritage lottery funded project refurbished the old Methodist chapel in Whaley Thorns to accommodate a museum to display the history of Langwith. It is mainly run by historian Tony Warrener and a group of volunteers. He is also a governor of Langwith Whaley Thorns Primary School and Shirebrook Comprehensive School. Tony has released an updated version of his book about the history of Langwith that he started many years ago.

In 2011, the Heritage Centre left the Methodist Chapel and moved to North Street Whaley Thorns. The location is opposite the Long Willows which was the Institute and on the path leading to the train station (Robin Hood line).

== Rhubarb Farm ==
Langwith has a horticultural social enterprise, Rhubarb Farm CIC, located on a two acre site at Hardwick Street, off Devonshire Drive. Started in January 2011, it supports vulnerable people with a variety of needs and abilities. It grows fruit and vegetables for a small customer-base of local farm shops, weekly veg bag customers and people coming to buy from site. Its main focus is supporting people to change their lives for the better through gaining confidence, skills, inspiration, new knowledge and motivation. The Farm supports people with physical and mental health issues, physical and learning disabilities, ex-offenders, recovering substance misusers and older people, including those with dementia. Its food work, delivering food bags and cooked meals, also supports people in food poverty and isolated people in Langwith and surrounding towns and villages.

A Langwith Community Show was held at Rhubarb Farm site.

== Notable people ==
- Mason Bennett, professional footballer who plays as a forward with Harrogate Town.
- Ken Wagstaff, footballer voted "Player of the Century" in 2000 for both Mansfield Town and Hull City football clubs.
- John Groves, footballer who played for Luton Town in the 1959 FA Cup Final.

== See also ==
- Listed buildings in Langwith, Derbyshire
