= Shirebrook railway station =

Railway station in Derbyshire, England

Shirebrook
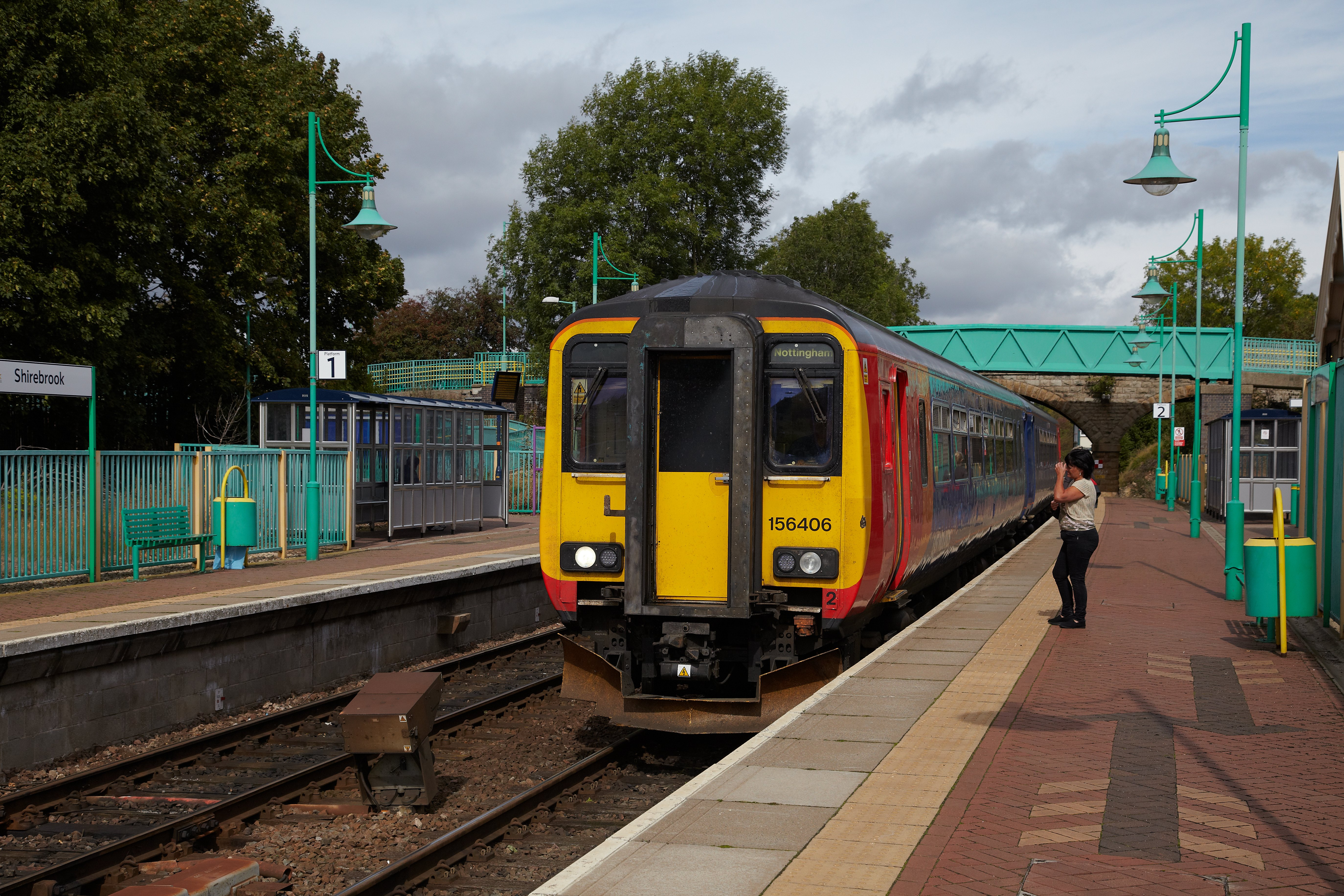
- Shirebrook railway station in 2011.

General information
- Location: Shirebrook, Bolsover; England
- Coordinates: 53°12′14.9″N 1°12′9.4″W
- Grid reference: SK533677
- Manager: East Midlands Railway
- Platforms: 2

Other information
- Station code: SHB
- Classification: DfT category F1

History
- Original company: Midland Railway
- Pre-grouping: Midland Railway
- Post-grouping: London, Midland and Scottish Railway

Key dates
- 1 June 1875: Opened as Shirebrook
- 18 June 1951: Renamed Shirebrook West
- 12 October 1964: Closed
- 25 May 1998: Reopened as Shirebrook

Passengers
- 2020/21: ▼26,842
- 2021/22: ▲64,744
- 2022/23: ▲77,094
- 2023/24: ▼75,160
- 2024/25: ▼75,060
Location
Notes
- Passenger statistics from the Office of Rail and Road

Shirebrook railway station serves the town of Shirebrook in Derbyshire, England. The station is on the Robin Hood Line, 21½ miles (35 km) north of Nottingham towards Worksop.

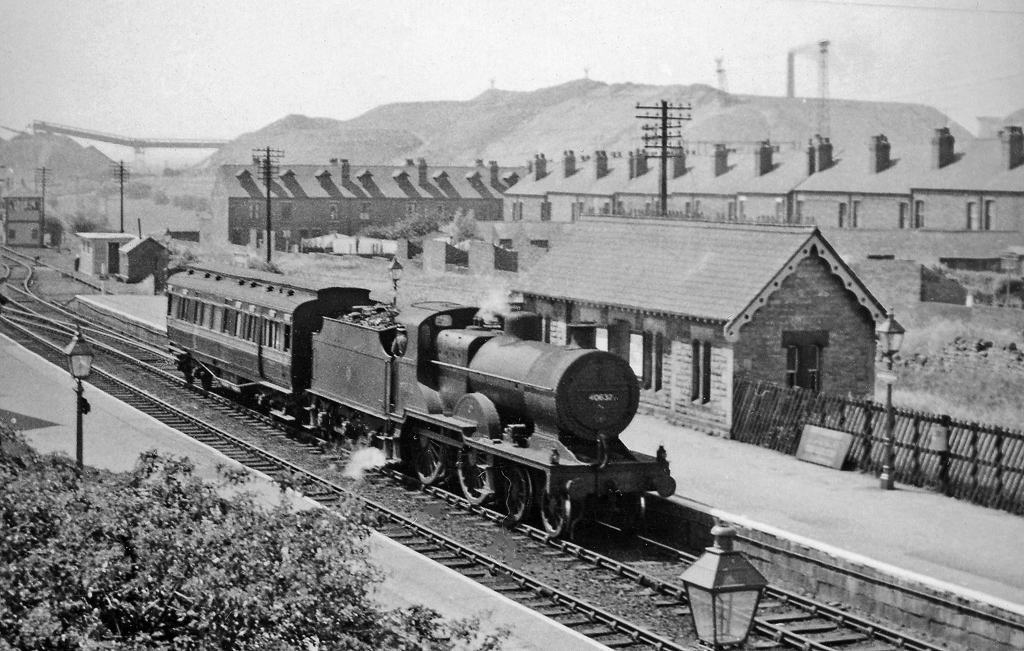
Shirebrook West Station in 1957

== History ==
The line and the station were built by the Midland Railway. It was opened for goods traffic in April 1875 and for passenger traffic on 1 June 1875 when the Midland Railway built a 15 miles (24 km) branch line from Mansfield to Worksop. The station was designed by the Midland Railway company architect John Holloway Sanders.

In 1951, the station was renamed "Shirebrook West" despite being on the eastern edge of the village. This was to "avoid confusion" with three other stations:

- Shirebrook North built by the LD&ECR in 1897. Despite its name, Shirebrook North was not actually in Shirebrook, but in nearby Langwith Junction.
- Shirebrook South built by the GNR on their line from Langwith Junction to Nottingham Victoria via Pleasley East. This line used to pass through the middle of Shirebrook by a massive embankment, cutting the village in two. Shirebrook South actually was in southern Shirebrook.
- Shirebrook Colliery (later renamed Shirebrook Colliery Sidings) for colliery workmen's trains only.

Shirebrook South closed to regular passenger services in 1931, but excursions continued to call at least until 1957. Shirebrook North closed to regular passenger services in 1955, but excursions continued to call until 1964. Shirebrook Colliery Sidings closed by June 1954.

== Branch lines ==
Two branch lines are plainly visible veering off north of the bridge at the north end of Shirebrook station.

The double tracks branching off eastwards (i.e. to the right as viewed from the station) to the side of the signalbox joined the LD&ECR's one-time main line to Lincoln, next stop Warsop. After regular passenger services ceased it did, however, carry Summer holiday trains such as the Summer Saturdays Radford to Skegness in at least 1963. The branch's main purpose was always freight traffic, with coal being overwhelmingly dominant.

In 2013 the line gives access to UK Coal's Thoresby Colliery and to the High Marnham Test Track.

There is some hope of reopening the line as a branch off the Robin Hood Line and reopening Warsop, Edwinstowe and Ollerton stations, providing an hourly service to Mansfield and Nottingham.

The single line veering off westwards (to the left as viewed from the station) was removed in the 1940s and relaid in 1974. It used to have a matching second track coming down on the other side of the main lines, behind the signalbox as viewed from the station, but that was not reinstated.

The reinstated single line serves W H Davis's wagon works in Langwith Junction. From 1900 to 1939 the pair of lines enabled trains to run from Sheffield through Spinkhill, Clowne South, Creswell's old "Top Station" (Creswell and Welbeck), Shirebrook North, Shirebrook West, and Mansfield Woodhouse to Mansfield.

Finally, up to 1974 the next station north from Shirebrook on what is now the Robin Hood Line was not Langwith-Whaley Thorns but simply "Langwith". That station was at Langwith Maltings. In the 1964-1998 closure period it was demolished. As a new station would have to be built at Langwith when the Robin Hood Line was to be reopened it was decided that the community would be better served by a station at Nether Langwith/Whaley Thorns than at the old station site.

== Services ==
All services at Shirebrook are operated by East Midlands Railway.

On weekdays and Saturdays, the station is generally served by an hourly service northbound to Worksop and southbound to Nottingham via Mansfield Woodhouse.

There is currently no Sunday service at the station since the previous service of four trains per day was withdrawn in 2011. Sunday services at the station are due to recommence at the station during the life of the East Midlands franchise.

Preceding station	National Rail	Following station
Mansfield Woodhouse	East Midlands Railway: Robin Hood Line; Monday-Saturday only	Langwith-Whaley Thorns or Creswell
	Disused railways	
Mansfield Woodhouse Line and station open	Great Central Railway Lancashire, Derbyshire and East Coast Railway	Shirebrook North Line and station closed
Mansfield Woodhouse Line and station open	Great Central Railway Lancashire, Derbyshire and East Coast Railway	Warsop Line and station closed
Mansfield Woodhouse Line and station open	Midland Railway Robin Hood Line	Langwith Line open, station closed

== Other reading ==
- Little, Lawson (1995). Langwith Junction, the Life and Times of a Railway Village. Newark: Vesper Publications. ISBN 0-9526171-0-2.
