= Tuxford Central railway station =

Former railway station in Nottinghamshire, England

Coordinates: 53.2243°N 0.9032°W

Tuxford Central

General information
- Location: Tuxford, Bassetlaw, Nottinghamshire; England
- Grid reference: SK 734 702
- Platforms: 2

Other information
- Status: Disused

History
- Original company: LD&ECR
- Pre-grouping: Great Central Railway
- Post-grouping: LNER; British Railways

Key dates
- 15 December 1896: Opened as Tuxford
- 1 July 1923: Renamed Tuxford Central
- 19 September 1955: Closed
Location

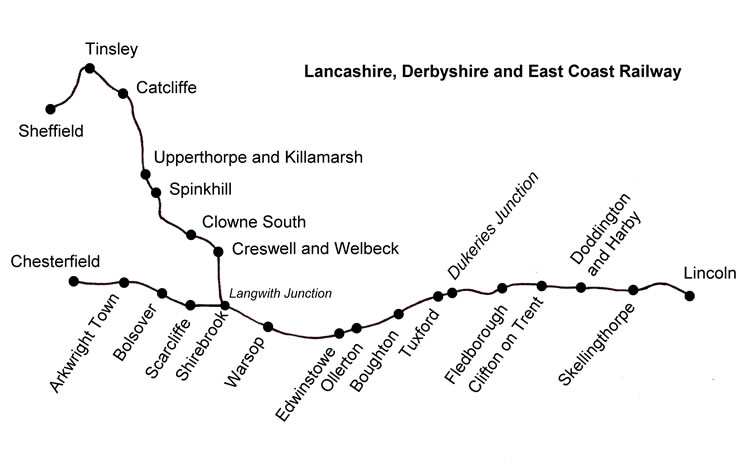
LD&ECR and Sheffield District Railway

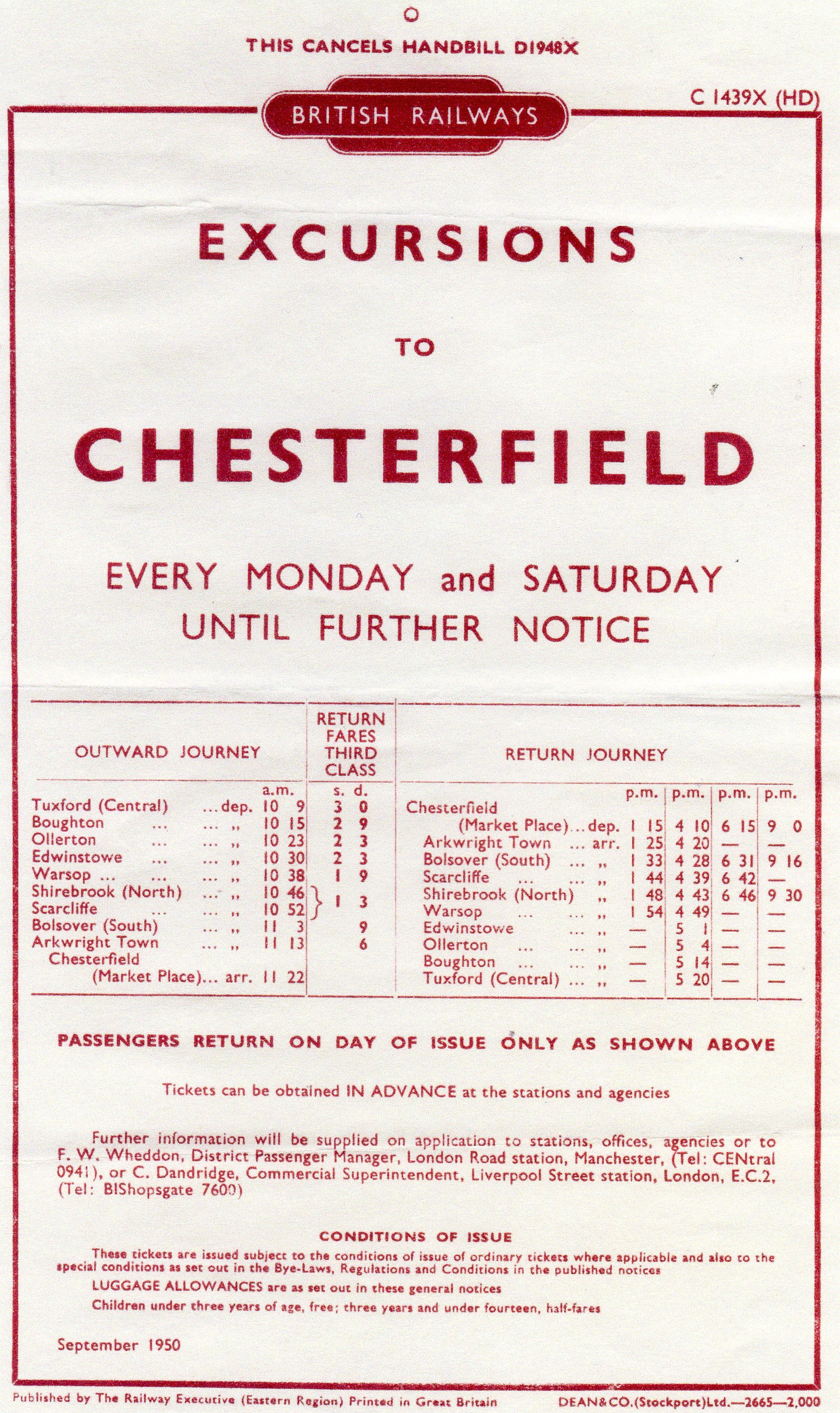
1950 Excursion Advert

Tuxford Central railway station is a former railway station in Tuxford, Nottinghamshire, England.

== Nearby stations ==
There were two other stations serving Tuxford. Dukeries Junction, originally Tuxford Exchange, was the next station east about a mile away, while Tuxford North was about a mile to the north east on a different line.

== Context ==
The station was opened by the LD&ECR on its main line from Chesterfield Market Place to Lincoln. The LD&ECR was taken over by the GCR in 1907 and subsequently became part of the LNER in 1923 then British Railways on nationalisation in 1948. The station buildings were in the company's standard modular architecture, very similar to Edwinstowe and Bolsover South. Of the LD&ECR stations only Tuxford Central and Dukeries Junction were recorded as being electrically lit, the others being lit by gas or oil.

The line crossed a series of ridges between river valleys. From Ollerton it climbed at around 1 in 150 to Boughton after which it descended through Tuxford Central heading towards the River Trent.

A mile to the east at Dukeries Junction the LD&ECR line crossed the GNR's main line, now known as the ECML. On 16 November 1896 a substantial, 60 chains (1.2 km) double-track, West-North connection ("chord") was built between the two lines east of Tuxford Central, effectively forming a triangle, as shown on the 1947 map linked below. The northern point of the triangle was Tuxford North Junction, a short distance south of Tuxford North station.

The station opened in March 1897 and closed in 1955. The station building has since been razed to the ground.

== Former Services ==
There was no Sunday service at Tuxford Central, apart from summer Sundays before World War I.

In 1922 3 trains per day plied between Chesterfield Market Place and Lincoln with a market day extra on Fridays between Langwith Junction and Lincoln. All these trains called at Tuxford Central.

From 1951 trains stopped running through to Chesterfield, turning back at Langwith Junction instead. Otherwise the same pattern continued until the last train on 17 September 1955.

The only ordinary timetabled passenger trains to run over the West-North chord were an all-year weekday service between Leeds, Doncaster, Mansfield and Nottingham (with through carriages to Bournemouth), from 11 July 1927 until withdrawn from 1 May 1933; they did not call at either Tuxford station. Thereafter, Summer holiday trains from Nottinghamshire via Mansfield Central to the Yorkshire Coast did so for many years, passing through Tuxford Central and Tuxford North without stopping. During World War II these were suspended, but an unadvertised workers' train between Mansfield and Ranskill used the curve between 1942 and 1945.

Trains continued to pass, with Summer excursions both via Lincoln and via the North-West chord continuing until 1964, but the picture was of progressive decline. The chord was closed on 3 February 1969, ending one source of through traffic. The run-down was abruptly accelerated in 1980 when a derailment east of Fledborough Viaduct led to the immediate closure of the line as a through route.

From 1980 the only traffic, apart from occasional enthusiasts' specials, was coal to High Marnham Power Station. After the power station closed in 2003 the track through the station site became redundant.

== Tuxford Works and Engine Shed ==
North west of the triangle of lines described above was Tuxford Locomotive Works and within the triangle was Tuxford Engine Shed.

The locomotive works, known locally as "The Plant", was small but capable of performing most engineering functions, other than locomotive building. It could, for example, replace locomotive boilers and fireboxes. It employed 130 men. The LNER closed it as a locomotive works in 1927, but it continued as a carriage and predominantly wagon works for many years thereafter. The buildings were more or less intact in 1972, but by 1977 had all been razed to the ground except the main erecting halls, which are still used, albeit not for railway purposes.

The engine shed was originally expected to be the line's principal depot, however, it was soon realised that the main centre of activity would be Langwith Junction.

On 1 January 1923 the following classes of locomotive were allocated to Tuxford.

GCR class	LNER Class	Wheel Arrangement	No. allocated	Remarks
D	M1	0-6-4T	8	Trip, shunting and assistance (banking) duties
A	N6	0-6-2T	8	Trip and shunting locomotives

Nevertheless, the shed continued to house goods and shunting locomotives until closure on 31 January 1959. The shed was equipped with a water softening plant, but no turntable. Coaling facilities were crude to the end. The shed was the final home of the original LD&ECR 0-6-4T "Big Tanks" (LNER Class M1.)

Upon closure locomotives and jobs were transferred to Langwith Junction, so a daily Dido train was provided for the staff concerned.

== Modern times ==
The line through Tuxford Central was reopened to non-passenger traffic in August 2009 as the High Marnham Test Track. The line is used by Network Rail to test new engineering trains and on-track plant.

The new test line runs from Thoresby Colliery Junction to the site of the partially demolished High Marnham Power Station, and passes former station sites of Ollerton, Boughton (Nottinghamshire), Tuxford Central and Dukeries Junction.

Preceding station	Disused railways	Following station
Boughton; Line and station closed	Great Central Railway; Lancashire, Derbyshire and East Coast Railway	Dukeries Junction; Line and station closed
