= Tuxford North railway station =

Former railway station in Nottinghamshire, England

Tuxford North
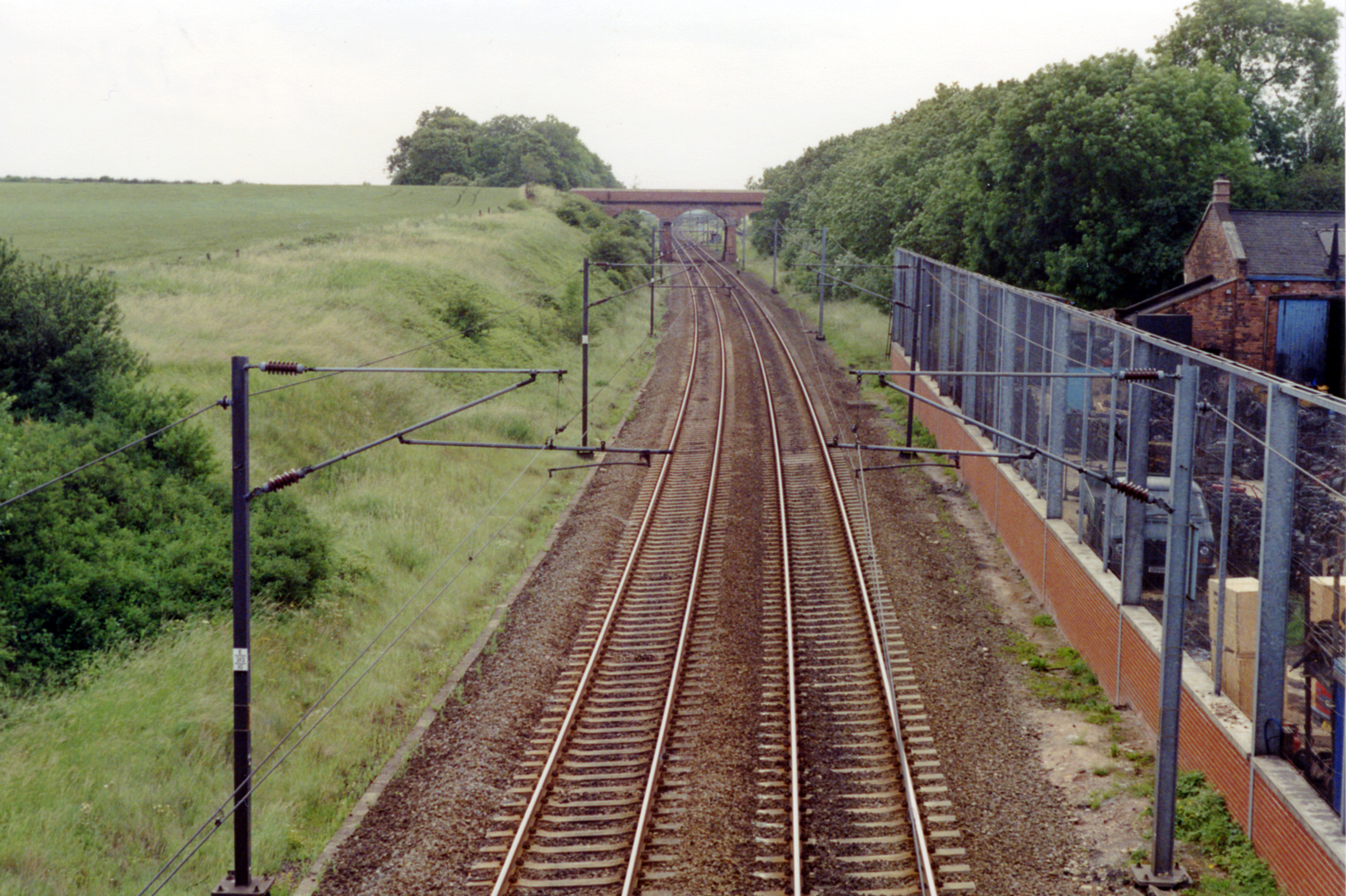
- The site of the station in 1992

General information
- Location: Tuxford, Bassetlaw, Nottinghamshire; England
- Coordinates: 53.2340°N 0.8814°W
- Grid reference: SK 747 714
- Platforms: 2

Other information
- Status: Disused

History
- Original company: Great Northern Railway
- Pre-grouping: GNR
- Post-grouping: LNER; British Railways

Key dates
- 1852: Opened as Tuxford
- 1 July 1923: Renamed Tuxford North
- July 1955: Closed for passengers
- 15 June 1964: closed for freight
Location

Tuxford North railway station once served the town of Tuxford in Nottinghamshire, England.

== Nearby stations ==
There were two other stations serving Tuxford. Dukeries Junction, formerly Tuxford Exchange, was the next station south, about half a mile away. Tuxford Central was about a mile to the south west on a different line.

== Context ==
The station was opened in 1852 by the Great Northern Railway (GNR) on its main line from King's Cross to Doncaster. The GNR became part of the LNER in 1923, then British Railways on nationalisation in 1948.

The station had two platforms and a signal box, originally simply named "Tuxford", which controlled the Lincoln Road level crossing immediately north of the station. The road is now the A6075 and the level crossing has been replaced by a bridge which crosses the busy tracks slightly to the south.

The station was closed in 1955 and has since been razed to the ground.

The tracks through the station site are now part of the electrified East Coast Main Line.

== Former services ==
Tuxford's three stations were connected, forming a triangle. However, it was only ever possible to catch trains along two sides of the triangle, i.e. between:

- Tuxford Central and the high level platforms at Dukeries Junction;
- Tuxford North and the low level platforms at Dukeries Junction.

Traffic along the third side of the triangle between Tuxford Central and Tuxford North was mainly freight, supplemented by summer weekend excursions from the Nottinghamshire/Derbyshire area to the Yorkshire coast; these passed through both stations without stopping.

In 1922

- five northbound trains a day called at Tuxford (it was renamed Tuxford North a year later) en route from Newark (later renamed Newark North Gate) to Retford, where there were good connections west, north and east
- six southbound trains called heading for Newark, with connections east, south and west.

Of the five northbound stoppers, only two picked up at Dukeries Junction, except on Fridays when three picked up there. Similarly, three southbound trains called at Dukeries Junction, with a fourth on Fridays.

Only one train in each direction called at Tuxford North on Sundays, on which days Dukeries Junction was closed.

Tuxford North stuttered along until July 1955 and Tuxford Central until September 1955; Dukeries Junction had closed in 1950. The summer excursions continued to pass until 1964. The "third side of the triangle" which connected Tuxford North and Central was closed in 1969.

== Oil transport ==
Oil from nearby Nottinghamshire and Leicestershire oil fields was taken by tanker to the station, then by train to Uphall railway station in West Lothian, in the 1950s.

== Modern times ==
Tracks through the site of Dukeries Junction's low level platforms were slewed when the East Coast Main Line was electrified, enabling trains to go faster. This erased any last trace of the low-level platforms. Unusually for those days, the high-level station buildings were removed in the 1950s.

The line through the sites of Tuxford Central and the high level platforms at Dukeries Junction became redundant when High Marnham Power Station closed in 2003; however, the line reopened in 2009 as High Marnham Test Track.

Former Services

Preceding station	Disused railways	Following station
Retford	British Railways; GNR	Dukeries Junction
Retford	British Railways; GNR	Tuxford Central
