= Dukeries Junction railway station =

Former railway station in Nottinghamshire, England

Dukeries Junction
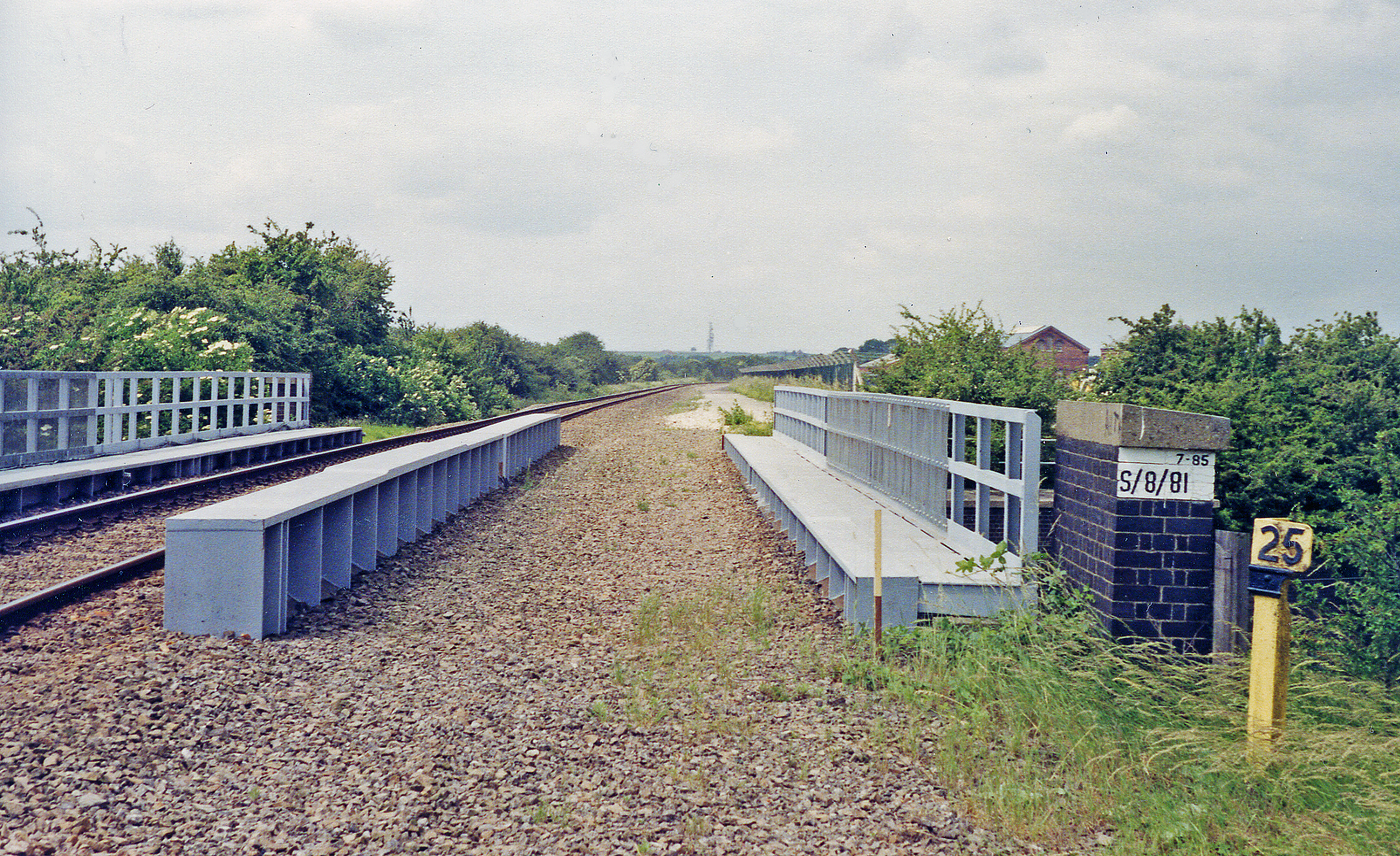
- Site of the station's high level platforms in 1992

General information
- Location: Tuxford, Bassetlaw, Nottinghamshire; England
- Coordinates: 53.2256°N 0.8774°W
- Grid reference: SK 750 704
- Platforms: 4; 2 at ground level, 2 overhead

Other information
- Status: Disused

History
- Original company: High level: Lancashire, Derbyshire and East Coast Railway; Low level: Great Northern Railway
- Pre-grouping: High level: Great Central Railway; Low level: Great Northern Railway
- Post-grouping: London and North Eastern Railway; British Railways

Key dates
- 1 June 1897: Opened as Tuxford Exchange, later renamed Dukeries Junction
- 6 March 1950: Closed
Location

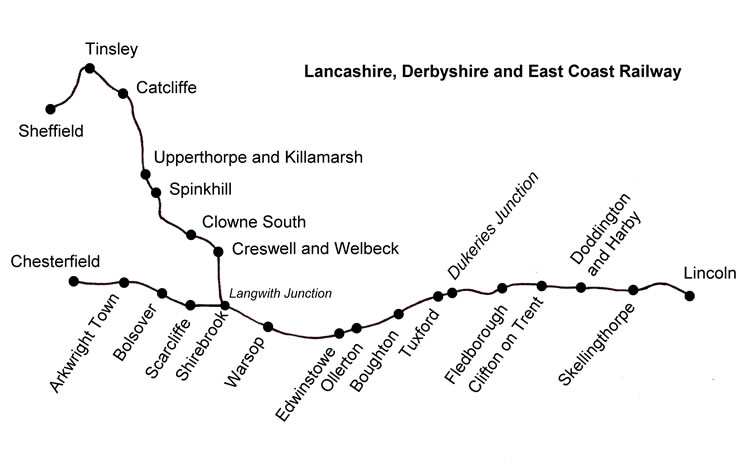
LD&ECR and Sheffield District Railway

Dukeries Junction, originally Tuxford Exchange, was a railway station near Tuxford, Nottinghamshire, England. The station opened in 1897 and closed in 1950. It was located at the bridge where the Lancashire, Derbyshire and East Coast Railway crossed over the East Coast Main Line (ECML), with sets of platforms on both lines. The high-level location is now part of the High Marnham Test Track.

== Nearby stations ==
There were two other stations serving Tuxford. Tuxford Central was one mile west of the bridge over the ECML, and Tuxford North was half a mile north of the bridge.

== Context ==
The station was jointly opened by the LD&ECR and GNR on 1 June 1897. It was originally called "Tuxford Exchange", being situated where the LD&ECR's main line from Chesterfield Market Place to Lincoln (later Lincoln Central) crossed over the GNR's main line from Kings Cross to Doncaster. It was soon renamed "Dukeries Junction". The station was closed by British Railways in March 1950.

Dukeries Junction was, in modern parlance, a two-level interchange. It was never intended to serve Tuxford as such, being situated throughout its life surrounded on one quarter by railway sidings and an engine shed and on the other three quarters by fields, with no road access. The LD&ECR hoped to attract tourist traffic to the North Nottinghamshire area, which they promoted as "The Dukeries", though this traffic never materialised. Years after it closed, Centre Parcs became a success in the Dukeries. The station's principal use over the years was by railway workers at the workshop and engine shed described below.

The station had two opposing platforms on the GNR's lower level tracks and wooden buildings on a wooden, island platform with two faces on the LD&ECR's tracks immediately above. The two levels were connected by stairs. The only other station on the LD&ECR with an island platform was Scarcliffe. Of the LD&ECR stations only Tuxford Central and Dukeries Junction were recorded as being electrically lit, the others being lit by gas or oil. A down loop ran outside the more westerly low level platform and a refuge siding lay behind the southbound platform. The footpath to the station passed between the main line and this siding.

On 16 November 1896, a substantial, 60-chain (1.2 km) double-track, West-North connection ("chord") was opened joining the LD&ECR and the GNR, effectively creating a triangle, with a station near each point, as shown on the 1947 map linked below. The chord carried goods, but no regular passenger traffic, though it came to life at summer weekends up to 1964 with holiday trains and excursions from Nottinghamshire to the Yorkshire Coast which passed through without stopping. It played a part in a minor railway "last", in that the final timetabled steam train south along the ECML from Retford was not a LNER Gresley A3 to Kings Cross, but Stanier Black 5 No. 45444 running to Nottingham Victoria via Tuxford's West to North curve in September 1964. The chord was in plain view of Dukeries Junction station but did not pass through it.

An embankment was built for a proposed west to south curve, but tracks were never laid.

== Former services ==
There never was a Sunday service at Dukeries Junction.

In 1922, three trains per day left Dukeries Junction high level eastbound for Lincoln, with a market day extra on Fridays; while three trains per day left Dukeries Junction high level westbound for Chesterfield Market Place (with the Friday extra terminating at Langwith Junction—later renamed Shirebrook North).

Two trains per day left Dukeries Junction low level northbound for Tuxford North and Retford, with a third calling to set down only, except on Fridays when it both picked up and set down. Three trains per day left Dukeries Junction low level southbound for Crow Park and Newark, with a third calling to set down only, except on Fridays when it both picked up and set down.

There were eight possible traffic flows:

- Northbound, change platform, proceed Eastwards (e.g. London to Fledborough)
- Westbound, change platform, proceed Southwards (e.g. return from Fledborough to London)
- Southbound, change platform, proceed Eastwards (e.g. York to Fledborough)
- Westbound, change platform, proceed Northwards (e.g. return from Fledborough to York)

The traffic potential of these four flows was very limited, especially as there were far easier ways to get to and from Lincoln from both the North and the South. The companies clearly gave up on it, with an average waiting time of 116 minutes and a best case of 87 minutes, discounting the one train which gave a waiting time of three minutes, far too short to be practical where the connection was unadvertised so no train need be held if a service was late.

- Northbound, change platform, proceed Westwards (e.g. London to Edwinstowe )
- Eastbound, change platform, proceed Southwards (e.g. return from Edwinstowe to London)
- Southbound, change platform, proceed Westwards (e.g. York to Edwinstowe)
- Eastbound, change platform, proceed Northwards (e.g. return from Edwinstowe to York)

Given that the LD&ECR proclaimed itself as the Dukeries Route these latter four flows would be the target market, e.g. people visiting the area for a holiday or enabling the comfortably off of the area to travel to destinations such as London. Even so, the average waiting time was 56 minutes, skewed towards the last pair, where the average wait was 48 minutes. Dukeries Junction was in the middle of nowhere without refreshment facilities or even road access, such waits may not have been an inviting prospect.

== After closure ==
Unusually for those days, the high level station buildings were demolished not long after closure. The low level lines remain heavily used, though they were progressively rationalised as wagonload freight traffic declined.

Trains continued to pass through the high level station site, with summer excursions via Lincoln continuing until 1964, but the picture was of a progressive decline. The chord was closed on 3 February 1969. The run-down was abruptly accelerated in 1980 when a freight train derailment at Clifton-on-Trent, west of Fledborough Viaduct, seriously damaged the track. This led to the immediate closure of the line as a through route, since reinstatement was deemed uneconomic and the line from Pyewipe Junction as far as High Marnham was closed and lifted.

From 1980 the only traffic was coal to High Marnham Power Station and occasional enthusiasts' specials. When the power station closed in 2003 the track through the high level station site became redundant.

== Tuxford Works and Engine Shed ==
East of the triangle of lines described above was Tuxford Locomotive Works, and within the triangle was Tuxford Engine Shed. Both were plainly visible from Dukeries Junction station.

The locomotive works, known locally as "The Plant", was small but capable of performing most engineering functions, other than locomotive building. It could, for example, replace locomotive boilers and fireboxes. It employed 130 men. The LNER closed it as a locomotive works in 1927 but it continued as a carriage and predominantly wagon works for many years thereafter. The buildings were more or less intact in 1972, but by 1977 had all been razed to the ground except the main erecting halls, which are still used today, albeit not for railway purposes.

The engine shed was originally expected to be the line's principal depot but it was soon realised that the main centre of activity would be at Langwith Junction. Nevertheless, the shed survived until 31 January 1959. It was equipped with a water softening plant but had no turntable and the coaling facilities were crude to the end. The shed was the final home of the original LD&ECR Class D 0-6-4T "Big Tanks"

Upon closure, locomotives and jobs were transferred to Langwith Junction and a daily Dido train was provided to transport the staff concerned.

== Modern times ==
The ex-GNR low level lines are now part of the electrified East Coast Main Line, carrying heavy express traffic at 100 mph and more. When the line was electrified the tracks were slewed to increase speeds and all trace of the low level station was erased.

The ex-LD&ECR high level line through the site of Dukeries Junction was reopened to non-passenger traffic in August 2009 as the High Marnham Test Track. The line is used by Network Rail to test new engineering trains and on-track plant. The test track runs from Thoresby Colliery Junction to the site of the partially demolished High Marnham Power Station, passing the former station sites of Ollerton, Boughton, Tuxford Central and Dukeries Junction.

Preceding station	Disused railways	Following station
Tuxford Central; Line and station closed	Great Central Railway; High Level Platforms, LD&ECR	Fledborough; Line and station closed
Tuxford North; Line open, station closed	Great Northern Railway; Low Level Platforms	Crow Park; Line open, station closed
