= Ollerton railway station =

Former railway station in Nottinghamshire, England

Ollerton

General information
- Location: Ollerton, Newark and Sherwood; England
- Coordinates: 53.1943°N 1.0291°W
- Grid reference: SK 649 667
- Platforms: 2

Other information
- Status: Disused

History
- Original company: LD&ECR
- Pre-grouping: Great Central Railway
- Post-grouping: LNER; British Railways

Key dates
- 15 December 1896: Opened
- 19 September 1955: scheduled services ended
- 6 September 1964: excursions end, station closed
- 6 July 1991: reopened
- 8 July 1991: Closed
Location

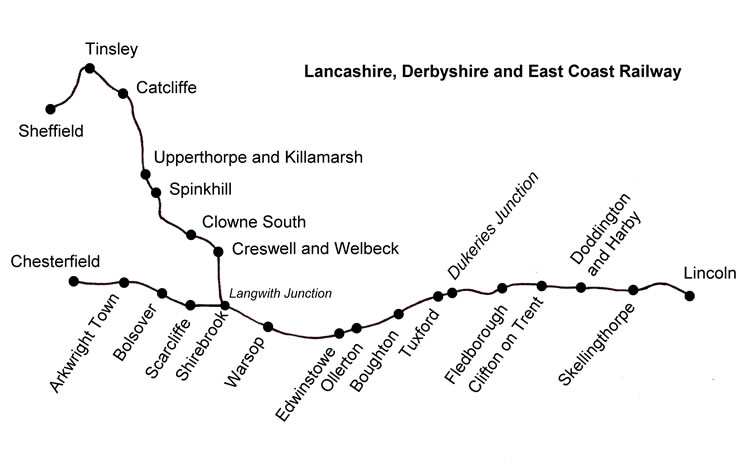
LD&ECR and Sheffield District Railway

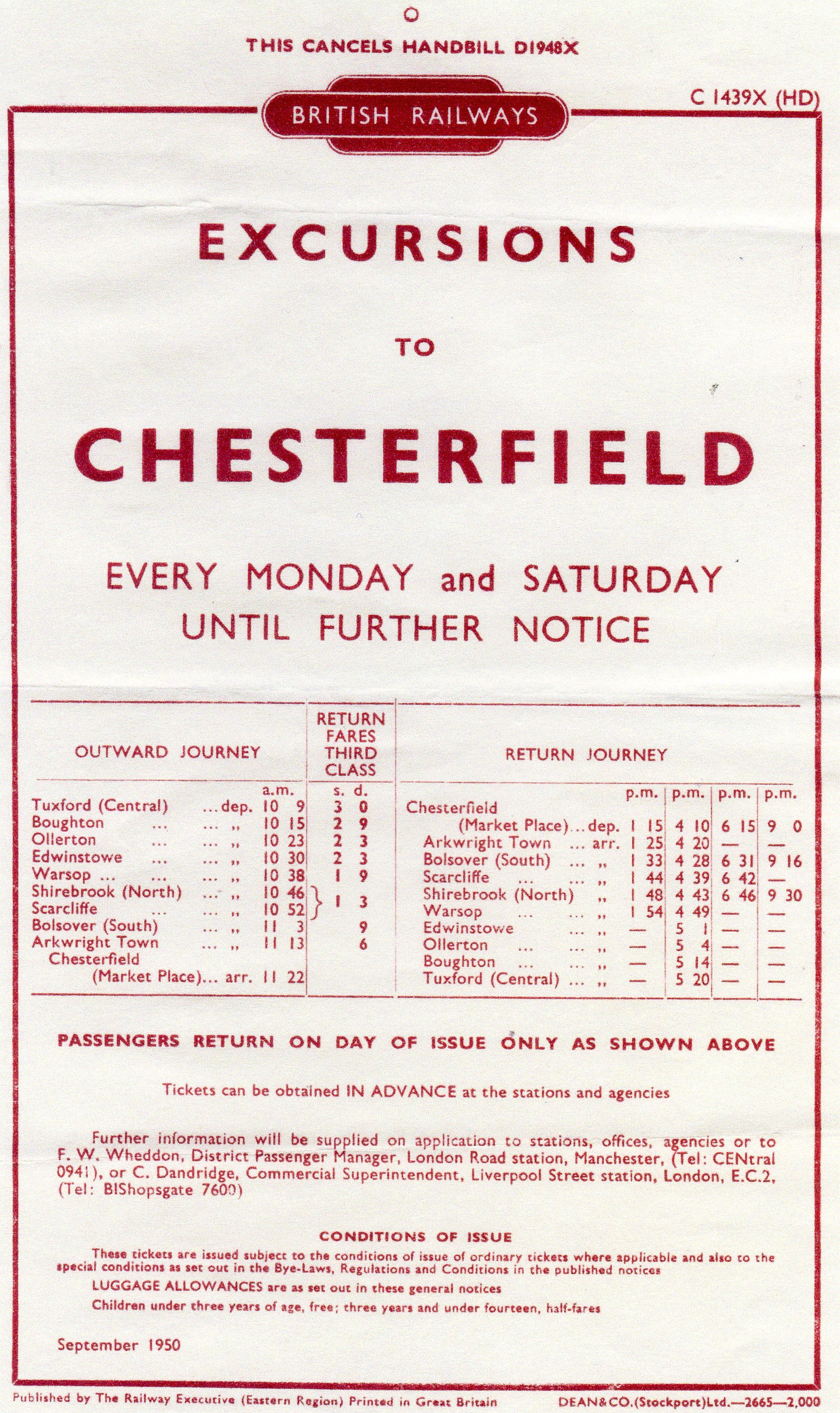
1950 Excursion Advert

Ollerton railway station is a former railway station in Ollerton, Nottinghamshire, England.

== History ==
The station was opened by the LD&ECR in 1896 and closed to local passenger traffic in 1955, though Summer holiday excursions to and from the East Coast continued to call until September 1964.

The station, goods shed and signalbox were built to standard LD&ECR patterns. Large water tanks were erected at both ends of the site.

== Former services ==
Two services called at Ollerton in 1922, but not on Sundays.

Three trains per day ran between Chesterfield Market Place and Lincoln with a market day extra on Fridays between Langwith Junction and Lincoln. These called at all stations. The truncated remains of this service ended in September 1955.

Three trains per day terminated at Ollerton from Nottingham Victoria via Mansfield Central then went back again half an hour or so later. This service was later cut back to Edwinstowe. A fourth train ran to Nottingham Victoria Monday to Friday, but on Saturdays it started from Lincoln and ran through to Leicester Central. This service did not survive the Second World War.

Summer Saturday holiday trains survived until 1964.

== Royal trains ==
As a marketing device the LD&ECR called itself "The Dukeries Route" because the line passed through an area of great landed estates. This led to visits to the area by Queen Victoria's son Edward, first as Prince of Wales and later as King Edward VII, usually in connection with a race meeting such as the St Leger. The Royal Train used Ollerton station from which the Royal Party went to a ducal residence by road.

== Coal ==
A branch was built to serve Ollerton Colliery which opened in 1926. This branch has now been severed from the "Main Line". In the mid-twentieth century, the LMS and LNER jointly proposed a coal line to be called the Mid-Notts Joint Railway from Bestwood Park Junction, near Nottingham to Checker House Junction on the former GCR line near Retford. Only the section between Ollerton and Farnsfield was built. The southern section to Bestwood Park was completed in the 1950s to serve the new Calverton Colliery.

Further eastwards the line climbed at around 1-in-150 towards Boughton as it crossed a ridge before the valley of the River Trent.

== Modern times ==
The line through Ollerton Station was reopened to non-passenger traffic in August 2009 as the High Marnham Test Track. The line is used by Network Rail to test new engineering trains and on-track plant.

The new test line runs from Thoresby Colliery Junction to the site of the partially demolished High Marnham Power Station, and passes former station sites of Ollerton, Boughton, Tuxford Central and Dukeries Junction, all these stations were closed by 1955.

The platforms remained in place in Spring 2018, 54 years after closure.

== The future ==
There have been hypothetical suggestions of reopening the line as a branch off the Robin Hood Line and reopening Warsop, Edwinstowe and Ollerton stations, providing an hourly service to Mansfield and Nottingham.

Former Services

| Preceding station | Disused railways | Following station |
|---|---|---|
| Edwinstowe; Line and station closed | Great Central Railway; Lancashire, Derbyshire and East Coast Railway | Boughton; Line and station closed |
