= Warsop railway station =

Former railway station in Nottinghamshire, England

Warsop

General information
- Location: Market Warsop, Mansfield; England
- Coordinates: 53°11′55.41″N 1°9′33.5″W
- Grid reference: SK 562 671
- Platforms: 2

Other information
- Status: Disused

History
- Original company: LD&ECR
- Pre-grouping: Great Central Railway
- Post-grouping: LNER; British Railways

Key dates
- 8 March 1897: Opened
- 19 September 1955: Closed to regular traffic
- 4 January 1965: Closed for freight
- After August 1976: Closed completely
Location

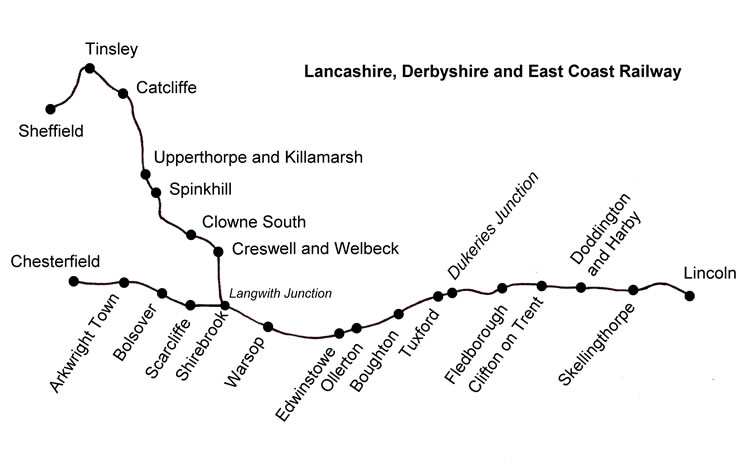
LD&ECR and Sheffield District Railway

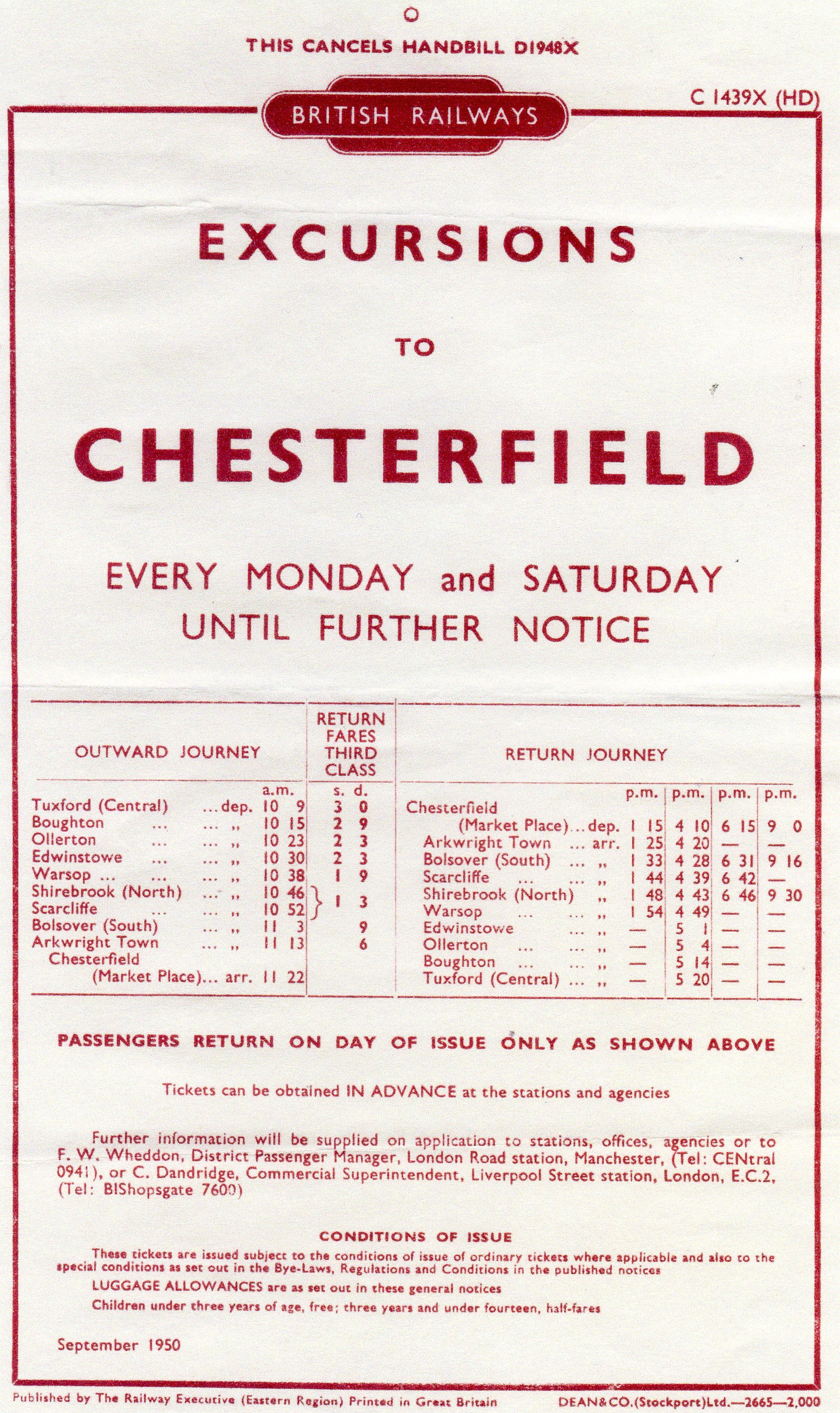
1950 Excursion Advert

Warsop railway station is a former railway station in Market Warsop, Nottinghamshire, England.

== History ==
The station was opened by the Lancashire, Derbyshire & East Coast Railway in March 1897 and closed by British Railways in 1955. The station building made use of the LD&ECR's standard modular architecture.

After leaving Shirebrook North station, the line crossed the Midland Nottingham to Worksop line (since 1998 the Robin Hood Line) and passed the LD&ECR Warsop yard near Warsop Junction. This yard is used by DB Cargo UK. To the north was a branch to Warsop Main colliery with extensive marshalling yards, now closed.

Shortly after this, in the days before the deep mines penetrating the limestone cap were sunk, the newly built line ran into countryside, crossed Warsop Vale on an embankment, and arrived at Warsop station.

Between Warsop and Edwinstowe the line climbed from the valley of the River Meden, heading for that of the River Maun. This was the beginning of the area known as The Dukeries, heavily promoted in the railway's literature in the hope of attracting tourist trade.

It passed by Warsop Windmill, where the GCR was later to provide a branch to Welbeck Colliery before reaching Clipstone, where it had been planned to build a branch to Mansfield. Instead it had built a curve into the Midland Railway line mentioned above. Sidings, however, were provided for the Duke of Portland. Further on into the Maun valley the GCR did build a junction for Mansfield Central, initially facing Lincoln, but then converted to a triangular one. Latterly this extended only to a group of collieries, all now closed.

== Passenger Services ==
There never was a Sunday service calling at Warsop.

In 1922 the advertised services were:

Eastbound

- 1 train to Nottingham Victoria via Mansfield Central
- 4 trains to Mansfield Central, with two extra on Saturdays
- 2 trains to Lincoln High Street (later renamed Lincoln Central, now plain Lincoln), with an extra on Friday, Lincoln's Market Day

Westbound

- 4 trains to Chesterfield Market Place, with two extra on Saturdays
- 1 to Langwith Junction (later renamed Shirebrook North) on Fridays
- 1 to Langwith Junction (later renamed Shirebrook North) on Saturdays

Passengers aiming for Mansfield on Saturday evenings could catch the 22:44, non-stop Eastbound to Mansfield Central or wait for the 23:38 westbound to Langwith Junction which doubled back down what is now the Robin Hood Line to the Midland station at Mansfield, arriving at Midnight.

The position in August 1939 was not greatly changed, though the late train to Mansfield Central had disappeared.

By the Summer of 1964 all regular timetabled local services had been gone for nine years, but it was still possible to catch a train to Mablethorpe or Skegness, or even to Radford via the Warsop to Shirebrook Junction curve, but it would be the following Saturday before a direct train back.

== Modern times ==
The line through the station site gives access from Shirebrook to UK Coal's Thoresby Colliery and to the High Marnham Test Track.

Since the closure of Thoresby Colliery, the traffic on the line has rapidly decreased and the line only has the High Marnham Test Track trains running every few months.

There is some hope of reopening the line as a branch off the Robin Hood Line and reopening Warsop, Edwinstowe and Ollerton stations, providing an hourly service to Mansfield and Nottingham.

Preceding station	Disused railways	Following station
Shirebrook North; Line and station closed	Great Central Railway; LD&ECR	Edwinstowe; Line and station closed
Shirebrook North; Line and station closed	Great Central Railway; LD&ECR	Mansfield Central; Line and station closed
Shirebrook West; Station open, line closed	British Railways; Summer Saturdays 1963-4	Edwinstowe; Line and station closed
