= Boughton railway station (Nottinghamshire) =

Former railway station in Nottinghamshire, England

Coordinates: 53.20397°N 0.97000°W

Boughton (Notts)
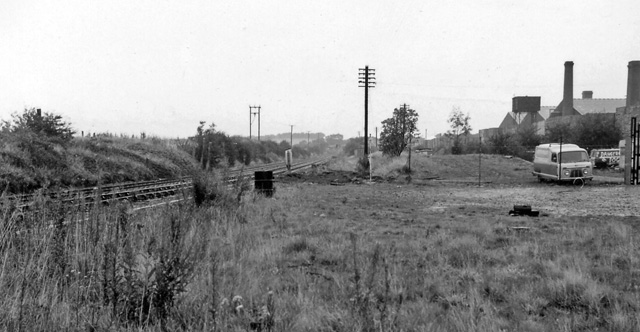
- The site of the former station

General information
- Location: Boughton, Newark and Sherwood, Nottinghamshire; England
- Grid reference: SK 688 678
- Platforms: 2

Other information
- Status: Disused

History
- Original company: LD&ECR
- Pre-grouping: Great Central Railway
- Post-grouping: LNER; British Railways

Key dates
- 8 March 1897: Opened
- 19 September 1955: Closed
Location

Pronounced
(listen)

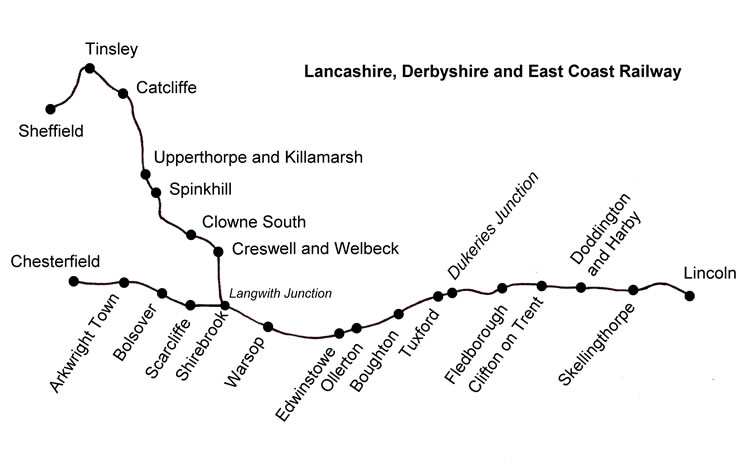
LD&ECR and Sheffield District Railway

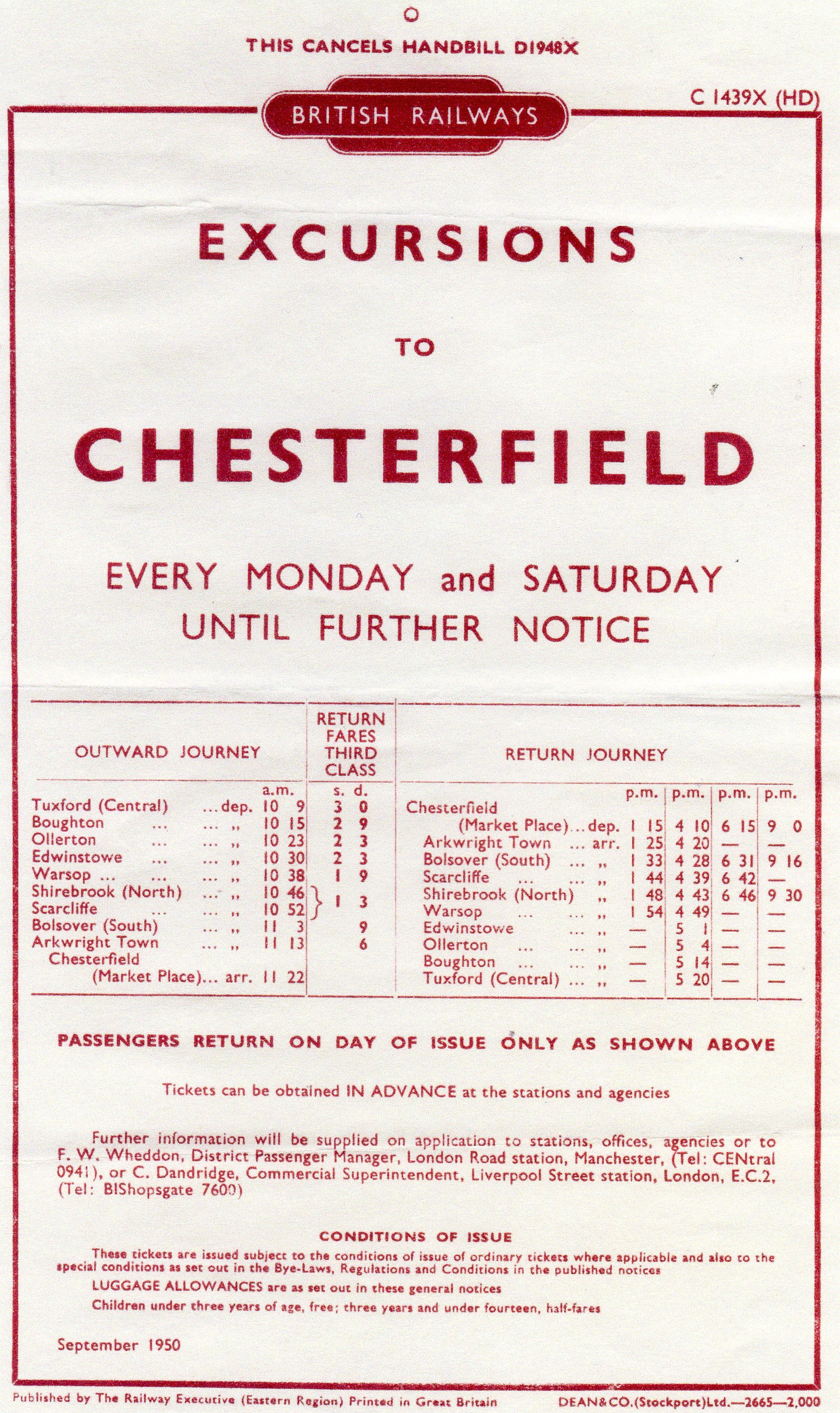
1950 Excursion Advert

Boughton railway station served the village of Boughton in Nottinghamshire, England from 1897 to 1955 when it was closed. It has since been razed to the ground.

== Context ==
The station was opened by the LD&ECR on its main line from Chesterfield Market Place to Lincoln. The LD&ECR was taken over by the GCR in 1907 and subsequently became part of the LNER in 1923 then British Railways on nationalisation in 1948. The platforms were wooden, similar to the high level platforms at Dukeries Junction. The stationmaster's house was characteristic of the line, but the station buildings were not, they appear to have been made of wood, but on another page Dow himself says otherwise.

The line crossed a series of ridges between river valleys. From Ollerton it climbed at around 1 in 150 to Boughton after which it descended to Tuxford Central heading towards the River Trent.

== Former Services ==
There never was a Sunday service at Boughton.

In 1922 three trains per day plied between Chesterfield Market Place and Lincoln with a market day extra on Fridays between Langwith Junction and Lincoln. All these trains called at all stations, though on the Friday extra Boughton was a request stop.

From 1951 trains stopped running through to Chesterfield, turning back at Langwith Junction instead. Otherwise the same pattern continued until the last train on 17 September 1955.

== Coal ==
The Wigan Coal and Iron Company intended to open a new colliery at Bevercotes and the LD&ECR obtained powers to build a branch from Boughton sidings. It did not materialise and for many years the branch terminated at a set of buffers in the countryside. The colliery was opened in 1965 and the stub of line finally came into use.

During World War II a connection was made to serve Boughton Ordnance Depot which had a large contingent of American service personnel.

== Modern times ==
The line through Boughton Station was reopened to non-passenger traffic in August 2009 as the High Marnham Test Track. The line is used by Network Rail to test new engineering trains and on-track plant.

The new test line runs from Thoresby Colliery Junction to the site of the partially demolished High Marnham Power Station, and passes former station sites of Ollerton, Boughton, Tuxford Central and Dukeries Junction, all these stations were closed by 1955.

Preceding station	Disused railways	Following station
Ollerton; Line and station closed	Great Central Railway; Lancashire, Derbyshire and East Coast Railway	Tuxford Central; Line and station closed
