= Ramsden Dock railway station =

Disused railway station in Cumbria, England

Ramsden Dock

General information
- Location: Barrow-in-Furness, Westmorland and Furness; England
- Coordinates: 54.0954°N 3.2279°W
- Grid reference: SD 197 673
- Platforms: 2

Other information
- Status: Disused

History
- Original company: Furness Railway
- Pre-grouping: Furness Railway
- Post-grouping: London Midland and Scottish Railway

Key dates
- 1 June 1881: Station opened as Ramsden Dock
- 1 June 1882: Renamed Barrow Ramsden Dock
- April 1915: Last train
- 8 December 1937: Officially closed
Location

Ramsden Dock railway station (also known as Barrow Island and officially as Barrow Ramsden Dock) was the terminus of the Furness Railway's Ramsden Dock Branch in Barrow-in-Furness, England.

The station operated between 1881 and 1915. Located at the southern tip of Barrow Island alongside Ramsden Dock it primarily served the adjacent Walney Channel passenger ferry terminal. It was accessible by Ramsden Dock Road and the Barrow-in-Furness Tramway.

The station building was demolished in the 1940s, while the rail line leading to it was completely removed in the 1990s. No evidence of either remain and a windfarm operations centre has been built on the site.

Preceding station	Historical railways	Following station
Island Road	Furness Railway	Terminus
