= Elspeth Gibson =

British fashion designer (born 1963)

- Born: 1963 (age 62–63); Nottingham, England
- Education: Tuxford Comprehensive School, Mansfield College of Art and Design
- Occupation: Fashion designer
- Children: 2
- Website: www.elspethgibson.com

Elspeth Gibson (born 4 March 1963) is a British fashion designer, known for her feminine style of design.

Her designs are often characterised by lace, beading and embroidery. Gibson was the British Fashion Council's New Generation Designer of the Year in 1998, and examples of her work are held in the design archive at the Victoria and Albert Museum. Her clients have included Madonna, Zara Phillips, Cate Blanchett, Uma Thurman and Queen Rania of Jordan, for whom she has undertaken private commissions.

== Career ==
During her teenage years Gibson attended Tuxford Comprehensive School. After graduating from Mansfield College of Art and Design in 1984, Gibson began her career with a work experience placement at Zandra Rhodes. She worked as a designer for various high street stores over the next 10 years, including Topshop, Miss Selfridge and Monix, where she was head designer.

Gibson left Monix to become a freelance designer in 1994 and launched her own label in 1995. She pitched her designs to high-end stores, securing an early order from Liberty & Co. Gibson attracted attention from Vogue when she showed an early collection at the London Designers' Exhibition accompanying London Fashion Week. In 1997, editor Alexandra Shulman wrote: "the most commonly bought item in the Vogue offices this season is an Elspeth Gibson skirt ... they seem to strike the right balance, looking modern and different without being too extreme".

In 1998, Gibson opened a boutique in Pont Street, Knightsbridge, and made her debut at London Fashion Week. She won the British Fashion Council's New Generation Designer of the Year Award in 1998 and Best British Designer at the Elle Style Awards in 1999.

Gibson has focused on couture since 2001 but has also entered into collaborations with high-street brands. These include a womenswear collection for Littlewoods, a childrenswear collection for Debenhams and lingerie for Gossard, and girlswear and homewares for Tesco.

== Personal life ==
Gibson was born in Nottingham and lives in London with her two daughters.
