= Edwinstowe railway station =

Former railway station in Nottinghamshire, England

Edwinstowe
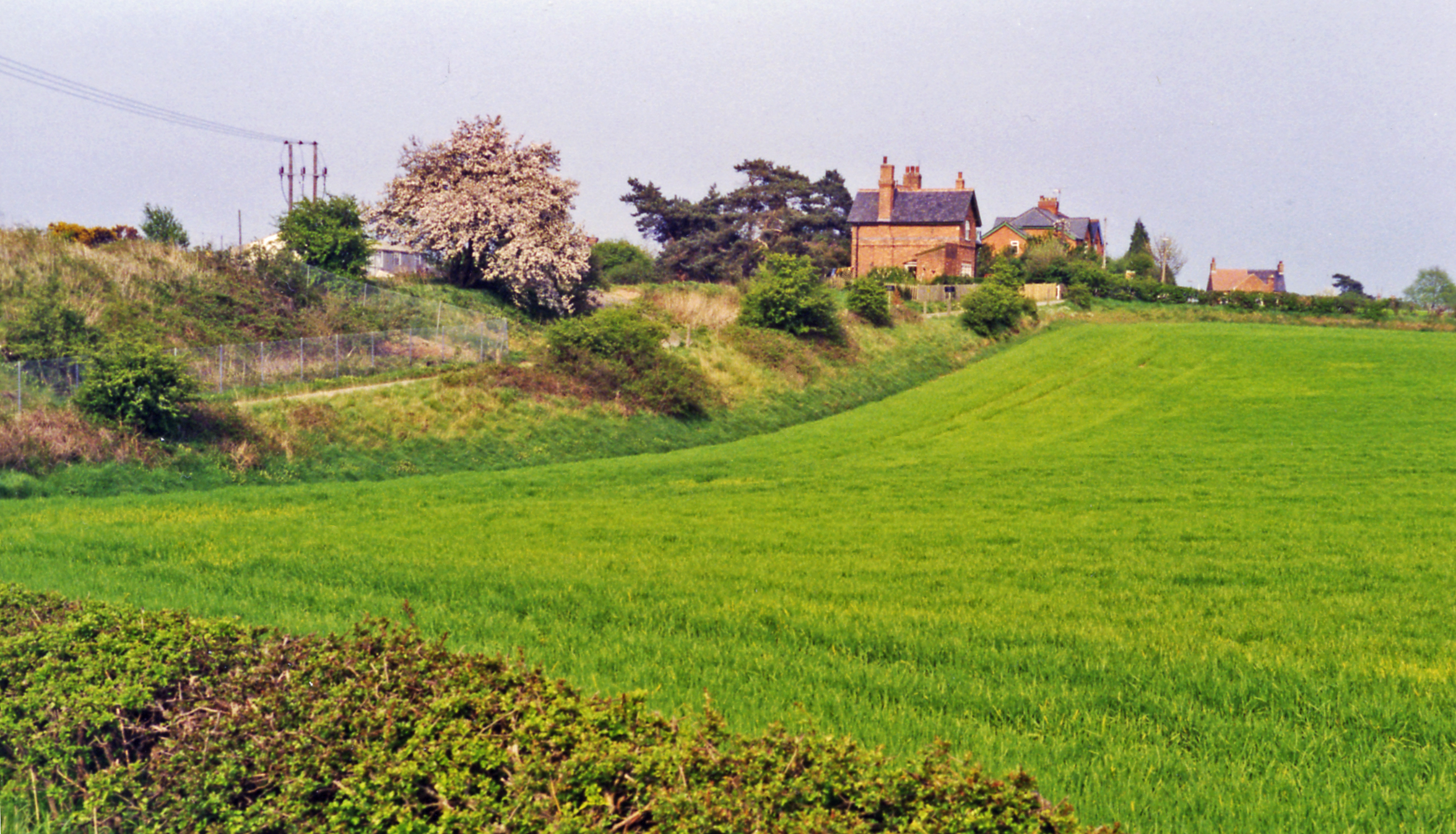
- Site of the station in 1995

General information
- Location: Edwinstowe, Newark and Sherwood; England
- Coordinates: 53°11′20.7″N 1°3′55.4″W
- Grid reference: SK 625 661
- Platforms: 4

Other information
- Status: Disused

History
- Original company: Lancashire, Derbyshire and East Coast Railway
- Pre-grouping: Great Central Railway
- Post-grouping: London and North Eastern Railway; British Railways

Key dates
- 15 December 1896: Opened
- 19 September 1955: Shirebrook North to Lincoln service withdrawn
- 2 January 1956: Closed to passengers
- 5 September 1964: Excursion traffic ended
- After August 1976: Closed completely
Location

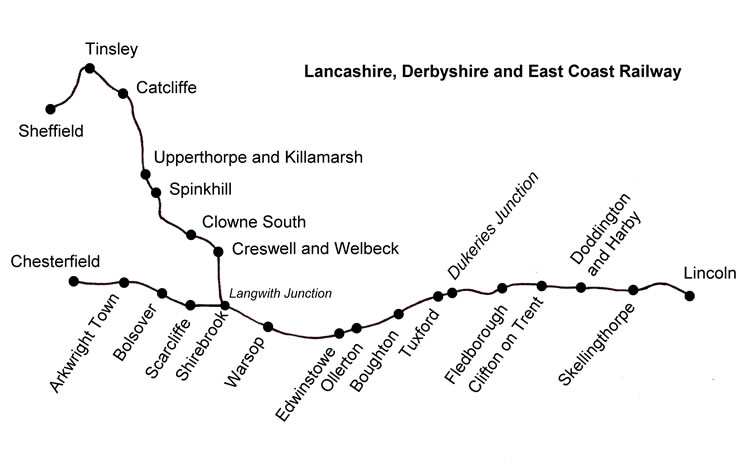
LD&ECR and Sheffield District Railway

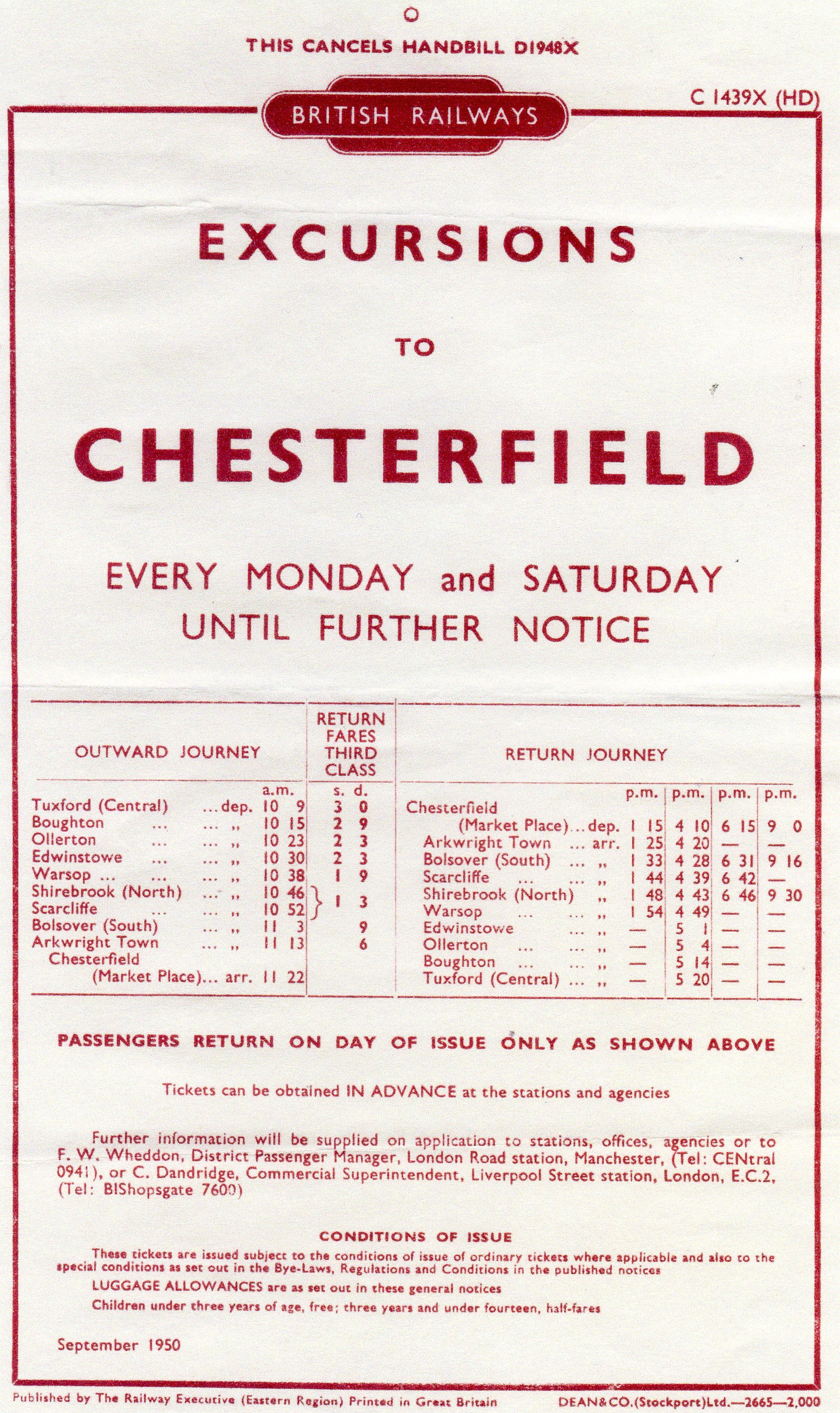
1950 Excursion Advert

Edwinstowe railway station is a former railway station in Edwinstowe, Nottinghamshire, England.

== History ==
The station was opened by the Lancashire, Derbyshire and East Coast Railway in 1896 and closed by British Railways on 2 January 1956, though the last train ran on 31 December 1955.

The station was envisaged as the centre of the line's passenger traffic and was one of only three to have a Refreshment room, the others being Chesterfield Market Place and Shirebrook North. The station buildings and signalbox followed the company's standard modular architecture pattern.

== Context ==
From Warsop the line entered the valley of the River Maun with Sherwood Forest visible to the north. This was, and is, an area known as The Dukeries, heavily promoted in the railway's literature in the hope of attracting tourist trade. This never materialised in LD&ECR days, but the success of the modern-day Center Parcs near to Edwinstowe suggests the company had the right idea at the wrong time.

== Former services ==
There never was a Sunday service at Edwinstowe.

Two services called at Edwinstowe in 1922:

Three trains per day plied between Chesterfield Market Place and Lincoln with a market day extra on Fridays between Langwith Junction and Lincoln. All these trains called at all stations. The truncated remains of this service ended in September 1955.

Three trains per day terminated at Ollerton from Nottingham Victoria via Mansfield Central then went back again half an hour or so later, calling at Edwinstowe in both directions. A fourth train from Nottingham didn't go through to Ollerton, but turned round at Edwinstowe. The service through to Ollerton was later cut back to Edwinstowe. A fifth train ran to Nottingham Victoria Monday to Friday, but on Saturdays it started from Lincoln and ran through to Leicester Central. This service did not survive the Second World War.

The Edwinstowe-Mansfield Central-Nottingham Victoria service outlived the LD&ECR "Main Line" service to Lincoln by three and a half months, closing on 2 January 1956, though the last train ran on Saturday 31 December 1955. This meant that Edwinstowe was the last LD&ECR station to have a regular, timetabled passenger service.

Excursions and Summer Weekend holiday traffic continued until September 1964.

== Coal ==
When the line was built Edwinstowe was still in open countryside. Subsequently, deep mining techniques were perfected to penetrate the limestone cap, enabling new collieries to be opened. A branch was built a little way to the east to serve Thoresby Colliery, one of the most productive mines at the time.

== Modern times ==
The line through the station site gives access from Shirebrook to UK Coal's Thoresby Colliery and to the High Marnham Test Track.

== The future ==
There have been hypothetical suggestions of reopening the line as a branch off the Robin Hood Line and reopening Warsop, Edwinstowe and Ollerton stations, providing an hourly service to Mansfield and Nottingham.

Former Services

Preceding station	Disused railways	Following station
Warsop; Line and station closed	Great Central Railway; LD&ECR	Ollerton; Line and station closed
Mansfield Central; Line and station closed	Great Central Railway; Mansfield Railway	Ollerton; Line and station closed
