= Island Road railway station =

Disused railway station in Cumbria, England

Island Road or Barrow Shipyard

General information
- Location: Barrow-in-Furness, Westmorland and Furness; England
- Coordinates: 54.1030°N 3.2267°W
- Grid reference: SD 19886 68153
- Platforms: 2

Other information
- Status: Disused

History
- Original company: Furness Railway
- Pre-grouping: Furness Railway
- Post-grouping: London Midland and Scottish Railway

Key dates
- 1 May 1899: Station opened
- 5 July 1967: Closed completely
Location

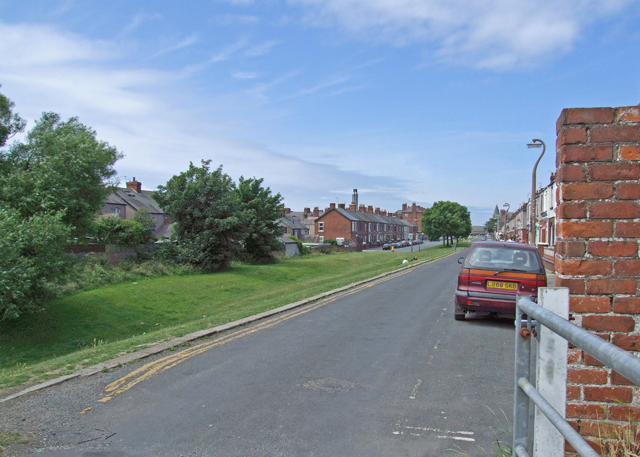
Site of the former station, the strip of grass running the length of Island Road marks the route of the original rail line

Island Road railway station (also known as Barrow Shipyard and locally simply as Shipyard station) was a railway station at the centre of Barrow Island, Barrow-in-Furness, England which operated between 1899 and 1967. It was built by the Furness Railway near the junction of the Ramsden Branch Line and a line which ran through the industrial areas of the town.

The station was never intended for general public use. In 1901 it carried more than 1700 workers daily on workmen's trains to the Vickers shipyard and the surrounding company housing. These trains ran from Millom, Grange-over-Sands and Coniston. Initially the station had just one platform, but a second was added in 1915.

A limited publicly advertised service had started by 1915 and excursion trains for Rugby league matches and Sunday School outings called.

The station and associated workmen's trains survived until the closure of the unsafe Buccleuch Dock bridge on 31 December 1966 which cut access to the site. The station and line have both since been demolished, although two metal posts that formed the entrance to the south-bound platform have been preserved.

Preceding station	Historical railways	Following station
Barrow-in-Furness Central; Line closed, station open	Furness Railway	Ramsden Dock; Line and station closed
