= Tuxford =

Town and civil parish in Nottinghamshire, England

Coordinates: 53.231°N 0.898°W

- Town and civil parish
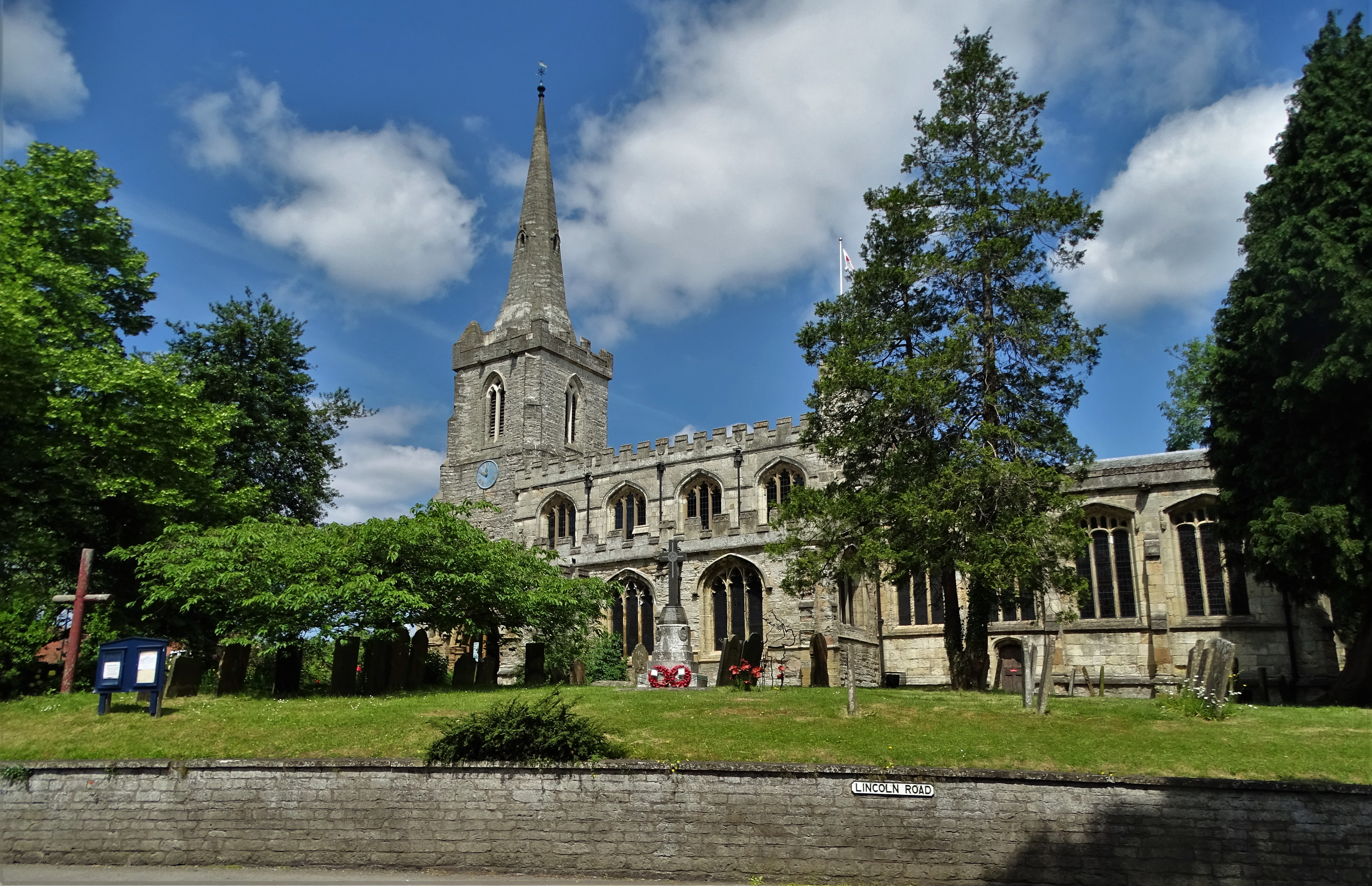
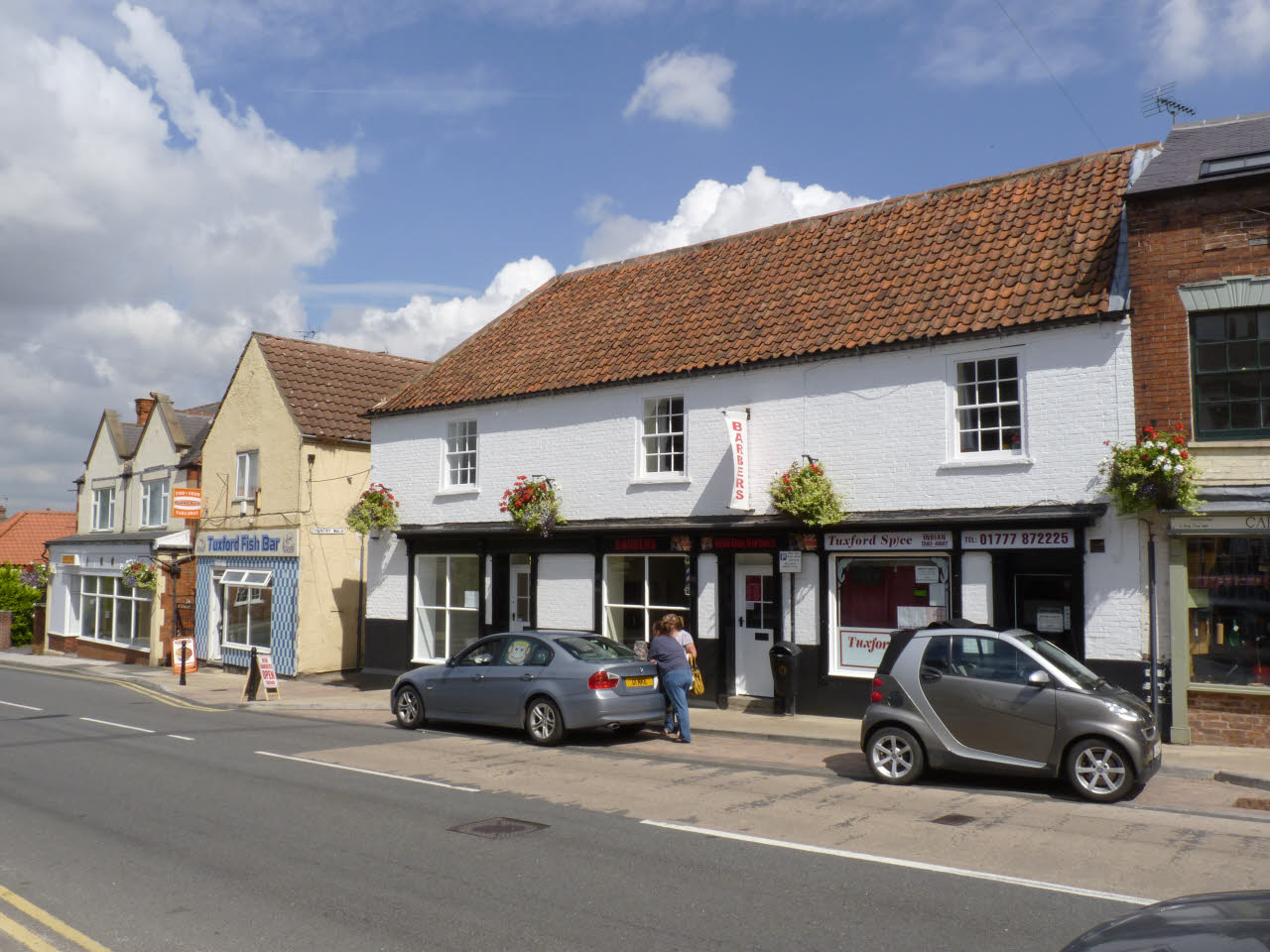
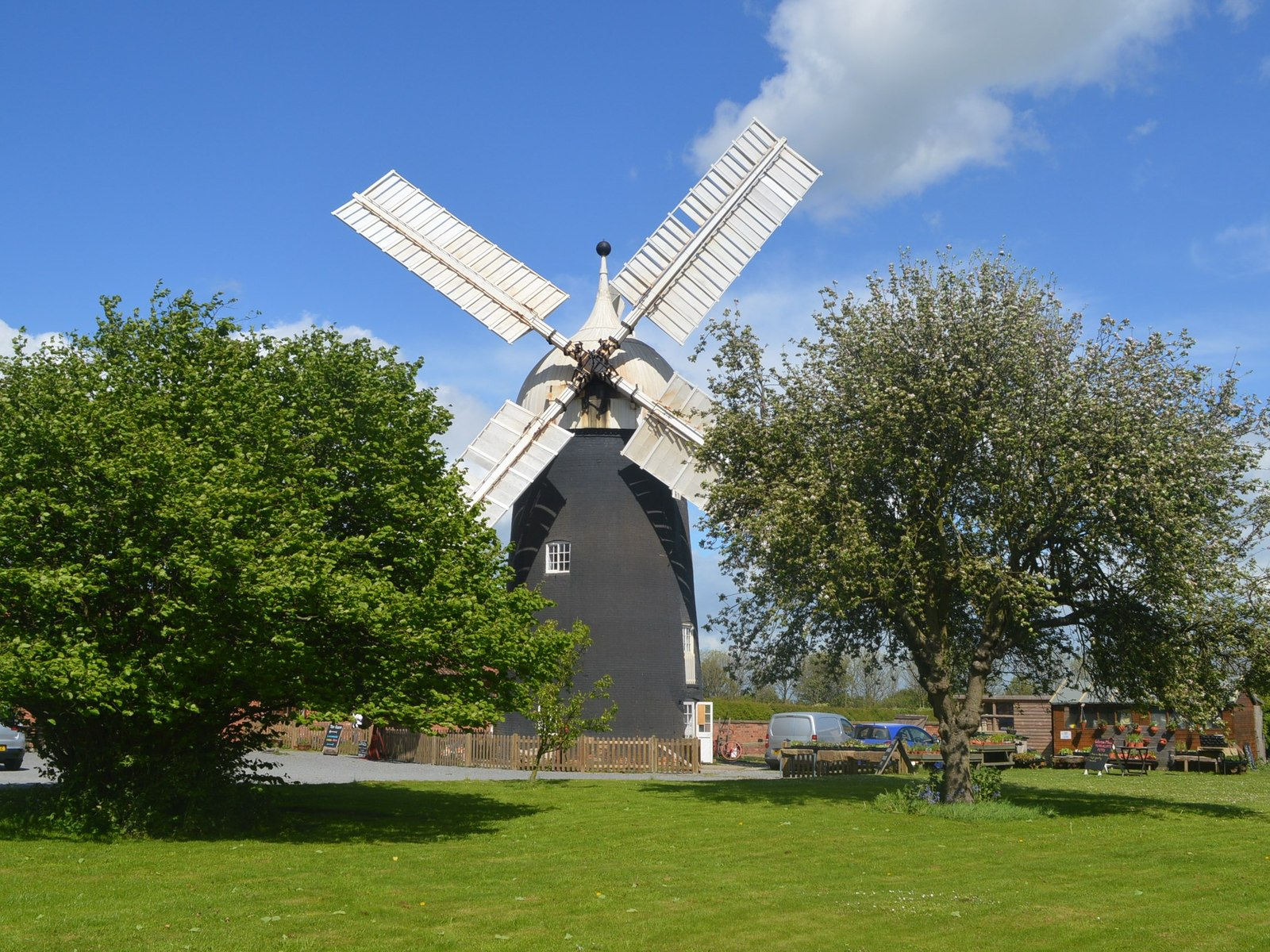
- St Nicholas's Church Eldon Street Windmill

- Location within Nottinghamshire
- Interactive map of Tuxford
- Area: 4.44 sq mi (11.5 km^{2})
- Population: 2,809 (2021)
  - Density: 633/sq mi (244/km^{2})
- OS grid reference: SK 7370
  - London: 120 mi (190 km) SSE
- Civil parish: Tuxford
- District: Bassetlaw
- Shire county: Nottinghamshire
- Region: East Midlands
- Country: England
- Sovereign state: United Kingdom
- Post town: NEWARK
- Postcode district: NG22
- Dialling code: 01777
- Police: Nottinghamshire
- Fire: Nottinghamshire
- Ambulance: East Midlands
- UK Parliament: Newark
- Website: www.tuxfordtowncouncil.gov.uk

Tuxford is a historic market town and a civil parish in the Bassetlaw district of Nottinghamshire, England. It had a population of 2,809 in the 2021 census.

== Geography ==
Its nearby towns are Ollerton, Retford, Worksop, Mansfield and Newark-on-Trent. The nearest cities are Lincoln, Sheffield and Doncaster. The town is located near the border with Lincolnshire in The Dukeries.

The A6075 passes through east–west and connects the A57 to Ollerton and Mansfield. The East Coast Main Line passes close to the east. The A611 previously went east–west through the town; this is now the A6075. The A611 now goes from Mansfield to Hucknall.

Tuxford in Bassetlaw

The Great North Road runs through the town (now B1164), though the majority of traffic now uses the modern A1 trunk road, which splits the town in two. The town was bypassed in 1967. The section of road, known as Carlton to Markham Moor, or the Sutton-on-Trent, Weston and Tuxford Bypass, was built by Robert McGregor & Sons, with concreting aggregates supplied by Hoveringham Gravels (later bought by Tarmac). The eight-mile section was authorised by Tom Fraser with a contract for £2.7 million, but ended up costing £3.4 million. The section is notable for the first use in British construction of the slip form paver using pervious concrete. The bridge sections came from Boulton & Paul Ltd in Norwich.

=== Tuxford bypass ===
The proposed (and modest) Tuxford bypass in 1958 was priced at only £204,000, only slightly more than the nearby Cromwell bypass at £150,000. In August 1960, the Cromwell to Markham Moor proposed bypass route was completely changed. Previously, the 1950s plan was to merely dual the main road, with a small bypass at Tuxford, and diversions at Weston and Scarthingmoor, but it was realised that all gaps should be closed, and that bridges should instead be built. The Tuxford bypass route was fixed on 16 April 1963, and the new route would leave the former 1950s route midway across the Carlton-on-Trent bypass.

Tuxford Bypass started in early December 1965, and was to finish by late 1966 or in early 1967. Construction started near Markham Moor at Sibthorpe Hill at East Markham. The former roundabout at Markham Moor was previously much more modest, so it was widened; the Markham Moor roundabout was designed for a possible bridge, but traffic flow was not big enough in 1965 for a bridge. The Cromwell bypass was largely finished by December 1965, so the Tuxford bypass started when the Cromwell bypass had finished. The contractor's depot was at Ashvale, to the south of Tuxford, next to the former Tuxford Central railway station. When building the roundabout at Markham Moor, traffic was diverted through East Markham. Concrete was made at Cromwell, being made from a Newark quarry, at 3,000 tons per day.

Wet weather delayed construction in October 1966. Earth-moving equipment came from Shellabear Price of Walton-on-Thames. The bridges were made by Conder (Midlands) Ltd, a structural steelwork company of Burton upon Trent. On Friday 30 September 1966, seventy five people from the International Road Federation, from a conference in London, travelled to Cromwell and Tuxford, to see the new slip form method.

The bypass opened on 14 July 1967, opened by Stephen Swingler, costing £3,035,658. The Tuxford parish council were not invited to the opening, due to long term heated disagreements over a lack of footbridge provision. Stephen Swingler had lunch in the Newcastle Arms. Also at the opening was the chairman of Nottinghamshire County Council, Albert Pounder, and the Bishop of Southwell and Nottingham Gordon Savage. The main road was now a dual-carriageway from Balderton to Bradbury, County Durham. Stephen Swingler also said that a £225,000 bridge for the B6387 at Twyford Bridge, to the north, was being planned, as it was an accident spot, being built around 1972

== History ==
Tuxford is listed in the Domesday Book as Tuxfarne, and was also historically known as 'Tuckers Ford'. In Daniel Defoe's eighteenth century work, A tour thro' the whole island of Great Britain, Tuxford is referred to as 'Tuxford in the Clays'; Defoe writes: 'Passing Newark Bridge, we went through the lower side of Nottinghamshire, keeping within the River Idle. Here we saw Tuxford in the Clays, that is to say, Tuxford in the Dirt, and a little dirty market town it is, suitable to its name.'

St Nicholas' Church is the Church of England parish church dates from the 12th century. From 1824 to 1849 the incumbency at St Nicholas was held by Rev. Edward Bishop Elliott, a distinguished theologian who, while in residence at Tuxford, authored an authoritative and widely read commentary on the biblical Book of Revelation, titled Horae Apocalypticae. Tuxford also has a Methodist church, whose current building was erected for another Free church in 1841.

Tuxford's local library is housed in a 17th-century building that was originally the Read Grammar School. The school was founded in 1669 by the bequest of Charles Read (1604–1669), who was born at Darlton about 3 miles (4.8 km) from Tuxford, and became a wealthy shipper in Hull. Students at the Free Grammar School were drawn from the local parish, and their education was free. Read also founded grammar schools at Corby Glen in Lincolnshire and Drax in Yorkshire. Read Grammar School in Tuxford closed in either 1912 or 1915. The building served for a time as a child welfare centre before becoming the local library.

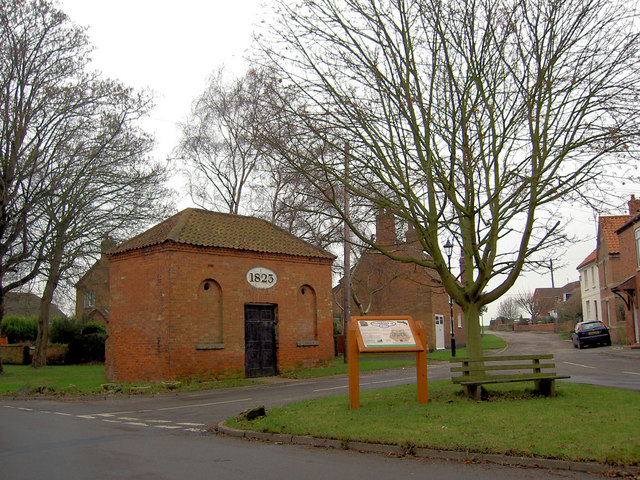
Tuxford Lock Up

Tuxford has a town lock-up, one of only three in Nottinghamshire. Built in 1823 it stands in Newcastle Street. It has two separate cells, one each for men and women, each with its own earth closet. Ventilation to each cell is via two circular holes, with iron bars on the front and back walls. In 1884 an extension was added to the back of the lock-up to house Tuxford's fire engine. Early maps show that also behind the lock-up was the town pinfold, which remained in use until the 1920s.

Dominion Steel and Coal Corporation (Dosco) made mining equipment in the town.

Tuxford Windmill is a tower windmill, built in 1820 and restored to working order between 1982 and 1993. It is open to visitors daily except Tuesdays throughout the year. The mill with its large white sails dominates Tuxford's skyline. The mill produces flour which is sold from the mill shop. The mill bakery produces cakes, soups & rolls. A wooden post mill once stood close by. It was moved from Grassthorpe in 1874, continued working until about 1926 and was demolished in 1950.

Stone Road End Mill was a brick-built four-storey tower windmill, built before 1840. The mill was out of use by 1906 and now only the 38-foot high tower remains.

In January 1454, Tuxford was the site of a meeting between the Duke of Exeter and Thomas Percy, Lord Egremont, in order to make a sworn confederation in furtherance of their common aims against the Neville family and Lord Cromwell. This was a critical alliance and event in ramping up the violence and tensions of the period, which would help lead to the outbreak of the Cousins War (Wars of the Roses) in 1455.

=== Railway stations ===
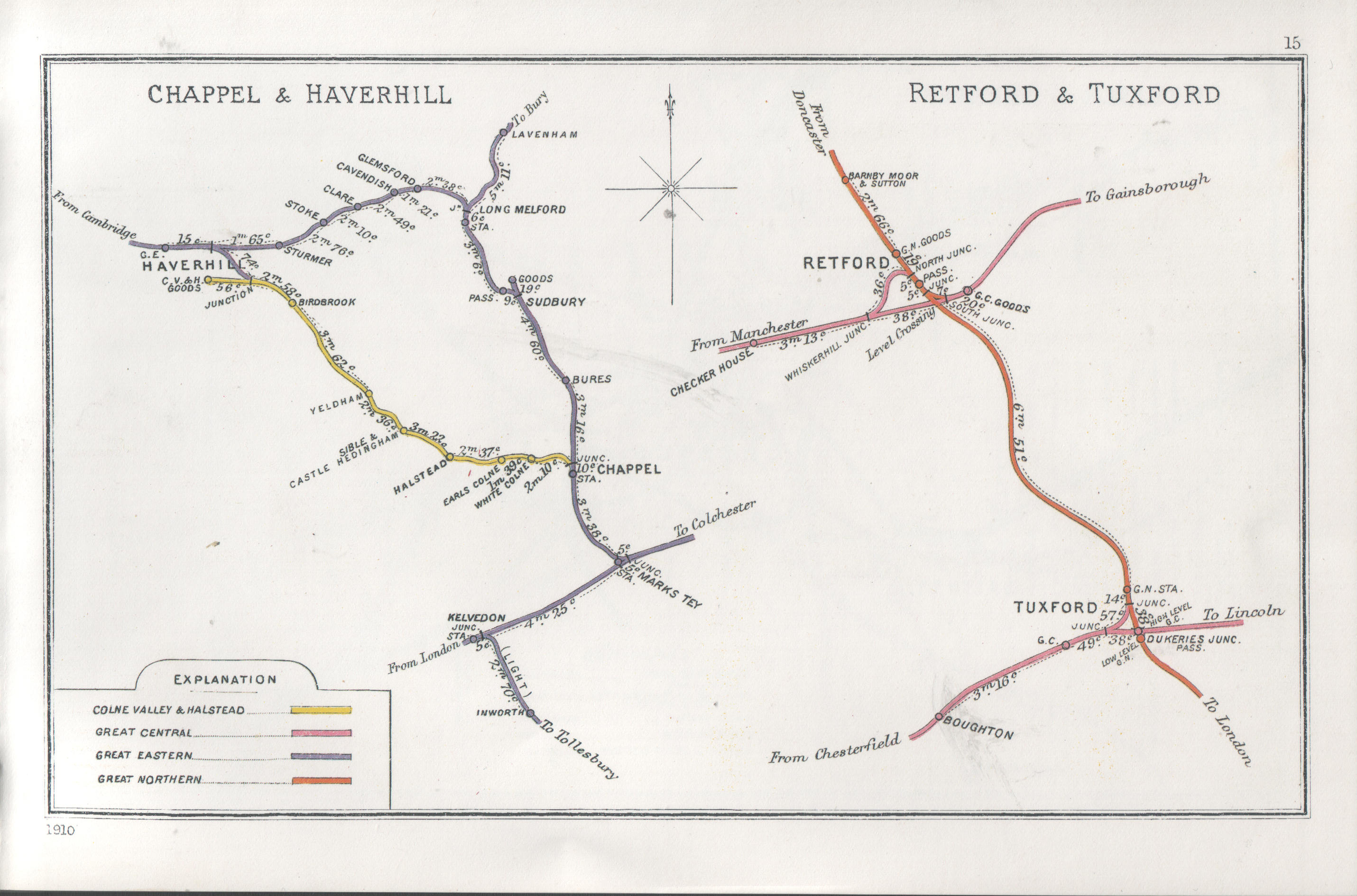
Former railway stations

Despite its size, Tuxford had three railway stations but all are now closed. The Great Northern Railway opened the East Coast Main Line through Tuxford in 1852. The GNR's station at Tuxford was served by local trains between Newark-on-Trent and Retford. In 1897 The Lancashire, Derbyshire and East Coast Railway opened its line through Tuxford, linking Sheffield and Chesterfield with Lincoln. The LDECR called its station Tuxford Town, and the GNR renamed its station Tuxford North. In 1907 the Great Central Railway took over the LDECR and renamed Tuxford Town Tuxford Central. Dukeries Junction station was built where the two railways cross, and was a split-level affair with platforms on both lines, existing solely as an interchange point surrounded by open fields with no proper road access. Its name was taken from The Dukeries district of Nottinghamshire.

In March 1950 British Railways closed Dukeries Junction station. It had had minimal use throughout its life. In July 1955 BR closed Tuxford North and withdrew passenger services from the former LDECR line in September of the same year, resulting in the closure of Tuxford Central. The former LD&ECR railway line has since been reopened by Network Rail in 2009 as the High Marnham Test Track for testing trains between Thoresby Jn and High Marnham at speeds of up to 75 mph, with extensive sidings and mock OHL electrification being built at Tuxford approximately 5 miles away from the former Tuxford Central Station.

== Amenities ==
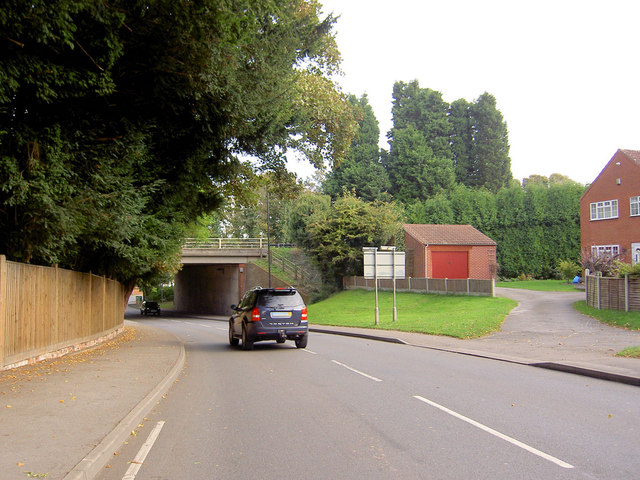
A1 bridge over A6075

The town contains small shops, three pubs, as well as a local church.

== Education ==
Tuxford Academy opened as a County Secondary School (secondary modern school) in 1958 and became a comprehensive in 1976. It performs very well compared with most of Nottinghamshire, and especially with most of Bassetlaw. Tuxford School recently underwent a full re-build, completed in March 2007. A company called Transform Schools (mainly represented by building company Balfour Beatty) spent millions of pounds re-building six secondary schools within the Bassetlaw area as part of a PFI funded project. The new Tuxford School is located on what used to be the old school field along with a field next to it which has been bought over. The site where the old school stood has now been converted into the new school playing field and nature areas.

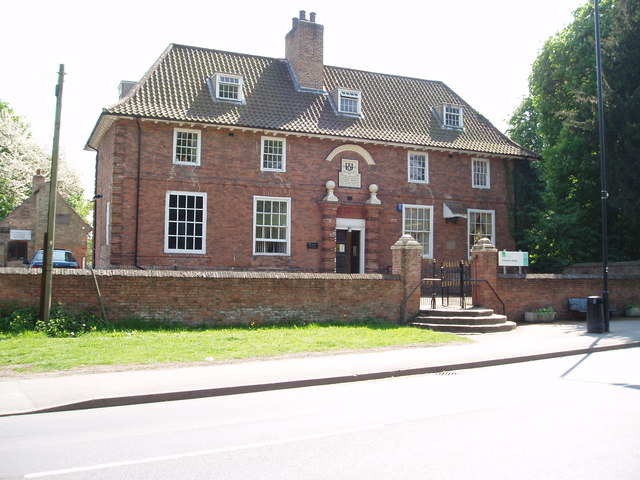
Former Read Grammar School, now the library

Tuxford Academy has had only five head teachers during its lifetime to date: Bernard Woodward, Keith Atkinson, Geoff Lloyd, Chris Pickering and current principal, David Cotton. The school has steadily increased in size (now 1450 students) and reputation, and is one of the highest performing state secondary schools in Nottinghamshire, having gained an OfSTED grade of 'outstanding' in May 2009 and in May 2012. It has been designated as a National Support School, is a specialist Technology College and Training School, and leads loose federations of secondary and primary schools in Nottinghamshire. It is well known for its welcoming atmosphere and innovative practices in education. Tuxford also has a community primary school.

== Media ==
Local news and television programmes are provided by BBC East Midlands and ITV Central. Television signals are received from the Waltham TV transmitter. BBC Yorkshire and Lincolnshire and ITV Yorkshire can also be received from the Belmont TV transmitter.

Local radio stations are BBC Radio Nottingham, Capital East Midlands and Smooth East Midlands.

The town is served by the local newspaper, Newark Advertiser.

== Sport ==
The footballer Craig Disley comes from Tuxford. He played for Mansfield Town 1999–2004 and now plays for Alfreton Town.

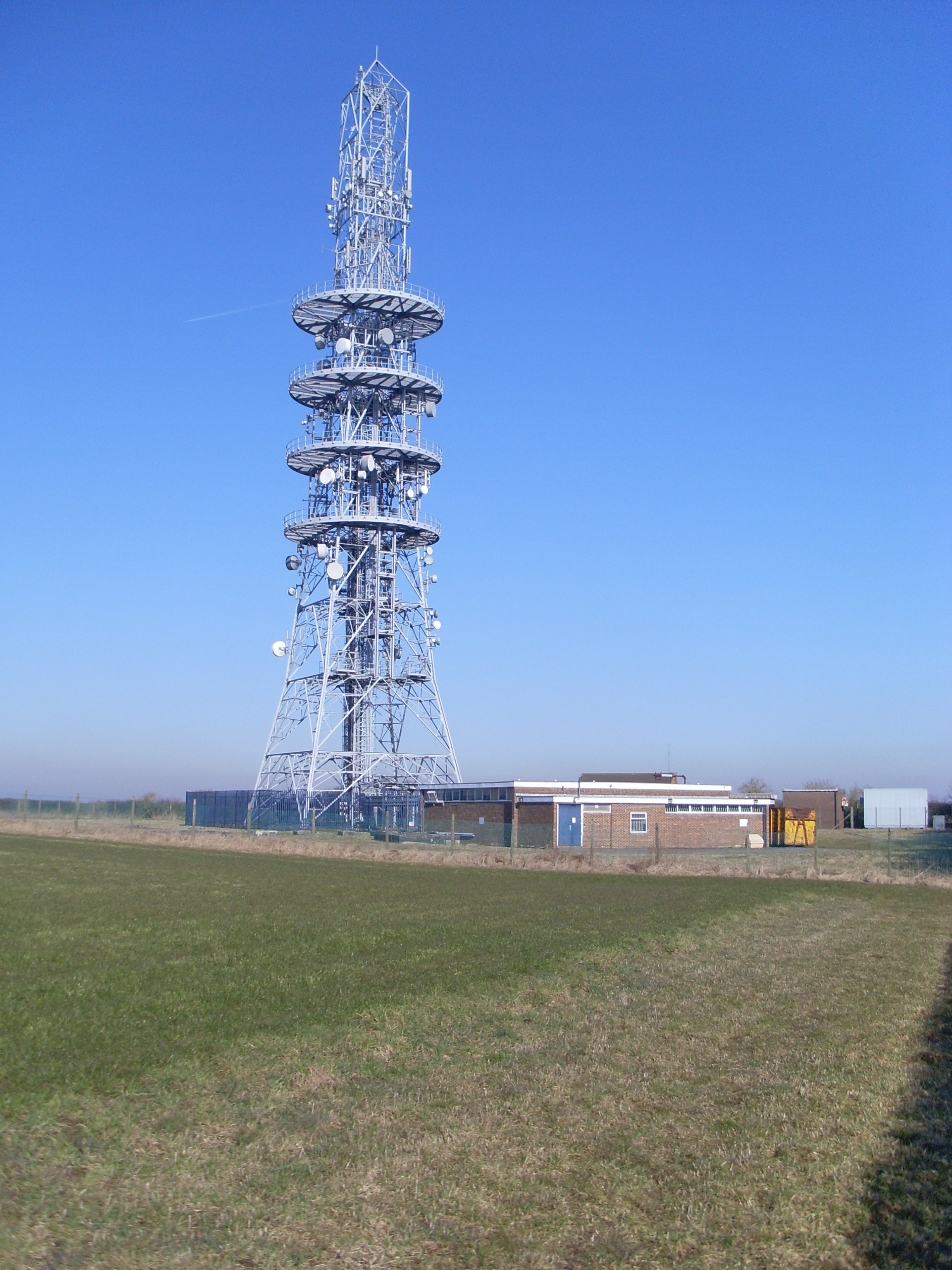
BT transmitter south of Farley's Wood, to the west

On 7 November 2011, the London 2012 Olympic Organising Committee announced that the Olympic Torch would travel through Tuxford on 28 June 2012 on its way from Lincoln to Nottingham.

Tuxford Clarion Cycling Club was formed in the town on 2 May 2013, and runs time trial races around Tuxford and also regular club runs on a Sunday morning at 9am from outside the Sun Inn. They run three groups of riders ranging from 15 mph to 19 mph average, with rides from 35 miles to 60 miles each week. The Tuxford Clarion Cycling Club is a section of the famous National Clarion Cycling Club founded in 1894 one of the oldest most historic cycling clubs in the world. The club is also affiliated with national racing governing bodies of British Cycling and Cycling Time Trials. New riders are welcomed to join the club for three trial rides before joining.

== Conservation ==
The parish contains 27 listed buildings that are recorded in the National Heritage List for England. Of these, one is listed at Grade I, the highest of the three grades, one is at Grade II*, the middle grade, and the others are at Grade II, the lowest grade.
