= Tuxford Academy =

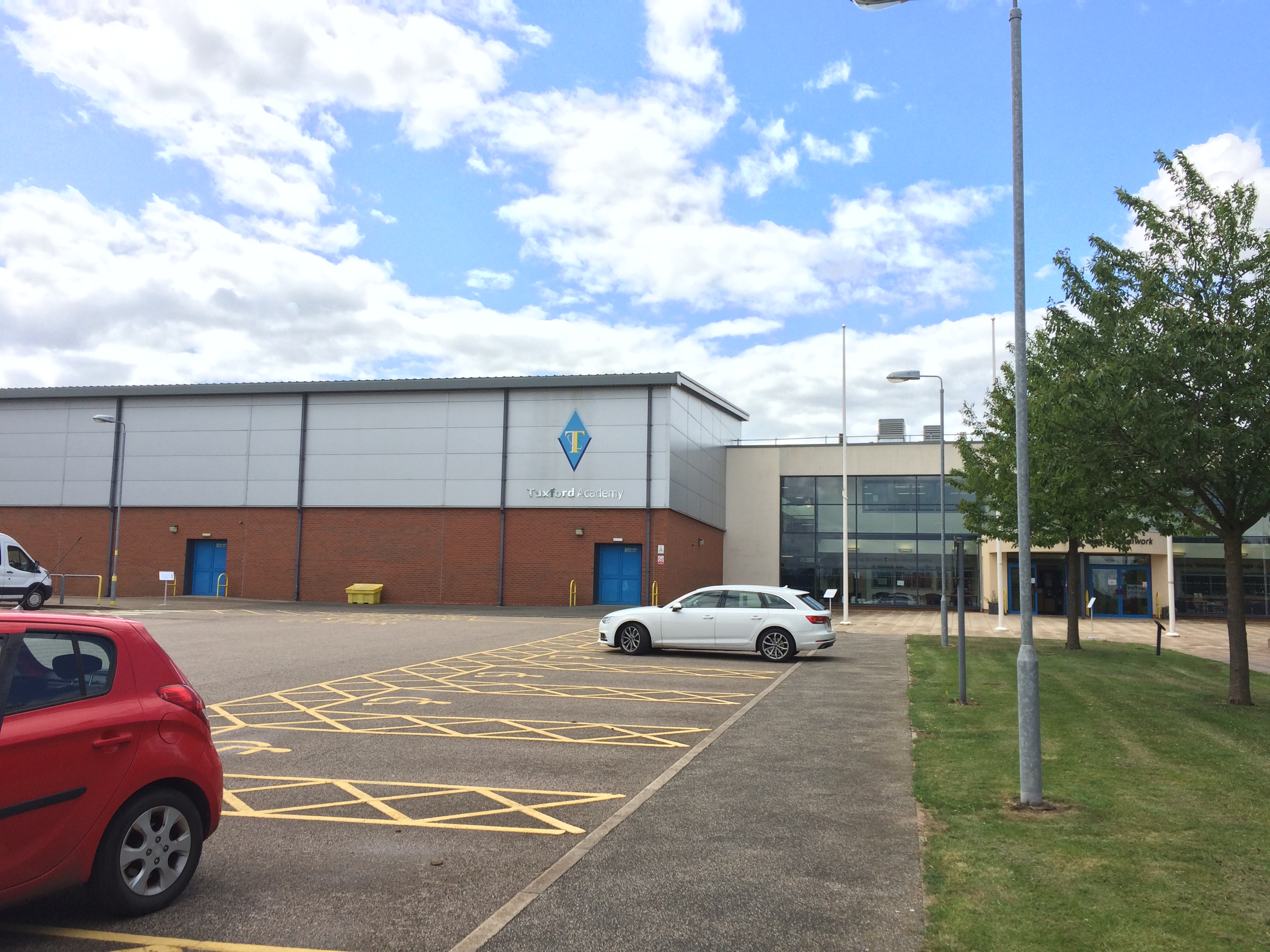

Location
- Marnham Road; Tuxford, Nottinghamshire, NG22 0JH; England; 53.23147°N 0.88364°W

Information
- Type: Academy
- Motto: Excellence through Teamwork
- Established: 1958
- Trust: Diverse Academies Learning Partnership
- Department for Education URN: 137319 Tables
- Ofsted: Reports
- Principal: Jon Hardy
- Gender: Mixed
- Age: 11 to 18
- Enrolment: 1,517
- Houses: Beech, Oak, Ash, Willow
- Website: www.tuxford-ac.org.uk

Tuxford Academy (formerly Tuxford School) is a mixed secondary school and sixth form located in Tuxford in the English county of Nottinghamshire.

It first opened as a County Secondary School (secondary modern school) in 1958, specialising in Rural Studies with an attached farming unit. The school became a comprehensive in 1976 and opened a sixth form in 1980. In 2002 the school became a Technology College and in 2007 it was designated as a Training school. Tuxford School underwent a full re-build completed in March 2007. The new building is located on what had previously been the school field, and an additional field adjacent to it. The site where the old school stood has now been converted into the new school playing field and nature areas.

Previously a community school administered by Nottinghamshire County Council, Tuxford School converted to academy status on 1 August 2011 and was renamed Tuxford Academy. However the school continues to coordinate with Nottinghamshire County Council for admissions. Tuxford Academy offers GCSEs and BTECs as programmes of study for pupils, while students in the sixth form have the option to study from a range of A Levels and further BTECs.

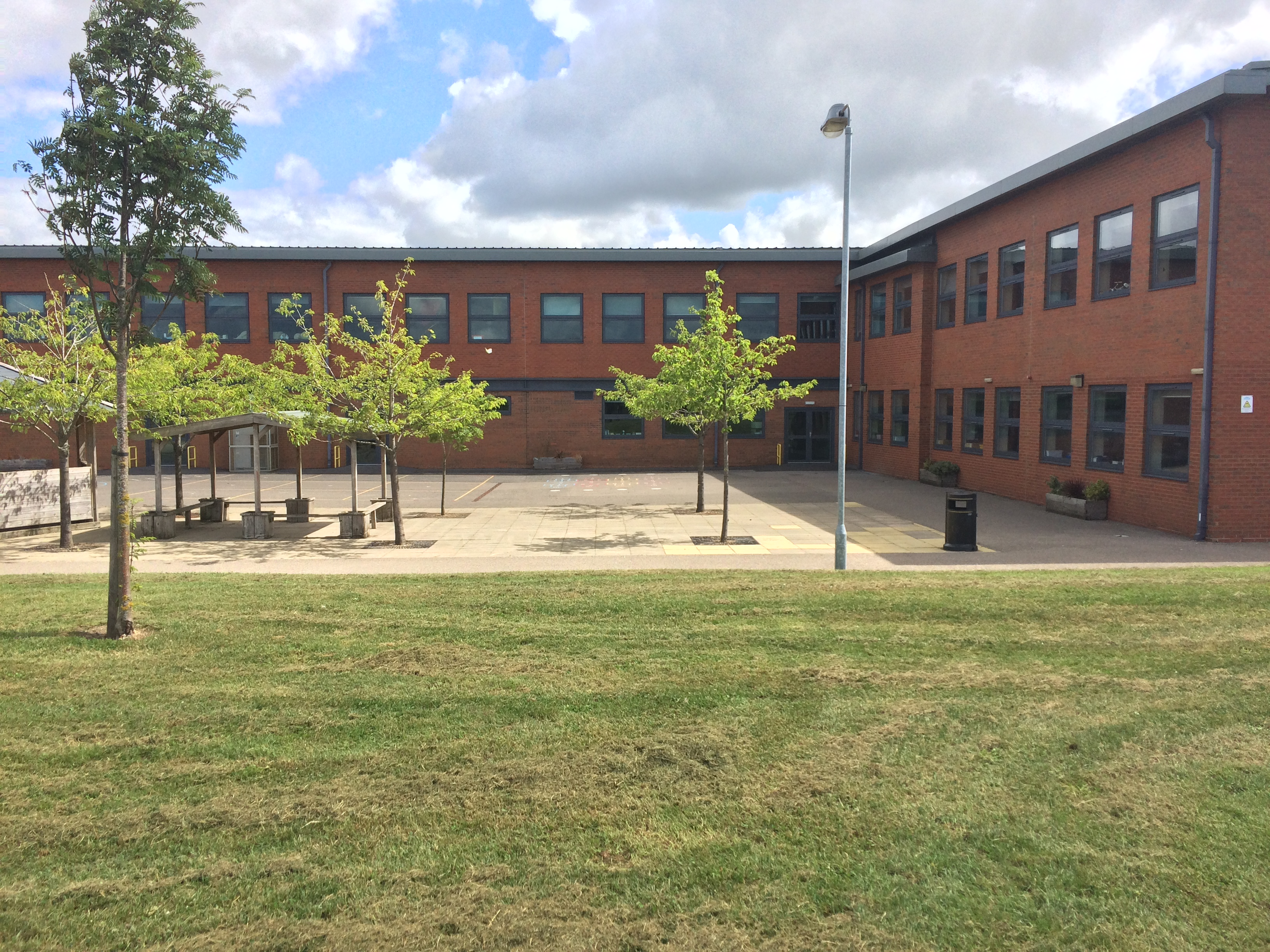
The Back of Tuxford Academy

== Notable former pupils ==
- Elspeth Gibson, fashion designer
