= Dido (train) =

In British railway parlance Dido trains were typically provided to transport workers to a remote place of railway employment on a Day in, day out basis.

The most common provision of this nature was to engine sheds away from centres of population where substantial numbers of staff would need to travel to or from work at times when other forms of public transport were not available. An example of this was the "Annesley Dido" which served the Great Central Railway-built Annesley engine shed north of Nottingham from at least 1929 to 8 September 1962.

A variant on this theme occurred to and from Langwith Junction engine shed in Derbyshire. This service was provided after Tuxford engine shed closed in 1959, when many Tuxford staff were transferred to work at Langwith Junction.

== Workmen's trains ==
Dido trains were a variant within the broad class of workmen's trains which were provided by railways from their early days until well after the Second World War. Such trains ran to meet the needs of people working at establishments with significant numbers signing on and off at given times, such as collieries, factories, quarries, docks and railway workshops. Such trains were often made up of substandard coaching stock hauled by ancient locomotives, with occasional exceptions when a service's customary locomotive was indisposed. By the nature of their destinations such trains often required special platforms or other stopping places, which usually did not appear on public timetables and did not cater for the general public. Like the rolling stock, these stations were typically substandard, amounting in some cases to an agreed stopping point where users clambered to and from the trackside.

Where public stations existed near places of employment some workmen's trains called, usually not shown on the station's public timetable. Occasionally workmen's carriages were attached to regular service trains.

Whatever the variety of workmen's service used, passengers bought "workmen's tickets" at significantly reduced fares.

== Examples ==
Many workmen's services existed over the years. Examples were provided by:

- the Festiniog and Blaenau Railway to Duffws (F&BR) for the quarries at Blaenau Ffestiniog
- the Great Western Railway to Blaenau Ffestiniog Central for the quarries at Blaenau Ffestiniog
- the Lowca Light Railway to Lowca for the colliery, washery and coking plant at Lowca
- the London and North Western Railway to Parton Halt for the same places
- the London and North Western Railway along the Willis Branch to Huyton Quarry
- the London, Midland and Scottish Railway to ROF Chorley
- contractors to Immingham Halt whilst Immingham Docks were under construction
- the Padarn Railway to the Dinorwic Slate Quarries
- the Penrhyn Quarry Railway to the Penrhyn Quarry
- the Great Central Railway to Wigan Central and from Bulwell Common to Hollin Well and Annesley
- Trafford Park Estates Co.from Barton to the Third Avenue tram route
- British Railways to Island Road for Barrow docks
- the Cleator and Workington Junction Railway to Keekle Colliers' Platform and Moresby Junction Halt for Walkmill Colliery
