= High Marnham Power Station =

Former coal-fired power station in England

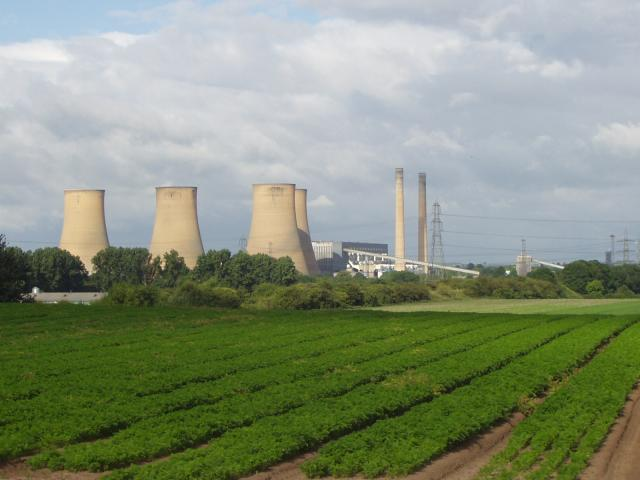
- High Marnham Power Station; Viewed from the east in July 2004
- Country: England
- Location: High Marnham, Nottinghamshire, East Midlands, NG23 6SE
- Coordinates: 53.229020°N 0.792565°W
- Status: Decommissioned and Demolished
- Construction began: 1954
- Commission date: 1959
- Decommission date: 2003
- Construction cost: £50m (1962)
- Operators: Central Electricity Generating Board (1959–1990); Powergen (1990–2002); E.ON UK (2002–2003)

Thermal power station
- Primary fuel: Coal
- Chimneys: 2
- Cooling towers: 5
- Cooling source: River Trent; Cooling Towers

Power generation
- Nameplate capacity: 1000 MW

External links
- Commons: Related media on Commons

High Marnham Power Station was a coal fuelled power station in Nottinghamshire, to the west of the River Trent, approximately 0.5 miles (0.8 km) north of the village of High Marnham. Construction site clearance began in November 1955, No. 1 Unit power generation commenced in October 1959 and at the time it was the biggest turbine in the UK. The station became fully operational in June 1962. The plant operated until 2003 when it was decommissioned, though the cooling towers weren't demolished until 2012.

High Marnham was the most southerly of three power stations which lined the River Trent, known locally as Megawatt Valley, the others being West Burton and Cottam. It was the first 1000 MW [946 MW net] power station built and commissioned in Europe; it operated at higher boiler pressure and temperatures than earlier plants.

== Construction ==
High Marnham was first proposed in 1953 by design engineer Stanley Brown. The station was constructed by the Central Electricity Generating Board Northern Project Group, on a green field site. Work started in 1954, with groundworks on the site of Barks Farm, which was demolished the following year. The main civil engineering practice for the construction was Freeman Fox & Partners. The work was overseen by resident engineer Douglas Derbyshire who later went on to construct the nearby West Burton Power Station. The main contractor during construction was Alfred McAlpine. The station was commissioned in 1959 and was fully operational by June 1962. The plant was officially opened on Friday 5 October 1962 by Sir Stanley Brown (F.H.S. Brown), now the deputy chairman of the CEGB.

== Boiler plant ==
The plant was designed and built by International Combustion Ltd. Five boiler units, each weighing about 14,000 tons, were suspended on beams and support columns, for a vertical expansion of 8 inches (200 mm). Each boiler was built in twin furnace construction with 1.5 inch (38mm) bore tubes, all connected to a common drum at the top of the boiler, and fitted with safety valves set at 2,500 pounds per square inch (17,000 kPa). One furnace carried the superheat pendants, connected to the boiler drum top and to an outlet header, fitted with a safety valve set at 2,450 pounds per square inch (16,900 kPa). The second furnace carried the reheat pendants connected to an inlet header from the HP cylinder exhaust and to an outlet header to the turbine IP cylinder. The lower section of the furnace corners contained a wind box with the pulverised fuel nozzles and retractable oil burners. Fuel nozzles and burners were aligned at an imaginary circle in the furnace ensuring an even heat distribution. Pulverised fuel nozzles were provided with vertical movement to control temperature conditions. At the bottom of each furnace, the front and rear wall tubes were formed into an inward slope where the tubes were bent back (forming a nose and gap) to their original vertical wall alignment terminating at their front and rear bottom furnace water tube headers. A steel skirt was fitted around each furnace base.

Water circulation within the boiler furnace was assisted by fully immersed electrical pumps manufactured by Hayward Tyler Co. Four Lopulco coal roller mills with pulverised coal fans per boiler were located in the boiler house basement. Coal was fed from overhead bunkers by speed-regulated drum feeders to the mills and crushed to fine dust by three 7.5 ton roller drums per mill, then blown into the wind boxes through pipework and the PF nozzles. Combustion air was delivered by two forced draught fans located above the coal bunkers, taking warm air from above the boiler roof casing and discharging it though rotating heat exchangers to the furnace wind boxes. Hot gas was drawn from the furnaces through the pendants, water tube economisers, rotating heat exchanger, cyclone dust collectors and electrostatic precipitators by two induced draught fans before entering the chimney flue ducts and passing up the 500 feet (150 m) high chimneys.

Heavy combustion products fell into basement mounted hoppers with water troughs under each furnace that engaged with the bottom furnace header casing skirt. The hoppers were emptied by a water jet/sluice arrangement into an ash receiving pit.

== Boiler water feed system ==
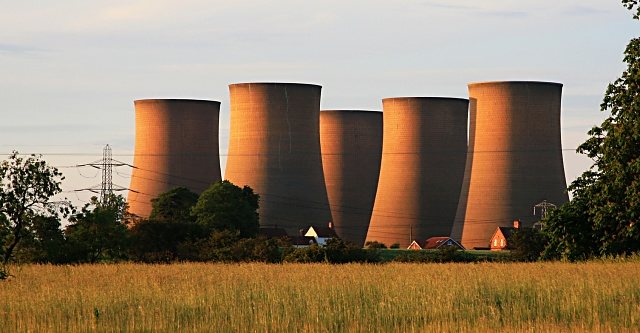
Cooling towers in June 2006

Condensed steam was taken from the turbine condenser and pumped back into the boiler feed system, via the unit evaporator, low and high pressure water tube heaters (after being subjected to bled steam heat from turbine cylinders) into a de-aerator. The de-aerated water was taken by the main feed pump (multi stage cartridge design pump or a smaller start up pump) and discharged at 3,000 pounds per square inch (21,000 kPa) into the boiler water feed system through feed regulating valves. Both feed pump types were electric motor driven. Additional station boiler feed water supply could also be made up by the station water treatment plant and fed into the de-aerator, this was operated and controlled by the station chemistry department.

== Turbine/generator plant ==
Designed and built by the English Electric Co., five steam turbine units of high pressure, intermediate pressure and double-flow low pressure turbine cylinders were coupled to 200 MW generators. These were the first units at this size on the UK grid system with the first set ordered in early 1955.

At the end of May 1959, the first turbo-generator stator left English Electric at Stafford, for one of the 200 MW 3,000 rpm units. It weighed 220 tons, thought to be the heaviest electrical equipment transported in the UK. The third 200 MW unit was installed in December 1960.

The steam flow into the turbine was regulated by the hydraulically controlled steam inlet valves to maintain a generating speed of 3000 RPM. The turbine over-speed protection was by weight eccentric rings on the turbine shaft, set to throw-out at a predetermined RPM and shutting the high pressure cylinder inlet steam valves. Exhaust flow from the HP turbine cylinders passed to the boiler for reheating (with some having been bled off to feed heaters), returned to the intermediate pressure cylinder (with some bled off to low pressure feed heaters) and exhausted from the double-flow LP cylinder under vacuum into underslung water-cooled condensers. Condenser cooling water was delivered from a sub-basement ring main around the turbine house. The turbine/generator assembly was mounted on reinforced concrete pedestals that ran along the length of the turbine hall. High Marnham was one of the CEGB's twenty steam power stations with the highest thermal efficiency; in 1963–4 the thermal efficiency was 33.66 per cent, 33.31 per cent in 1964–5, and 32.93 per cent in 1965–6. The annual electricity output of High Marnham was:

Electricity output of High Marnham
Year	1960–1	1961–2	1962–3	1963–4	1964–5	1965–6	1966–7	1971–2	1978–9	1980–1	1981–2
Electricity supplied, GWh	1,306	3,609	4,472	5,080	5,184	5,569	5,405	4,246	3,264	3,945	3,619

== National Grid ==
On 15 December 1963, the first 400kV supergrid link in the UK's National Grid was switched on between the power station and the Monk Fryston substation, near the Selby Fork on the A63 road towards Fairburn, North Yorkshire - a distance of 64 miles. This line was mainly experimental; the 420-ton transformers at either end were from English Electric at Stafford. The main 400kV supergrid was not switched on until around 1965, with the 4ZA power line (Grendon to Elstree).

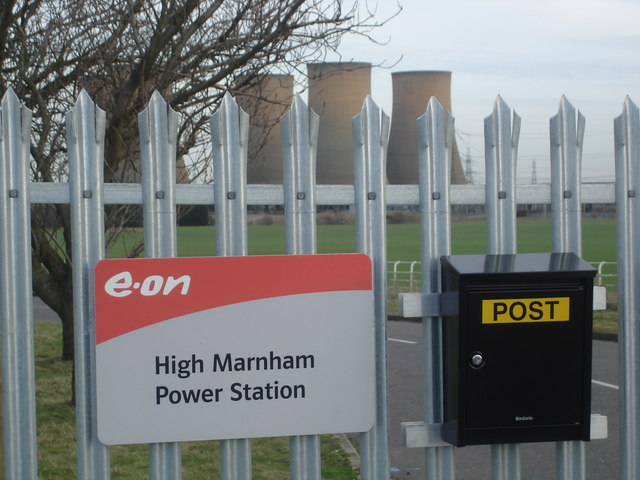
E.ON sign in February 2008

== Cooling water plant ==
Cooling water pumps were located between cooling towers in a purpose made building to deliver cooling water into a ring main for the turbine condensers. The warm water was passed on through to the five 350 feet (110 m) cooling towers, falling into the tower moats to be channelled back through screens and a chlorination process to the pump suctions for recirculation. Water loss through evaporation was made up from the river Trent by suction screened pumps. It required around 27 million gallons of water an hour.

== Coal plant ==
High Marnham power station was supplied with coal via the 14-mile High Marnham branch off the Mansfield to Worksop line (later marketed as the Robin Hood railway line). Prior to their closure Thoresby, Welbeck, Ollerton, Bevercotes, Clipstone, Mansfield, Rufford, Blidworth and Bilsthorpe collieries were also connected to the High Marnham Branch. Rail facilities at High Marnham included weighbridges, sidings and coal hoppers, a control room, coal wagon marshalling yard and conveyor systems. In about 1965 a "merry-go-round" system of automatic coal wagon unloading was installed to evaluate for future "Stations Systems". Bunker coal supply ran from the coal plant on inclined conveyors to the boiler house, where it was fed onto a moving "feed head" conveyor above the individual boiler coal bunkers. The plant burnt around 10,000 tonnes of coal a day. When it was commissioned in October 1962 it was the largest power station in Europe, consuming coal from 17 collieries. The two chimneys were 450 feet (140 m) high. A pipeline was built to take ash across the Trent five miles to former gravel pits at Besthorpe, Nottinghamshire.

== Closure and demolition ==
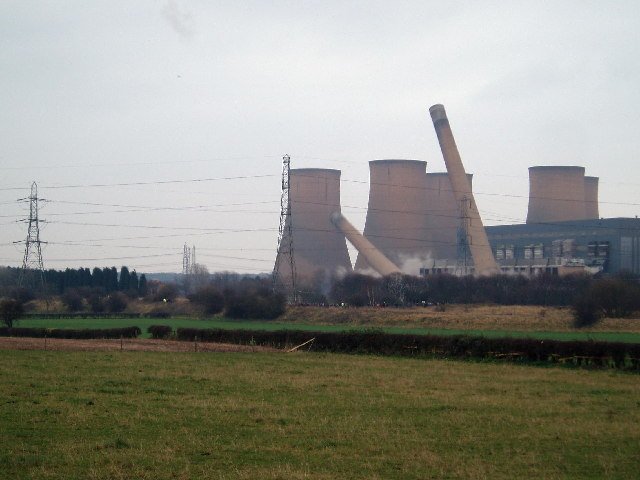
Demolition of chimneys on 15 December 2004

The station closed in 2003 after nearly 45 years in operation, with a loss of 119 jobs. The station's chimneys were demolished on 15 December 2004. The station's 150 feet (46 m)-high boiler house was demolished on 5 October 2006. The station's five cooling towers were demolished on 15 July 2012 at 10:00.

In late 2009, the railway connection that used to supply coal to the power station became Network Rail's High Marnham Test Track for innovation and development, suited to this purpose because the line consists of continuously welded rail on concrete sleepers.
