= High Marnham Test Track =

Railway test track

Coordinates: 53.225389°N 0.881288°W

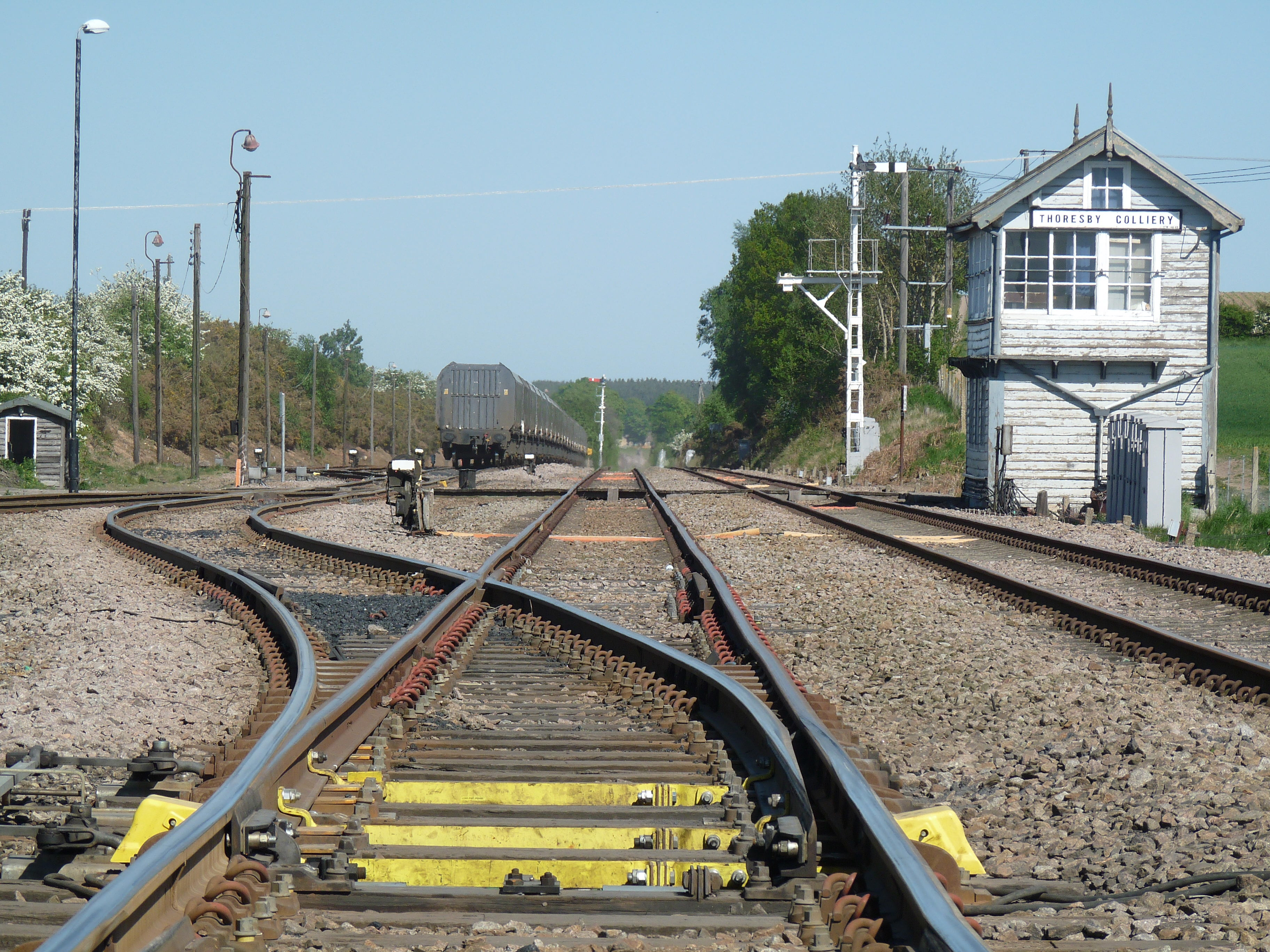
Thoresby Colliery Junction and signal box. Colliery trains turn left into the siding, while the double-track test track begins straight ahead

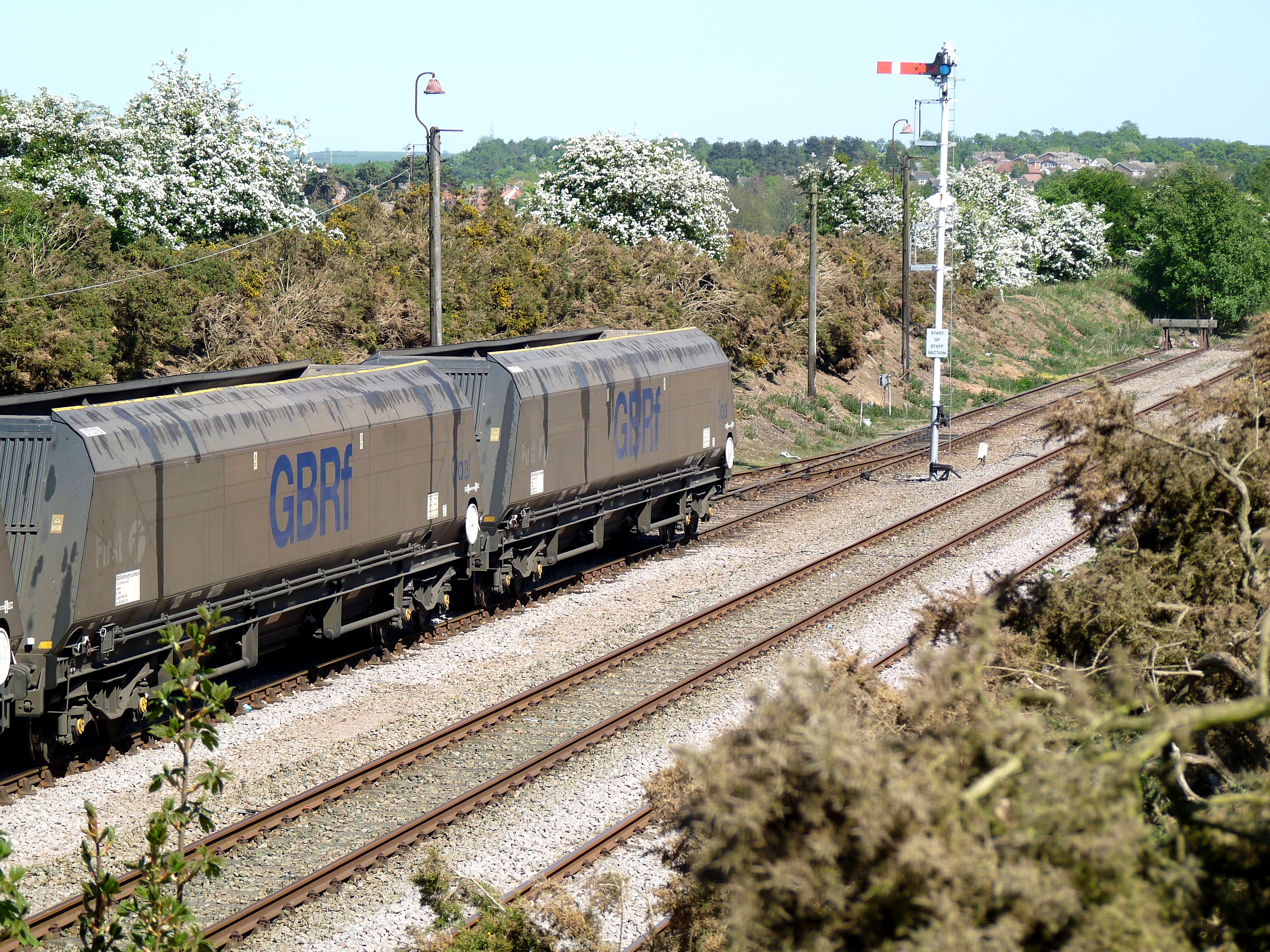
"Start of Staff Section" sign on the last signal post marking the start of the unsignalled test track main line.

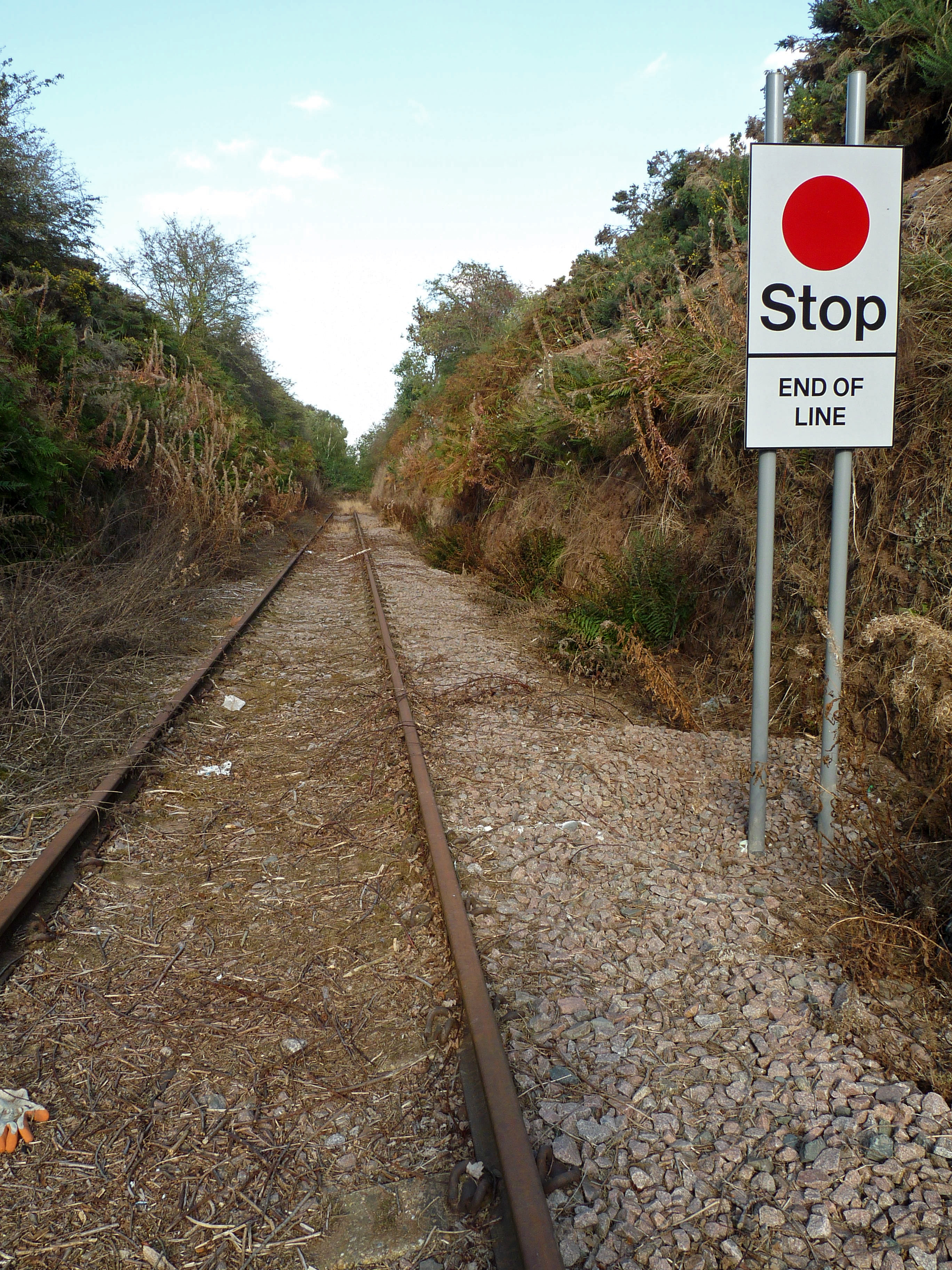
North limit of clearance on the Bevercotes Colliery Branch section of the test track in 2012, just north of Boughton Brake Tunnel

The High Marnham Test Track is a linear railway test track created in 2009 and centred on Lodge Lane, Tuxford, in Nottinghamshire in the United Kingdom. It houses Network Rail's Rail Innovation & Development Centre (RIDC), originally known as the Rail Vehicle Development Centre (RVDC). The main route is approximately 14 miles (23 km) long and rated for speeds up to 75 miles per hour (120 km/h). It is primarily formed of a 10 1/2-mile (17 km) former section of the Lancashire, Derbyshire and East Coast Railway running between Thoresby Colliery Junction at the western end, and High Marnham Power Station at the eastern end. Additionally a 4-mile (6 km) branchline diverges northwards over the Bevercotes Colliery Branch via Boughton Brake Tunnel to Bevercotes.

The main test track passes on a bridge directly over the East Coast Main Line, at the location of the former Dukeries Junction interchange station, but without a rail connection being provided. Instead the test track is accessed from the national British railway network via Shirebrook Junction on the Robin Hood Line and the existing line from there to Thoresby Colliery Junction. Access for trains is protected by an Annett's key under the supervision of an Engineering Technical Officer. There is no signalling on the line owing to theft and vandalism, including the previous destruction of the Ollerton Colliery signal box.

== Re-opening ==
On 10 February 2009 975025 Caroline visited the line on inspection duties prior to re-opening. Network Rail announced their intention for the reopening between Thoresby Colliery Junction and High Marnham on 10 July 2009. In August 2009 Network Rail stated that because the route of the line would now be maintained, it might increase the likelihood of being able to restore a passenger service in connection with Robin Hood Line services at a later date.

In November 2011 local people were reminded about the operational nature of the test track following acts of trespass.

During 2012 the Branch Line Society announced their intention to run a railtour covering the main test track and special steep gradients; plus the Bevercotes Branch to a distance of 2 miles 10 chains (3.4 km). Such a tour ran on 5 January 2013.

This line has been identified by Campaign for a Better Transport as a priority 1 candidate for reopening.

=== Facilities ===
The test track includes short sections of non-energised 25 kV AC railway electrification and non-energised third/fourth rail, a W6A loading gauge, and facilities for ERA Technical Specifications for Interoperability (TSI) noise testing.

An area of special track exists for RIS-1530-PLT testing of on-track plant, including lengths of track for brake testing at up to 1:25 and sharp 80-metre (4-chain) reverse curves. The Lodge Lane area also contains portacabins for visiting staff, and a 300-square-metre (3,200 sq ft) inspection shed for railway vehicles.

=== Projects ===
In March 2012 braking tests were undertaken for fitments of improved hydraulic brakes to 450 road-rail vehicle excavators. These excavators were all falling under classification "type 9b" where the rubber wheel touch small flanged steel wheels, which in-turn touch the rails and were found to have significantly reduced braking performance in adverse conditions.

In August 2012 the line was used for the testing of RFID and iPad-based "Virtual Lineside Signalling". Funding came from a Department of Transport £100,000-grant to investigate the possibility for low cost system for locations where European Rail Traffic Management System installation is not viable. RFID tags are placed on the track, and contact with a central signalling location is maintained by using encryption over traditional GSM networks and off-the-shelf portable computers used for the cab display.

In October 2013 a new high output "factory train" which will be used on Great Western Main Line electrification is due to be brought from Germany to the test track for trialling and staff familiarisation.

== Sources ==
- Clifton, Paul (2013). Harris, Nigel (ed.). "Network". RAIL (727). Peterborough: Bauer Consumer Media.
