= The Iron Duke (film) =

1934 film

- Directed by: Victor Saville
- Written by: H. M. Harwood; Bess Meredyth
- Produced by: Michael Balcon
- Starring: George Arliss; Ellaline Terriss; Gladys Cooper
- Cinematography: Curt Courant
- Edited by: Ian Dalrymple
- Music by: Louis Levy
- Distributed by: Gainsborough Pictures (UK)
- Release dates: 30 November 1934 (London); January 1935 (US)
- Running time: 88 minutes
- Country: United Kingdom
- Language: English
- Budget: £125,000

The Iron Duke is a 1934 British historical film directed by Victor Saville and starring George Arliss, Ellaline Terriss and Gladys Cooper. Arliss plays Arthur Wellesley, 1st Duke of Wellington, in the events leading up to the Battle of Waterloo and beyond.

It was the first British movie for George Arliss.

== Plot ==
With Napoleon defeated and exiled, the reluctant Duke of Wellington is persuaded by Lord Castelreagh to represent Great Britain's interests at the Congress of Vienna, where the victorious allies will decide the future of Europe. While there, his friend the Duchess of Richmond introduces the married man to the pretty Lady Frances Webster, an ardent admirer, at her ball. During the course of the evening, however, Wellington receives an urgent message: Napoleon has escaped and has landed in France. (Note: In real life at the time of the ball Lady Frances Webster was heavily pregnant with her second child who would be christened Charles Byron and was born in Paris on 28 August 1815.)

French King Louis XVIII and his niece and most trusted adviser, Madame, the Duchess d'Angoulême, are not alarmed in the least. Ney, formerly one of Napoleon's marshals, volunteers to take 4000 picked men and capture his former leader. However, he switches sides, and the majority of Frenchmen follow suit.

With France once again under Napoleon's control, both sides race to gather their armies. Napoleon routs the Prussians under Marshal Blücher before coming to grips with his old nemesis Wellington at the Battle of Waterloo. At the crucial point of the battle, Blücher's timely arrival turns the tide, and Napoleon is defeated for the final time.

The allies occupy France and gather in Paris to divide the spoils. Once again, Castelreagh sends Wellington to try to restrain the others from punishing France too severely in order to ensure a lasting peace. Wellington's task is made more difficult by the opposition of Madame, who is certain he wants to rule France himself.

Wellington warns Louis that Madame's desire to have the still-popular Ney executed for treason would risk another revolution. Madame arranges for Wellington's recall to London to answer a newspaper story that he is carrying on an affair with Lady Frances. Wellington soon disproves the claim, but while he is gone, Ney is convicted and shot by firing squad. The French people are outraged. Upon his return, Wellington forces the King to dismiss his advisers, including Madame.

Back in London, Wellington has to defend his decision to accept no reparations for his country.

== Cast ==
- George Arliss as Arthur Wellesley, Duke of Wellington
- Ellaline Terriss as Catherine Wellesley, Duchess of Wellington
- Gladys Cooper as Madame, Duchess d'Angoulême
- A. E. Matthews as Lord Hill
- Allan Aynesworth as Louis XVIII
- Lesley Wareing as Lady Frances Webster
- Emlyn Williams as Bates, the reporter who writes the story that bedevils Wellington
- Edmund Willard as Marshal Ney
- Norma Varden as Charlotte Lennox, Duchess of Richmond
- Felix Aylmer as Lord Uxbridge
- Gerald Lawrence as Lord Castelreagh
- Gibb McLaughlin as Talleyrand
- Farren Soutar as Count Metternich
- Walter Sondes as James Wedderburn Webster, Lady Frances' jealous husband
- Frederick Leister as King of Prussia
- Gyles Isham as Czar of Russia
- Annie Esmond as Denise
- Paddy Naismith as Lady Frances' Maid (as Paddie Naismith)
- Ernest Jay as First Orderly
- G. H. Mulcaster as First Delegate
- Frank Freeman as Second Delegate
- Franklin Dyall as Marshal Blücher
- Campbell Gullan as D'Artois
- Norman Shelley as Pozzo di Borgo
- Peter Gawthorne as Duke of Richmond

== Production ==
=== Development ===
George Arliss had become a movie star in Hollywood playing famous historical figures such as Disraeli, and Voltaire. The Iron Duke was his first British movie. It was made by the British studio Gaumont-British, then under Michael Balcon. Arliss' fee was reportedly £40,000. Variety reported he signed a three-picture deal with Gaumont worth $125,000 a film. Balcon recalled Arliss' contract "gave Arliss everything he wanted: story approval, cast approval, director approval, a limited working day with an inflexible 3.45 p.m. interval for tea, which was pretty unreasonable as the limited working day came to an end very soon after tea in any case."

Arliss wrote in his memoirs that he discussed various possible projects at Gaumont including The Forsyte Saga and biopics of Pepys and Horatio Nelson before deciding on the Duke of Wellington. Arliss claims Darryl F. Zanuck advised against this, as C. Aubrey Smith had just played the Duke alongside Arliss in The House of Rothschild.

Arliss wrote he fell into the "trap" of playing Wellington because he "knew too much about the man to start with. If my knowledge had been more superficial I should have seen him with the public eye. But when you dig deeply into the life and records of Wellington, you become rather fascinated with his character."

Emlyn Williams, who had a role in the film, later wrote "No one at Gaumont-British could discover who had suggested that he should be invited to impersonate an immensely tall, handsome soldier lover whose advances in the alcove were known to be as intrepid and as penetrating as in the field. Everybody protested, 'It wasn’t my idea!' Mr Arliss had the makings of the Wellington nose but it would seem that from there down the resemblance dwindled."

Arliss said it took three to four months for the script to be written and it was "the first picture I had made without the spontaneous constructive suggestions of Darryl Zanuck and the sound criticism of Maude Howell. I missed them both."

=== Shooting ===
According to Williams, there were two weeks of rehearsal prior to filming where Arliss would lecture on the film. Filming started 20 August 1934 at Shepherd's Bush. There were two units, the main one under Victor filming interior scenes at Shepherd's Bush, the other under William Dodds making 'exteriors' at Welwyn Garden City.

Arliss later said "I think that the film will show he [Wellington] was something more than n great soldier... He obviously had a very charming side to his character that was not always apparent on the surface. He had a good deal of malice and wit in him and a sense of ordinary fun.... I think the film will bring out, too, the extraordinary resemblance between the state of Europe during the years after the fall of Napoleon and the unsettled conditions of today."

It was one of the most expensive British movies made til that point and was one of a series of costume/historical pictures at the time.

Balcon recalled Arliss "had that exaggerated self-importance which is just pomposity (he would now be called ‘big-headed’) and he certainly tried to convey the idea that he was conferring a great favour on us to be working at all."

== Release ==
The film premiered at the Tivolie on 30 November 1934, attended by the Prince of Wales.

The film struggled to find a release in the US that Gaumont was satisfied with being turned down by Loew's. However it was given an American release.

The movie was re-released in 1942.

== Reception ==
=== Box office ===
The film was the ninth most popular at the British box office in 1935–36.

However Balcon wrote "by the time he came to us the Arliss novelty was beginning to wear off and I am afraid the films we made with him... were not very distinguished works." Williams claimed the movie "turned out to be Arliss' first failure."

=== Critical ===
The British critic for Variety said it was "a satisfactory commercial proposition throughout the world." However the American critic for the same magazine called it only "intermittently entertaining" and "not outstanding.

The New York Times reviewer wrote, "The Iron Duke can be recommended to Mr. Arliss's admirers everywhere as a pseudo-historical drama which manages to be both impressive and amusing and which reveals the star at his very best". The Maclean's magazine critic complained that "The picture went on quite a long time after Waterloo, however, without a great deal of story to go on" and that "George Arliss, however, with his familiar blend of elderly gentlemanly oddity and amiability, didn't seem very fortunately cast as a warrior, especially a warrior on the grand scale of the Duke of Wellington."

Arliss wrote "I suppose no actor is a very good judge of his own pictures but it seems to me that Victor Saville made a good job of The Iron Duke."

More recently, TV Guide gave the film two out of four stars, and wrote, "Not only are the pace and direction of The Iron Duke uninspired and haphazard, but the script is rife with historical inaccuracies, the glossing over of less flattering events, and definite misrepresentation in the case of Marshal Ney's (Willard) execution". Britmovie called the film a "colourful yet flat historical drama", though it praised George Arliss, "who was skilled at playing historical characters and delivers a typically perceptive performance."

Jeffrey Richards called it "a lacklustre effort, falling below the lively standard of his [Arliss's] American vehicles. Arliss was in any case curious casting for the role of the Duke of Wellington. A slight, round-shouldered figure with equine features and flared nostrils, he lacked the physical authority of almost all the other actors to have played the part... Arliss contented himself with interpreting Wellington as a wise, sly, witty old gentleman in exactly the same mould as his Disraeli and Voltaire."

== Legacy ==
After making the movie, Arliss returned to Hollywood to make Cardinal Richelieu, then went back to Britain to make two more films for Gaumont, The Guv'nor and East Meets West.
