= Timeline of Lord Byron =

This is a chronology of events in the life of George Gordon Byron, 6th Baron Byron (22 January 1788 – 19 April 1824). Each year links to its corresponding "year in poetry" article:

1788

22 January – Born, 16 Holles Street, London.

1789

Mother (Catherine Gordon) took lodgings in Queen Street, Aberdeen.

1791

2 August – Father (John "Mad Jack" Byron) died in France never having seen his son.
Mother moved to flat in 64 Broad Street, Aberdeen.

1794–1798 – At Aberdeen Grammar School.

1798

21 May – George Gordon Byron became 6th Baron Byron of Rochdale on death of great-uncle.
August – With his mother took up residence at ancestral home, Newstead Abbey, near Nottingham.

1799

Lived with Parkyns family, Nottingham. Tutored by "Dummer" Rogers.
July – Removed to London by John Hanson, Byron’s lawyer & business agent.
September – Attended Dr. Glennie's School, Dulwich Grove.
Spent Christmas holidays with Hanson family at Earl's Court, London.
Spent summer holiday in Newstead Abbey and fell in love with 1st cousin, Margaret Parker.

1801

April – Entered Harrow School.
Spent summer with mother at Mrs Massingberd's, 16 Piccadilly, at Hanson's and in Cheltenham.
Christmas holidays in Bath with mother.

1803

February – Newstead Abbey leased to Henry Edward Yelverton, 19th Baron Grey de Ruthyn.
21 July – Mother rented Burgage Manor, Southwell.
September – Fell madly in love with neighbour's daughter, Mary Chaworth, of Annesley Hall. Refused to go back to Harrow.

1804

January – Fell out with Lord Grey and returned to Harrow.
22 March – Started holiday at Burgage Manor and met the Pigots who lived opposite.

1805

2 August – Played for Harrow in annual cricket match v Eton at Lord's. Scored 6 notches.
24 October – Went up to Trinity College, Cambridge University.
Friendships with E.N.Long & John Edleston began.

1806

February – Got heavily in debt with moneylenders; dissipation in London.
April – Returned to Trinity College.
July – At Burgage Manor writing poems.
August – After acrimonious quarrel with mother escaped to London.
November – Collection of poems, Fugitive Pieces, privately printed.

1807

January Second volume of poetry, Poems on Various Occasions, privately printed.
June – Hours of Idleness published. Back at Cambridge started friendships with John Cam Hobhouse and Scrope Davies, Matthews and Hodgson.
December – Came down from Cambridge University for good.

1808

February – Hours of Idleness ridiculed in the Edinburgh Review.
March – Poems Original and Translated published.
July–August – At Brighton with John Hobhouse and Scrope Davies.

1809

13 March – Took seat in the House of Lords.
English Bards and Scotch Reviewers published.
20 June – Travelled to Falmouth with Hobhouse.
2 July – Set sail with Hobhouse in the Lisbon packet, Princess Elizabeth.
7 July – Arrived in Lisbon.
12–16 July – Explored Sintra.
20 July – Departed for Spain.
29 July – Arrived Cádiz.
3 August – Sailed in the frigate, Hyperion.
4 August – Arrived at the Rock of Gibraltar.
16 August – Sailed for Malta in packet Townshend.
31 August – Arrived Malta.
September – Had romantic affair with Mrs Spencer Smith.
19 September – Left Malta aboard the brig, Spider, for Greece & Albania.
26 September – Aboard the Spider, at anchor off Patras, and spent several hours on shore.
26–28 September – Aboard the Spider, passed by Missolonghi, Ithaca, Cephalonia, and Santa Maura.
28 September – 19:00. Anchored off Preveza.
29 September – Landed at Preveza.
30 September – Visited the ruins of Nicopolis.
1 October – Left on a large boat for Salaora, the port of Arta, en route for Ioannina.
1–2 October – Stayed for two nights in customs house at Salaora.
3 October – Left by horse and arrived in Arta.
11 October – Left for Tepelenë, Albania, to meet Ali Pasha.
12 October – First encounter with Ali Pasha of Tepelenë.
26 October – Returned to Ioannina.
31 October – At Ioannina. Started poem, Childe Harold’s Pilgrimage.
3 November – Slept the night at St. Dimitrios Chan, south of Ioannina.
4 November – Arrived at Arta.
5 November – Arrived at Salaora.
6 November – Arrived at Preveza.
7 November – Left Preveza at noon aboard a turkish galleote for Santa Maura.
8 November – Due to bad weather they finished up at Porto Fanari.
9 November – Decided to return by horse to Preveza.
10 November – Visited the ruins of Nicopolis again.
13 November – Sailed from Preveza to Vonitsa.
14 November – Travelled towards Missolonghi.
20 November – Visited Missolonghi.
25 December – Arrived at Athens.

1810

Mar–Apr – Toured Turkey, visited Smyrna, Ephesus, Troy.
5 March – Arrived Smyrna aboard the brig Pylades.
3 May – Swam Hellespont from Sestos to Abydos.
13 May – Arrived Constantinople.
18 July – Arrived Athens.
21 July – Left for the Morea.
26 July – Arrived Patras.
19 August(?) – At Athens: stayed in Capuchin monastery.
18 October – Returned Athens.

1811

March – Wrote Hints from Horace & The Curse of Minerva
22 April – Sailed in the Hydra
30 April–2 June – At Malta. Sailed for England in frigate Volage
14 July – Landed Sheerness; at Reddish’s Hotel, St James' Street.
1 August – Mother died.
3 August – At Newstead Abbey; Matthews drowned at Cambridge.
16 October – Visited Cambridge University with Scrope Berdmore Davies.
28 October – Took up residence at 8 St James Street's, London.
4 November – Dinner with Samuel Rogers to meet the poet Thomas Moore.
19 December – After further visit to Cambridge left for Newstead, where Byron had an affair with Welsh maid, Susan Vaughan.

1812

27 February – Maiden speech in House of Lords – opposing the Framework Bill 1812
10 March – Childe Harold’s Pilgrimage Cantos I & II published, which made Byron famous overnight.
25 March – First saw Annabella Milbanke.
April – Affair with Lady Caroline Lamb started.
21 April – Second speech in the House of Lords – in favor of Catholic emancipation.
15 August – Thomas Claughton offered £140,000 for Newstead but delayed payment.
September – Wrote Drury Lane Theatre Address at request of Lord Holland.
October – Proposal of marriage to Annabella Milbanke rejected; Wrote The Waltz.
24 October – Left for Eywood, Presteign, to visit the Oxfords.
21 November – Left Eywood to stay with Jerseys at Middleton.
30 November – At Batt's Hotel, Dover Street, London.
14 December(?) – Back at Eywood.

1813

19 January – Took lodgings at 4 Bennet Street, St James'.
29 May – Accompanied Moore to visit Leigh Hunt in prison.
1 June – Last speech in House of Lords.
8 June – First edition of The Giaour published.
20 June – Met Madame de Stael for first time.
26 June – Augusta Leigh arrives in London, and is met by her half-brother, Byron.
1 July – Third (and final) speech in the House of Lords – Debate on Major Cartwright’s Petition
August – Correspondence with Miss Milbanke begun.
September – Visit to James Wedderburn Webster and dallied with Lady Frances Webster.
19 October – "Spared" Lady Frances and returned to London.
14 November – Began Journal (continued to 19 April 1814).
2 December – Bride of Abydos published.

1814

1 February – Corsair published. 10,000 copies sold on day of publication.
March – Sat to Phillips for portrait.
28 March – Rented apartment in Albany, Piccadilly.
2 April – With Augusta at her home at Six Mile Bottom, Cambs .
16 April – Ode to Napoleon Buonaparte published anonymously.
1 July – At Duke of Wellington's Ball.
22 July – At Hastings with Augusta.
6 August – Lara published with Samuel Rogers' Jacqueline.
9 September – Tentative proposal to Annabella Milbanke.
15 September – Received Annabelle's acceptance of proposal of marriage.
29 October – Left for Seaham, near Durham, Annabella’s home.
30–31 October – At Six-Mile-Bottom with Augusta.
2 November – Arrived Seaham.
16 November – Left for London.
18 November – At Cambridge.
19–22 November – At Six Mile Bottom.
23 November – Applauded by undergraduates at Cambridge University.
24 November – London.
24 December – Left with Hobhouse for Seaham.
25 December – Christmas at Six Mile Bottom.
30 December – Arrived Seaham.

1815

2 January – Married to Miss Annabella Milbanke at Seaham.
2–21 January – Treaclemoon at Halnaby, Yorkshire.
21 January – 9 March – At Seaham.
12–28 March – At Six Mile Bottom.
29 March – Settled at 13 Piccadilly Terrace, London.
7 April – Met Sir Walter Scott at John Murray, Albemarle Street.
17 April – Death of Lord Wentworth; Milbankes took name of Noel.
April – Hebrew Melodies published with musical score by Nathan.
May – Became member of Management Sub-Committee, Drury Lane Theatre.
June–July – Visited Leigh Hunt at Maida Vale, London.
29 July – Signed new will leaving estate residue to Augusta Leigh.
October – Wrote Siege of Corinth.
November – Wrote Parisina.
10 December – Birth of Ada Lovelace, poet’s only legitimate daughter.

1824

19 April – Died of Malaria in Missolonghi, Greece.
