= Aston Hall, Yorkshire =

Former manor house in South Yorkshire, England

Coordinates: 53°21′40″N 1°17′49″W

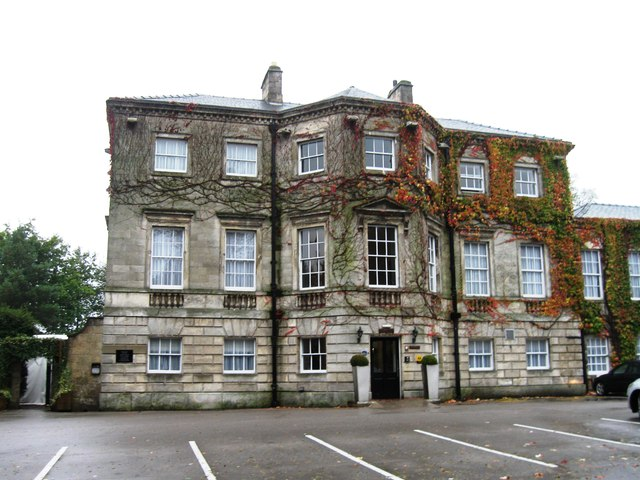
Aston Hall

Aston Hall is a former English country house in the village of Aston, South Yorkshire. It is now a hotel, and a Grade II* listed building.

== History ==
Aston Hall was a large country house, in the civil parish of Aston cum Aughton.

=== The manor house ===
The original manor house was home to the Darcys, descendants of George Darcy, 1st Baron of Aston. He married Dorothy Melton, whose ancestors were the earlier lords of the manor.

Following a fire, Robert Darcy, 4th Earl of Holderness had the remains of the old Darcy house pulled down. It was rebuilt in 1771–72 by York architect John Carr. Holderness let it to Harry Verelst, and sold it to him in 1774–75. A marble staircase was added in 1776–77 by John Platt, for Verelst.

=== The Verelsts ===
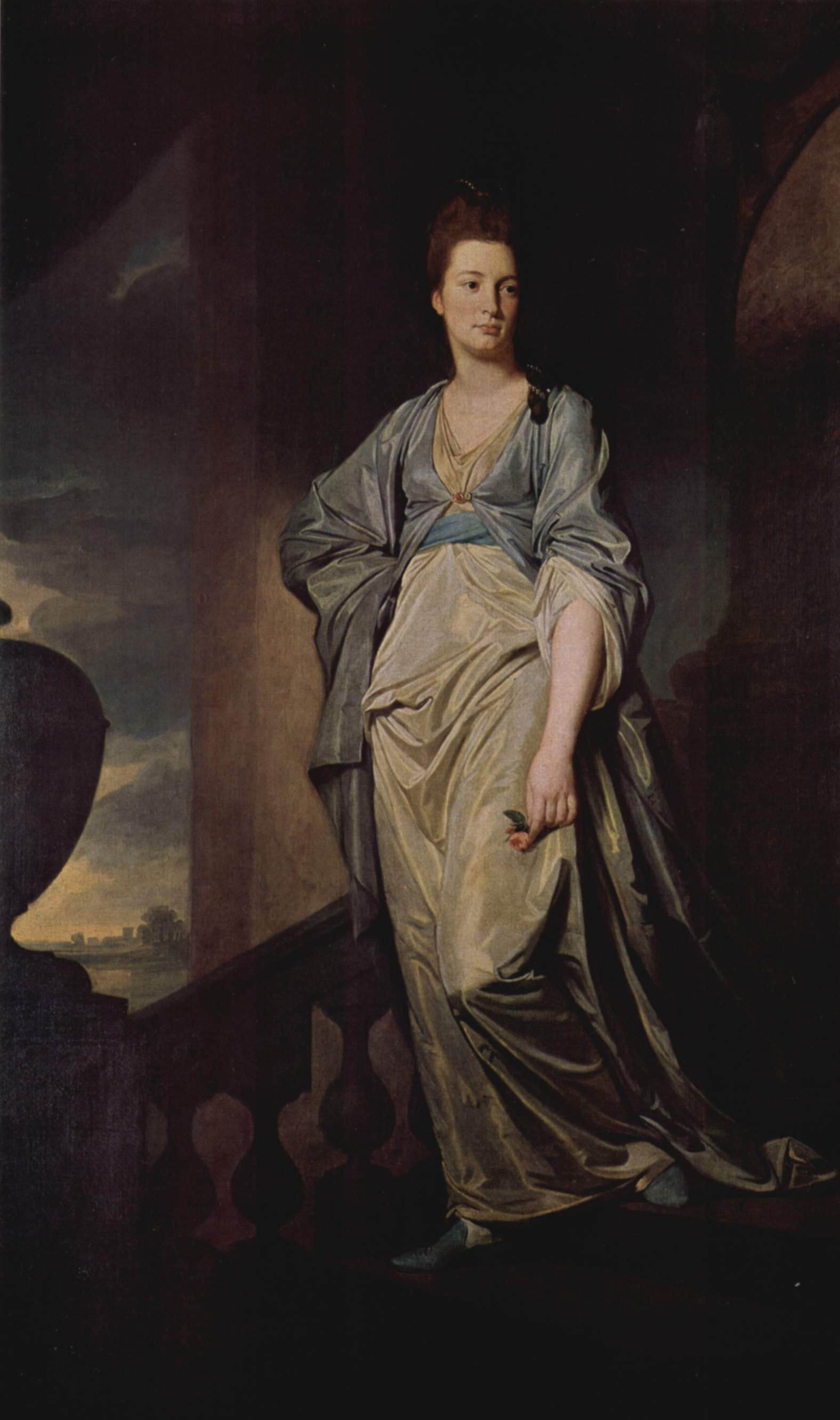
Ann Verelst, wife of Harry Verelst, 1773 portrait by George Romney

The Verelst family owned the Hall and most of the original Aston estate for around 150 years. The house and grounds were eventually broken up at a sale in the 1920s.

Harry Verelst had been Governor of Bengal from 1767 to 1769, and returned to England in 1770, marrying in 1771 Ann Wordsworth, with whom he had ten children. He spent heavily on acquiring from Holderness the Aston estate, as well as the house, causing him later financial problems when his assets in Bengal could not be repatriated. He died in 1785 in Boulogne, evading creditors. William Verelst (1784–1851), born at Aston Hall and the youngest of four sons, an academic and cleric, was last in the Verelst direct male line.

James Webster-Wedderburn rented the house. It is described as having a library and billiard room, many bedrooms, and ample stables. It was the setting of a celebrated house party in 1813, with its flirtation between his wife, Frances Webster, and Lord Byron. A wing for domestic service was added in 1825.

The Hall passed to Charles Reed, who changed his surname to Verelst. Reed was the illegitimate son of Arthur Charles Verelst (1779–1843), a cleric and the third son of Harry Verelst, who inherited Aston Hall in 1837.

Reed's eldest son, Harry Verelst, an amateur first class cricketer, died at the hall in April 1918. His eldest son, Harry Wilson Verelst, had been killed aged 26 at the Battle of the Somme in 1916 and the estate was inherited by Harry Verelst's only surviving son, Rodney Wilson Verelst, before being broken up and sold in 1928.

== Recent times ==
At one period, the house was known as Aughton Court, referring to the building with later additions on the site, around 1872. It then served as Aughton Hospital. It was bought by West Riding County Council in 1948 to be used as a hospital for female patients with intellectual disability, called Aston Hall Institution and then Aughton Court Hospital. The hospital building programme in 1966 called it an "inadequate unit", and foresaw expansion at nearby Middlewood Hospital. In 1968 it was undergoing conversion into a nursing home. The hospital was closed in 1984. It is now a hotel.

== See also ==
- Grade II* listed buildings in South Yorkshire
- Listed buildings in Aston cum Aughton
