= Church of All Saints, Aston cum Aughton =

Church in Aston, South Yorkshire

All Saints' Church
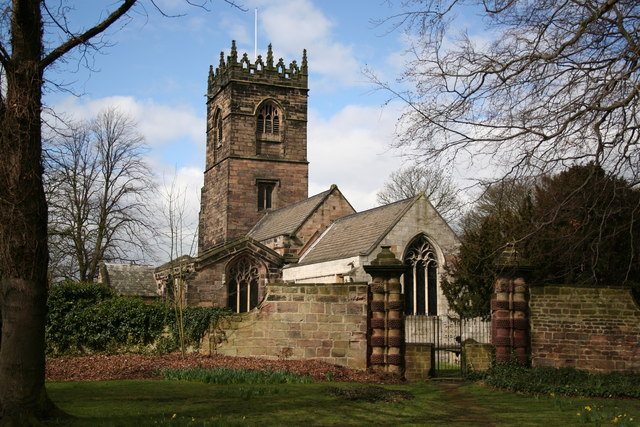
- All Saints' Church
- 53.3620°N 1.2981°W
- OS grid reference: SK 46816 85251
- Location: Aston cum Aughton
- Country: England
- Denomination: Church of England

Administration
- Province: York
- Diocese: Sheffield
- Deanery: Rotherham Deanery
- Parish: Aston cum Aughton

Clergy
- Vicar: Reverend Vicky Camber

The Church of All Saints is a 12th-century parish church of Aston cum Aughton, located in the village of Aston in South Yorkshire, England. It is a Church of England church in the Diocese of Sheffield. The building was remodelled in the late 14th and 15th centuries, and the chancel was rebuilt in the 19th century. The building is a Grade I listed building.

== Description ==
The church, located in the village of Aston in South Yorkshire, was built in red sandstone and limestone ashlar, and has lead and Welsh slate roofs. The church contains elements of English Gothic and Perpendicular Gothic styles. The building layout consists of a nave, north and south aisles, a south porch, a chancel with a south chapel, and a west tower. The porch dates from 1330 AD. Flanking the doorway are weathered stone carvings believed to be the images of King Edward III and his wife, Queen Philippa. The font dates to around 1400 AD. The base of the font is engraved with a figure holding a knife, who is believed to be King Herod. The interior contains the tomb and effigies of Sir John Darcy and his three wives. Recessed into the floor is the large tomb of the Melton family.

There are several wall plaques: in the south aisle are memorials plaques dedicated to Thomas Gray (1771) and William Mason (1797). There is a plaque on the south wall of Sir Francis Fane (1680) and his wife Elizabeth, (1669), several other plaques dedidated to rectors in the 19th century. Two passages of scripture were uncovered during renovation. A marble bas relief on the north wall of the Virgin and Child was carved by Giovanni Bastianini around 1855.

== History ==
There was a church on this site at the time of the Domesday survey in 1086, but the current building was originally constructed in the late 12th century. The building was extensively remodelled in the late 14th and 15th centuries, and the chancel was rebuilt in the 19th century. A medieval stained glass window belonging to the Darcy family of Aston Hall, was recovered and installed in the church after a fire destroyed Aston Hall in 1767. The east window was designed by stained-glass window firm, Heaton, Butler and Bayne. The chancel was renovated in 1863, by Matthew Ellison Hadfield.

== See also ==
- Grade I listed buildings in South Yorkshire
- Listed buildings in Aston cum Aughton
