= Lady Frances Webster =

Anglo-Irish noblewoman

Lady Frances Wedderburn-Webster
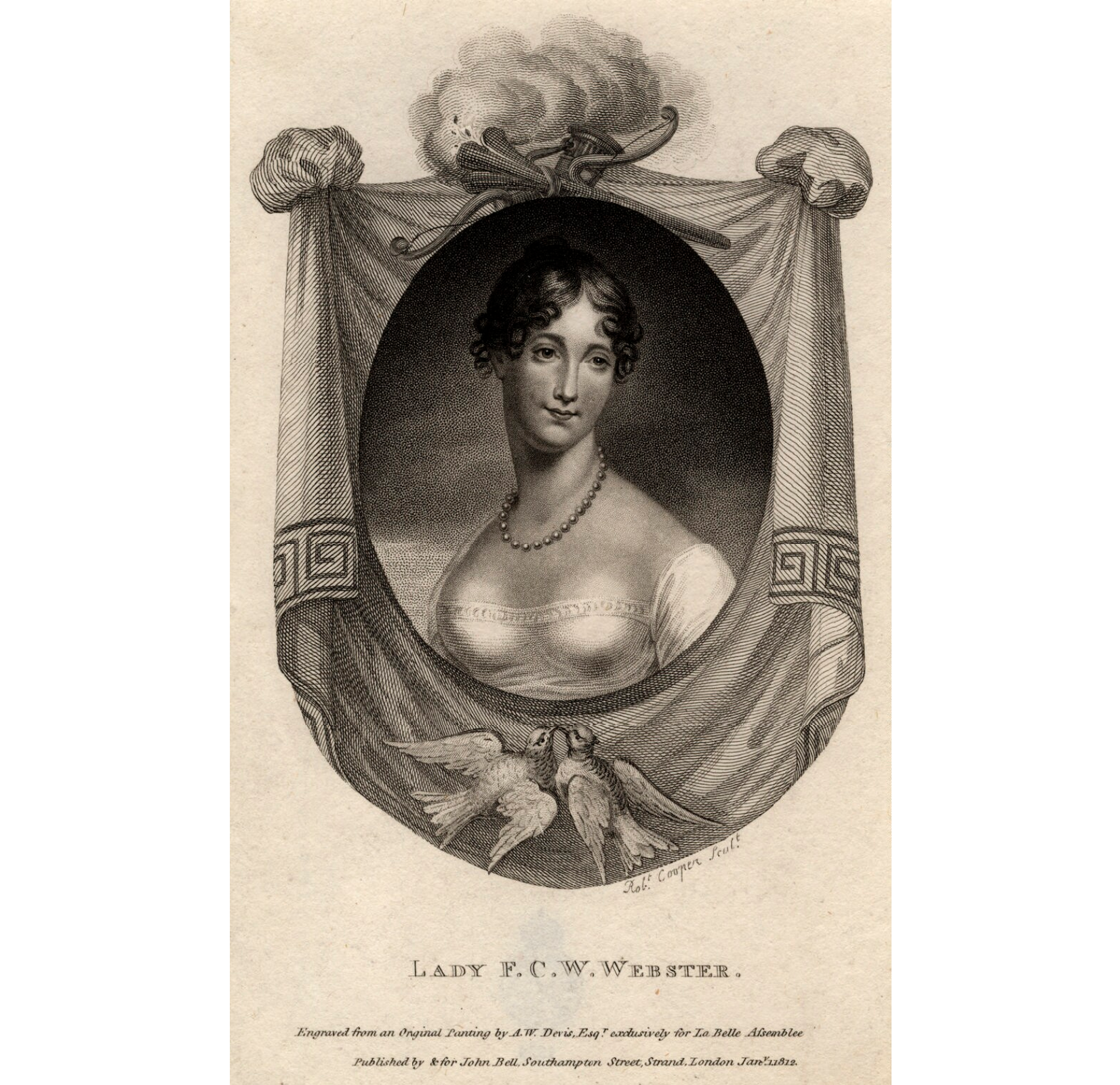
- Lady Frances Wedderburn-Webster, 1812 engraving
- Born: Frances Caroline Annesley; 1793
- Died: 1837 (aged 43–44)
- Spouse: James Wedderburn-Webster (m. 1810)
- Parent(s): Arthur Annesley, 1st Earl of Mountnorris; Sarah Cavendish

Lady Frances Caroline Wedderburn-Webster (née Annesley; 1793–1837) was an Anglo-Irish woman who became a figure of scandal of the Regency period, for her supposed affairs with the leading celebrities, Lord Byron and the Duke of Wellington. It may be that neither of those relationships went beyond flirtation.

== Background ==
She was the daughter of Arthur Annesley, 1st Earl of Mountnorris, and Sarah, daughter of Sir Henry Cavendish, 2nd Baronet.

== Relationship with Byron ==
Frances married James Webster (see below), a crony of Byron, and he introduced Byron to his young wife in 1811. Byron, based on information from Webster's brother, considered that the Websters had a marriage of convenience. He coined the nickname "Phryne" for Frances.

Invited to Aston Hall, Yorkshire, by the Websters in September 1813, Byron associated the house, but mistakenly, with the place to which his father John Byron took his lover Lady Carmarthen. That had been the rectory at nearby Aston, South Yorkshire, which William Mason as incumbent had leased to them. He wished his half-sister Augusta Leigh to come too, but she refused, despite the family connection that Aston Hall had been the property of Robert Darcy, 4th Earl of Holderness, her grandfather. Byron then planned to seduce Frances. In a position to do so, he did not, on his own account.

=== House party at Aston Hall ===
There were other reasons for Byron to accept the invitation to a house party at Aston Hall. It was quite near Newstead Abbey, his family home, which he was trying to sell to Thomas Claughton in a deal that started stalling in spring 1813. He was settling his servant Robert Rushton in the service of the Websters, which he joined 7 September. The day before, Byron wrote to Webster about untenanted properties within ten miles of Aston Hall. He accepted the invitation on 15 September.

This time at Aston Hall set the terms for the future relationship between Frances and Byron. One of the party was Lady Catherine Annesley, younger sister to Frances, at this time disappointed in her relationship with Viscount Bury (Augustus Keppel). James Webster had recently visited Newstead Abbey, and wished to return: Byron had reason to believe he was carrying on with one of the servant girls there. Byron broke his visit after not much more than a week, but returned from London early in October. He found two more guests, William Westcombe and George Charles Agar, and Frances hankering after Viscount Petersham.

In a letter to Lady Melbourne, Byron described how he was reluctant to make advances to Frances, who was not reciprocating enough for his taste; but he had tried a speech on Frances in the billiard room, and was being provoked by James Webster's boastful talk. Byron and James did, however, visit Newstead Abbey together, one or two days later. Byron and Frances exchanged notes and tokens, and there apparently the affair rested.

Byron had learned that there was an affair of the heart between Frances and John Campbell, James's lawyer. The widowed Lady Sitwell arrived, Byron was required by Lady Catherine to give up his seat next to her, James calling Byron "ungallant" for his reluctance. Byron agreed to loan James £1000. On 18 October, the day before Byron left, Frances wrote a letter in reply to a cutting note, declaring she was Byron's but would not be "guilty", and asking for a miniature portrait. The next day James and Byron travelled to London together, on the loan business.

=== Literary aftermath ===
After the resolution of the affair with Frances Webster as "Platonic love", Byron in November wrote The Bride of Abydos. In December 1813 the affair descended from the emotional heights. Jerome McGann, interpreting Byron's opaque hints, puts the inspiration for the poem down to Byron's recent affairs of 1813, with Augusta and Frances. I Saw Thee Weep, from Byron's Hebrew Melodies, is also associated with Frances.

Later, on hearing of the supposed affair between the Duke of Wellington and Frances, Byron wrote the poem When We Two Parted. There is some uncertainty about when he wrote it, in the period 1815–16, and there is more than one version of the poem; but it was intended for Frances.

== Relationship with the Duke of Wellington ==
The Duke of Wellington wrote a letter to Frances Webster in the early hours of 18 June 1815, the day of the battle of Waterloo. Frances and James Webster subsequently brought a libel action over allegations that she was having affair with the Duke. At the time of the letter, she was pregnant, thought to be in the third trimester.

The St James Chronicle claimed that James Webster had demanded a large sum from the Duke, and that the Websters were divorcing. The case came to court on 16 February 1816, with John Campbell as counsel for the Websters. The editor of the St James Chronicle, Charles Baldwin, offered no defence, and the Websters were awarded £2,000.

== Later life ==
Frances Webster did then take as her lover the Regency dandy Scrope Berdmore Davies.

Frances and Byron kept in touch, Frances sending "long, overwrought letters". In 1823, when the Websters' marriage had broken down, and Byron was trying to raise some cash from the loan to James Webster from ten years before, she wrote to him at Genoa from Paris, as a friend.

== Family ==
On 10 October 1810 Frances married James Wedderburn-Webster, known as "Bold" Webster. They had five children:

- Lucy Sarah Anne (1812–1864)
- Charles Byron (born 1815–1817). Born in Paris on 28 August 1815 he died at Nantes in October 1817. He was buried in Caen Cathedral, where there is a monument to him. (Note: Frances was heavily pregnant with a child, who was christened Charles Byron, when she attended the Duchess of Richmond's ball and sat next to the Duke of Wellington.)
- Charles Francis (1820–1886)
- Augustus George (1821–1845)
- George Gordon Trophime-Gérard de Lally-Tollendal (1827–1875) (see Marquis de Lally-Tollendal)

The Websters spent their later years in penury, due to the husband's extravagance. When Frances died in 1837 her husband was reportedly in a debtors' prison. He died in 1840.
