= William Doughty =

William Doughty may refer to:

- William Doughty (naval architect) (1773–1859), American designer of clippers
- William Doughty (painter) (1755–1782), British painter
- William H. Doughty, founder or co-founder of Meadeau View Institute, the Institute for Constitutional Education, and George Wythe College
