= Thomas Beckwith =

English painter

Thomas Beckwith FSA (10 February 1731 – 17 February 1786) was an English painter, genealogist and antiquary.

== Life and work ==
Beckwith was born at Rothwell, West Yorkshire, the son of a West Riding solicitor, and brother of Josiah Beckwith (b. 1734), attorney and antiquary. He was apprenticed as a house-painter to George Fleming of Wakefield, who tutored him in drawing and limning; subsequently Beckwith set himself up in business as a painter in York. He painted portraits and also made many drawings of antiques, local churches, ruins etc., some of which were finished in watercolour.

Beckwith acquired a great knowledge of heraldry and local family pedigrees which he amassed in 30–40 volumes of notes, seeming "to have spent much of his time in forming antiquarian and genealogical collections, of which he left a great mass behind him... they were so numerous that they have found their way into almost every collection of manuscripts which has been formed during the last half century." He was elected Fellow of the Society of Antiquaries of London, and also wrote a book on local history, "A Walk in and about the city of York", though it was not published.

In 1781 he took out a patent for "crayons for drawing and other purposes of various colours, superior to any hereforeto made." The new type of crayon, which could be sharpened like a pencil, was licensed to be manufactured and sold by the London artists' supplier George Riley.

Beckwith's wife, Frances, died on 29 August 1773, aged 36. Beckwith himself died in York on 17 February 1786. His son, Ray Beckwith (d. 19 Dec 1799), was a medical doctor who practised in York.

Thomas Beckwith's portrait was etched by William Doughty.
