= Anna Harriett Drury =

English novelist and poet (1824–1912)

Anna Harriett Drury (also Harriet, 1824–1912) was an English novelist who wrote "conventional romances, with a few sharp observations on the role of unattached women in their relatives' houses". She also published poetry and other novels, some marked as intended "for boys".

== Life ==
Anna Drury's birth is recorded in the 1901 census return as in 1824 in Harrow, Middlesex. Her father, Rev. William James Joseph Drury, and her grandfather, Rev. Mark Drury, had both taught at Harrow School, but they left sizeable debts when they withdrew in 1826. Through this Harrow connection, Drury became friends with Anthony Trollope, who later helped her in her literary work.

Drury's father then became chaplain to King Leopold I of Belgium. While in Brussels, Anna Drury first met Frances Trollope, with whose family the Drurys were friendly. By then Anna Drury knew Greek and some Hebrew. She had begun creative writing as a child.

After a period in London, Anna Drury moved to Torquay in 1866, where she became a close friend of Frances Mary Peard. The 1901 census return gives as her occupation "living by her own means (author)". She and two probable sisters of hers, Jane Emily and Sarah Frances, were boarders in a house that may have belonged to Thomas and Jane Tothill, who are also listed as resident there.

Anna Harriett Drury never married. She died in Newton Abbot in June 1912.

== Writings ==
Drury's "conventional romances" and other works included Annesley, and other poems (1847), Friends and Fortune, a moral tale (1849), Light and Shade: or, the Young Artist. A tale (1853), Misrepresentation (1859), The Story of a Shower (1872), Gabriel's Appointment (1877), Called to the Rescue (1879) and In the Enemy's Country; or, the Raven of Steinbrück. A story of 1813, etc. (1891) Some are marked as "for boys".

Numerous books of Drury's are available in facsimile reprints, secondhand original editions, and as free downloads.

In The Normans: or, Kith and Kin (1870), the heroine pointedly asks her father, "What becomes of clergymen's daughters when their fathers die, and their homes are broken up?"

== Partial list of works ==
- The First of May by Anna Harriet
  Friends and Fortune: A Moral Tale, 1 vol., London: William Pickering, 1849
- Eastbury: A Tale, 1 vol., London: William Pickering, 1851
- The First of May: A New Version of a Celebrated Modern Ballad, London: William Pickering, 1851
- Light and Shade: or, The Young Artist, A Tale. 1 vol., London: William Pickering, 1853
- The Blue Ribbons: A Story of the Last Century, 1 vol., London: Kerby and Son, 1855
- Misrepresentation: A Novel, 2 vols, London: John W. Parker, 1859
- Deep Waters: A Novel, 3 vols, London: Chapman and Hall, 1863
- The Brothers: A Novel, 2 vols, London: Chapman and Hall, 1865
- The Three Half-Crowns: A Story for Boys, 1 vol., London: SPCK, 1866
- Richard Rowe's Parcel: A Story for Boys, 1 vol., London: SPCK, 1868
- The Normans: or, Kith and Kin, 2 vols, London: Chapman and Hall, 1870
- The Story of a Shower: A Novel, 2 vols, London: Bentley, 1872
- Ellen North's Crumbs, 1 vol., London: SPCK, 1873
- Furnished Apartments, 3 vols, London: Bentley, 1875
- Gabriel's Appointment: A Novel, 3 vols, London: Bentley, 1877
- Called to the Rescue, 3 vols, London: Bentley, 1879
- In the Enemy's Country: or, The Raven of Steinbrück. A Story of 1813, 1 vol., London: Griffith and Farran, 1891
