= Swallownest =

Village in South Yorkshire, England

Coordinates: 53.3623°N 1.3251°W

- Village
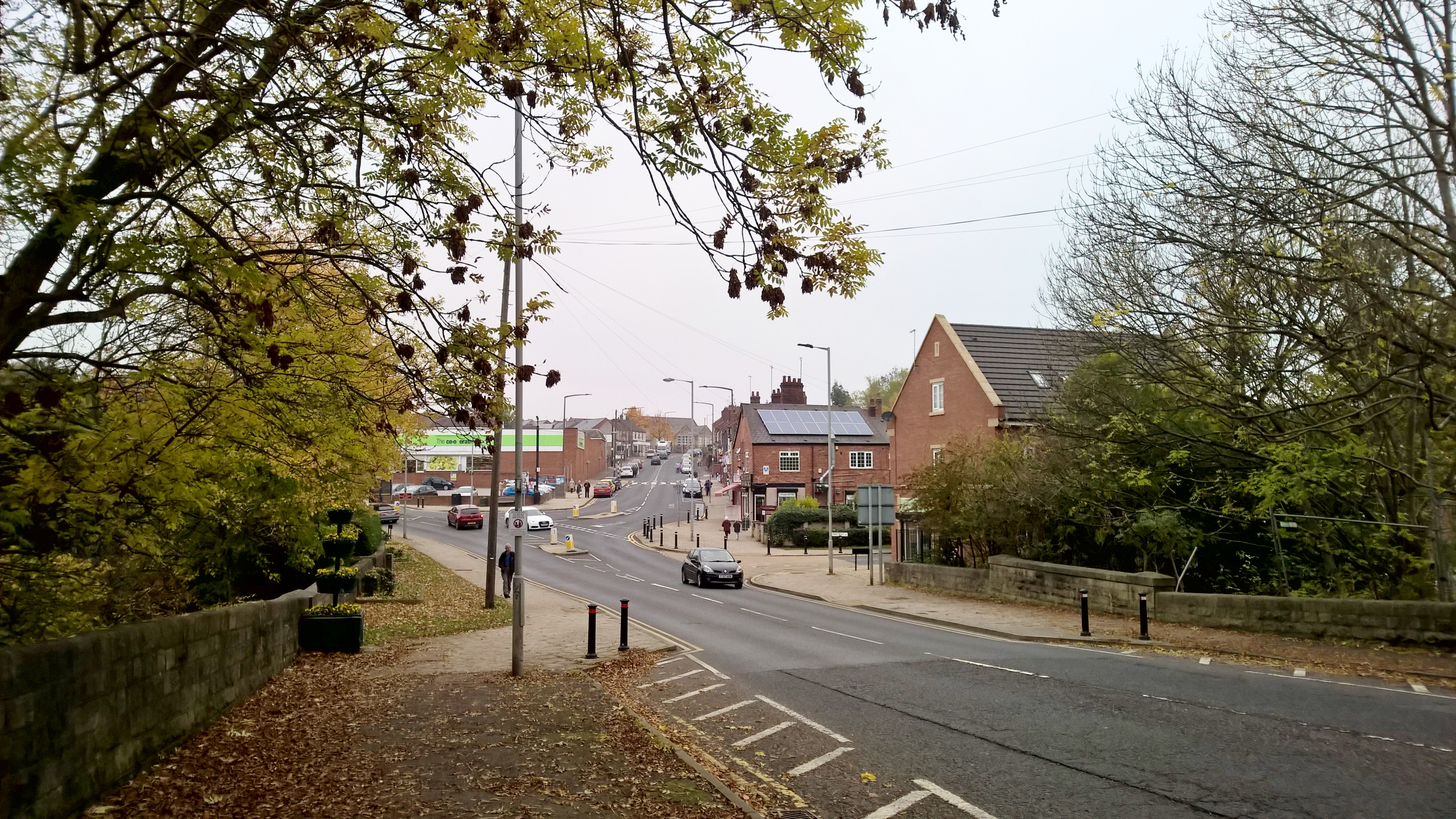
- Mansfield Road

- Location within South Yorkshire
- Population: 15,022
- OS grid reference: SK449852
- Civil parish: Aston cum Aughton
- Metropolitan borough: Rotherham
- Metropolitan county: South Yorkshire
- Region: Yorkshire and the Humber
- Country: England
- Sovereign state: United Kingdom
- Post town: SHEFFIELD
- Postcode district: S26
- Dialling code: 0114
- Police: South Yorkshire
- Fire: South Yorkshire
- Ambulance: Yorkshire
- UK Parliament: Rother Valley

Swallownest is a village located in the civil parish of Aston cum Aughton within the Metropolitan Borough of Rotherham, South Yorkshire, England. The village lies 4 mi (6.4 km) south of Rotherham and 7 mi (11 km) from Sheffield.

Swallownest borders the Sheffield suburb of Woodhouse to the west, Beighton to the southwest, the small village of Aston to the east, and Aughton to the north. The village is also served by Woodhouse railway station.

According to White's directory of 1833, Swallow Nest was the name of the Toll bar and public house, the home of J. Ward, a victualler and H. Ward, a wheelwright.

== See also ==
- Swallownest railway station
- Swallownest Miners Welfare F.C.
- Listed buildings in Aston cum Aughton
