= Listed buildings in Aston cum Aughton =

Aston cum Aughton is a civil parish in the Metropolitan Borough of Rotherham, South Yorkshire, England. The parish contains 25 listed buildings that are recorded in the National Heritage List for England. Of these, one is listed at Grade I, the highest of the three grades, one is at Grade II*, the middle grade, and the others are at Grade II, the lowest grade. The parish contains the villages of Aston, Aughton and Swallownest and the surrounding countryside. Most of the listed buildings are houses and associated structures, farmhouses and farm buildings. The other listed buildings include a church, associated gate piers and a gravestone, a former school used as a reading room, and two mileposts.

== Key ==
Grade	Criteria
I	Buildings of exceptional interest, sometimes considered to be internationally important
II*	Particularly important buildings of more than special interest
II	Buildings of national importance and special interest

== Buildings ==
Name and location	Photograph	Date	Notes	Grade
All Saints Church; 53.36209°N 1.29798°W		Late 12th century	The church has been altered and extended through the centuries, the chancel was rebuilt before 1860, and in 1862–63 the church was restored by M. E. Hadfield. The church is built in red sandstone and limestone, and has roofs of lead and Welsh slate. It consists of a nave, north and south aisles, a south porch, a chancel with a south chapel, and a west tower. The tower has three stages, diagonal buttresses, a three-light west window with a pointed arch, a clock face under an ogee arch on the north side, and an embattled parapet with crocketed pinnacles.	I
The Grange; 53.36296°N 1.29844°W	—	Early 18th century	The house was extended in the 19th century, the original part is in sandstone with a roof of Westmorland slate, and the extension is in brick with a Welsh slate roof. The main part has two storeys and an attic, and three bays, there is an extension at the rear, and a two-storey four-bay wing on the right. In the main part are quoins, and a former doorway with an architrave, a pulvinated frieze, and a cornice. The windows are transomed casements with keystones, and there are two gabled dormers. In the right return is a two-storey bay window and a dormer, and the left return contains a porch and sash windows. The rear extension has mullioned windows, with some mullions removed, and the windows in the right wing are sashes.	II
Gravestone; 53.36196°N 1.29781°W	—	c. 1729	The gravestone in the churchyard of All Saints Church is to the memory of members of the Hill family. It is in sandstone and is in the form of a coffin, with a coped lid, handles carved in relief and each end, and inscriptions.	II
Gate piers, All Saints Church; 53.36202°N 1.29710°W		Early to mid 18th century	The gate piers are in sandstone, and each pier has four joined shafts, five bands of vermiculated rusticated, a cornice, and a ball finial.	II
Falconer Farmhouse; 53.37110°N 1.33717°W	—	Early to mid 18th century	A farmhouse and cottage in red brick, with a band, and a Welsh slate roof with a coped gable and shaped kneelers on the right. There are two storeys, five bays, and two short rear wings with hipped roofs. The central doorway has a chamfered quoined surround, and the windows are casements under segmental brick arches.	II
Dovecote, Vessey Close Farm; 53.37215°N 1.27801°W	—	Early to mid 18th century	The dovecote is in sandstone, and has a continuous ledge near the eaves, and a stone slate roof with shaped kneelers. It is square and consists of a single cell with two storeys, and contains a doorway and a two-light mullioned window. Inside there are nesting boxes in both storeys.	II
South Farm House; 53.36346°N 1.30033°W	—	Mid 18th century	The house is in sandstone on a plinth, and has a roof of Welsh slate and pantile with a coped gable and shaped kneelers on the right. There are two storeys and two bays. The windows are three-light casements with mullions.	II
Outbuilding west of South Farm House; 53.36361°N 1.30045°W	—	Mid 18th century	The outbuilding is in sandstone, and has a pantile roof with coped gables and shaped kneelers. There is a single storey and two bays. The building contains two doorways, and a casement window with its mullions removed.	II
Aston Hall; 53.36144°N 1.29654°W		1767–72	A country house designed by John Carr, with a service wing added in 1825, and later used as a hotel. It is in limestone on a plinth, with a rusticated ground floor, bands, a modillion cornice, and a hipped roof in Westmorland slate. There are three storeys, a front of seven bays, the middle three bays canted, and a two-storey five-bay service wing on the right. In the centre is a doorway, and all the windows are sashes. The window in the ground floor have rusticated flat arches, in the middle floor they are taller, with architraves, pulvinated friezes, cornices, and balustraded aprons, and those in the top floor with architraves.	II*
22 and 24 Worksop Road; 53.36319°N 1.29976°W	—	c. 1770	A pair of houses designed by John Carr in sandstone, on plinths, with bands, and hipped roofs in Welsh slate and tile. Each house has a block of two storeys and two bays, projecting to the rear, with a wing of one storey and three bays on the left. On the front are doorways and casement windows.	II
High Trees; 53.36230°N 1.29877°W	—	1770–71	A rectory designed by John Carr, incorporating an older rectory as the service wing, and later a private house. It is in stuccoed red brick with roofs of Westmorland and Welsh slate. There are two storeys, the main house has fronts of three and two bays, and the service wing, recessed on the left, has fronts of two bays. The main house has a plinth, a sill band, a modillion eaves cornice, and a hipped roof. In the centre is a porch that has pilasters with acanthus capitals, a frieze with panels and a keystone, and a modillion cornice and blocking course. The service wing has modillion eaves, and in both parts the windows are sashes.	II
Aughton Hall; 53.37515°N 1.31818°W	—	Late 18th century	A house that was extended in the 19th century, it is in red sandstone, its projections stuccoed, on a plinth, with a sill band, a moulded eaves cornice, and a coated stone slate roof. There are two storeys, three bays, and a rear wing on the right. In the centre is a porch with a pediment, and a doorway with a fanlight, flanked by casement windows, and the upper floor contains a Venetian window. The outer bays have semicircular projections containing casement windows.	II
Fence Farmhouse; 53.36432°N 1.33798°W	—	Late 18th century	The farmhouse, which was later extended, is in sandstone on a plinth, with a floor band, shaped stone gutters, and a hipped Welsh slate roof. There are two storeys and four bays, with a round-arched panel in each bay. Steps lead up to a doorway with an architrave, a fanlight, and a carved keystone. In the ground floor are a French windows, a bowed casement window, and a sash window with a lintel grooved as voussoirs. In the upper floor are casement windows and horizontally-sliding sash windows.	II
Hardwick Hall Farmhouse; 53.37293°N 1.26955°W	—	Late 18th century	The farmhouse is in sandstone on a plinth, with quoins, and a roof of Welsh slate and pantile with coped gables and kneelers. There are two storeys, three bays, a rear wing on the left, and a later wing infilling the angle. In the centre is a doorway, the windows in the ground floor are casements, in the upper floor they are sashes, and all the window have lintels grooved as voussoirs.	II
Conduit House Farmhouse; 53.36387°N 1.27577°W	—	Early 19th century	The farmhouse is in red sandstone on a plinth, with chamfered quoins and a tile roof. There are two storeys and three bays. The central doorway has an architrave and a pediment, and the windows are casements in architraves. At the rear is a doorway with a bonded surround, and the windows have wedge lintels.	II
Old Coach House; 53.36210°N 1.29838°W	—	Early 19th century	Originally the coach house and stables to High Trees and later converted for residential use, the building is in sandstone with an eaves band and a hipped stone slate roof. There are two storeys and an L-shaped plan, with ranges of three and one bay. The openings include a large round-headed carriage entrance with a quoined surround, doorways, oculi, slit vents, and an inserted French window.	II
Reading Room; 53.36478°N 1.30211°W		Early 19th century (probable)	Originally a school, later a reading room, it is in rendered sandstone with a Welsh slate roof. There is a single storey, one bay on the front and two along the sides. On the front is a porch with a plinth and an entablature, and above are overhanging eaves and a pediment. Along the sides are semicircular-headed windows, and at the rear is a recessed round-headed panel and a casement window.	II
East and west wings and coach house, Aston Hall; 53.36158°N 1.29821°W	—	1826	Two stable blocks and a coach house that have been converted for residential use. They are in red sandstone, each on a plinth, with chamfered quoins, an eaves cornice, and a hipped Westmorland slate roof. Each range has two storeys and five bays, and they enclose three sides of a courtyard. The coach house has three recessed bays containing segmental-arched carriage openings with triple keystones, in the left bay is a doorway with an architrave, and the right bay contains a sash window with an architrave. The east wing is linked to the coach house by a wall incorporating a doorway, and it contains a central doorway and sash windows, all with architraves. The west wing is similar, with some alterations.	II
Barn, Park Hill Farm; 53.36350°N 1.32894°W	—	Early to mid 19th century	The barn on the west side of the farmyard, and later used for other purposes, is in red sandstone, on a plinth, with a floor band, an eaves band, and a hipped Welsh slate roof. There are two storeys and five bays. The barn contains a central wagon entry, a doorway, and slit vents, and in the upper floor are five circular pitching holes.	II
Cowhouse, Park Hill Farm; 53.36336°N 1.32841°W	—	Early to mid 19th century	The cowhouse on the east side of the farmyard is in red sandstone, on a plinth, with a floor band, an eaves band, and a hipped Welsh slate roof. There are two storeys and five bays. The cowhouse contains a doorway with a wedge lintel, windows and altered doorways, and in the upper floor are five circular pitching holes.	II
Entrance gateway and railings, The Lodge; 53.36264°N 1.29778°W		Early to mid 19th century	At the main entrance to Aston Hall are double gates flanked by side gates in cast and wrought iron. The four gate piers are square, and each has a plinth, a shaft with sunken panels, and an egg and dart cornice, and is surmounted by a tripod torchère. From the gateway, railings on a plinth extend on each side to end piers; on the left side they are curved, and on the right side they are straight.	II
Chapel House; 53.37448°N 1.31800°W	—	1843	A Methodist chapel, later extended and converted into a private house, it is in sandstone, the later wing in brick, and it has a Welsh slate roof with coped gables and shaped kneelers. There is one storey, three bays, and a two-storey rear wing on the right. On the front is a later porch with pilasters, a moulded and rusticated surround, and a keystone, and a doorway with a fanlight. The windows are casements, and over the porch is an inscribed and dated plaque.	II
Milepost opposite Lodge Lane; 53.36362°N 1.30786°W		Mid 19th century	The milestone is on the north side of Worksop Road, it is in limestone, and consists of a pillar with a shaped head. Originally it had an inset cast iron plaque inscribed with the distances to Sheffield and Worksop.	II
The Lodge; 53.36249°N 1.29770°W		Mid 19th century	The lodge at the entrance to the grounds of Aston Hall is in sandstone with a hipped slate roof. There is a single storey, an octagonal centre part and side wings. On the centre part is a porch that has a round-headed opening with an architrave, pilasters with voluted capitals, an incised frieze, and a stepped blocking course. The angled side walls have plinths, sill bands, and casement windows with panelled jambs and stylised entablatures. In the side wings are sash windows and cornices, and at the ends are pedimented gables.	II
Milepost southeast of Lodge Lane; 53.35678°N 1.31118°W		Late 19th century	The milestone is on the north side of Mansfield Road, (A618 road). It is in gritstone with cast iron overlay, and has a triangular plan and a rounded top. On the top is inscribed "ROTHERHAM & PLEASLEY ROAD" and "ASTON CUM AUGHTON", and on the sides are the distances to Mansfield, Pleasley, and Rotherham.	II
