= William James Joseph Drury =

English cleric (1791–1878)

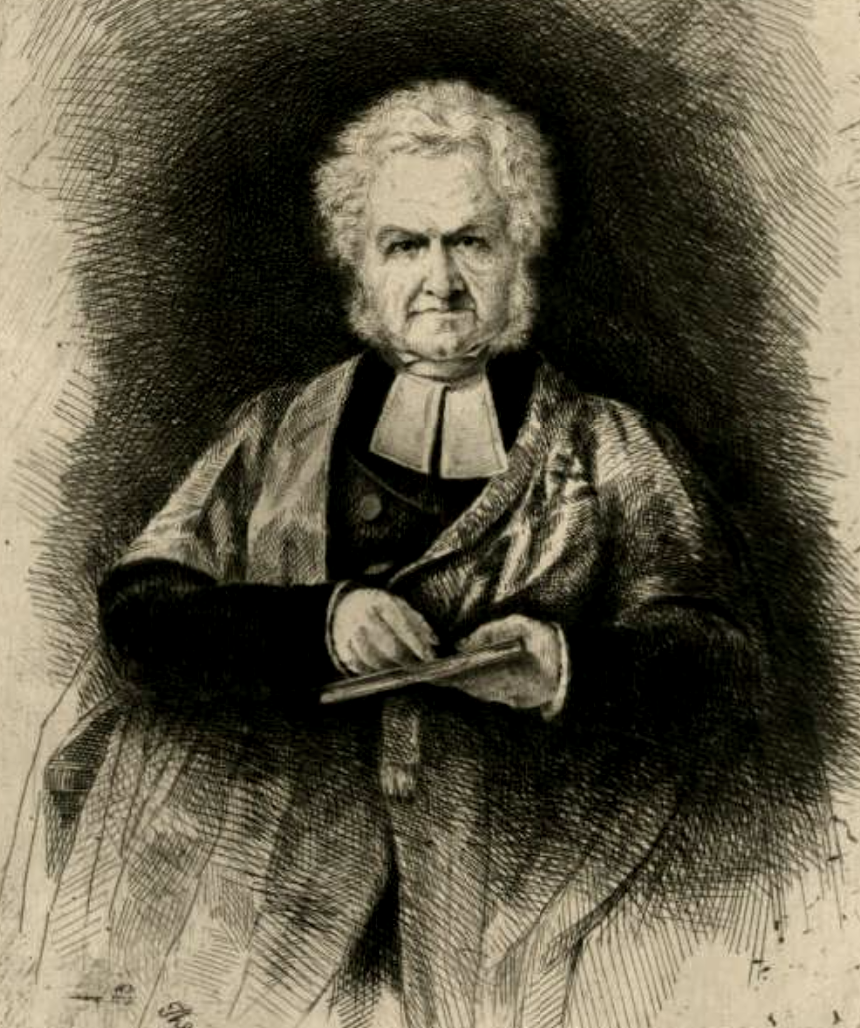
William James Joseph Drury, 1876 engraving

William James Joseph Drury (1791–1878) was an English cleric and schoolmaster, who became chaplain to Leopold I of Belgium, and tutor to his son, the future Leopold II.

== Early life ==
He was the son of the Rev. Mark Drury, a cleric and schoolmaster, brother of Joseph Drury of Harrow School, and an unsuccessful candidate to succeed Joseph in the post in 1805, losing out to George Butler. Like his father, William Drury suffered from a genetic disorder leading to obesity. His mother was Catherine Elizabeth, daughter of Domenico Angelo.

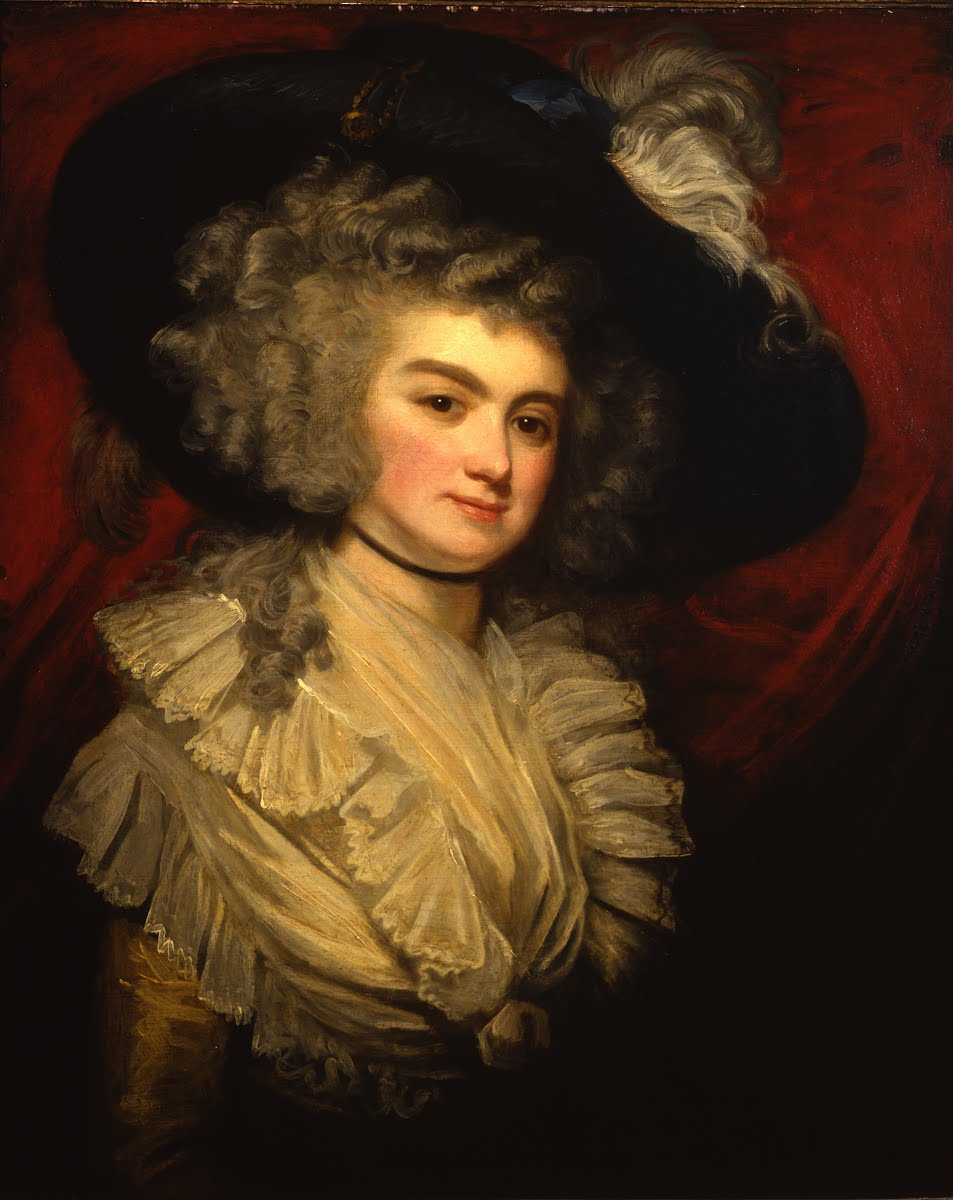
Catherine Angelo, 1786 portrait by Joshua Reynolds, wife of Mark Drury and mother of William Drury

Drury matriculated in 1808 at Trinity College, Oxford, graduating B.A. in 1811, M.A. in 1814. After Oxford, Drury himself became one of the "Drury clan" teaching at Harrow School, rising to be fifth master there. John Allen Giles, who knew Drury later, commented "He belonged to a family of scholars, mostly connected with Harrow, all of them wits, but not economists and therefore poor like Sheridan." In his time at Harrow, Drury was on good terms with Fanny Trollope.

Drury left Harrow in 1826. In February of that year, newspaper reports related the defalcation on debts of his father, and his son John, who had left Harrow unexpectedly. According to Pamela Neville-Sington's biography of Fanny Trollope, the son who left with Mark Drury was William. William's wife Anna died the following year, leaving him with a young family.

== In Brussels ==
By 1828, as related in a letter from Scrope Berdmore Davies to Francis Hodgson, Drury had at least 70 pupils in a school in Brussels, then in the Kingdom of the Netherlands.

According to a number of sources, Drury became the chaplain of the English Chapel in Brussels in 1829. Monica Kendall has questioned the accuracy of accounts of Drury's clerical career. She also offers a history of his school there.

Alumni Oxonienses states that Drury held a post as British Chaplain in Brussels for the rest of his life. Given the presence in Brussels of the Rev. Evan Jenkins, with more official standing, it is not so clear what that meant. In 1839 the Belgian government organised the Protestant churches as a group into a Synod. When Patrick Brontë wrote to arrange for his daughters to visit Brussels, around the end of 1841, he contacted Jenkins, "the Church of England chaplain in Brussels", whose brother Peter he knew.

From about 1840, the situation was of three Anglican priests including Drury who held services on the boulevard de l'Observatoire (Église Évangélique); the other services were in the rue du Musée (Chapelle Royale, high church) and the rue Belliard in the Quartier Léopold (evangelical). A Particular Baptist observer found Drury to be "attentive to his congregation" and "a contrast to the priesthood at home" but his sermon in "want of great and vital truths". Douglas Straight commented favourably in the 1860s on the atmosphere at Sunday matins created by Drury, after attending the service with Frank Newman. The Prince of Wales attended a Sunday service of Drury's in September 1862.

=== Drury's school ===
According to Kendall, Drury took over the Brussels school run by John Jay. The diarist Heinrich Witt (1799–1892) mentions Jay's earlier school, in Woodford Wells outside London, at which he was a pupil in 1815; Jay was a former merchant with a Dutch wife, and the school was in Prospectus House by Epping Forest. Kendall relies on memoirs of Charles Mackay (born 1814) to deduce that Jay's school, by 1821 in Brussels, was bought by Drury. The passage runs:

On the attainment of my fourteenth year, I was transferred to my father's care in Brussels, and was placed at school on the Boulevard de Namur, under the care of a Mr. Jay, who was afterwards succeeded by the Rev. Dr. Drury.

In 1825 Jay's daughter Eliza married the Rev. Evan Jenkins in Brussels. Jenkins, not Drury, was the Anglican chaplain in Brussels with official standing.

Fanny Trollope renewed her acquaintance with Drury, and her son Anthony Trollope at age 19 took a post as usher (assistant teacher) at the school in Brussels. This was during the period in 1834 when her husband's debts meant the whole family moved to Belgium.

In 1839, Drury was living in the rue de l'Orangerie, Brussels, and taking both boarders and day boys. His pupils included George Gore Ousley Higgins.

=== Tutoring ===
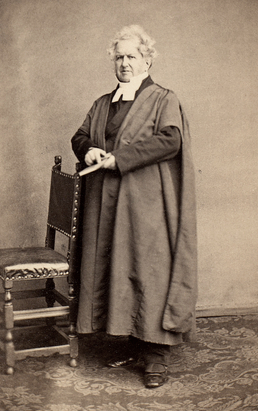
William Drury, 1860 photograph from the collection of Prince Albert

Drury tutored Ernest, Prince of Saxe-Gotha and his brother Albert. This was in the period 1836–7, during which Albert was preparing for the University of Bonn, and first met Princess Victoria. While the brothers were in Brussels, for ten months and under the oversight of Adolphe Quetelet, tutoring by Drury was one of their influences, and letters from him were added to their autograph collection. Their course was dominated by Quetelet's mathematics, and Drury's instruction in English literature.

Drury also tutored the sons of Leopold I, King of the Belgians.

=== Clerical career ===
What might have been called the English Chapel, in 1829, was consecrated by bishop Matthew Luscombe, as St George's Church. Drury was there for 11 years, according to George Edward Biber, the period including the Belgian Revolution of 1830. Initially his church was used exclusively for services in English. W. E. Gladstone heard Drury preach in Brussels, in 1832. In 1834, the address was given as rue de l'Orangerie.

The situation changed when the chapel's lease expired, and was not renewed. Drury had official Belgian recognition as an Anglican pastor, from 1840.

Drury then officiated at the Église Chrétienne et Évangélique, on the boulevard de l'Observatoire; this church was shared, and services in French were held there also. There were pew rents and some support from the Belgian government. The official Almanach for 1852 called it the Chapelle Saint-George.

A handbook of 1847 in the Coghlan's Guide series shows Drury sharing duties with the Rev. Evan Jenkins, for the Sunday services in the rue du Musée. The ACAD database entry for Jenkins, with an addition by Kendall to the original Alumni Cantabrigienses text, states that Jenkins died in Brussels in 1849. (That entry flags an ambiguity over which Evan Jenkins was the Trinity College graduate, which is resolved by the Edinburgh Annual Register.)

=== From the 1860s ===
In August 1862 Drury accompanied the Duke of Brabant (the future Leopold II) on a visit to the United Kingdom, on the SS Diamant, starting from Ostend. The itinerary included the Woolwich Arsenal and the 1862 International Exhibition. Later that year he became chaplain to Leopold I.

A letter of 1864 from Charles Lever to John Blackwood related an alleged anecdote of Drury, the improvident husband and father, saying:

"When I have dined heartily and well, and drunk my little bottle of light Bordeaux ... where Mrs Drury or the children are to get their supper tonight, or their breakfast tomorrow, I vow to God I don't know, and I don't care.

Drury died in Brussels in 1878, aged 86, 19 days after his wife.

== Works ==
- The Memory of the Just is Blessed (1850), funeral sermon for Louise of Orléans.

== Family ==
Drury married, firstly, in 1816, at St Marylebone Church, Anna Frances Tayler, daughter of Archdale Wilson Tayler, and sister of John Frederick Tayler; his first cousin Henry Joseph Thomas Drury had married in 1808 Caroline, one of her sisters. Anna died in 1827, at Hastings. Their children included:

- Catherine Frances, (1819/20–1895) died in Torquay, aged 75.
- Arthur James Drury (1820/1–1880, died at age 59), Foreign Office messenger.
- Anna Harriett Drury (1824–1912), born in Harrow, novelist.

He married secondly, in 1828, in Brussels, Anne Nicholas, daughter of Robert Nicholas, Member of Parliament for Cricklade, and his second wife Ann, daughter of John Shepherd Clark. Their children included:

- Edward Robert Drury (1832–1896), born in Brussels, soldier and banker in Australia.
- Albert Victor Drury (1837–1907), born in Brussels, from 1862 in Australia, public servant in Queensland.
- Mark Henry Drury, married 1862 Matilda Sidgwick, younger daughter of John Benson Sidgwick of Riddlesden Hall, Keighley.
- Emma Amelia, died 1861 in Brussels aged 20.
