= Scrope Berdmore Davies =

English dandy and friend of Lord Byron

Scrope Berdmore Davies (1782–1852), often given incorrectly as Scrope Beardmore Davies, was an English dandy of the Regency period. He is known as a friend of Lord Byron, the dedicatee of Byron's poem Parisina. He is the subject of a 1981 biography.

== Early life ==
He was born in 1782 in Horsley, Gloucestershire, the second son in a family of six sons and four daughters—or four sons and three daughters, according to William Prideaux Courtney—of the Rev. Richard Davies (1747–1825), and his wife Margaretta Berdmore, daughter of Scrope Berdmore. He was educated at Eton College, and was admitted to King's College, Cambridge in 1802, graduating B.A. in 1806, and M.A. in 1809. He became a Fellow of King's in 1805, and remained one for the rest of his life.

== Associations to 1820 ==
Davies was a noted Georgian and Regency period wit: his recorded witticisms include put-downs of Charles Augustus Tulk and Frederick Goulburn. Byron put one of his jokes, made against Beau Brummell's efforts to learn French, into Beppo.

In London Davies became one of the group of close literary friends around Byron that comprised also John Hookham Frere, John Cam Hobhouse, and Douglas Kinnaird. Byron called them the "Synod" or "Utican Senate". Of Byron's friends, Davies and Hobhouse were the two who saw him off at Dover as he left England in April 1816, and Byron gave Davies a parcel and a message for Margaret Mercer Elphinstone. The "Synod" group kept in touch with Byron, writing via Hobhouse in January 1819 to advise against the publication of Don Juan.

Brummell was another of Davies's associates, from Eton days. He left England in 1816 too, escaping financial troubles. His last letter, written before departing, was to Davies, asking to borrow money. Davies refused to help. Later that year Davies and Hobhouse travelled to the Villa Diodati to visit Byron, and on the way saw Brummell in Calais. Brummell's inner circle, to which Davies belonged, included William Arden, 2nd Baron Alvanley, who stepped into his shoes as the ton's leading influence. Others in that set were Joshua Allen, 6th Viscount Allen known as "King" Allen, Thomas Foley, 3rd Baron Foley, Sir Henry Mildmay and Lord Sidney Godolphin Osborne. In 1813 Davies challenged Lord Foley to a duel: the matter was smoothed over by Byron. Charles Greville wrote of "that set of roués and spendthrifts who were at the height of the fashion for some years", including in it John Payne.

Also in 1816, Davies and Hobhouse joined Brooks's, in a group of other Whigs including Leicester Stanhope and Thomas Raikes. Raikes was a long-time friend, who kept in touch with Davies in his own exile.

If considered frivolous by Byron, in politics Davies was a Whig radical, and in 1818 became a founding member of the "Rota Club", a name harking back to 1659 and the republican James Harrington. It was the social face of the electoral committee of Francis Burdett for his Westminster constituency. Byron by this time was in Italy, but the overlap with Byron's friends was considerable: both Hobhouse and Kinnaird also belonged, and the three campaigned for Burdett in 1819, at personal cost. Other members were Henry Bickersteth, Michael Bruce and Sir Robert Wilson.

At Burdett's house in Ramsbury, Davies met Thomas Moore in 1818, and for a time they were on good terms. Moore dined with Gentleman Jackson the pugilist in Davies's rooms. He went with Davies to see the prizefight between Jack Randall and Ned Turner at Crawley Down.

== Gambler ==
Davies gambled in Watier's, Brooks's and other London clubs, particularly at hazard for high stakes, In 1814 Davies reported to Hobhouse a win of over £6000 at Watier's at macao, like hazard a dice game dependent on the calculation of odds. Captain Gronow wrote that he was a "lucky player", but eventually had little more than his Cambridge fellowship to live on.

== In exile ==
In financial difficulties, Davies left the United Kingdom in January 1820. He settled in Ostend for a time, and did not return. In 1822 he became a senior Fellow of King's College, Cambridge. He was later in Boulogne, and he died in lodgings on the rue Duras, Paris. With him was Hopkins Northey, an English acquaintance from his Brussels circle of expatriates.

Davies corresponded with English friends. In a letter to Francis Hodgson in 1828, he writes of encountering Sir James Webster-Wedderburn, another dandy of Byron's circle, and his wife Lady Frances with whom he had had an affair, the former in a mocking tone and the latter suggestively in Latin. He also mentions William James Joseph Drury (1791–1878), as a schoolmaster in Brussels. Another correspondent was Christopher Hughes the American diplomat, a friend from about 1826, met perhaps in Ostend or Brussels.

== Dress ==
Surviving tailor's bills for Davies are evidence for the priorities of "dandy" dressing for followers of Brummell. This was in an understated style, which can be traced back to the traditions of the Eton Montem. Key items were white shirts and neckties, light-coloured waistcoats, braces to keep up pantaloons, Hessian boots, and dark blue jackets cut away into tails. Underwear was absent. Another supposed influence on the style was the rural dress of Coke of Norfolk.

== Trunk legacy ==
Before leaving the country in 1820, Davies packed a trunk with personal papers and some literary manuscripts, and deposited it at a London private bank, properly (from 1818) then called Ransom & Co., where Kinnaird was the manager. The bank later became part of the Barclays group, and Barclays had it opened, in 1976.

Of prime literary interest in the trunk were manuscripts of poems. There was one of the third canto of Childe Harold's Pilgrimage, and of Percy Bysshe Shelley's Hymn to Intellectual Beauty and Mont Blanc in early drafts. There were also letters: from Byron, and from Lady Frances Webster (not clearly dated, but written during the period after her 1818 separation from her husband, when Davies was seriously involved in a relationship with her, and in some way with Lady Caroline Lamb). The personal papers included notes on gambling.
