= 0114 =

National dialling code for Sheffeld, United Kingdom

United Kingdom area code for Sheffield
- National calling: 0114
- International calling: +44 114
- Conservation: No
- Active since: 16 April 1995
- Previous code: 0742
- Number format: 0114 xxx xxxx

Coverage
- Area served: Aston; Aughton; Killamarsh; Sheffield; Ulley; Wortley

0114 is the national dialling code for Sheffield in the United Kingdom. The area it serves includes almost all of the City of Sheffield and some adjacent areas. When STD codes were first introduced, Sheffield was assigned the mnemonic 0SH2 (which corresponded to 0742 on a rotary dial), later changing to the corresponding numbers upon the introduction of All-Figure Dialling in the area. Instead of the expected 01742 code, Sheffield's area code changed to the current 0114 code on 16 April 1995, along with four other cities in England (Leeds; 0113, Nottingham; 0115, Leicester; 0116 and Bristol; 0117), as part of PhONEday. All subscriber numbers within the area code consist of seven digits. The code is used at several telephone exchanges as part of a linked numbering scheme. In common with all other British area codes the initial '0' is a trunk prefix that is not required when dialling Sheffield from abroad.

== History ==
Before 1965, Sheffield had 5-digit telephone numbers, with the first digit indicating the exchange area of the telephone line. Sheffield's 6-digit numbers were implemented by prefixing the original 5-digit numbers with a duplicate of the first digit (seen below), other than the 2xxxx numbers which were prefixed by 7 (as seen by the last example). This grouped telephone numbers centrally in the 1 to 9 range with a larger "buffer" at the extremes.

Exchange Area	Area Affected	Original Number System	New Number System
3	Hillsborough	3xxxx	33x-xxx
4	Brightside/Attercliffe	4xxxx	44x-xxx
5	Heeley/Abbeydale	5xxxx	55x-xxx
6	Crookes/Broomhill	6xxxx	66x-xxx
7	City Centre	2xxxx	72x-xxx

Switching to 6-digit numbers produced 90,000 available numbers for each exchange group, providing another 450,000 available numbers after combining both phases, producing a potential 500,000 numbers in Sheffield.

=== Between regions ===
Until the 1980s, Stocksbridge, Oughtibridge, and some other areas had 4-digit numbers. Within Stocksbridge and Oughtibridge people dialed only 4-digit numbers, while from Sheffield people dialed prefix 88 for Stocksbridge and prefix 86 for Oughtibridge. From Oughtibridge, people dialed 88xxxx for Stocksbridge and 9xxxxxx for Sheffield. This led to some confusion, leading people to often dial wrong numbers. During the 1980s these local areas were unified into 6-digit Sheffield numbers so that from anywhere in the Sheffield code area, 88xxxx dialed a Stocksbridge number, even from within Stocksbridge. Once the 8-prefix was merged into the full local number this released 8xxxxx numbers.

=== Transition to 7-digit system ===
Transitioning to 7-digit numbers in 1995 involved prefixing each 6-digit number with a 2. Immediately after the 1995 change, the corresponding 22x-xxxx numbers became available for allocation, followed by the 20x-xxxx and 21x-xxxx ranges, since the corresponding 0742 0xxxxx and 1xxxxx could not be issued as local numbers cannot start with a 1 or a 0, these being the prefix for the operator and area code dialling respectively. The 0114 code allows for a potential maximum of 7,990,000 local numbers to be issued, assuming the use of the entire valid range from (0114) 200-0000 to (0114) 998-9999 country-wide.

== Coverage ==
The 0114 dialing code includes the whole of Sheffield except for Midhopestones area which uses the Barnsley 01226 dialling code and the Fox House area which uses dialing code 01433. The codes extends beyond the City of Sheffield to include the Killamarsh area of North East Derbyshire and the Aston, Aughton, and Ulley areas of Rotherham.

== Number allocation ==
Under the National Telephone Numbering Plan the code operates with the following sub-ranges:

0114
0xx xxxx 1xx xxxx	national dialling only, not issued locally
2xx xxxx	local numbers transferred from 0742
3xx xxxx	new local numbers created by move to 0114 (issued from 2004)
4xx xxxx	new local numbers created by move to 0114 (issued from 2010)
5xx xxxx 6xx xxxx	free
7xx xxxx 8xx xxxx 9xx xxxx	protected

Sheffield (0114) - 2xx - xxxx numbers have now been exhausted, so new numbers issued now begin with 3 or 4, rather than the old ones being reused. There have reportedly been many problems involving people incorrectly dialing 01142 3xx - xxxx for 0114 3xx - xxxx numbers and therefore being connected to the wrong person or business.

The area code is not subject to number conservation and the regulator Ofcom does not restrict the size of number blocks that are allocated.

== Trivia ==
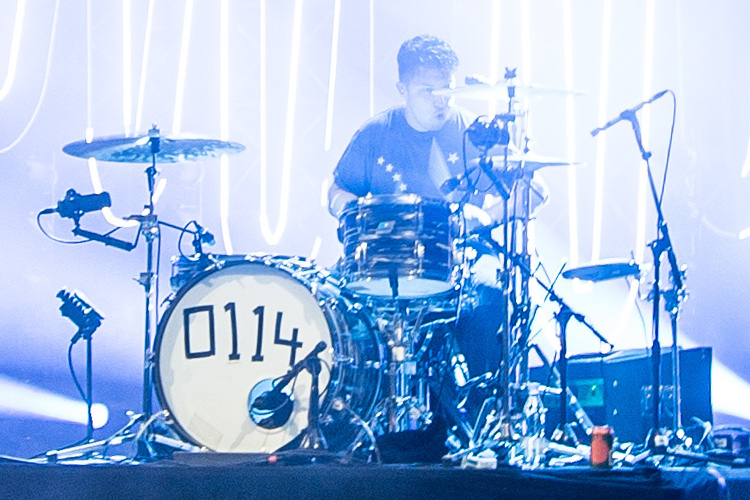
Arctic Monkeys drummer Matt Helders with the dialling code in his drum kit

In 2013, Matt Helders, drummer of Sheffield band Arctic Monkeys, added the 0114 dialling code to the cover of his drum kit, in honour of the band's hometown.
