= Aughton, South Yorkshire =

Village in South Yorkshire, England

Coordinates: 53.36°N 01.32°W

Aughton
- Village
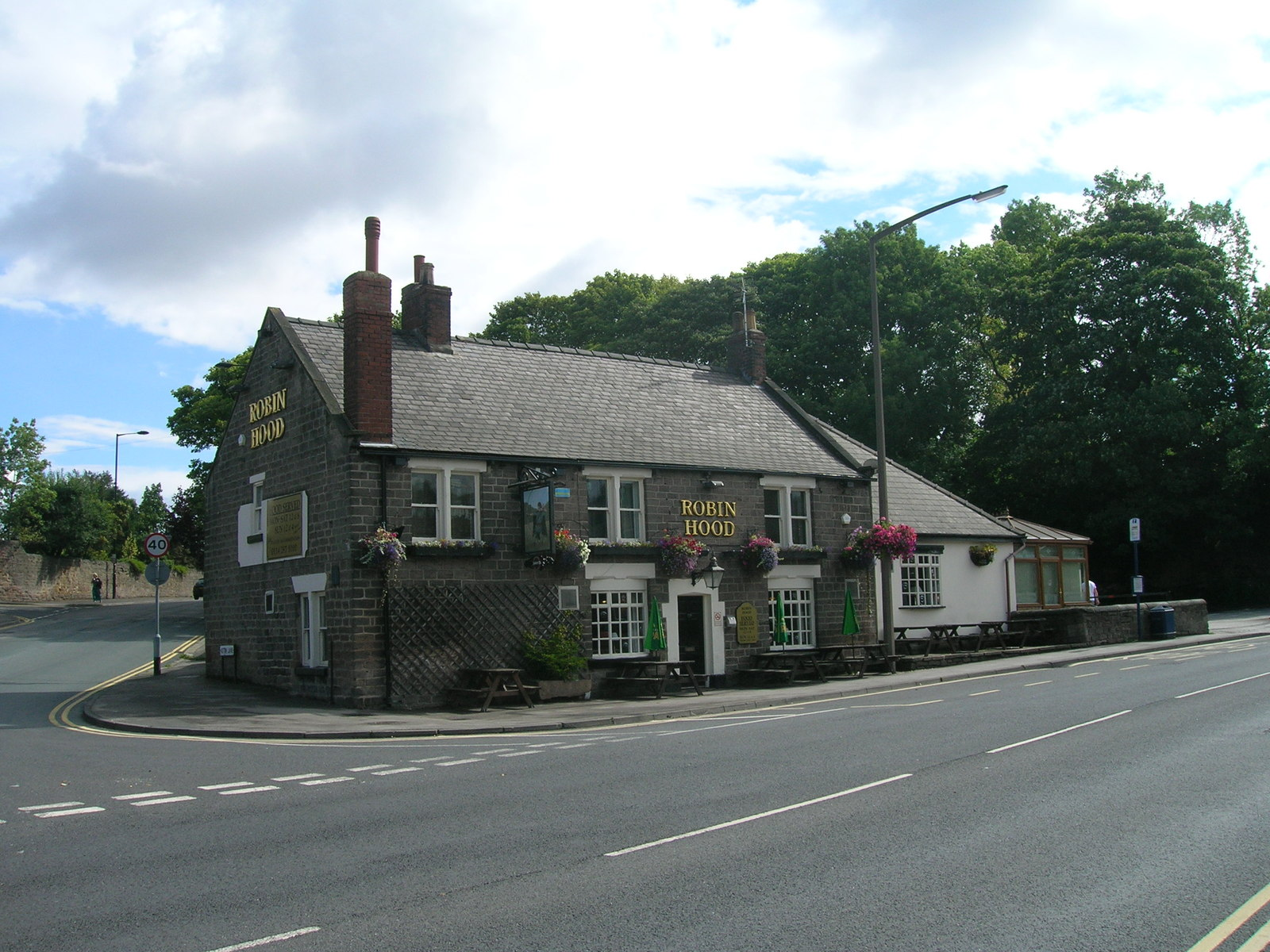
- The Robin Hood

- Location within South Yorkshire
- OS grid reference: SK4586
- Civil parish: Aston cum Aughton
- Metropolitan borough: Rotherham
- Metropolitan county: South Yorkshire
- Region: Yorkshire and the Humber
- Country: England
- Sovereign state: United Kingdom
- Post town: SHEFFIELD
- Postcode district: S26
- Dialling code: 0114
- Police: South Yorkshire
- Fire: South Yorkshire
- Ambulance: Yorkshire

Aughton is a village near Rotherham in South Yorkshire, England, located in the civil parish of Aston cum Aughton, 4 miles (6 km) south of Rotherham. The village setting is rural, being surrounded by fields. The nearest settlements are Guilthwaite in the north, Ulley in the east, Aston in the southeast, Swallownest in the south, and Treeton in the northwest. Major roads are A618 running north–south and B6067 running northwest–southeast which cross in the northern part of the village and share a common alignment along the northern 300 yards (270 m) of Main Street.

The name Aughton derives from the Old English āctūn meaning the 'settlement at the oak'.

Aughton was mentioned in 1066 in the Domesday Book as belonging to three Anglo-Saxon lords. By 1086, it had passed to Richard of Sourdeval, whose tenant-in-chief was Count Robert of Mortain.

== See also ==
- Listed buildings in Aston cum Aughton
