= Aston Academy =

Aston School

Location
- Aughton Road; Swallownest; Sheffield, South Yorkshire, S26 4SF; England; 53.3688°N 1.3227°W

Information
- Type: Academy
- Established: 1957
- Local authority: Sheffield
- Specialist: maths and computing (Operational)
- Department for Education URN: 136718 Tables
- Ofsted: Reports
- Chair of Governors: John Barton
- Principal: James Graham
- Gender: Co-educational
- Age: 11 to 18
- Enrolment: 1,644
- Capacity: 1,678
- Houses: Melton, Darcy, Furnival, Verelst
- Website: http://www.astonacademy.org/

Aston Academy (formerly Aston Comprehensive School until 30 April 2011) is a secondary school with academy status at Swallownest in the Metropolitan Borough of Rotherham, South Yorkshire, England.

== History ==
=== Grammar school ===
Woodhouse Grammar School opened in 1909. The headmaster of the grammar school was Frank Pinion until 1962.

=== Secondary modern school ===
In 1953, the new buildings for the secondary modern school was to cost £105,000. The first headmaster from 1944 was William Albert V Hoskins. In the May 1955 and October 1959 general elections, he was the Conservative candidate for Rother Valley. In May 1961 Mr Hopkins retired.

The new school buildings first opened in 1957 as Swallownest County Secondary School with the original school buildings completed in 1957 and which still stand today.

=== Comprehensive ===
In 1962, as a result of the amalgamation of Swallownest County Secondary School and Woodhouse Grammar School.

In October 1964, a biology teacher, Peter Horton, was the Labour candidate for Grantham and Sleaford. He was chosen as the candidate in May 1962, when aged 38, and teaching at Woodhouse Grammar School. He was married with three daughters. He lived at 55a Furniss Avenue in Dore, South Yorkshire, and often campaigned against the 11-plus. In late May 1967, he became the Chairman of Sheffield Education Committee.

The school changed its name to Aston Woodhouse High School with further buildings added in 1965 and in 1996. In 1974 the school was placed within the Rotherham Local Authority and became Aston Comprehensive School.

In 1981 a school team reached the semi-finals of Top of the Form radio competition, where the school team competed against Girvan Academy of Scotland. Girvan won with 91 points, which is the highest in the radio series history. Girvan won the competition.

In 2011, the Aston Comprehensive School took advantage of the 2010 Academies Act, which allows a school to apply to the Secretary of State to convert to academy and formed Aston Community Education Trust (company number 07577113)

At the start of the 2011-year term, former basketball player and coach Peter Scantlebury was appointed as Y11 Pastoral Manager.

Previous headteachers have been Hoskins, Woodlands, Watson, Lowe, Light, Neal and Newton, Curren, Saeed. James Graham is the current principle

== Aston Community Education Trust Management ==
Following conversion to an academy, Mrs. Eunice Newton (trust member until 2017) was promoted to the role of chief executive officer.

As reported by Companies House, the four People with Significant Control are:

- Timothy Baum-Dixon
- John Barton (Retired)
- Paul John Bennet (also managing director of Clark & Partners, Mobility & Agecare Ltd, Mobility & Agecare Centres Ltd.)
- Ron Dyson (no occupation)

The company has a further 18 officers.

== Recognition ==
Before converting to an academy, Aston Comprehensive School was rated as 'Outstanding' by Ofsted in 2010. Since conversion Aston Academy has been downgraded to the lower 'Good' rating following inspections in 2014 and 2018. Data published by Ofsted in 2013 reports that 55% of children from disadvantaged backgrounds make expected progress compared to national standards.

=== Ofsted inspections ===
Since the commencement of Ofsted inspections in September 1993, the school has undergone seven inspections:

Date of inspection	Outcome	Reference
26–30 September 1994	???	
8–12 February 1999	Good	Report
1–5 November 2004	Satisfactory	Report
28–29 November 2007	Satisfactory	Report
29–30 November 2010	Outstanding	Report
4–5 February 2014	Good	Report
13 June 2018	Good	Report

== Community Education Trust ==
In 2011 Aston Comprehensive School was given permission to form the Aston Community Education Trust, breaking away from Rotherham Metropolitan Borough Council to set up a state-maintained independent Academy school, which has control of its own budget, is able to source its services from private providers, and has flexibility of curriculum. The Trust is a registered limited company incorporated on 24 March 2011. The company is registered under Companies House (company no. 07577113). Carol Davidson and Patricia Graham were appointed directors at the date of incorporation but later resigned: Davidson on 11 November 2011, and Graham on 31 July 2011. On 19 December 2012, nine directors were terminated, leaving only six directors with the additional appointment of another.

On announcement of the governors' intention to convert, a joint NUT, NASUWT and ATL union meeting was convened and staff voted to oppose Academy status – a letter to this effect was addressed to the governors.

=== Changes to the Trust ===
On the month of the one year anniversary of academy conversion (May 2012) the academy directors annexed the trust's Articles of Association document making amendments to the previous nature of the organisation as a Comprehensive School and a new academy. This resolution increases the independence and autonomy of the trust and gives the directors greater powers, more in line with those of a conventional business. Some of the main powers include the ability to:

- Form private companies to carry on any trade or business for the purpose of raising funds for the academy.
- To buy and sell property including existing school buildings and land.
- Offer scholarships to present and former students.
- To raise and borrow money.

In addition school property can be held in the name of a nominee private company acting under the control of the directors.

Thurcroft Junior Academy for pupils aged 7 to 11 at Thurcroft, is administered by Aston Community Education Trust.

== Admissions ==
Ages for attendance at Aston are 11–16 years (Year 7 to Year 11), and 16–18 years (Year 12 to Year 13) for Aston's sixth form. Most pupils at the school are from the Aston-cum-Aughton area, with other pupils from nearby villages such as Beighton, Woodhouse and Treeton.

== Notable former pupils ==
- Ron Hillyard, footballer

=== Woodhouse Grammar School ===
- Keith Angus, former head boy, long-distance runner, ran the marathon at the 1976 Summer Olympics (31st with 2:22:18) in Canada, when a history teacher in Nottingham
- John Bingham (pianist)
- Philip Hodgson, cricketer
- Mike Smedley, captain from 1975 to 1979 of Nottinghamshire cricket team, from Kiveton Park
