= James Wedderburn-Webster =

British Army officer and dandy

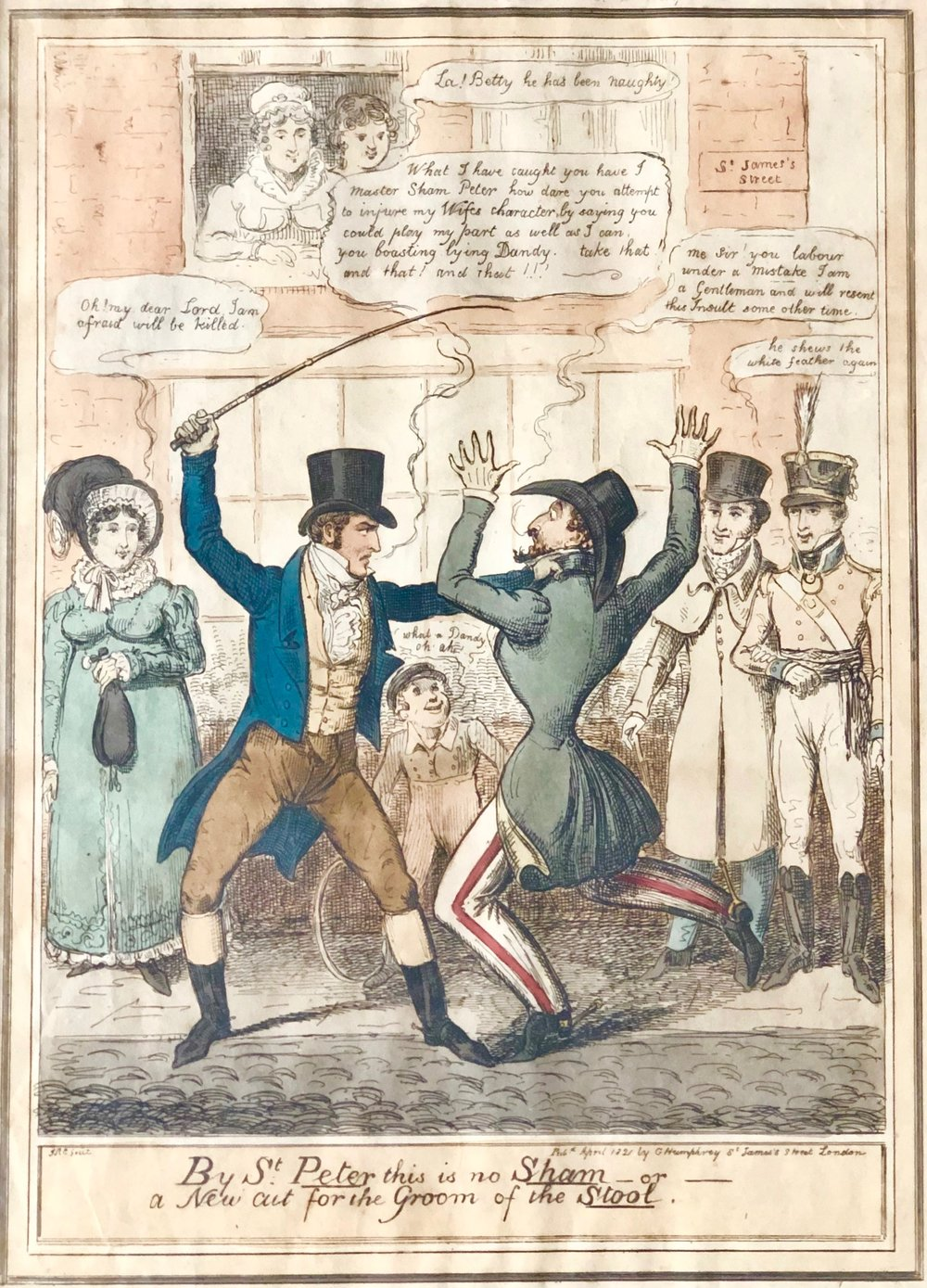
Wedderburn-Webster with horsewhip and Viscount Petersham, 1821 engraving

Sir James Wedderburn-Webster (1788–1840), often known as James Webster or Bold Webster, was a British Army officer and dandy. He was a longtime friend of Lord Byron.

== Early life ==
He was the son of David Webster (died 1801), a West India merchant in London, born David Wedderburn. His father changed his name in accordance with the will of his business partner James Webster (died 1789) with an interest in the Richmond Vale estate in Jamaica (the family relationship being that James Webster was a son by a second marriage of David Wedderburn's maternal grandmother Beatrix Proctor). His mother was Elizabeth Read the daughter of Alexander Read of Logie near Dundee. She married again, after David's death, in 1802 to Robert Douglas of Brigton (1773–1835), elder brother of William Douglas of Balgillo; they had a son, William. The family home in Shenley, Hertfordshire was sold, and Langham House in Suffolk, was rented. (Rather than being near Sproughton, as Stewart suggests, it may be the Langham Hall near Stratford St. Mary in a contemporary itinerary.)

James was in early life known as James Wedderburn Webster. He had John Campbell as Latin tutor from 1798. Campbell left the household in 1800, but became a legal adviser to the family. Webster was sent in September 1800 to Harrow School, but was there for less than a term.

== Army officer ==
Webster joined the 10th Regiment of Dragoons, in 1804. As a young man, before reaching the age of majority in 1809, he performed in the Corinthian fashion as a sporting amateur. He took boxing lessons from "Gentleman" John Jackson. He was a pedestrian, walking as a bet from Ipswich to Whitechapel within 24 hours, with Jackson; and later, for another bet (reported in The Times in 1807), covering the same distance by horse in five hours. He rode from Westminster Bridge to Brighton in 200 minutes. He attended the 1809 prizefight between Jem Belcher and Tom Cribb.

Having come into his estate, Webster then gambled most of it away within four years. He was the backer of the pedestrian feat by Robert Barclay Allardice ("Captain Barclay") in the period 1 June to 12 July 1809, of walking 1000 miles in 1000 successive hours, at Newmarket.

In February 1811 Webster was granted arms by the Lord Lyon King of Arms, and later in the month attended a royal levee in which he was presented to the Prince Regent.

Arms of Webster-Wedderburn

== The Websters and Lord Byron ==
Lord Byron's recollection, in 1823, was that he met Webster during his time at Cambridge (i.e. 1805 to 1808), and "Bold Webster", his nickname, was a cavalry officer; in an 1813 letter to Webster he mentions their acquaintance in 1806–7. While a number of sources imply that Webster studied at Cambridge at this time, that is incorrect. In 1809 Webster attended a house party at Byron's family seat, Newstead Abbey. Other guests were Scrope Davies, John Cam Hobhouse and Charles Skinner Matthews, and the entertainment was mostly boyish pranks.

After his marriage, Webster took temporary leave from his army post. The couple lived for a time in a house he owned in Clapham, just south of London. There Webster and the Marquess of Tweeddale met in January 1811 the prizefighter Heskin Rimmer, who shortly was stopped in a bout at Moulsey Hurst by the African-American Tom Molineaux. The Websters were living at Wimborne in Dorset, during 1811, at Dean's Court.

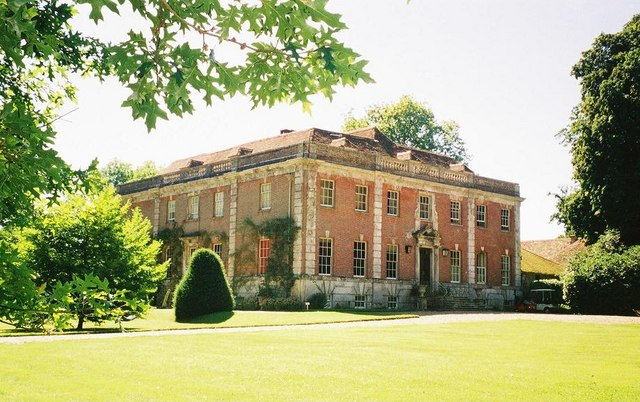
Dean's Court, Wimborne today

Webster then rented Aston Hall in southern Yorkshire. It was from the times in 1813 when Byron stayed there with the Websters that a correspondence between Frances and Byron arose: it lasted until the end of his life. She had first met Byron in 1811. At the end of 1813 Byron published The Bride of Abydos, and there is a critical consensus that it reflects his feelings for both Augusta Leigh, his half-sister, and Frances Webster, with whom there was an "intense relationship".

== Later life ==
In the Waterloo Campaign of 1815, Webster and his wife Frances attended the Duchess of Richmond's ball on the eve of the battle. At Waterloo itself, Webster served on the staff of Lord Uxbridge. At this time Frances was a close friend of the Duke of Wellington. Gossip about her relationship with the Duke led to a successful libel action in 1816 (see below).

At the beginning of April 1821, Webster administered a public thrashing to Viscount Petersham, the future Charles Stanhope, 4th Earl of Harrington, in St James's Street, London. Webster accused Petersham, who had been flirting with his wife Frances, of damaging her reputation. There was a press report of the incident on 5 April, and a number of satirical prints appeared on the theme. After public correspondence, with Thomas Foley, 3rd Baron Foley acting for Petersham, and Colonel Charles Palmer for Webster, the two fought a duel on 21 April in Coombe Wood on the southern edge of London. Both survived an exchange of shots unharmed, and Webster, attempting to save his marriage (Lady Frances was pregnant at the time), moved to Boulogne with her.

In 1822 Webster was knighted. That year, he was attempting a love affair with Lady Hardy, wife of Sir Thomas Hardy, 1st Baronet. (She in turn was at that time conducting "a kind of love affair on paper" with Byron, a distant relative of hers.)

Experiencing financial difficulties during the 1830s, Webster applied after the Slavery Abolition Act 1833 for compensation on his father's Jamaican estate interest, which by 1798 had been in the Fontabelle estate, and also for the Blackheath estate. The applications are thought to have failed.

== Family ==
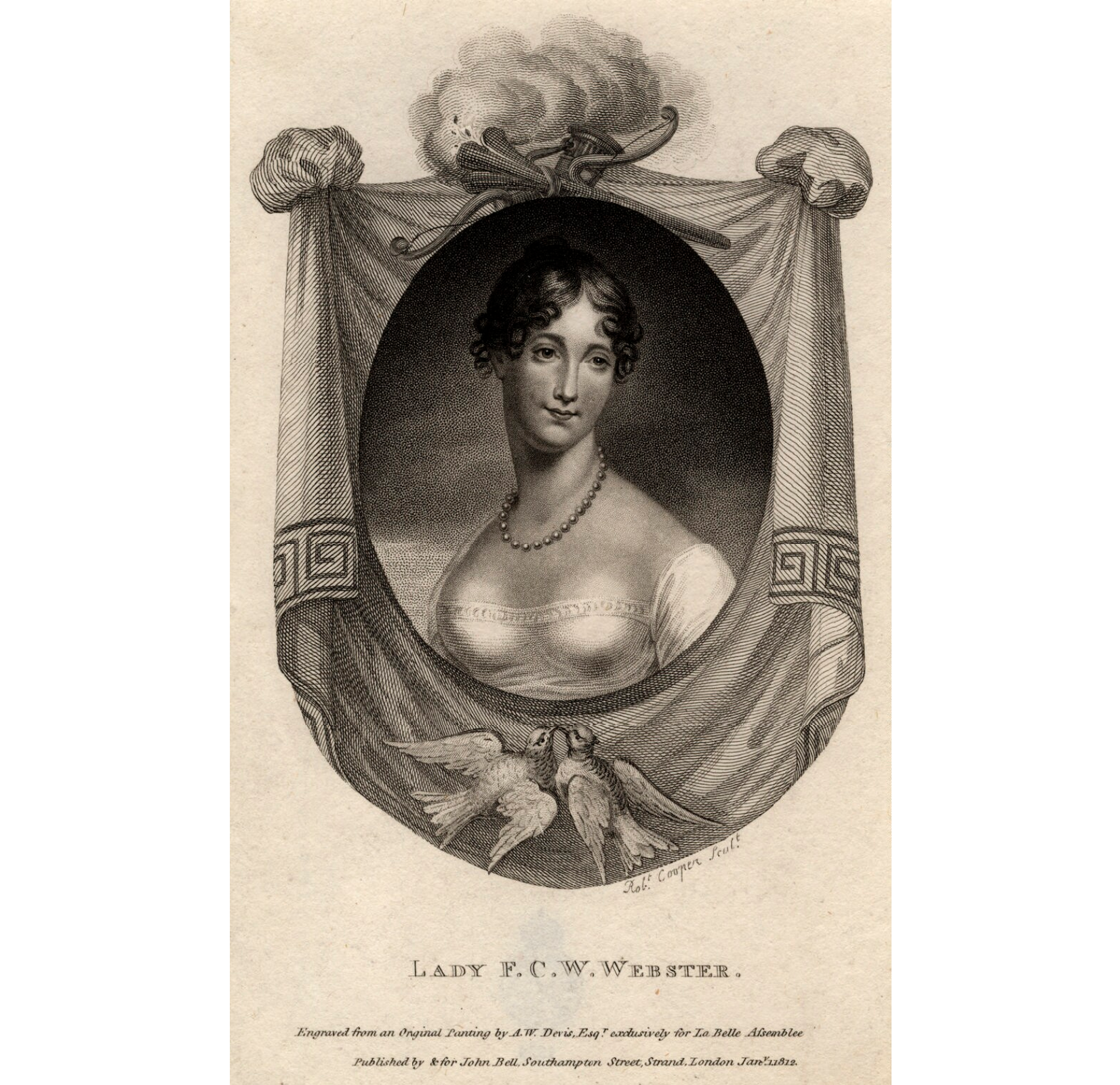
Lady Frances Webster, 1812 engraving

Webster-Wedderburn married in 1810 Frances Caroline Annesley, daughter of Arthur Annesley, 1st Earl of Mountnorris. She was known as Frances Webster, and Lady Frances Webster with her courtesy title as an Earl's daughter (before her husband's knighthood). They had four sons and a daughter:

- Charles Byron (1811–1813)
- Charles Francis (1820–1886)
- Augustus George Henry Desiré (1821–1845)
- George Gordon Gerard Trophime de Lally-Tollendal (1827–1875) (see Marquis de Lally-Tollendal)
- Lucy Anne (died 1864)

The marriage was not happy, and was the subject of public speculation. The couple brought a libel action against the St James Chronicle in 1815, with John Campbell acting for them, over repeated hints that Frances was having an affair with the Duke of Wellington. Webster was awarded damages of £2000 against Charles Baldwin, editor and proprietor of the Chronicle.

The couple were separated in 1818, James being at Nantes and Frances remaining in England, where she had an affair. Frances left James in 1821. A temporary reconciliation in 1827 led to the birth of a son, George, at the end of the year.
