= Aston, South Yorkshire =

Village in South Yorkshire, England

Coordinates: 53.3581°N 1.30988°W

Aston
- Village
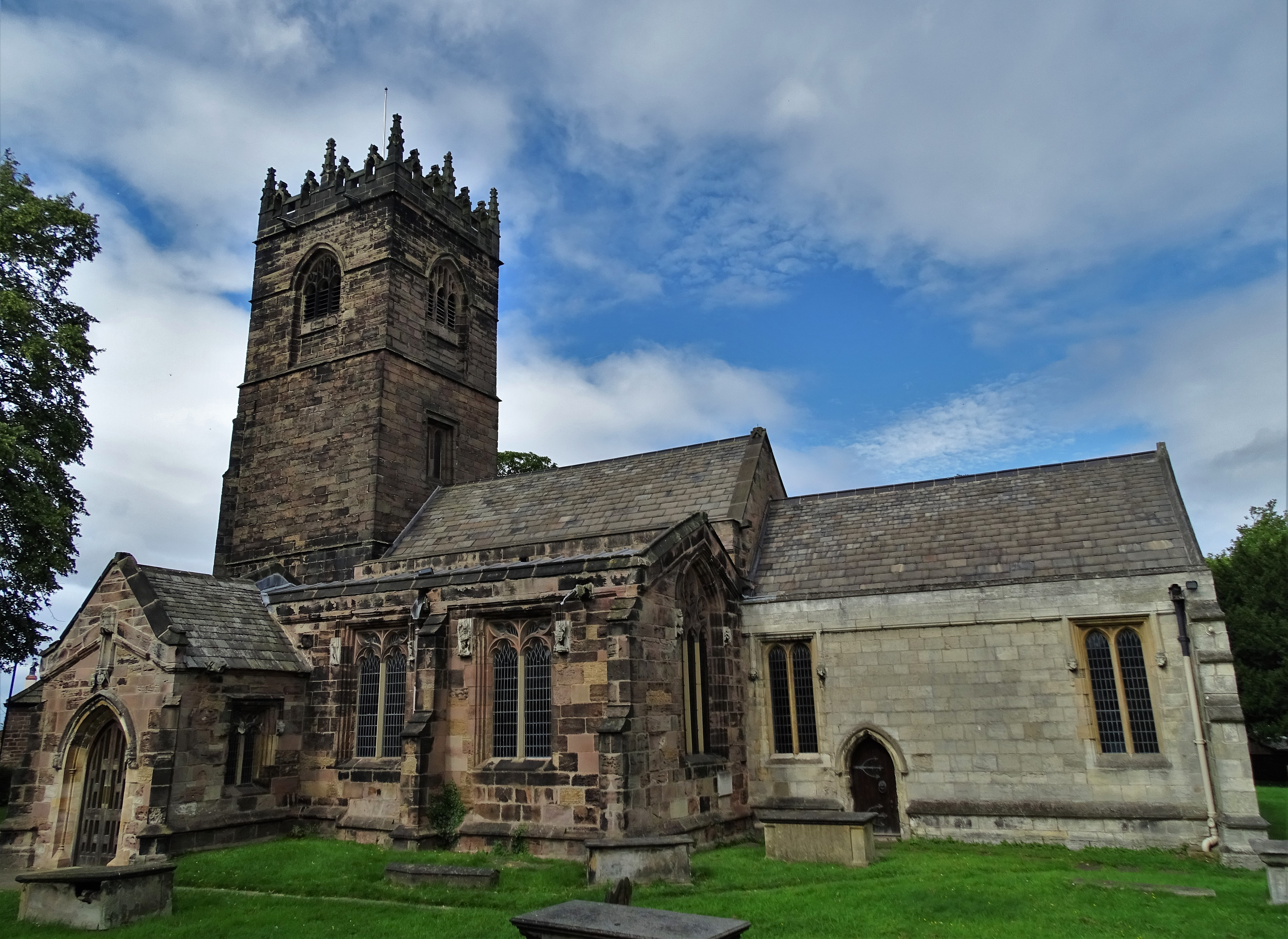
- All Saints' church

- Location within South Yorkshire
- OS grid reference: SK460848
- Civil parish: Aston cum Aughton
- Metropolitan borough: Rotherham
- Metropolitan county: South Yorkshire
- Region: Yorkshire and the Humber
- Country: England
- Sovereign state: United Kingdom
- Post town: SHEFFIELD
- Postcode district: S26
- Dialling code: 0114
- Police: South Yorkshire
- Fire: South Yorkshire
- Ambulance: Yorkshire
- UK Parliament: Rother Valley

Aston is a village in the Metropolitan Borough of Rotherham, South Yorkshire, England. The village falls within the Holderness ward of the borough. Aston is approximately 2 miles (3 km) from Rother Valley Country Park and about 6 miles (9.7 km) from Rotherham town centre.

== History ==
Aston was traditionally a farming village and some old farm buildings still line the main road. In the early 20th century the population increased because of the opening of coal mines in the area.

It joined local villages Aughton and Swallownest, to form the Aston cum Aughton civil parish.

=== Etymology ===
Unlike other places of the same name, Aston does not mean "eastern farm or village," but instead originates from the Old English words tun "farm, village, and estate" with an uncertain first element. The name was recorded as Essetone (which was first documented in the Domesday Book) in 1039, suggesting Old English ǣsc "ash tree" (as in Ashton and Ashton-in-Makerfield), although this is not certain.

== Landmarks ==
=== Aston Hall ===
At the eastern end of the village is Grade II* listed Aston Hall which was a large country house, afterwards a hospital, and at one time known as Aughton Court before becoming a hotel and restaurant. It gives its name to Aston Hall Cricket Club, which plays home games close to the Hall.

=== Church of All Saints ===
Adjacent to Aston Hall is the oldest surviving structure in the village, the Grade I listed Church of All Saints. It is built on the site of earlier church listed in the Domesday Book, and parts of it date to 12th, 14th and 15th centuries though with restoration works including rebuilding of the chancel in the 19th century. Monuments in the church include two wall plaques to William Mason, a former rector of the church. The old rectory building on Church Lane was also worked on by John Carr, it is named High Trees and is Grade II listed, as are a number of other 18th and early 19th century buildings along the main road (Worksop Road) including The Grange and South Farm. To the north of these on Aughton Lane is the William Layne Reading Room, a building that was formally Aston Old School, founded in 1738, next to which stands a war memorial erected in 2011.

== Education ==
Aston Academy is the local high school, specialising in mathematics and computing. Most pupils come from the Aston-cum-Aughton area, with others from nearby villages such as Beighton, Woodhouse and Treeton.

Local primary schools are:

- Aston C of E (Church of England)
- Aston Hall Primary
- Aston Lodge Primary
- Aston Springwood Junior & Infant School
- Swallownest Primary
- Aughton Primary
- Aston Fence Junior & Infant

== See also ==
- Listed buildings in Aston cum Aughton
