= Aston cum Aughton =

Civil parish in South Yorkshire, England

Coordinates: 53.36°N 1.32°W

Aston cum Aughton is a civil parish in the Metropolitan Borough of Rotherham in South Yorkshire, England, with a population of 13,961 according to the 2001 census.

It consists of the villages of Aston and Aughton, along with Swallownest. To the west the parish borders the unparished area of Sheffield. Buildings of interest include the Aston Manor house, the original West family house in Aughton, the historically significant Aston Reading Room, several early farm cottages boasting magnificent period features and a beautiful 12th-century church.

== History ==
The villages of Aston and Aughton were recorded in the Domesday Book as "Estone" and "Hactone", and were at that time already well established, with a total combined value of £1 sterling. Swallownest is a much later settlement existing as a separate entity since the 1740s. Nathaniel Swallow, a farmer after whom the village is presumably named, was an early resident. Swallow's house, still intact - although in desperate need of repair, was left standing until 2006, when the land was bought by developers and transformed into a small housing estate - much to the displeasure of some locals.

The approximate population of Aston cum Aughton (which includes Swallownest) currently stands at around 15,000. The parish has twice expanded rapidly. The coal mines brought an influx of workers during the late 19th and early 20th centuries. The recent new housing estates have, once again, increased the population. Links to Rotherham and Sheffield are good and regular bus services - although seemingly reduced - still enable access.

== Schools ==
There are 7 feeder Primary Schools to Aston Academy, which, with almost 2000 pupils is the fourth largest 11-18 school in the country.

== Churches ==
There are five churches in Aston cum Aughton, incorporating many different service styles. The earliest parts of the parish church date from the 12th century. The Parish Church of All Saints has strong links with All Saints Primary and Junior School. The Rector and Curate are regularly involved in the life of the school. All Saints is part of a Team which consists of Holy Trinity Ulley and Christ Church Swallownest. In 1995, the six Methodist Chapels in the parish were united to form Central Methodist Church, which now has a thriving children's ministry and an attendance of roughly 150 at regular services. Bethesda Church was established in 1934 and belongs to the Assemblies of God, a Pentecostal umbrella group. This church aims to meet the needs of the community through groups such as the Youth and children's clubs. Swallownest Baptist church has remained in the same building since 1908, when the fellowship was established. The Catholic congregation in Swallownest now meets in a building belonging to the Anglican church.

== See also ==
- Listed buildings in Aston cum Aughton
