= William Doughty (painter) =

English painter and engraver

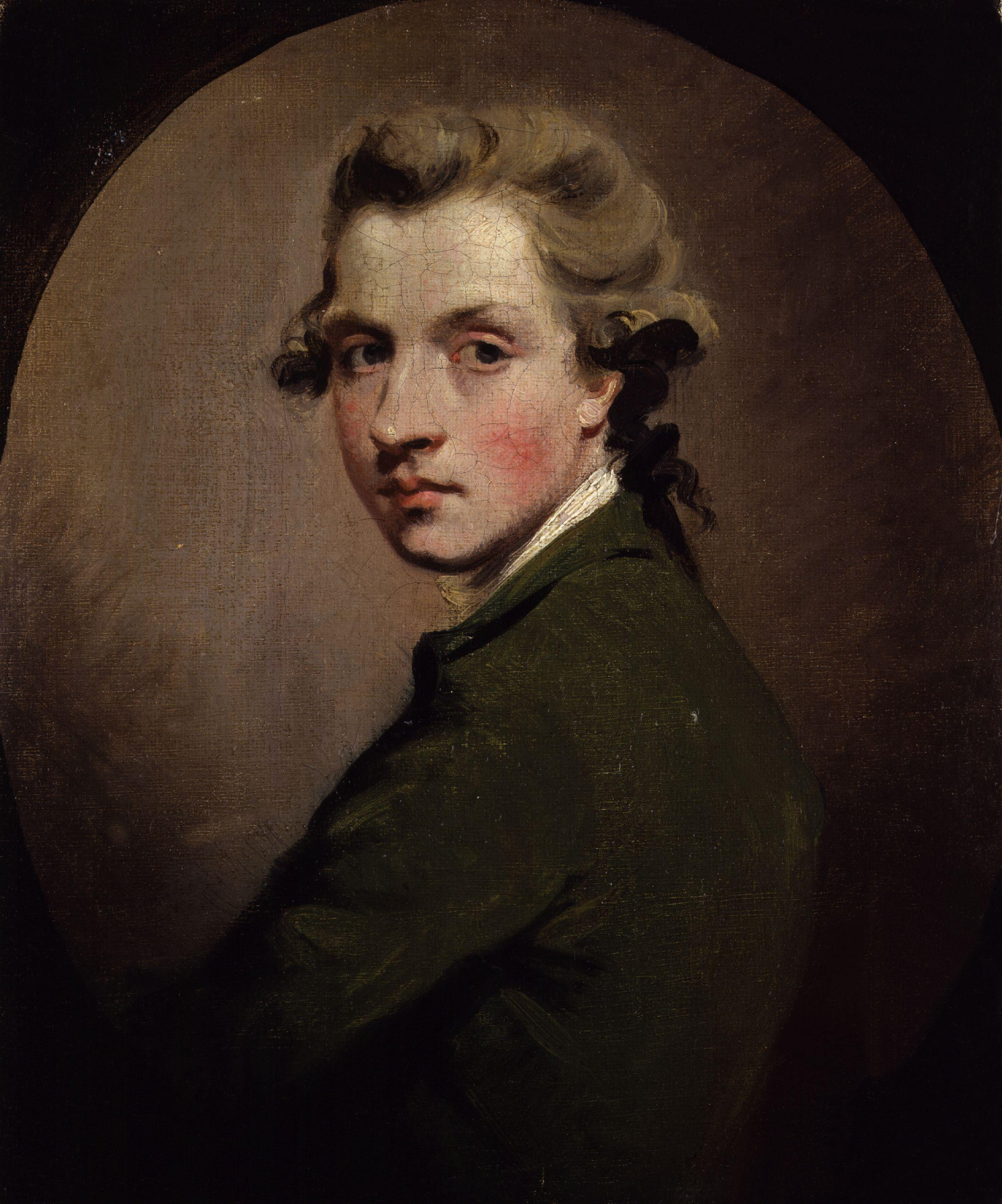
- Self portrait
- Born: 1757; York, England, Great Britain
- Died: 1782 (aged 24–25); Lisbon, Portugal

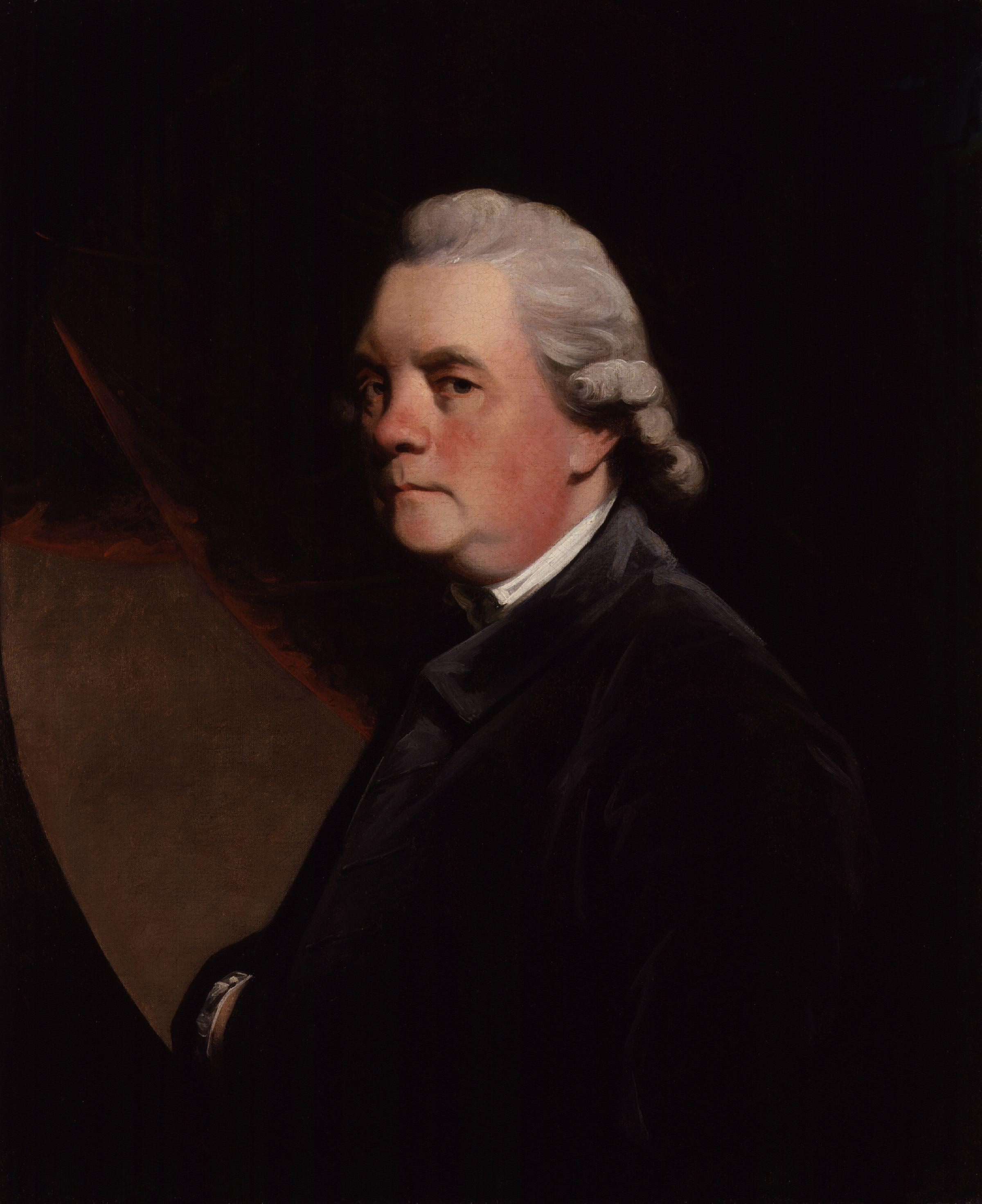
William Mason, now in the National Portrait Gallery

William Doughty (1757–1782), a painter and engraver, was born in York in 1757. In 1776, he became a pupil of Sir Joshua Reynolds, and after an unsuccessful attempt as a portrait painter in Ireland, he in 1779 settled down in London; but in the following year he set sail for Bengal, having just married a servant girl, from Reynolds's house. His ship, however, was captured by the French and Spanish, by whom he was brought to Lisbon, where he died in 1782. Two paintings which he exhibited were a 'Circe' and a portrait of Sir Joshua Reynolds; but he was more successful with his etchings and mezzotint portraits, among which are the following:

- Thomas Beckwith, the Antiquary of York.
- Thomas Gray, the Poet.
- Admiral Keppel; after Sir Joshua Reynolds.
- William Mason, the Poet; after the same.
- Mary Palmer, the niece of Sir Joshua Reynolds, afterwards Marchioness of Thomond; after the same.
- Dr. Samuel Johnson; after the same.
