= William Mason (poet) =

18th-century English poet, divine, draughtsman, author, editor, and gardener

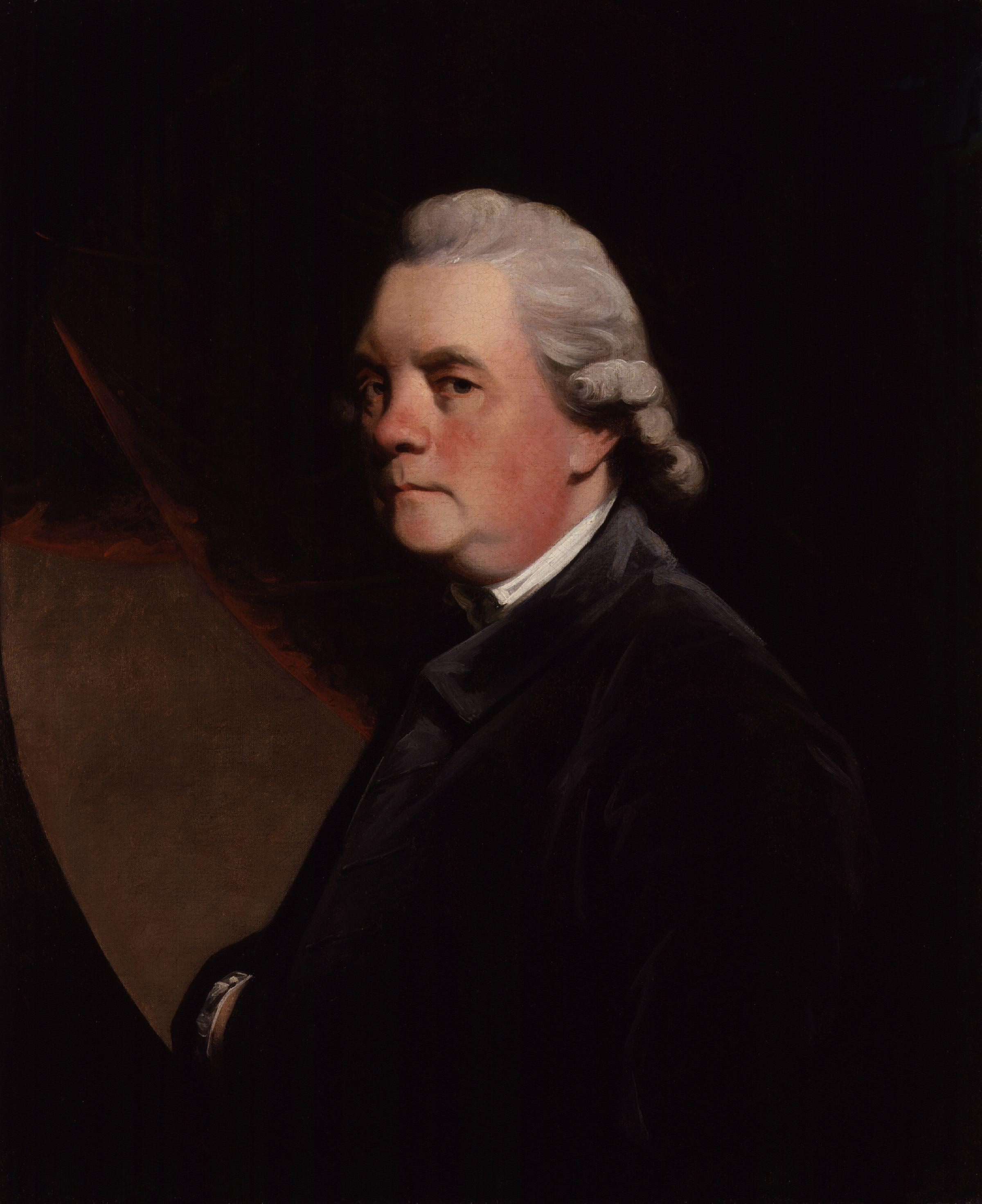
- William Mason by William Doughty (oil on canvas, 1778)
- Born: 12 February 1724; Kingston upon Hull, East Riding of Yorkshire, England
- Died: 7 April 1797 (aged 73); Aston, East Riding of Yorkshire, England
- Occupations: English poet, editor and gardener

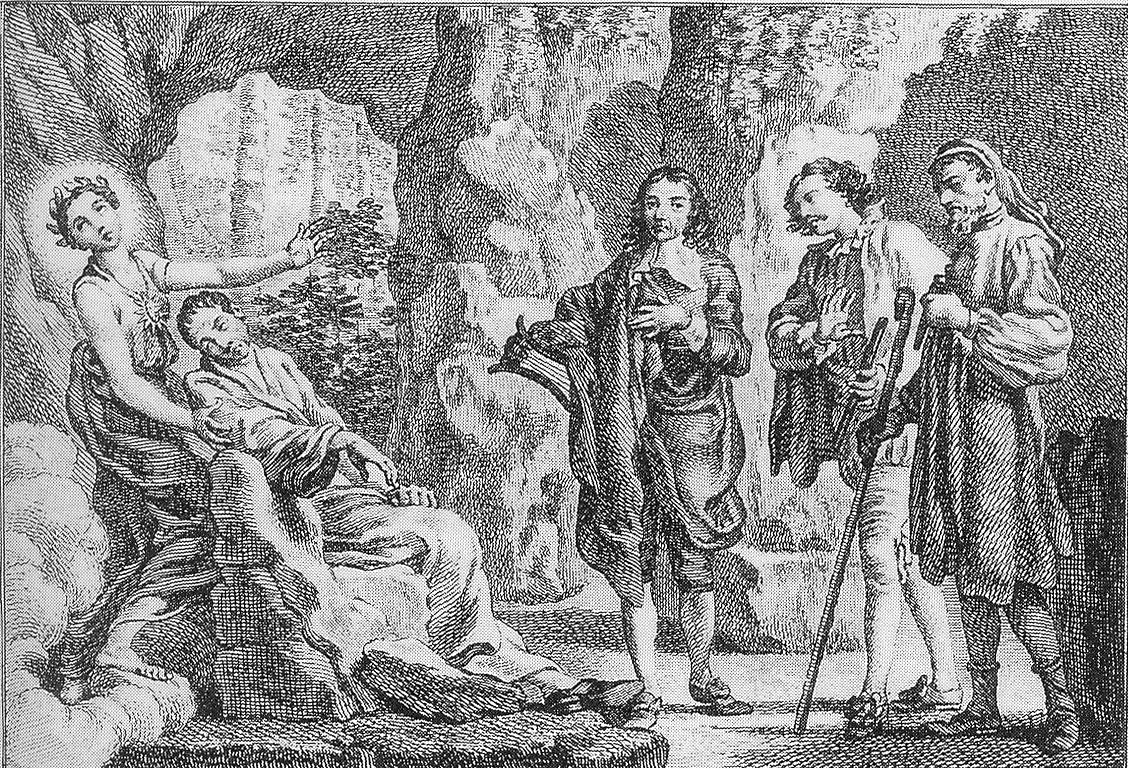
The death of Alexander Pope from Museus, a threnody by Mason, published in 1747

William Mason (12 February 1724 – 7 April 1797) was an English poet, divine, amateur draughtsman, author, editor and gardener.

== Life ==
He was born in Hull and educated at Hull Grammar School and St John's College, Cambridge. He was ordained in 1754 and held a number of posts in the church.

In 1747, his poem "Musaeus, a Monody on the Death of Mr. Pope" was published to acclaim and quickly went through several editions. Summarizing this poem, a threnody, William Lyon Phelps writes:

Musaeus was a monody on the death of Pope, and written in imitation of Milton's Lycidas. Different poets in Musaeus bewail Pope's death; Chaucer speaks in an imitation of old English, and Spenser speaks two stanzas after the metre of the Shepherd's Calendar and three stanzas in the style of the Fairy Queen. There is nothing remarkable about these imitations....

Among his other works are the historical tragedies Elfrida (1752) and Caractacus (1759) (both used in translation as libretti for 18th century operas: Elfrida - Paisiello and LeMoyne, Caractacus - Sacchini (as Arvire et Évélina) and a long poem on gardening, The English Garden (three volumes, 1772–82). His garden designs included one for the Viscount Harcourt.

He entered the Church in 1754, and in 1762 became the precentor and canon of York Minster.

He was the friend, executor, and biographer of Thomas Gray, who was a great influence on his own work. In 1775 The Poems of Mr. Gray. To which are prefixed Memoirs of his Life and Writings by W[illiam]. Mason. York, was published. James Boswell said that in his Life of Samuel Johnson (1791) he "resolved to adopt and enlarge upon the excellent plan of Mr Mason, in his Memoirs of Gray." Mason was also a friend of Horace Walpole and Joshua Reynolds.

Mason's artwork was considered worthy of showing at the Royal Academy between 1782 and 1786. In 1785, he was William Pitt the Younger's choice to succeed William Whitehead as Poet Laureate but refused the honour.

Two of his works of scenes at the York racecourse, "A Country Racecourse with horses preparing to start" and "A Country Racecourse with horses running". were reproduced as mezzotint illustrations in 1786 by Francis Jukes in collaboration with Robert Pollard.

Memorial inscriptions for Mason may be found in the church at Aston near Rotherham where he was rector and at Poet's Corner in Westminster Abbey. A cenotaph was also erected by Countess Harcourt in the gardens at Nuneham Courtenay.

He was the guardian of Francis Ferrand Foljambe during his minority.

== Gallery: The English Garden ==
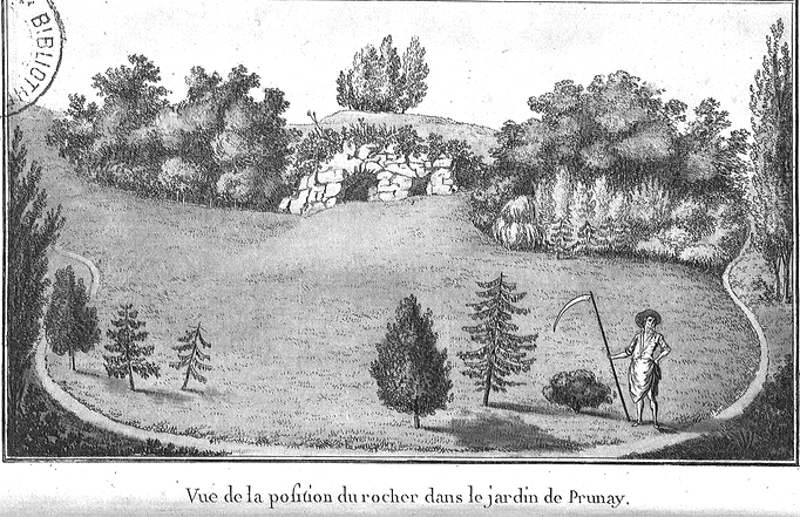

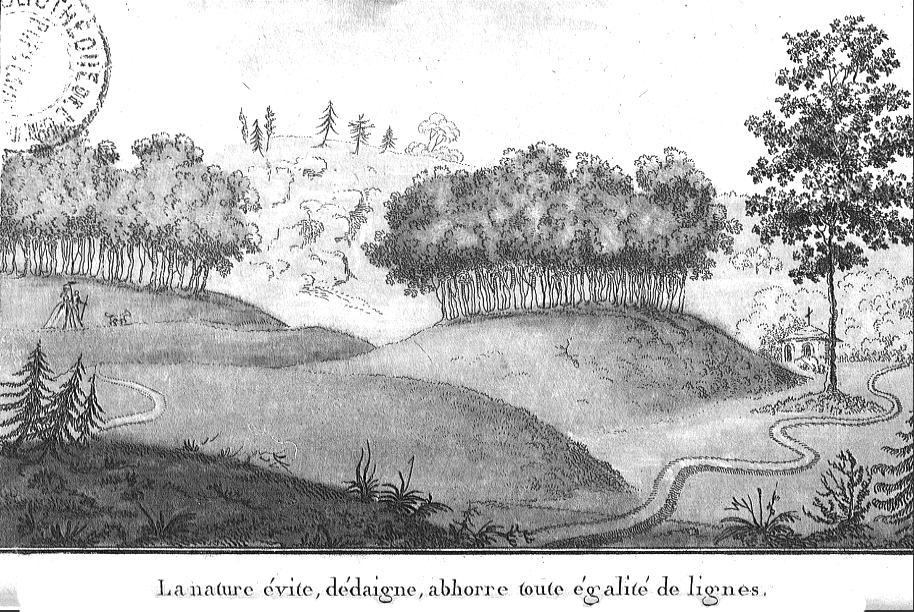

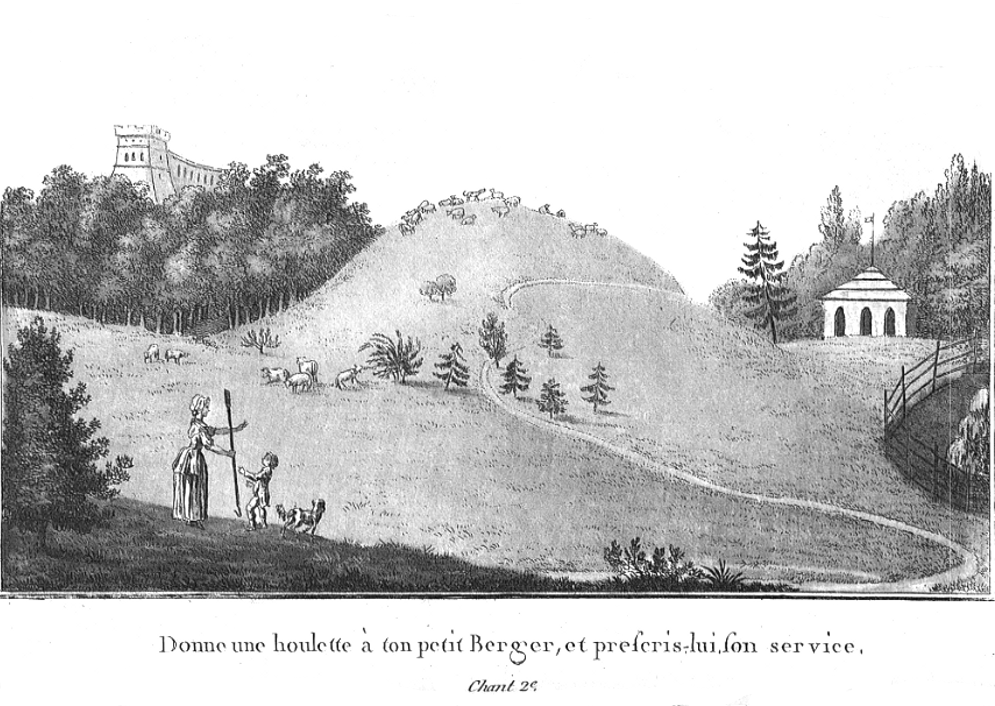

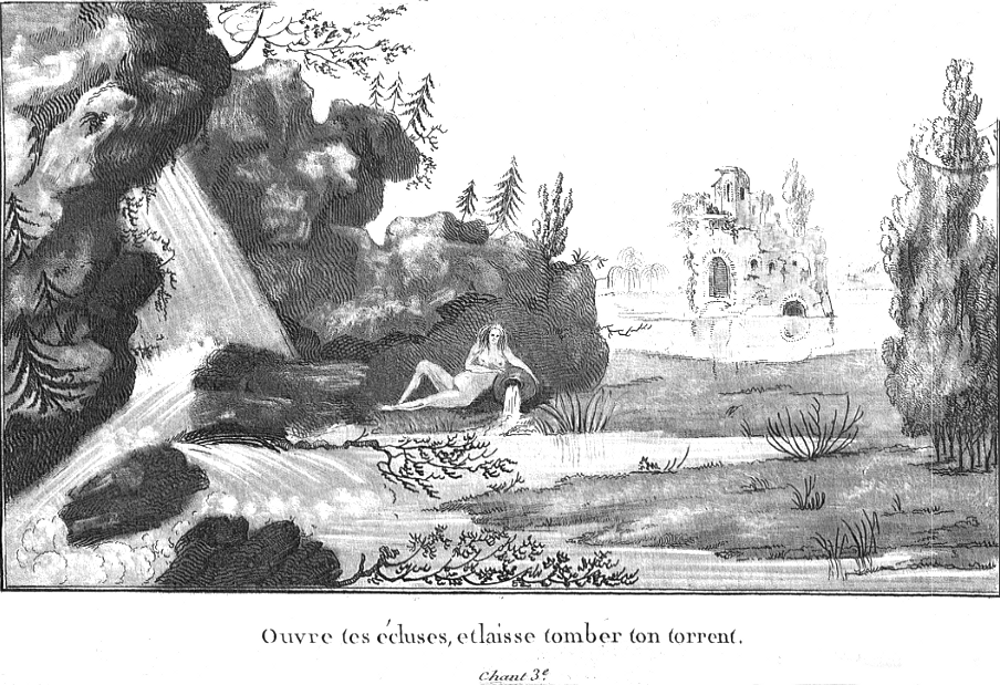

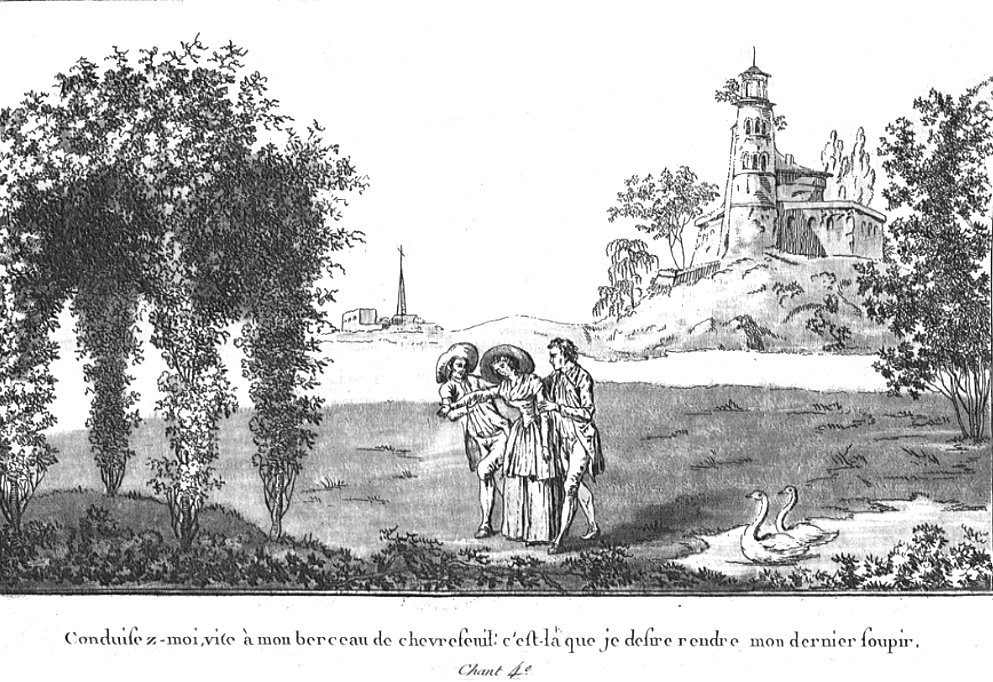

== See also ==
- Poets' Corner

== Sources ==
- Author and Bookinfo.com
- Translation into French of The English Garden with five drawings.
- William Mason at the Dictionary of National Biography, 1885-1900
