= English Churchman =

Protestant family newspaper published in England

English Churchman and St James's Chronicle
- Type: Fortnightly newspaper
- Format: Tabloid
- Owner: English Churchman Trust
- Editor: Rev Christopher Pierce
- Founded: 7 February 1761; 265 years ago
- Political alignment: Church of England / Anglican Communion
- Language: English
- Headquarters: 8 Cradlehall Gardens, Cradlehall Inverness, Scotland
- Website: www.englishchurchman.com

The English Churchman was a Protestant family newspaper published in England with a global readership. The newspaper was not an official organ of the Church of England, but was one of only three officially recognised church papers, alongside the Church Times and the Church of England Newspaper. The formal title of the newspaper is English Churchman and St James's Chronicle.

The St James's Chronicle dates from 1761. The first edition of a newspaper under the name English Churchman was published on 5 January 1843.

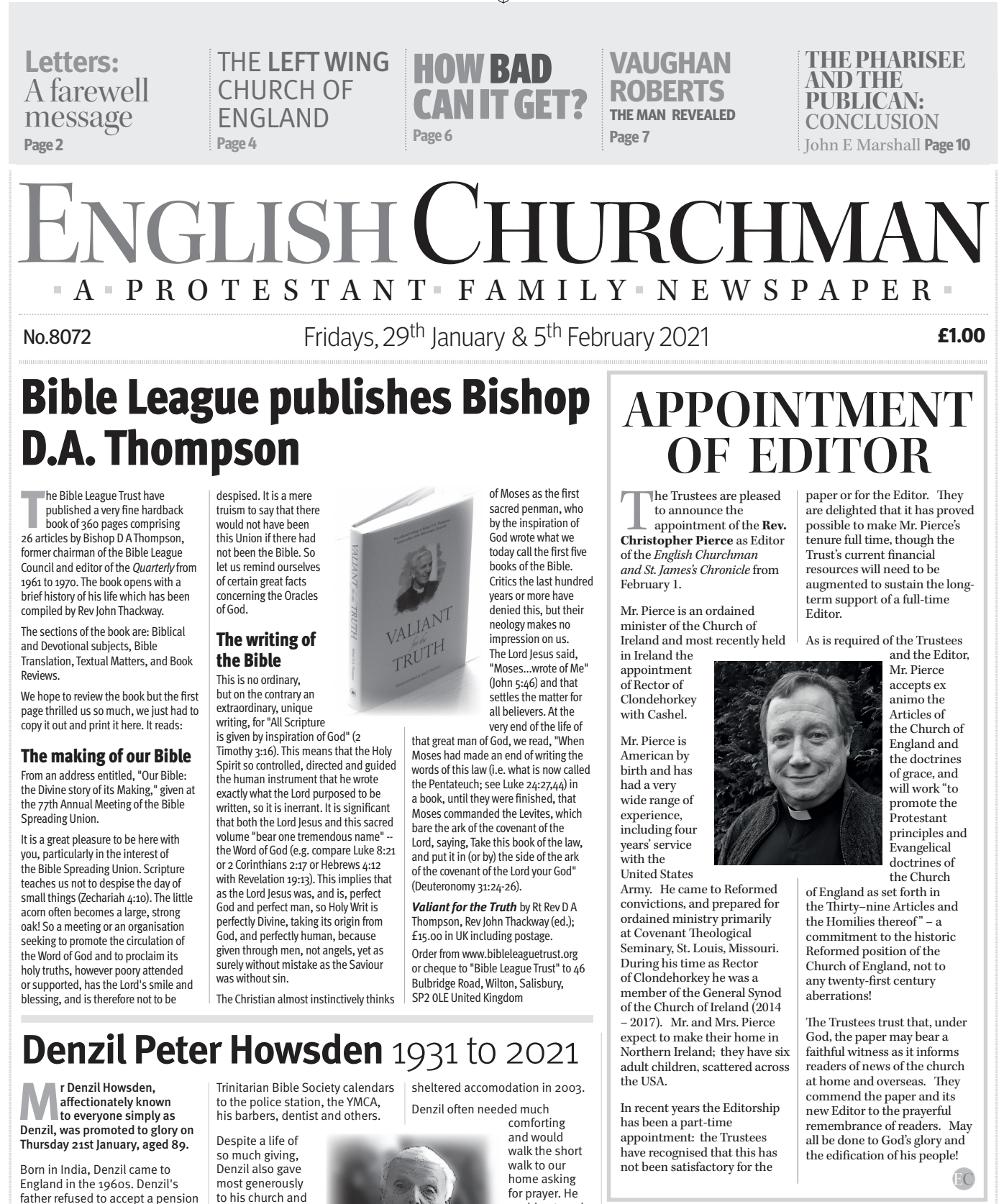
English Churchman 8072, 29 January 2021

Contrary to general ecclesiastical trends, the English Churchman began life as an Anglo-Catholic newspaper. It was 'set up for the express purpose of advocating Tractarian views' and ranked alongside the British Critic as one of the 'two great Tractarian organs'.

In 1884, the paper was acquired by those in sympathy with the Church Association, thus coming into evangelical hands, where it has remained ever since. It has gained a reputation for being 'robustly Reformed and Protestant, Evangelical, as the Formularies of the Church of England teach' (i.e. the Thirty-Nine Articles, the Book of Common Prayer, and the ordinal).

Rev. Harold Gordon Haynes Hill (1970 to 1995) – obituary in EC.

Rev. Harold Gordon Haynes Hill (1970 to 1995) – obituary in EC.

Dr Napier Malcolm (Some years until August 2002)

In August 2002 the Editor, Dr Napier Malcolm, resigned and started The British Church Newspaper with the help of his existing team of helpers. The English Churchman was then virtually restarted from scratch under the editorship of Andrew Price. From 2005 until January 2021, Rev Peter Ratcliff of the Church of England Continuing was editor. The newspaper continued along the lines of Dr Malcolm during this period, distinctly opposed to remaining in the Anglican Communion. The newspaper took a clear Reformed line and ceased advocating Christian Zionism.

As of 1 February 2021, the editor was Rev Christopher Pierce, a clergyman of the Church of Ireland.

The cover cost of English Churchman rose from one penny per copy in the late nineteenth century to one pound at closure. The newspaper was originally weekly, but since the 1970s began publishing fortnightly. Most readers were subscribers who receive the newspaper by post, although the paper was historically available through newsagents.

After 262 years the newspaper ceased publication and closed on the 27th of June 2023.
