= Listed buildings in Dronfield =

Dronfield is a civil parish in the North East Derbyshire district of Derbyshire, England. The parish contains 44 listed buildings that are recorded in the National Heritage List for England. Of these, one is listed at Grade I, the highest of the three grades, four are at Grade II*, the middle grade, and the others are at Grade II, the lowest grade. The parish contains the town of Dronfield, the district of Dronfield Woodhouse, the village of Coal Aston, and the surrounding area. Most of the listed buildings are houses, cottages and associated structures, farmhouses and farm buildings. The other listed buildings include churches, a churchyard cross, public houses, a former school, a milestone, a monument, and a bridge.

== Key ==
Grade	Criteria
I	Buildings of exceptional interest, sometimes considered to be internationally important
II*	Particularly important buildings of more than special interest
II	Buildings of national importance and special interest

== Buildings ==
Name and location	Photograph	Date	Notes	Grade
St John the Baptist's Church; 53.30158°N 1.47198°W		Early 13th century	The church has been altered and extended during the centuries, particularly following storm damage in 1816. It is built in sandstone with roofs of slate and lead, and consists of a nave with a clerestory, north and south aisles, a south porch, a larger and wider chancel, a north vestry, and a west steeple. The steeple has a tower with four stages, gabled diagonal buttresses rising to crocketed corner pinnacles, moulded string courses, a west doorway with a moulded pointed arch and a hood mould, bell openings with pointed arches containing clock faces, an embattled parapet, and a recessed spire with two tiers of lucarnes. The vestry has two storeys and an octagonal west stair turret, and the east window has seven lights.	I
Churchyard cross 53.30139°N 1.47181°W		Medieval	The cross is in the churchyard of St John the Baptist's Church. It has an octagonal base of three steps, on which is a block, and a square base with chamfered corners, an octagonal upper face, and gabled sides. On this is the stump of an octagonal shaft, with a sundial on the top face.	II
Aston End; 53.31038°N 1.46057°W	—	Early 15th century (possible)	A medieval hall and cross-wing house that has been altered and extended. It is in sandstone with quoins and a stone slate roof. There are two storeys and an L-shaped plan, with a hall range of three bays and a two-bay cross-wing. The doorways have plain surrounds, and the windows are casements, some of them mullioned. Inside the house are full-height cruck trusses, and the remains of close studded partitions.	II*
Dronfield Woodhouse Hall farmhouse and walls 53.30283°N 1.50597°W	—	Late 16th century	The house, which has been extensively altered, is in sandstone on a plinth, and has a stone slate roof with coped gables and moulded kneelers. There are two storeys and attics, and a modified hall and cross-wings plan, with unequal wings. On the front are two doorways, one with a quoined surround and a massive lintel, and the other in an offshut. Most of the windows are mullioned. The walls enclosing the rear garden have an outer skin of sandstone and an inner one of brick, and they contain two doorways. Inside the house is a single cruck truss.	II*
Former cruck barn, Gosforth Farm; 53.30514°N 1.49228°W	—	Late 16th century	The barn was converted into living accommodation in 1983–84. It is in sandstone on a plinth, with quoins and a stone slate roof. There are two storeys and three bays. In the centre is a full-height opening with a quoined surround, now glazed, and the other openings have been inserted. Inside the house are two full cruck trusses, and the remnants of a third.	II
Upper Birchitt Farmhouse; 53.31304°N 1.50232°W	—	Late 16th century	The farmhouse, which was extended by the addition of a wing in the 17th century, is in sandstone on a plinth, with quoins, and a stone slate roof with coped gables and moulded kneelers. There is an L-shaped plan, with two ranges at right angles, and a doorway with a quoined surround and a substantial lintel in the angle. The older range has two storeys and three bays, and contains mullioned and later casement windows, and a stable door. The later range has two storeys and an attic, and three bays. The windows have mullions or transoms, or both, some with hood moulds.	II
The Blue Stoops Inn; 53.30211°N 1.47481°W		1596	The public house, which has been altered over the years, is in stone with Welsh slate roofs. There are two storeys and four bays, with gables over the outer bays. The doorway has a plain surround, and the windows are sashes.	II
Quoit Green House; 53.29816°N 1.46672°W	—	1613	The house incorporates elements of an earlier building, and has been altered and extended. It is in sandstone with quoins, and has roofs of tile and Welsh slate. There are two storeys and attics, and an L-shaped plan, with two ranges at right angles. On the north front is a doorway and a bow window, and the other windows vary; some are mullioned, some are sashes, and some are casements. In a gable apex is a datestone.	II
7, 7A, 7B, 8, 10 and 12 Church Street; 53.30121°N 1.47152°W	—	Early 17th century	A farm outbuilding, later altered and extended, including the addition of a house at the east end, and used for other purposes. The building is in sandstone and has a roof of Welsh slate and stone slate. The outbuilding has a single storey and four bays, and contains shop fronts and small windows. The house has three storeys and two bays, coped gables and moulded kneelers. In the ground floor is a shop front and a doorway, and the other floors contains sash windows. Inside the outbuilding are five cruck trusses.	II
Silkstone Farmhouse; 53.31100°N 1.45732°W	—	Early 17th century	The farmhouse is in sandstone with quoins, stone slate eaves, and a roof of Welsh slate with coped gables and moulded kneelers. There are two storeys and three bays. The doorway has a chamfered quoined surround and lintel, and the windows are mullioned. On the west side is an exposed cruck truss.	II
The Cottage; 53.30238°N 1.47511°W	—	Early 17th century	The house is in sandstone with quoins, and a stone slate roof with coped gables and moulded kneelers. There are two storeys and attics, an L-shaped plan, and a front of three bays. The central doorway has a moulded surround, a moulded keystone, and a hood mould, and is flanked by canted bay windows with hipped roofs. In the upper floor are sash windows, and there is a central gabled dormer. Some of the windows at the rear and sides are mullioned.	II
Locker Room, Hallowes Golf Clubhouse; 53.29289°N 1.46123°W	—	1638	The locker room has been converted from farm outbuildings. It is in sandstone with quoins and a stone slate roof, hipped on the east. There is a single storey and six bays, and it incorporates elements of an earlier timber framed building.	II
14 and 16 Eckington Road; 53.31138°N 1.46000°W	—	17th century	A pair of sandstone houses with quoins, and a roof of Welsh slate and stone slate, with coped gables and moulded kneelers. There are two storeys and attics, an L-shaped plan, and a front of four bays. The doorway has a quoined surround, and the windows are casements with two lights and mullions. There are continuous hood moulds over the openings in both floors.	II
Chiverton House, walls, gate piers and railings 53.30199°N 1.46863°W	—	17th century	The house is in sandstone, with string courses, and a stone slate roof with coped gables and moulded kneelers. There are two storeys and attics, and six bays, flanked by projecting towers, and with a gable over the middle two bays. The central doorway has a rusticated surround and lintel, and a keystone. Most of the windows are mullioned and transomed, and there are attic dormers. The boundary walls have flat or round copings. Flanking the entrance, and at the ends of the terrace walls, are square piers, each with a moulded cornice, the central piers with an acorn finial and the outer piers with A ball finial. On the front wall are ornamental cast iron railings and double gates.	II*
Outbuildings southwest of Dronfield Woodhouse Hall; 53.30254°N 1.50622°W	—	Mid 17th century	The outbuildings are in sandstone, with quoins, and roofs of Welsh slate and stone slate with coped gables and moulded kneelers. There are two storeys, and a U-shaped plan, with a central range of six bays, and projecting gabled ranges.	II
Gazebo, Hallowes Golf Clubhouse; 53.29270°N 1.46153°W	—	Mid 17th century	The gazebo is in sandstone, with quoins, a moulded eaves cornice, and a pyramidal stone slate roof with a ball finial. On the west side is a flight of four steps to a doorway with a quoined surround and a chamfered lintel. The north wall contains an oculus with a moulded surround, and there is a window in the south wall.	II
Wall behind High Street; 53.30287°N 1.47532°W	—	Mid 17th century	The wall enclosing the gardens behind the properties on the north side of High Street is in sandstone with flat and half-round copings. It contains a doorway with a chamfered quoined surround, a massive lintel, and oversailing flagstones. There are buttresses at intervals, blocked openings, and a doorway with a plain surround.	II
Manor Court; 53.30219°N 1.47728°W	—	Mid 17th century	Houses converted from farm buildings in 1985–86, they are in sandstone with quoins, and roofs of Welsh slate and stone slate with coped gables and moulded kneelers. There are two storeys, and they consist of a five-bay range with a two-bay offshut, and a two-bay range at the north end. The main range contains a segmental arch, now glazed, and casement windows. In the north range are two doorways with quoined surrounds and massive lintels, and small single-light windows.	II
Rookery Cottage; 53.30245°N 1.47595°W	—	Mid 17th century	A sandstone house with quoins, and a roof with coped gables and moulded kneelers. There are two storeys and three bays. On the front is a porch and an inserted doorway, and the windows are mullioned. At the southwest corner are the remains of a massive quoined doorway.	II
Rose Hill and walls 53.30184°N 1.46778°W	—	Mid 17th century	A sandstone house with quoins, and a stone slate roof with coped gables and moulded kneelers. There is an asymmetrical plan, with a three-bay central range, rear gabled wings, later infill between them, and further additions. The south front has three storeys and four bays, and a parapet linking the outer gables. The doorway has a quoined surround, a substantial lintel, and a semicircular pediment, and the windows are mullioned, with some mullions removed. The boundary walls are coped, and contain square gate piers, each with a moulded cornice and a ball finial.	II
The Green Dragon Inn; 53.30159°N 1.47297°W		17th century	The public house is in rendered sandstone with a Welsh slate roof. There are two storeys and attics, and an L-shaped plan, with two two-bay ranges at right angles. In the main range is a doorway with a moulded surround and mullioned windows. The advancing range contains sash windows, one in the upper floor with a semicircular head.	II
The Manor Hotel; 53.30216°N 1.47421°W		Mid 17th century	Originally two houses, the main block was added in the 18th century. The building is in sandstone with roofs of Welsh slate and stone slate, and one coped gable with a pyramidal finial. The main block has three storeys and three bays. In the ground floor are three doorways, two coupled and converted into windows, all with a moulded surround, a pulvinated frieze, and a shallow cornice. The windows were added in the 20th-century, and there is a continuous hood mould over the ground floor openings. The 17th-century to the right has two storeys and a hipped roof.	II
The Old Grammar School; 53.30170°N 1.47386°W	—	17th century or earlier	The former school is in sandstone with a stone slate roof. There are two storeys, four bays, and a single-storey range at the rear. The doorway has a plain surround, and the windows are sashes.	II
Hallowes Golf Clubhouse; 53.29293°N 1.46168°W		1657	A house, later a golf clubhouse, in sandstone, with string courses, and a roof with coped gables and moulded kneelers. There are three storeys, and an H-shaped plan with a hall and cross-wings. On the front are six bays and three gables, the outer gables projecting. The central doorway has a moulded surround and a hood mould, and above it is a curved hood under which is an initial and the date. The windows are mullioned, in the middle gable is a clock face, and the outer gables each contains an oculus with four keystones. In the attic of the east cross-wing are two upper cruck trusses.	II
Pair of cottages, Nether Birchitt; 53.31055°N 1.47668°W	—	Late 17th century	A house, later two cottages, in sandstone, with quoins, and a Welsh slate roof with coped gables and moulded kneelers. There are two storeys, three bays, a two-storey extension to the east, and a single-storey extension to the west. The doorway has a moulded surround and a keystone integral with the lintel. The windows are mullioned with hood moulds, and at the rear is a tall staircase window.	II
Building northeast of The Hall; 53.30278°N 1.47449°W	—	Late 17th century	A former farm outbuilding containing the remains of an earlier timber framed building. It is in sandstone, and has a stone slate roof with coped gables and moulded kneelers. There is an L-shaped plan, and it contains a former threshing door under a segmental relieving arch, slit vents at two levels, two doorways with quoined surround, and a loft door above.	II*
Vale House; 53.30131°N 1.47052°W	—	Late 17th century	The house, which was later extended, is in sandstone, partly rendered, with a sill band, and a tile roof with coped gables and moulded kneelers. There is an irregular plan, with an earlier range of six bays and a flat-roofed bay to the east, beyond which is a 19th-century two-bay extension with a lean-to at the end. The original range has two storeys and attics, and there is a gable over the right two bays. The windows are mullioned, the original range has two dormers, and in the later extension is a doorway with a Tudor arched head.	II
Outbuilding southeast of Chiverton House; 53.30184°N 1.46841°W	—	c. 1712	Originally stables and a brewhouse, the building is in sandstone with quoins and a stone slate roof. There is a single storey with overlofts, and three bays. The central doorway is arched with a quoined surround, and the windows are also arched and have louvres.	II
Outbuildings south of Chiverton House; 53.30174°N 1.46875°W	—	c. 1712	The buildings are in sandstone with quoins, and a stone slate roof with coped gables and moulded kneelers at the south, and pyramidal at the north. There is a single storey with attics at the south end, and four bays, the north bay square with double doors. In the middle of the other bays are double doors with a quoined surround.	II
The Red House; 53.30194°N 1.47354°W	—	1731	A red brick house with sandstone dressings, quoins, and a tile roof with coped gables and moulded kneelers. There are two storeys and cellars, and a symmetrical front of five bays. Steps with railings lead up to the central doorway that has a moulded architrave and a shallow cornice, and above it and linked by pilasters is an inscribed plaque. The windows are two-light sashes, and the front area is enclosed by iron railings.	II
Library; 53.30206°N 1.47623°W		Early 18th century (probable)	Originally the Manor House, later used as a library and offices, it is in sandstone on a chamfered plinth, with a moulded string course, a moulded eaves cornice, and a hipped slate roof. There are two storeys and a basement, and seven bays. The middle bay projects and contains a porch that has a semicircular-headed doorway with a moulded surround, pilasters, an entablature, impost blocks, and a keystone. The windows on the front are sashes, and at the rear are mullioned and transomed windows.	II
The Hall; 53.30241°N 1.47484°W	—	Early 18th century	A sandstone house with rusticated quoins, floor bands, a moulded cornice, an open parapet with square balusters, and a Welsh slate roof. There are two storeys and attics, a symmetrical front of five bays, and a lower two-storey range to the east. The central doorway has a moulded surround and a segmental pediment, and the windows are mullioned and transomed. The east range contains a doorway with a massive surround.	II
The Old Vicarage; 53.30210°N 1.47358°W	—	Early 18th century	The house is in red brick with stone dressings, quoins, an eaves cornice, a parapet cornice, and a Welsh slate roof with coped gables and moulded kneelers. There are two storeys and a symmetrical front of five bays. The outer bays contain two-storey canted bay windows. Steps lead to the central doorway with a moulded architrave and a shallow cornice, and the windows are sashes with keystones.	II
Norwood Farmhouse; 53.31188°N 1.45951°W	—	Mid 18th century	The farmhouse is in sandstone with quoins and a stone slate roof. There are two storeys and three bays. The doorway has a quoined surround and a massive lintel, and the windows are casements.	II
Two farm buildings east of Norwood Farmhouse; 53.31190°N 1.45927°W	—	Mid 18th century	The farm outbuildings are in sandstone with quoins and stone slate roofs. There are two storeys and four bays, the west bay taller with coped gables and moulded kneelers. The buildings contain mullioned windows, and doorways, one with a quoined surround.	II
Outbuildings east of Silkstone Farmhouse; 53.31106°N 1.45708°W	—	Late 18th century	The outbuildings are in sandstone with roofs of Welsh slate and stone slate, and there are coped gables on the east range. There are two ranges at right angles, each with a single storey and overlofts, and two bays. The south range contains doorways with massive jambs and deep lintels. In the east range is a central stable doorway with a segmental arch, and both ranges have feeding troughs.	II
Milestone; 53.31244°N 1.50780°W		Late 18th to early 19th century	The milestone is on the east side of Rod Moor Road. It consists of an upright rectangular stone with rounded corners. Painted on the stone are two semicircular panels, one containing the distance to Gleadless, and the other to Calver.	II
Premises occupied by the Slinn Computer Group (The Grange); 53.30178°N 1.47336°W	—	1806	A sandstone house with bracketed eaves and a Welsh slate roof. There are three storeys and three bays, and to the west is a lower two-storey two-bay range. In the centre is a round-headed doorway with a traceried fanlight. On the front, the windows are sashes, and at the rear they are a mix of sashes and casements. The middle window in the top floor has a semicircular head, and bears the inscription 'A JOSEPHO TAYLOR EXTRUCTA AD 1804 '.	II
The Manse; 53.30092°N 1.47077°W	—	1812 (probable)	The house is in sandstone on a shallow plinth, with quoins and a hipped tile roof. There are two storeys and three bays. The central doorway has a Classical surround, a semicircular fanlight, and a broken pediment, and the windows have top-hung lights.	II
Gate piers east of the premises occupied by the Slinn Computer Group; 53.30180°N 1.47316°W	—	Early 19th century	There are two pairs of square rusticated gate piers in sandstone. Between each outer pair are arches with voussoirs and flat coping, and the west pair are linked to the building by a wall.	II
The Monument; 53.30215°N 1.47522°W		1846	The monument was erected to celebrate the repeal of the Corn Laws. It is in gritstone, and has a stepped base and a square plan, and is in Gothic style. It consists of four double-chamfered arches with buttressed corner piers, and quatrefoils in the heads of the arches. On the top is a corbel table with carved animal heads, from which rises a spire with small lucarnes and a cross finial.	II
22–26 High Street; 53.30229°N 1.47539°W		Mid 19th century	A terrace of four houses, some used for other purposes, in sandstone, with quoins, and a roof of Welsh slate and tile. There are two storeys and six bays. The doorways have semicircular arched heads, massive jambs, and heavy lintels. In Nos. 22 and 24 the windows are sashes, and in Nos. 25 and 26 they are casements.	II
Dronfield Methodist Church; 53.30198°N 1.47501°W		1863	The church is in sandstone, and has a Welsh slate roof with coped gables and moulded kneelers. There are two storeys and a basement, and five bays on the sides. The north front has a pediment containing an inscribed plaque, and a band, and there is a central doorway approached by steps with cast iron railings and a handrail. The doorway has a semicircular-arched head and a fanlight, and is flanked by windows with semicircular heads. The windows on the sides have flat heads, and two lights, those in the upper storey with Gothic-arched heads.	II
Lea Road Bridge; 53.30187°N 1.47051°W	—	1870	The bridge was built by the Midland Railway to carry Lea Road over its line and over the River Drone north of the railway station. It is in gritstone with red brick soffit linings, and an L-shaped plan. It consists of two segmental arches over the railway, a cutting and a road, and a further three segmental arches over the river. The arches have voussoirs, and they spring from impost blocks. The string courses and the coped parapets are curved, and end in piers.	II
