= Hundall =

Hamlet in Derbyshire, England

Coordinates: 53.294148°N 1.422790°W

- Location within Derbyshire
- District: North East Derbyshire
- Shire county: Derbyshire
- Region: East Midlands
- Country: England
- Sovereign state: United Kingdom
- Post town: Dronfield
- Postcode district: S18
- Police: Derbyshire
- Fire: Derbyshire
- Ambulance: East Midlands

Hundall is a hamlet in North East Derbyshire in the county of Derbyshire in England.

== Location ==
Hundall is about 3 miles (5 km) north of Chesterfield, just south of the village of Apperknowle, south-west of Marsh Lane, East of Unstone and west of West Handley.

== History ==
Although today the hamlet is little more than a group of large farm houses, the villages in this area were known for Sickle and Scythe manufacturing.
