= Coal Aston Airfield =

Airport in Derbyshire, England

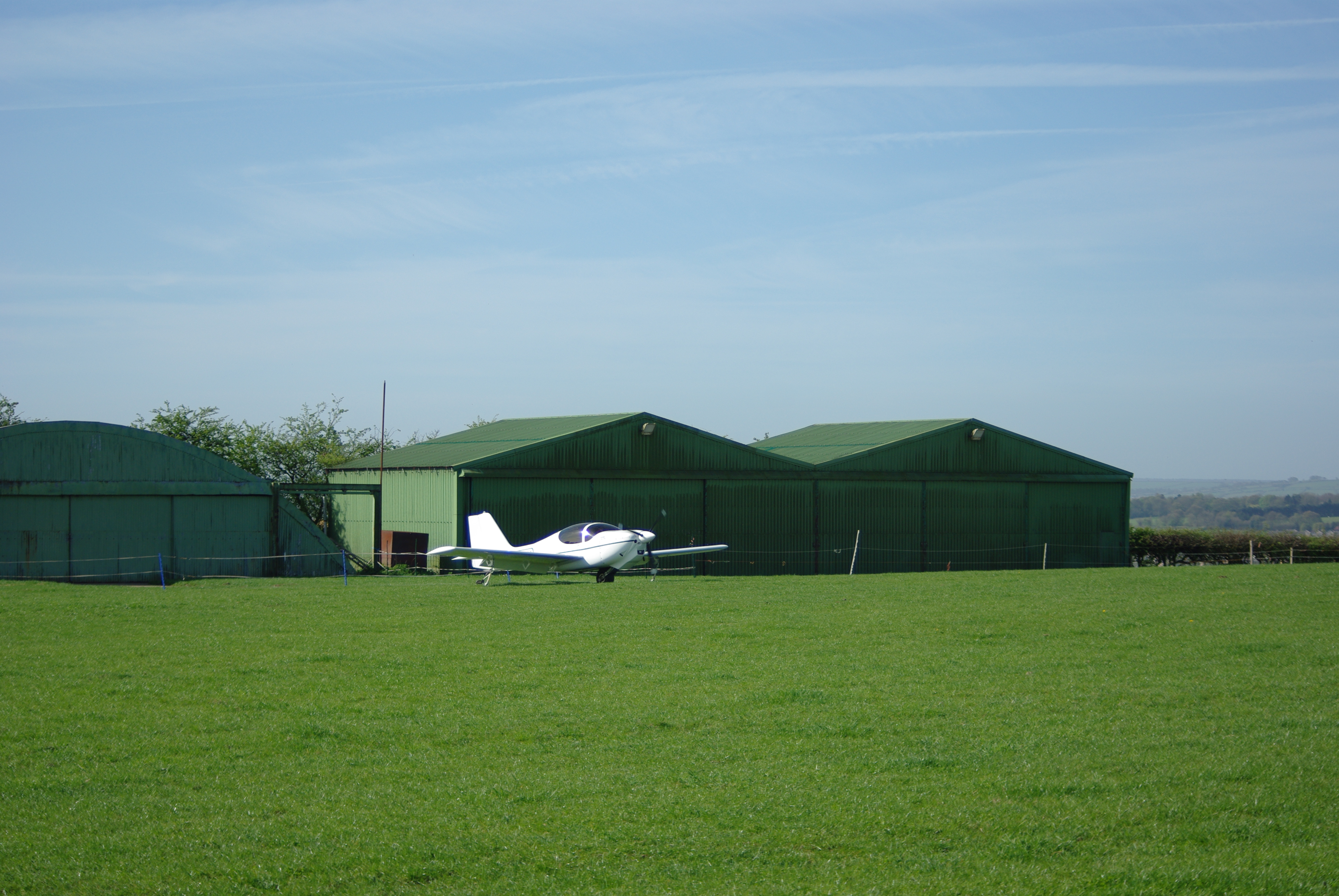
- Hangars at Coal Aston Airfield

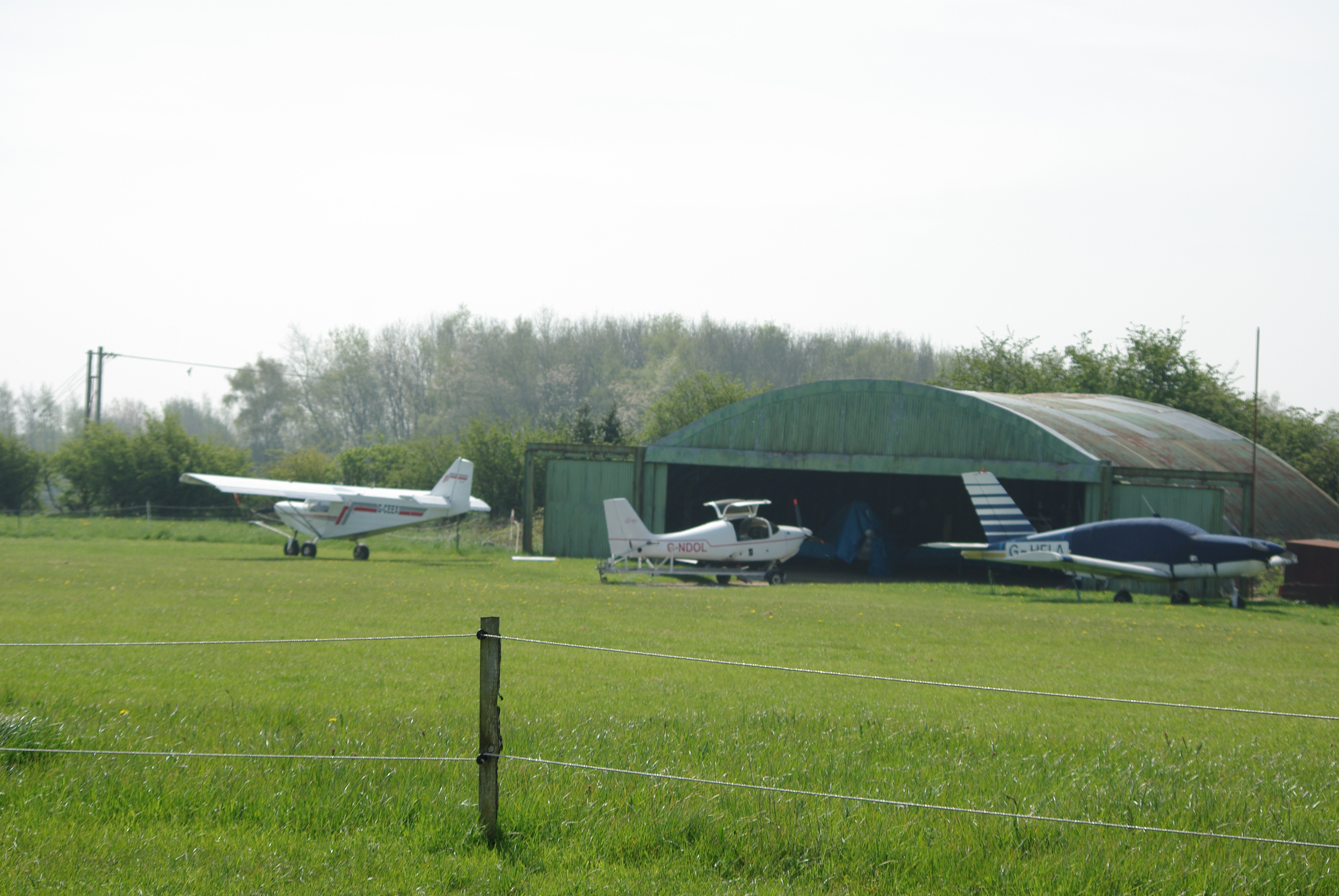
- The blister hangar with residents and visitors, doors open
- IATA: none; ICAO: none

Summary
- Airport type: Private
- Owner/Operator: Richard Valle / Steven Valle
- Elevation AMSL: 720 ft (220 m)
- Coordinates: 53°18′17″N 001°25′50″W

Map
- Location in Derbyshire

Runways
Direction	Length		Surface
Direction	m	ft	Surface
11/29	600	1,969	grass

Coal Aston Airfield also known as Apperknowle Airstrip, is a general aviation airfield located in the village Apperknowle, Derbyshire, 5.8 mi (9.3 km; 5.0 nmi) south of Sheffield.

The unlicensed airfield is just south of a ridge of high ground to the north-east of Dronfield, close to the villages of Summerley, Apperknowle and Coal Aston. There has been a Coal Aston airfield since World War I, though not here; RAF Coal Aston was on what is now the Jordanthorpe estate in south-east Sheffield, 1.7 miles (2.7 km; 1.5 NM) to the north-west. By the late 1920s this had become a civil field which promised, until World War II, to become Sheffield's airport. This earlier location was known as Coal Aston Aerodrome.

The airfield is operated from an on-site farmhouse and prior permission is required for landing. Its single strip grass runway is 660 m long and not entirely flat, with a dip in the middle and a hump at the eastern end. The older hangar at Coal Aston is a Blister-type hangar, a type made familiar during the interwar years. It was erected by United Steel Companies Limited (later British Steel) in 1961. The runway was then at its maximum length of around 800 m; it was reduced to 660 m in 2015. A second hangar was erected in the 1980s next to the blister. In 1995, the airstrip achieved permanent permission for use as an airfield; it is now one of the last remaining traditional grass airfields in Derbyshire.

A public footpath follows the northern and western perimeter of the airfield. There is no public right of way across the site. There is a Border Force office at the airfield.

On 28 May 2017, Europa G-NDOL crashed on Summerley Road, several hundred meters short of the runway in the nearby village of Summerley, while on final approach to Coal Aston Airfield. The pilot, its owner and sole occupant, was killed in the accident.

On 1st September 2024, G-CMGB crashed during a flight from the airfield, killing the pilot.

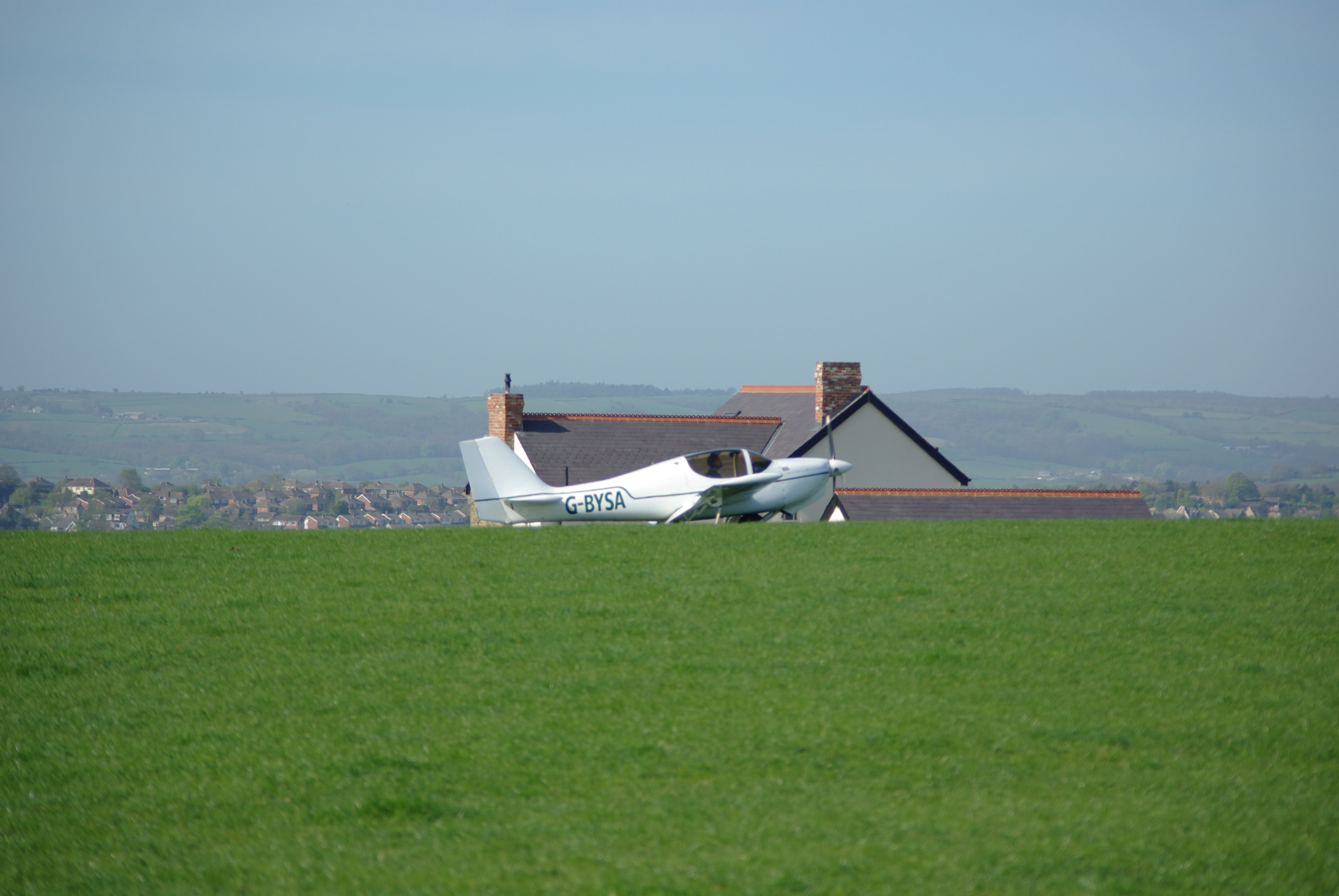
Turning onto runway 11 at Coal Aston Airfield. Farmhouse can be found by following the farm track.

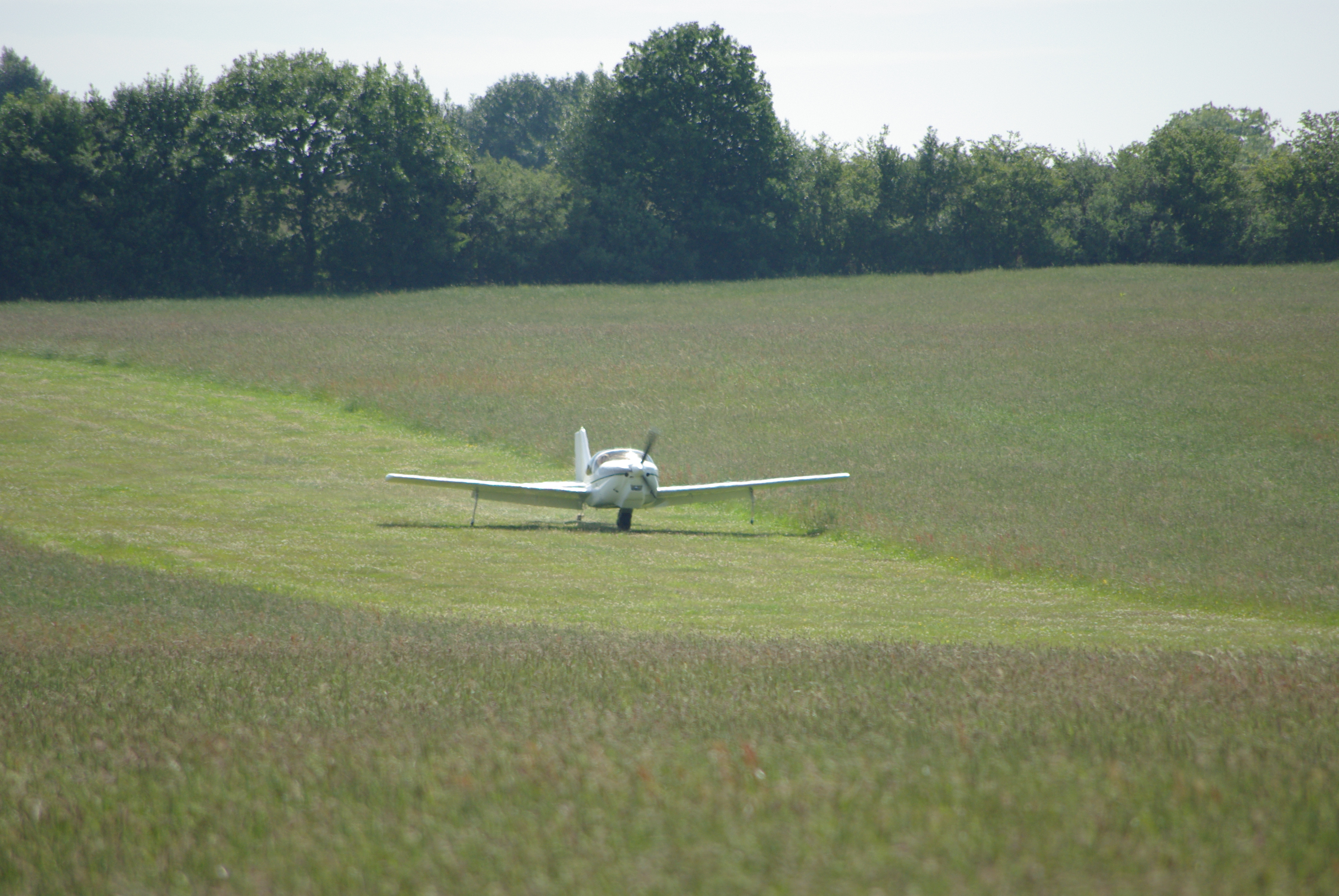
A Europa XS takes off along runway 29
