= Coal Aston Aerodrome =

Former RAF base in Sheffield, England

- RAF Greenhill; RAF Coal Aston
- Greenhill, Sheffield, South Yorkshire in England

Site information
- Operator: RFC 1915–1918; RAF 1918–1921

Location
- Location within South Yorkshire
- Coordinates: 53.328°N 1.466°W
- Grid reference: SK357814
- Area: 206 acres (83 ha) (1917 onwards)

Site history
- Built: 1915–1916
- In use: 1916–1921
- Fate: Converted to housing, retail and educational establishments

Airfield information
- Elevation: 633 feet (193 m) AMSL

Coal Aston Aerodrome was a First World War era airbase operated by the Royal Flying Corps, and then the Royal Air Force, between 1915 and 1921. Originally built as a both a day and night landing ground for the defence of Sheffield, South Yorkshire, (Note: Throughout its operational lifespan, the base was located within the West Riding of Yorkshire. Since 1974, the site has been within the county of South Yorkshire.) the site later became the Northern Aircraft Repair Depot (NARD). The base had several names, but it was most commonly known as Coal Aston.

This earlier aerodrome should not be confused with the Coal Aston Airfield of today. A Certificate of Agreement airfield. This Coal Aston Airfield is also known as Apperknowle Airstrip

== History ==
The base was built in 1915, and even though it was in the Greenhill area of Sheffield, it was always known as Coal Aston. The village of Coal Aston is in Derbyshire, but the base was within South Yorkshire. To confuse matters further, another airfield, at nearby Apperknowle, was also later known as Coal Aston. (Note: The Airfields of Britain Conservation Trust label the first airfield as Coal Aston I (Greenhill) (Sheffield), and Apperknowle as Coal Aston II (Sheffield), even though that location is in Derbyshire.) The base was built in the suburb of Greenhill in 1916 to enable air defence of Sheffield, which was 3 miles (4.8 km) to the north. It was later reformed to become the Northern Aircraft Repair Depot (NARD), and was known as RFC Greenhill, No. 2 NARD, RAF Coal Aston, and finally RAF Greenhill. Although it was in Greenhill, the site was sometimes referred to locally as Norton Aerodrome, causing confusion with nearby RAF Norton (to the east) which was a non-flying station, but had air displays and static aircraft.

The initial landing area was developed in late 1915 as a training base, and the land covered an area of 203 acres (82 ha), measuring 1,800 yards (1,600 m) by 600 yards (550 m). A detachment of No. 33 (HD) Squadron RFC was based at Coal Aston from March to October 1916. The base consisted of five distinct areas; the grassed aircraft area with hangarage, the men's camp to the north across the road, the women's camp across the road from the men's camp westwards, a prisoner of war camp across the main road at the extreme western site, and an area of workshops with a small foundry to the south of the PoW camp, and to the west of the aircraft area.

The base came in for some criticism on the night of 25 September 1916 - a zeppelin arrived over the city after midnight and dropped several bombs killing 29, injuring 19, and destroying 89 houses with a further 150 suffering damage. Neither searchlights or anti-aircraft guns had been used to try and stop the enemy, and no aircraft were airborne to counter-attack from Coal Aston. The official report was that the base was shrouded in fog, and aircraft could not be launched. Despite the attack, it was felt that by the end of 1916 that the threat of aerial bombardment had diminished enough for No. 33 Squadron to leave the site, and the base then changed to a training role under No. 17 Training Squadron. This is when the site slowly transformed into the NARD, and by 1917, at least ten large hangars had appeared to the west of the grassed field area. The site was retained in 1918 even when the Armistice came and despite its height and its "frequently changeable weather" as it was near to the engineering resources scattered around the greater Sheffield area. The NARD covered an area of 206 acres (83 ha), of which 90 acres (36 ha) was buildings. The two main sites were linked across Dyche Lane by a narrow gauge railway.

In July 1919, a celebratory flying exhibition was put on at the aerodrome to commemorate the signing of the Treaty of Versailles. Over 9,000 people paid entry to the air show.

In December 1921, the land and assets were passed to the Disposal and Liquidation Committee. This described the site as having "...officers' and men's quarters and messes, regimental institute, women's hostel, reception station, vehicle sheds, flight sheds (hangars), workshops, offices, stores and subsidiary buildings." By 1926, demolition was in an advanced stage. The foreman on the site lamented having to demolish sturdy and well-made structures that had hardly been used, but the estimated 10,000 bricks per week that were leaving the site, went into new building estates in Sheffield, Baslow and Bakewell. (Note: One 250-foot (76 m) building took over three weeks to demolish, and yielded and estimated 250,000 bricks alone.)

By 1931, the site had been selected as a municipal airport for Sheffield. It was noted that the site had been laid down with a good estate (roads, tracks, huts and buildings, although most had been demolished), and was therefore ideal to be converted into a civilian aerodrome, with the bonus that most of the land was owned by the local council. General non-military flying continued at the site, and air displays were held yearly, with one accident occurring in 1932 when an RAF flight lieutenant was injured when his low-flying aircraft clipped a stationary aircraft on the ground. 15,000 people witnessed the accident. The large grassed aerodrome field was used as the ground for the Great Yorkshire Show in 1935, prompting a ban on aircraft using the site, promoting fears the ban would never be lifted to allow the site to develop as an aerodrome again.

The site of the North Aircraft Repair Depot and aerodrome grassed landing and take-off area is now the St James retail development.

== See also ==
- RAF Norton, non airfield site close by (to the east) used during the Second World War
