= Dronfield Henry Fanshawe School =

The Dronfield Henry Fanshawe School
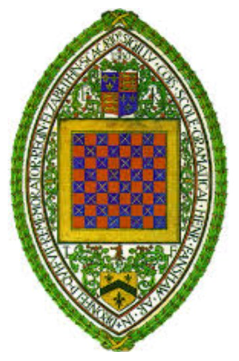

Location
- Green Lane; Dronfield, Derbyshire, S18 8FZ; England; 53°18′05″N 1°27′59″W

Information
- Type: Voluntary controlled school
- Motto: Success With Care
- Established: 1579; 447 years ago
- Founder: Thomas Fanshawe
- Local authority: Derbyshire County Council
- Department for Education URN: 112969 Tables
- Ofsted: Reports
- Chair of Governors: Richard Gilson
- Headteacher: Martyn Cooper
- Staff: 150
- Gender: Mixed
- Age: 11 to 19
- Enrolment: 1779
- Colours: Green and Black
- Alumni: Old Dronfieldians
- School seal: Latin: SIGILLU COIS LIBERAE SCOLE GRAMATICAL HENR FANSHAW AR IN DRONFELD OVH VII REMEMERATOR REGIN ELIZABETH IN SCACARIO
- Website: https://dhfs.uk

The Dronfield Henry Fanshawe School is a co-educational state comprehensive school for 11- to 18-year-olds, in the town of Dronfield, Derbyshire, United Kingdom.

== History ==
Dronfield Grammar School, later renamed the Henry Fanshawe School, was founded in 1578, by the will of Henry Fanshawe, whose wish it was for his nephew, Thomas Fanshawe, to establish the school. Henry Fanshawe had been a local boys' schoolmaster in the town, with a school on a small site on the outskirts of neighbouring Holmesfield. Although his school building no longer exists, a small lane leads into the fields, called 'Fanshawe Lane'. The present school succeeds three previous schools, the Henry Fanshawe School, Gosforth Secondary School and the Gladys Buxton School. The Henry Fanshawe School and The Gosforth School merged in 1990 to form The Dronfield School (a two site school) with the closure of the Gladys Buxton School, and this then became the Dronfield Henry Fanshawe School in 2004, a single site school, with the closure of the Gosforth site. At present, the Gladys Buxton site remains disused for public schooling use, yet is retained as a reserve should numbers rise, or alternative teaching space be needed. The Gosforth site (formerly the Gosforth School) was demolished in 2005, and Derbyshire County Council have used the extensive fields for a sports development. The Dronfield Henry Fanshawe School was officially opened on 28 January 1991 by Harry Barnes, then Labour MP for North East Derbyshire. The renamed and refurbished school was opened in September 2004 by Ruth Kelly, secretary of state for Education at the time. The school was awarded Technology College status in 2001.

=== Dronfield Grammar School, The Henry Fanshawe School ===
Dronfield Grammar School, later the Henry Fanshawe School, opened to educate boys of Dronfield in 1578, by Thomas Fanshawe, nephew of Henry Fanshawe. However, there is evidence to suggest Henry Fanshawe had educated boys in neighbouring Holmesfield for some years. Originally the school occupied a house on Church Street which still stands today with the original inscriptions on the walls from former pupils with in the school hall and original stained glass. Although the school was relocated with increasing pupil numbers, to the current site, on Green Lane, Dronfield. The first building to be built here is now the western edge of 'A block', which now houses I.T. rooms, management offices, finance and reprographics. Before the 1970s, it was also known as Dronfield Grammar School, after this point, it was renamed the Dronfield School. A devastating fire in 1993 destroyed 60% of this site. These buildings were rebuilt, and are now known as 'E block'.

=== The Gladys Buxton School ===
Opening in 1960, the Gladys Buxton School opened to serve 11–14 year olds in the recently developed area of Coal Aston. It was officially opened on 7 March 1961 by Gladys Buxton. The school was similar to the Gosforth High School, relatively the same size with sizeable playing fields. Students would later feed into Henry Fanshawe School. The school was closed in 1990 in order that the Gladys Buxton School, Gosforth Secondary School and Henry Fanshawe School would form the Dronfield School. As a consequence of this, Gladys Buxton School was closed, mainly due to increasing building maintenance costs and falling numbers. Remaining staff and students were relocated, staff going to both sites, students to the Gosforth site.

=== The Gosforth School ===
The Gosforth Secondary Modern School was opened in 1955 to serve 11–15 year olds in the Dronfield area, and the larger numbers brought in by the new housing estates. It was officially opened in June 1956 by Lady Simon of Wythenshawe (Shena Potter), the wife of Ernest Simon, 1st Baron Simon of Wythenshawe. It operated under the Gosforth name until 1990 when it was merged with The Gladys Buxton School and the Henry Fanshawe School to form The Dronfield School, when after this it received some staff and students from The Gladys Buxton School. From 1990 up to 2001 it catered for all 11–14 year olds in Dronfield, and for the 2002–3 academic years this was reduced to 11–13, to form the initial stages of another merger. The Dronfield School would become a single site school, and so The Dronfield School, Gosforth site was decommissioned in 2003, and demolished in early 2005, with all students and staff being relocated to the Fanshawe site, being now known as 'Dronfield Henry Fanshawe School', often shortened to 'Henry Fanshawe', 'Fanshawe' or 'DHFS'.

== Blocks ==
- A Block – This is the original Victorian block, although it has been extended many times. It is located in the southernmost area of the school site. The southern side, overlooking Chesterfield Road, is the oldest section. This building houses ICT and Citizenship/Lifeskills rooms, as well as a few English classrooms, the Leadership Team, Reprographics and the Finance department. It also home to the ELC (E-Learning Centre), used by the school for classes if teachers are missing or need computer space. There is a quadrangle (courtyard) in the centre, named the Memorial Garden, with a pond and memorial to war victims and former students and staff that have died.
- B Block- This block was also built in the Victorian era and was originally the headmaster's house, however has changed much since then. In more modern times, it housed Student Services, a facility to aid students throughout the school day if they require assistance and to integrate with students with learning or behavioural difficulties. However, Student Services recently moved to the E-Block, making B-Block largely redundant.
- C Block – This block was built in 1970 next to B Block, housing a variety of facilities. On the lower-ground floor is the Post-16 area, Business Studies and Law. The Post-16 area also includes the Hub, a dedicated Post-16 social and dining space, which was refurbished in 2013. On the ground floor is Geography; on the mezzanine level is Vocational Education (which includes Health and Social Care, Leisure and Tourism, etc.); on the first floor is Sociology; and on the second floor is History, Religious Education and Psychology.
- D Block – This block was also built in 1970 in the same architectural style as C Block, only smaller. It stands immediately to the north of C Block on the western side of the site, adjacent to the Princess Road entrance, and is the smallest block on the site. On the ground floor, the block currently houses the Fanshawe Learning Resource Centre, the school's library, which was extended in 2013 Also on the ground floor, and on the mezzanine level, are a pair of dynamic teaching rooms (large rooms, with large numbers of computers and tables) which house Film Studies and non-practical Science lessons, with the second floor housing Religious Education and a Physical Education theory room.
- E Block – This is the largest building, built in 1996, replacing an old block that was destroyed by fire. This houses the school reception; part of the English, Science and Design & Technology faculties; the Phoenix Hall assembly hall and dining area; and two other, dedicated dining areas, the Henry's Diner and Fanshawe Diner. It also now houses the new Student Services after they were moved from B-Block in 2020. E Block takes up much of the eastern part of the site.
- F Block – Completed in 2005, this is the second largest block, stretching across the northern area of the site from east to west. The block houses the Modern Foreign Languages, Mathematics, Science, Art, Drama and Music faculties; the Fanshawe Hall (used for drama and school performances); the Foyer, used by the School Band and drama for performance practices; and one set of PE changing rooms.
- G Block – Completed in September 2022 and previously the Terrapins, it is a newer version of the Terrapins housing Creative and Expressive Arts (music and drama), a classroom for PSHE (Physical, Social and Health Education) and a classroom for English. Located immediately to the west of E Block on the opposite side of one of the main outdoor pathways between blocks. The block features full DDA compliance and several other facilities such as sound-proofing and air-conditioning.
- Sports Hall – rebuilt in the 1980s following the fire. On the ground floor, as well as the main sports hall, there is a set of changing rooms and toilets and also the Multi-Gym, which houses gym equipment. On the second floor is the Movement Hall, used as a secondary sports hall to the main downstairs space, and mainly used for dance and table tennis lessons; the table tennis tables are stored up here. During examination periods, the Sports Hall and Movement Hall are often converted into examination halls.

To the north of F Block are a set of concrete tennis courts and, to the north of that, a modern synthetic grass full-size football field with floodlights. The synthetic grass was replaced with a more modern variant in 2013. In between D and E Blocks is an outdoor covered seating area which is used for dining in summer. It includes many wooden benches for the students to sit as they eat, as well as many forms of entertainment for the students, such as Table-Tennis tables. The school also own a field off Green Lane opposite to the school, adjacent to Cliffe Park, which is used by the PE faculty and contains marked rounders and javelin fields, a running track and long jump sand pit. The PE faculty also occasionally make use of Cliffe Park itself, usually when examinations mean the closure of the Sports Hall and reduced on-site capacity, with the faculty making use of the tennis courts and 5-a-side astroturf football pitch.

== Past Heads ==
- Thomas Revell (1579–1584)
- ? Fletcher (1584–1592)
- ? Waterhouse (1592–1626)
- ? Peck (1626 – c.1636)
- Francis Alsopp (c.1636–1640)
- ? Poole (1640–1660)
- William Whitaker (1660–1680)
- ? Mason (1680 – c.1692)
- Robert Good (c.1692–1722)
- John Baynes (1722 – c.1750)
- ? Allison (c.1750–1774)
- John Walker (1774–1797)
- John Russell (1797 – c.1809)

school closed c.1809–1814

- William Pidcock (1814–1847)
- John Cockerton (1847–1857)
- John F. Fanshawe (1857–1866)
- Edward Young Haslam (1866–1869)
- Waller K. Bedingfield (1869–1888)
- Charles Chapman Baggaley (1888–1926)
- Norman Shera Millican (1926–1953)
- Peter John Wallis (1953–1958)
- Maurice Edmundson (1958–1964)
- Peter Henry Andrews (1964–1985)
- Thomas I. Thomas (1985–1994)
- Christopher J. Burke (1994–2005)
- Anton Gibbs (acting) (2005–2006)
- Theresa B. Roche (2006–2019)
- M. Cooper (2019–)

== Catchment area ==
The School takes pupils from a wide area surrounding Dronfield, including the areas surrounding Apperknowle, Holmesfield, and Unstone, and parts of southern Sheffield and northern Chesterfield. and also Barlow.

== Academic performance ==
The school gets GCSE results well above the England average and A-level results also above the England average. In 2010, A-level results were: 98% Pass Grade and 24% A* Grade. As of the latest Ofsted inspection in November 2015, the school is considered to be officially Outstanding in all aspects, including effectiveness of leadership and management; quality of teaching, learning and assessment; personal development, behaviour and welfare; outcomes for pupils; 16 to 19 study programmes; and overall.

== Alumni ==
- Rick Allen, drummer of Def Leppard
- Gary Cahill, professional footballer for Crystal Palace and the England national football team
- Adam Etches, boxer
- D. J. Needham, Professor of Applied Mathematics, University of Birmingham, UK
- Richard Peacock, footballer
- Kevin Pressman, Howard's brother, and goalkeeper for many years for Sheffield Wednesday
- Mark Roe, golfer
- Alison Slack, Miss United Kingdom 1986

=== Dronfield Grammar School ===
- Roy Goodall, former captain of Huddersfield Town in the 1930s
- Ron Hall, former Head Boy, co-founded The Sunday Times' Insight team in 1963 (with Clive Irving and Jeremy Wallington under Denis Hamilton) which helped to expose John Profumo; Editor of Insight from 1964 to 1966; Editor from 1978 to 1981 of The Sunday Times Magazine, and from 1982 to 1986 of Sunday Express Magazine
