= Middle Handley =

Village in Derbyshire, England

Coordinates: 53.296134°N 1.395264°W

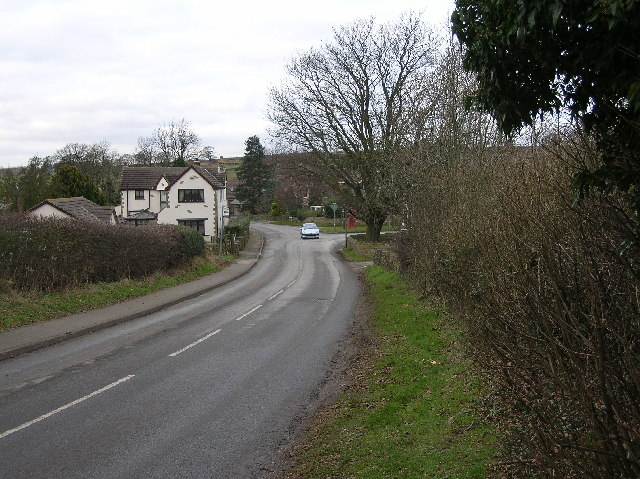

- Location within Derbyshire
- District: North East Derbyshire
- Shire county: Derbyshire
- Region: East Midlands
- Country: England
- Sovereign state: United Kingdom
- Post town: SHEFFIELD
- Postcode district: S21
- Police: Derbyshire
- Fire: Derbyshire
- Ambulance: East Midlands

Middle Handley is a village in North East Derbyshire in the county of Derbyshire in England.

== Location ==
Middle Handley lies just south of the village of Marsh Lane, south-west of Eckington, west of West Handley and about 3 miles (4.8 km) south of the village of Ridgeway.

== History ==
Like most hamlets and villages in the area, during the 17th and 18th centuries the area was known for sickle smithing and farming.

St. John The Baptist Church, which is found in the centre of the village, dates back to 1838.
