= Dronfield =

Town in Derbyshire, England

Coordinates: 53.3024°N 1.4664°W

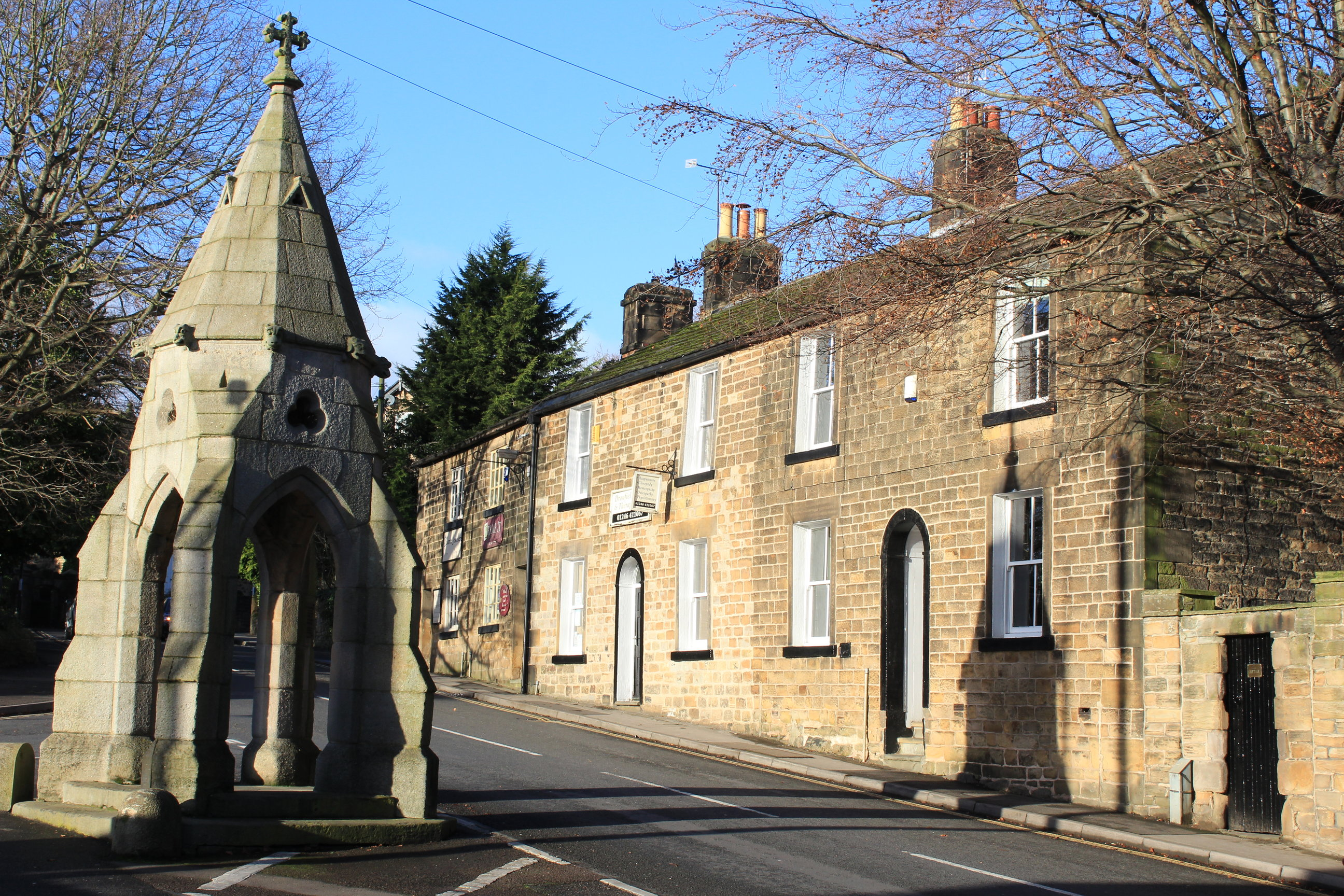
- Peel Monument and High Street

- Location within Derbyshire
- Population: 21,261 (2011 census)
- OS grid reference: SK355785
- District: North East Derbyshire
- Shire county: Derbyshire
- Region: East Midlands
- Country: England
- Sovereign state: United Kingdom
- Post town: DRONFIELD
- Postcode district: S18
- Dialling code: 01246
- Police: Derbyshire
- Fire: Derbyshire
- Ambulance: East Midlands
- UK Parliament: North East Derbyshire

Dronfield is a town in North East Derbyshire, England, which includes Dronfield Woodhouse and Coal Aston. It lies in the valley of the River Drone between Chesterfield and Sheffield. The Peak District National Park is three miles (4.8 km) to the west. The name comes from the Old English Dranfleld, probably meaning an open land infested with drone bees.

The town existed before the 1086 Domesday Book, and has a 13th-century parish church. In 1662, Charles II granted the town a market, although this later ceased. The industrial history of the town includes coal mining, the wool trade, the production of soap and steel, and engineering. Today a range of manufacturing firms still operate in the town. The stadium to the north of the town is officially "The Home of Football", providing the playing surface for Sheffield F.C. of the United Counties League Premier Division North, the world's oldest football club. The stadium to the east of the town is the Stonelow Stadium, home of Dronfield Town F.C., who play in the United Counties League Division One

Dronfield's population increased in the post-war years from 6,500 in 1945 to 21,261 in the 2011 Census.

== History ==
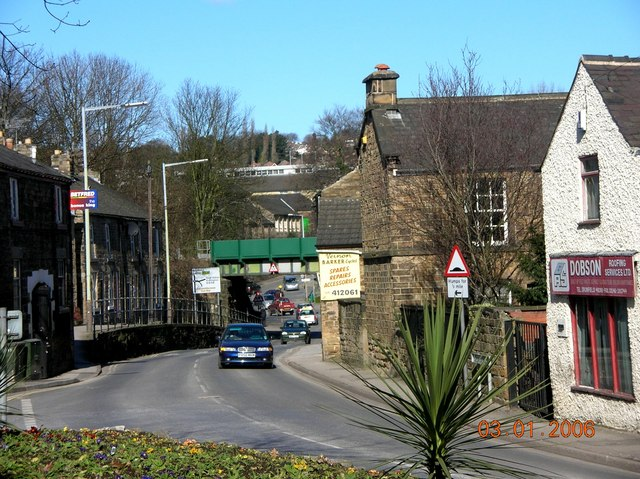
The old Sheffield-Chesterfield road in Dronfield

Dronfield was in existence before the 1086 Domesday Book, though little is known about its early history. It suffered after the Norman Conquest when William the Conqueror sought to bring the North of England under control. Its name derives from the Old English drān and feld, meaning open land infested with drones (male bees).

The Church of St John the Baptist was built by 1135 when Oscot was rector and the parish of Dronfield covered Little Barlow, Coal Aston, Povey, Holmesfield, Apperknowle, Dore and Totley. The Guild of the Blessed Virgin Mary was established in 1349 in the hall of the chantry priests. However, due to the Dissolution of the Monasteries and the subsequent suppression of the guilds and chantries in 1547, it became a local inn which still operates today as the Green Dragon Inn.

During the 16th century Dronfield with its sheep farmers had a significant number of families working in the wool trade, engaged in spinning and weaving and also the production and selling of cloth. Soaper Lane, being next to the river, was the centre of the soap-making and tanning industry in the town, with a dye works also situated there. In 1662 Dronfield was granted a market by Charles II, but in the 18th century, due to the proximity of Sheffield and Chesterfield, the market went into decline, however it is still held every Thursday in the rear car park of the civic centre on Farwater Lane.

Between the 16th and 19th centuries Dronfield grew around various industries, the most widespread of which was coal mining, with pits at Stubley being mentioned in the 16th century and a map of Hill Top in the 17th century showing some workings. Further mines were opened at Coal Aston in 1785 and Carr Lane in Dronfield Woodhouse in 1795. The town also benefited from trade with the lead mining and grindstone industries in the Peak District. The wealth of the Rotheram family, who became the Lords of the Manor of Dronfield, was based on the lead trade.

The Wilson-Cammell steelworks was built in the town in 1872–3, following the completion of the Midland Main Line through the town in April 1869. Bessemer steel was first blown at the site in March 1873 and the plant was soon capable of producing 700 tons - mostly as rails - every week. Dronfield became a boom town, but its prosperity was short-lived; although more efficient and profitable than other works in the Sheffield area, its site had limitations that could not compete with low-cost coastal locations, and in 1883 production moved from Dronfield to Workington in Cumberland (now Cumbria). Steelworkers and their families moved too. It is estimated that 1,500 townspeople made the trip to Workington. 'Dronnies', as the people of Workington called the newcomers, formed Workington AFC in 1888.

In 1993 Dronfield Henry Fanshawe School (formerly the 'Dronfield School' and previously 'Dronfield Grammar School') suffered major damage when its 1960s system-built blocks were completely gutted by fire, requiring all firefighting resources from all nearby towns and Sheffield to control the blaze. The historic Victorian quadrangle and library, as well as the sixth-form block, survived. The remains of the modern school were subsequently demolished and mobile cabins were used as classrooms until 1996 when the school was rebuilt.

Dronfield Civic Hall was completely rebuilt in 1999.

== Geography ==
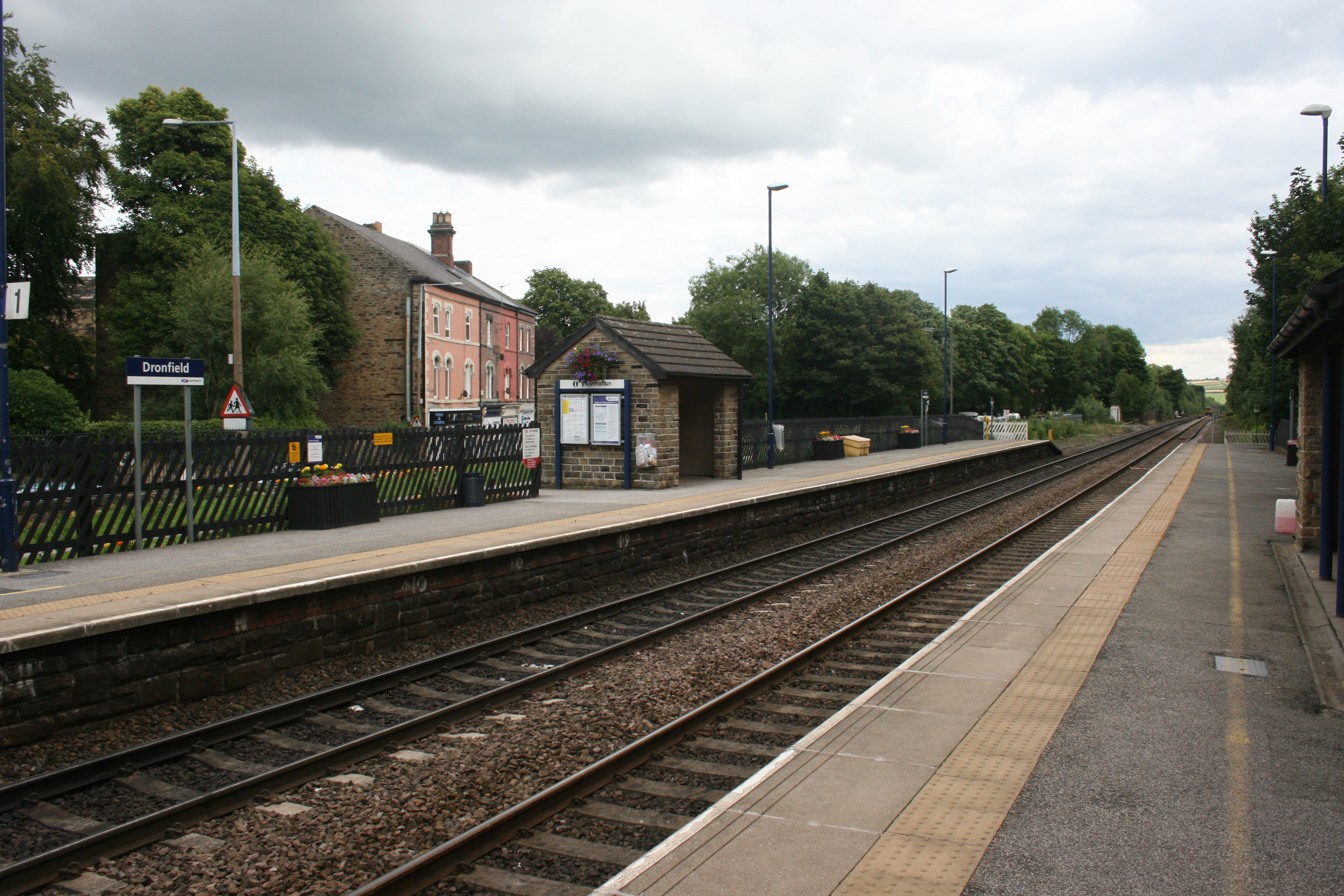
Dronfield Railway Station

Dronfield is sited in the valley of the River Drone in North East Derbyshire, England. The Drone is a small river that, after flowing through Dronfield, joins the Barlow Brook at Unstone, and then flows into the River Rother at Whittington Moor, Chesterfield.

Dronfield is situated roughly midway between the town of Chesterfield to the south and the city of Sheffield, for which it is a commuter town, to the north. The A61 trunk road Dronfield–Unstone Bypass cuts through the town, although this is not directly accessible from the town centre itself. Instead a network of secondary roads serves local traffic: the B6054, B6056, B6057 and B6158. Dronfield is also served via rail through Dronfield railway station.

Dronfield covers an area of 3,457 acres (13.99 km^{2}) and has as neighbours the villages and hamlets of Unstone, Holmesfield, Barlow, Apperknowle, Hundall, Marsh Lane and Eckington.

Situated close to the Pennines and many of the beauty spots of Derbyshire, Dronfield also has easy access to the Peak District National Park just 3 miles (4.8 km) away. There are four conservation areas either wholly or partly within Dronfield's parish area: Dronfield (adopted 1971), Coal Aston (1983), Dronfield Woodhouse (1990) and Moss Valley (1990); the first three cover the respective old village centres and are wholly within the parish, whereas Moss Valley covers a mixed landscape and is mostly outside the parish, to the northeast.

== Economy ==
The town has a range of businesses, mainly located on the Callywhite Lane Industrial Estate at the eastern end of the town, and along Wreakes Lane and Stubley Lane northwest of the town centre. The main businesses in the town were originally associated with engineering trades, but over recent years have diversified. William Lees Iron Foundry, manufacturer of machinery parts, moved to Dronfield in 1870 and was responsible for major growth in the town at that time. Until the mid-1970s it specialised in production of malleable iron castings, though much production now is of spheroidal graphite iron.

Major companies with works in Dronfield include Henry Boot PLC, a property development and construction company (the divisions Henry Boot Construction Ltd and Banner Plant Ltd have regional offices in the town), Padley & Venables Ltd, manufacturers of tools for use in drilling, tunnelling, mining, quarrying and construction/demolition, Land Instruments International, international designer and manufacturer of industrial and environmental monitoring instruments (in 2006 this was acquired by AMETEK Inc), and Gunstones Bakery, which was founded in Sheffield in 1862, moved to Dronfield in 1950, taken over by Northern Foods in 1971 and acquired by 2 Sisters in 2011; in 2013 it employed more than 1,400 people.

== Demography ==
In the 1841 census the population was 1,986 inhabitants.

In the 2011 census Dronfield's civil parish (which includes Dronfield, Coal Aston, and Dronfield Woodhouse) had 9,388 dwellings, 9,267 households and a population of 21,261, of whom 10,333 were male and 10,928 female. 25.1% of the population were aged 65 or over (compared to 16.4% for England as a whole), and 16.1% were under the age of 16 (18.9% for England as a whole). 98.3% of Dronfield's population were of white ethnicity (compared to 85.5% for England as a whole).

On 16 October 1975, the £6.5m 5-mile (8.0 km) A61 Dronfield–Unstone Bypass was opened running through the western side of the town, to allow easier access for travel between the larger populated areas of Sheffield to the north and Chesterfield to the south. To a certain extent the town is a dormitory community for workers in these settlements.

== Notable buildings ==
St. John the Baptist Parish Church

Within Dronfield's civil parish are 42 structures that are listed by Historic England for their historical or architectural interest. One structure - the parish church of St John the Baptist - is listed as Grade I, four structures - Aston End, Chiverton House, Dronfield Woodhouse Hall farmhouse and the building northeast of The Hall on High Street - are Grade II*, and the rest - including Dronfield Manor, the Peel Monument and several buildings in Church Street and High Street - are Grade II.

The parish church of St. John the Baptist dates from the late 13th to 14th century, with mid-16th-century alterations. It has ashlar and coursed rubble walls of coal measures sandstone, with graduated slate and lead roof coverings and an octagonal spire. Repairs were made in about 1819, with more alterations in 1855 and 1916. There are over 120 brasses and monuments, many of which line the floor in the chancel and nave. One gravestone within the church is that of Thomas Calton who was interred on 28th February 1637. He and his wife Elizabeth lived in Quoit Green, then known as Coate Green, in a Grade II Listed house which still stands in that locality of the town.

Aston End is a medieval house with additions and alterations made in the 16th, 17th and 19th centuries. It is built in an L-plan with coursed rubble walls of coal measures sandstone and a stone slated roof. Chiverton House, originally called Dam Flatt House, dates from between 1692 and 1709 and has a flat symmetrical front with cross windows, a central gable and towers at each end. It was altered in 1712 and the 19th century, though not significantly. The attached boundary walls, gatepiers and railings form part of its listing. Dronfield Woodhouse Hall farmhouse was built in 1533, as suggested by dendrodating (by the University of Nottingham) and is a house of irregular layout, built from coursed squared coal measures sandstone with a stone slated roof. It was reworked extensively in the early 18th century, with further alterations in the 19th and 20th centuries. The building north-east of The Hall on High Street is a former farm outbuilding that dates from the late 17th century, but it also contains a significant amount of an earlier timber-framed building, possibly a medieval hall. It is built in an L-plan with walls of coursed squared coal measures sandstone and a stone slated roof. In 2004 it was in a poor state of repair and was gifted to the community; in 2015 it was restored and extended at a cost of more than £1.6 million, with over £1.25m provided by the Heritage Lottery Fund. It is now used as a heritage visitor centre and exhibition and community function space, with modern catering and cloakroom facilities.

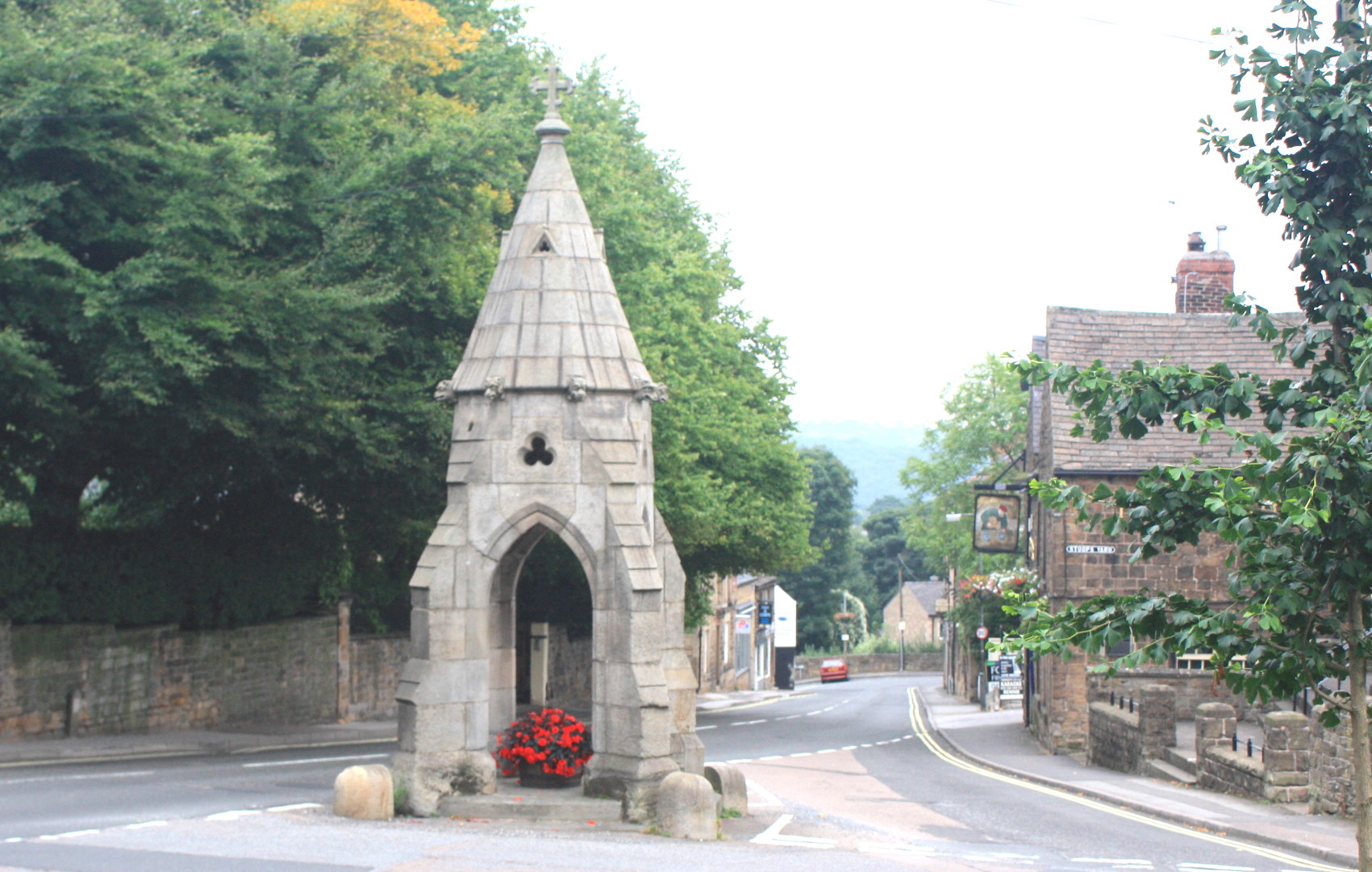
The Peel Monument

The Peel Monument, situated on the town's High Street, was built in 1854 out of gritstone as a tribute to Sir Robert Peel, to commemorate his repeal of the Corn Laws in 1846. The monument is very distinctive, and is often portrayed in images of the town.

Near to the Peel Monument on High Street is a 16th-century house known as The Cottage. It is believed that it was once owned by Lord Byron (1788–1824), although there is no proof that he was a Dronfield resident.

== Culture and community ==
=== Culture ===
Notable events are the annual Dronfield Gala and the Dronfield Woodhouse and Coal Aston well dressings, which are held in July. Dronfest, a music festival, also takes place in the town in the summer months of the year.

Since 1972 Dronfield has been twinned with Sindelfingen in Germany. A park in Dronfield Woodhouse was renamed Sindelfingen Park in the early 1990s to celebrate this partnership. Dronfield Henry Fanshawe School has an annual student exchange with a school in Sindelfingen, which helps establish links between the young people in the two towns.

=== Community facilities ===
Dronfield has a library, sports centre, health centre and community centre. There are three parks (Cliffe Park, Sindelfingen Park and Jubilee Park) and several play areas. Cliffe Park has three tennis courts, a basketball court, a children's play area, a bowling green, a meeting room with kitchen, and a multi-use games area with changing rooms. Sindelfingen Park has play areas and basketball courts.

In January 2010 a new £2.5 million sports complex opened at Gosforth Fields, on the old Gosforth School site. Run by three local teams, AFC Dronfield, Dronfield Town & Dronfield RFU, the complex includes a state-of-the-art 3G pitch, 10 full-size pitches, changing facilities and a social area. It was officially opened by Sir Trevor Brooking and John Owen. Gosforth Fields is the home of Dronfield Rugby Club.

Dronfield also has several social clubs: The Contact Club, Dronfield Woodhouse Sports & Social Club, Hill Top Sports & Social Club and the Pioneer Club.

Dronfield is home to 1890 (Dronfield) ATC Squadron.

== Media ==
Local news and television programmes are provided by BBC Yorkshire and ITV Yorkshire. Television signals are received from either the Emley Moor, Sheffield or Chesterfield TV transmitters.

Local radio stations are BBC Radio Sheffield, Greatest Hits Radio North Derbyshire, and Chesterfield Radio, a community based radio station that broadcast from Chesterfield.

The town is served by the local newspaper, Derbyshire Times (formerly Dronfield Advertiser).

Dronfield is served by a monthly magazine (The Dronfield Eye)The Dronfield Eye also publishes the annual Dronfield Directory, which lists details of hundreds of local groups, societies and organisations.

Dronfield Digital, a youth-focused online publication which emerged in late 2012, provides opinion pieces, fake news and satire of small-town life in Dronfield.

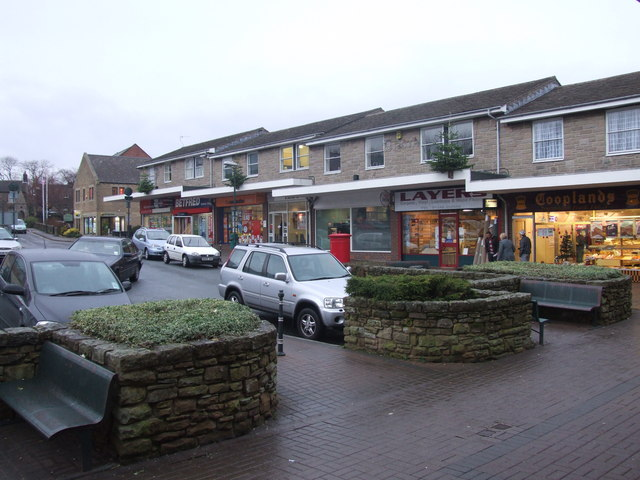
Shops in Dronfield Civic Centre, off the High Street

== Education ==
- Dronfield Henry Fanshawe School on Green Lane takes its intake from all of the eight schools within Dronfield and the surrounding area, occasionally also including pupils from Sheffield and the Chesterfield area. As of November 2015 it had 1,779 pupils.
- Dronfield Junior and Infants Schools are the biggest primary schools in Dronfield, reaching more than 600 pupils.
- William Levick Primary School had a school roll of 169 pupils as of May 2016.

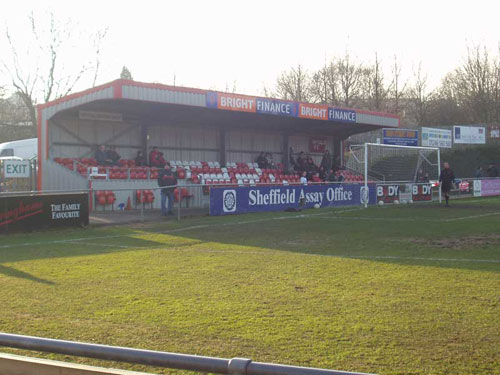
Sheffield F.C. football stadium

== Sport and leisure ==
Two senior football clubs play in Dronfield; Sheffield F.C., the world's oldest football club, play at the Coach and Horses ground renamed as The Home of Football Stadium, while Dronfield Town play at the Stonelow Stadium.

Norton Woodseats F.C. were originally from Sheffield, South Yorkshire, but were based for most of their existence in Dronfield.

There is a rugby league side that goes by the name of Dronfield Drifters RLFC.

The leisure centre is next to the civic centre.

The cricket pitch on Stonelow Road is the home of the local Coal Aston Cricket Club. The ground has high-quality facilities including home and away changing rooms, a tea room, an electronic scoreboard, a seating area in front of the pavilion and an astro-turf practice net.

The Dronfield 2000 Rotary Walk is a 14.5-mile (23.3 km) circular walk that circumnavigates the town.

GB3 team JHR Developments are based in Dronfield.

== Notable people ==
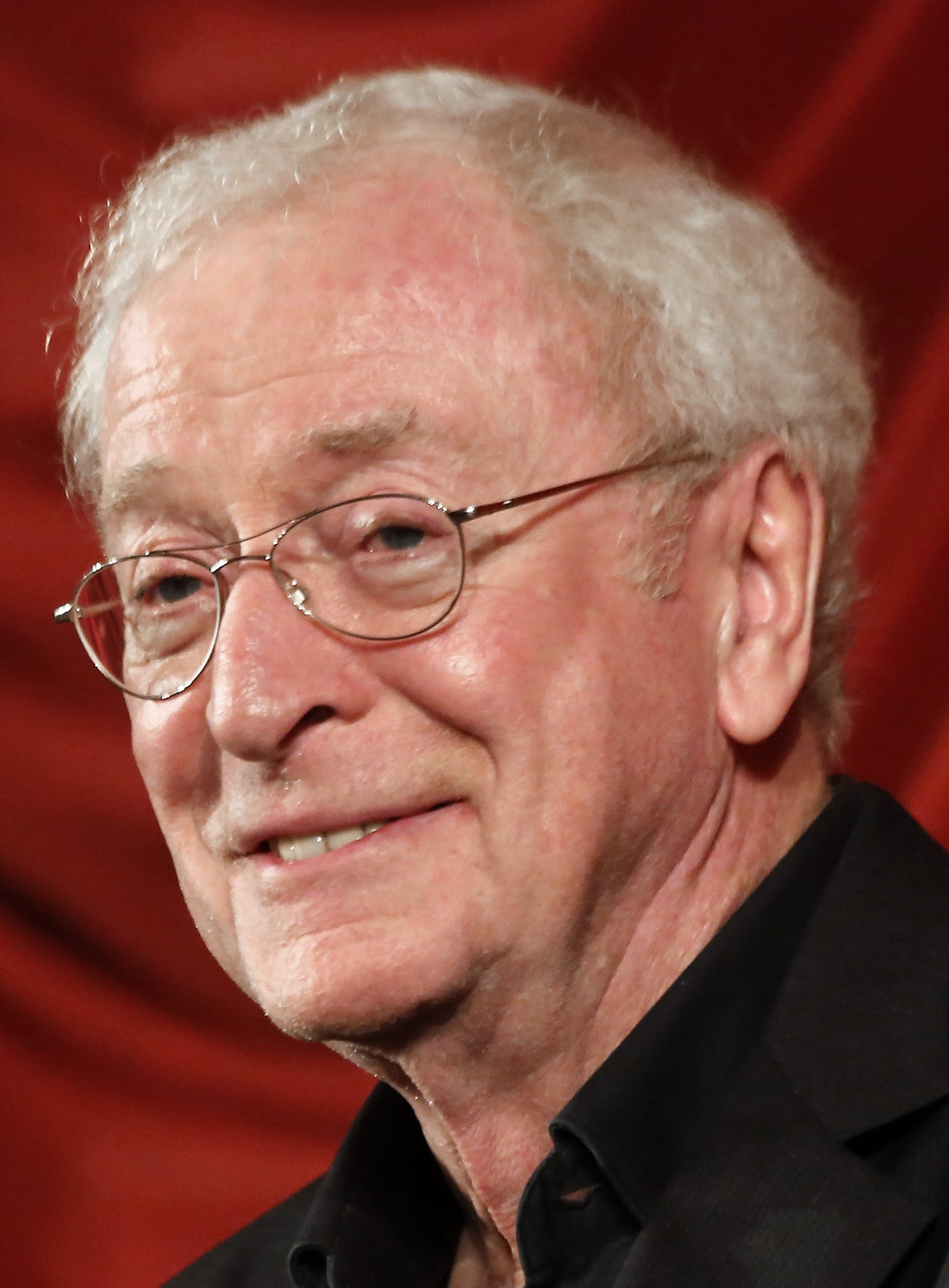
Michael Caine, 2012

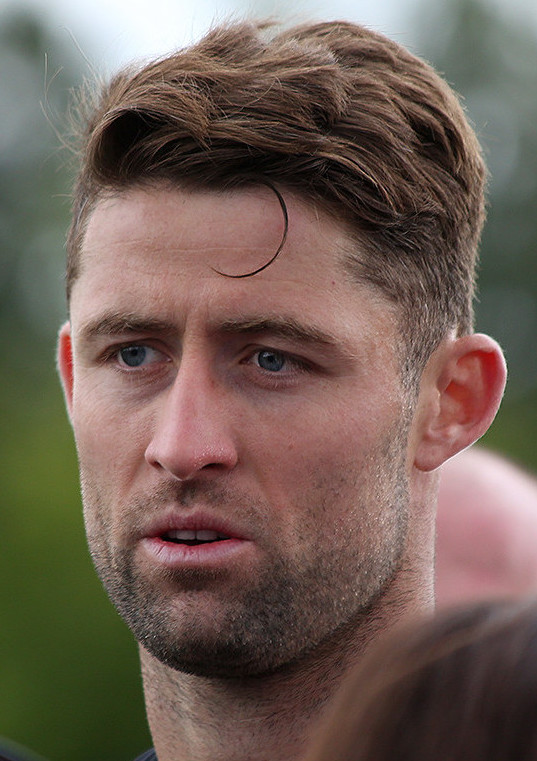
Gary Cahill, 2018

Notable people were either born or have lived in Dronfield include:

- John Hewitt (1880–1961), a South African herpetologist, zoologist and archaeologist, born here.
- Michael Caine (born 1933), film actor, lived in Dronfield in the early 1960s.
- Harry Barnes (born 1936), local MP for North East Derbyshire, 1987 to 2005, a local resident since 1969.
- Bruce Chatwin (1940–1989), novelist and travel writer, was christened in the parish church and briefly lived in the town during the first weeks of his life.
- Dave Berry (born 1941), singer and musician, lives in the town.
- Rick Allen (born 1963), drummer with rock group Def Leppard, was born in the town.
- Robert Hendy-Freegard (born 1971), conman, nicknamed "The Puppetmaster", subject of a Netflix documentary in 2022.
- Jessica Cunningham (born 1987), actress, model and TV personality,The Apprentice 2016 contestant.

=== Sport ===
- Harry Maskrey (1880–1927), football goalkeeper, who played 197 games for Derby County
- Roy Goodall (1902–1982), footballer, who played 403 games for Huddersfield Town and 25 for England, born here
- Alan Ward (1947-2026), cricketer, who played in five Test matches for England and 163 First-class cricket matches for Derbyshire and Leicestershire
- Gary Cahill (born 1985), footballer, played 459 games including 191 for Chelsea and 61 for England, grew up in the town and attended Dronfield Henry Fanshawe School.
