= West Handley =

Hamlet in Derbyshire, England

Coordinates: 53.294168°N 1.405462°W

- Location within Derbyshire
- District: North East Derbyshire
- Shire county: Derbyshire
- Region: East Midlands
- Country: England
- Sovereign state: United Kingdom
- Post town: SHEFFIELD
- Postcode district: S21
- Police: Derbyshire
- Fire: Derbyshire
- Ambulance: East Midlands

West Handley is a hamlet in North East Derbyshire in the county of Derbyshire in England.

== Location ==
West Handley lies just south of the village of Marsh Lane, south-west of Eckington, East of Middle Handley and around 3 miles south of the village of Ridgeway.

== History ==
Although today the hamlet is nothing more than a group of large farm houses, the area was historically known for sickle smithing as well as farming.
