= Castings plc =

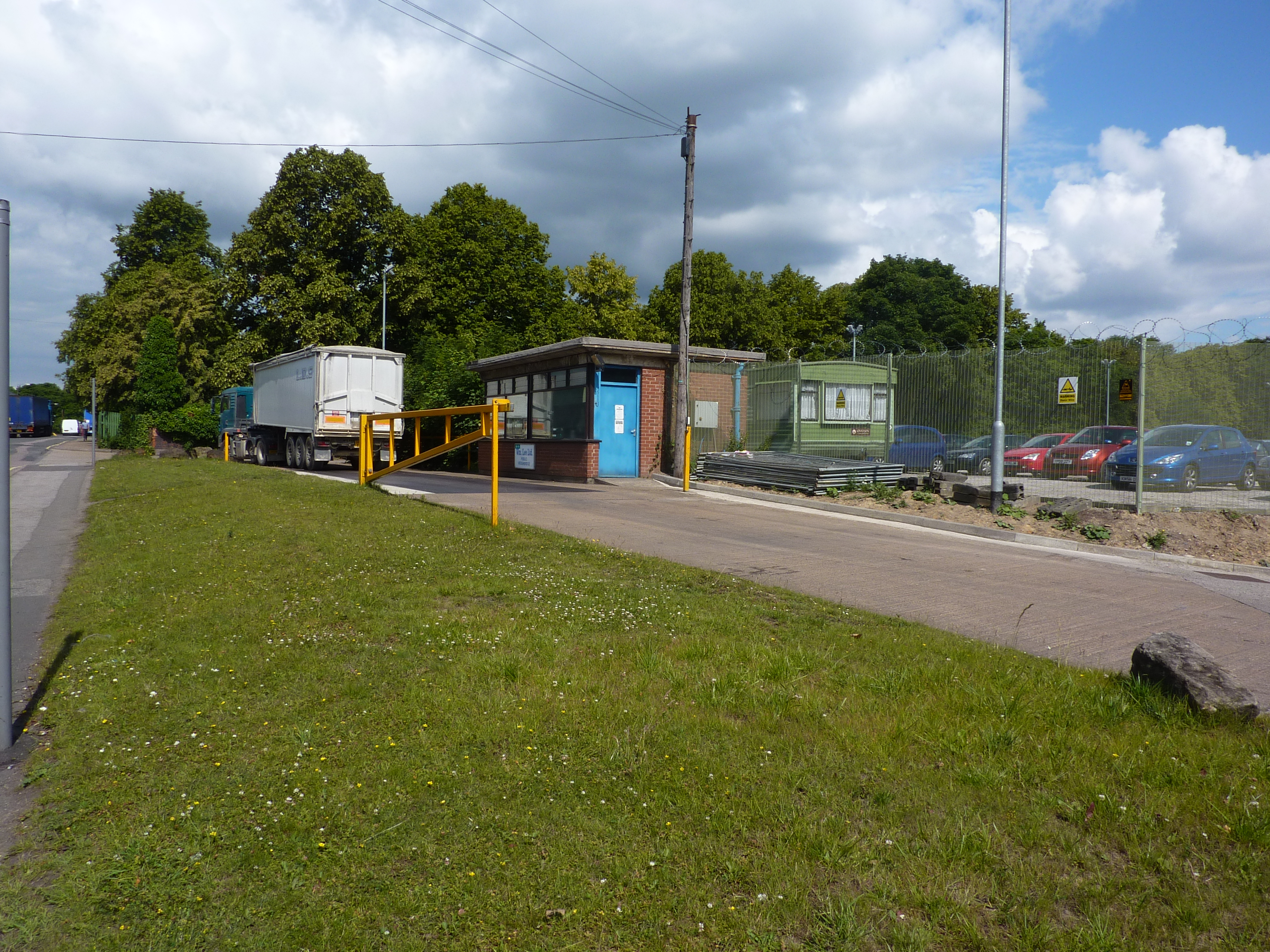
Foundry entrance, Dronfield

Castings plc is a British metal casting and machining company based in Brownhills in Walsall, West Midlands. As of 2024, its main industry was making parts for heavy trucks. Established in 1835, it had around 1000 employees in 2026 and is listed on the London Stock Exchange.

It operates the William Lee foundry in Dronfield (also spelled Wm Lee), founded in 1860, and Ductile Castings in Scunthorpe as subsidiaries.
