= Blister hangar =

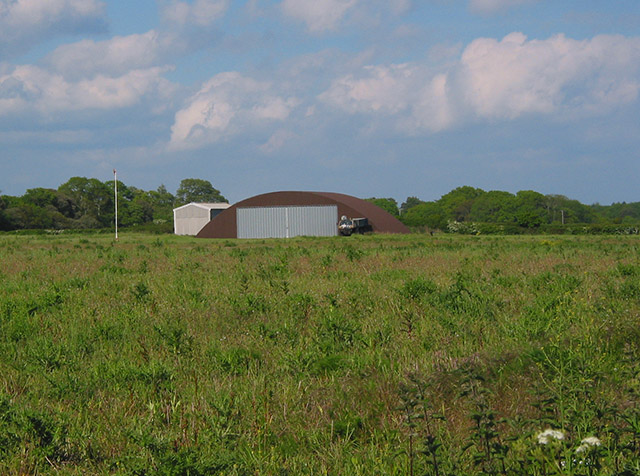
Remains of Lymington Airfield, Snooks Farm

A blister hangar is a type of arched, portable aircraft hangar. It was designed by Graham Dawbarn, who also designed buildings at a number of airports, and was patented by Miskins and Sons in 1939. It was originally made of wooden ribs clad with profiled steel sheets; steel lattice ribs and corrugated steel sheet cladding later became the norm. It does not require a foundation slab and can be anchored to the ground with iron stakes. Numerous examples were manufactured for military use in World War II and various different sizes were available.

After the war, many were repurposed as agricultural or industrial buildings, but some still remain in use on airfields such as Fairoaks, Redhill, Coal Aston, White Waltham, and Denham.
