= St Swithin's Church, Holmesfield =

St Swithin’s Church, Holmesfield
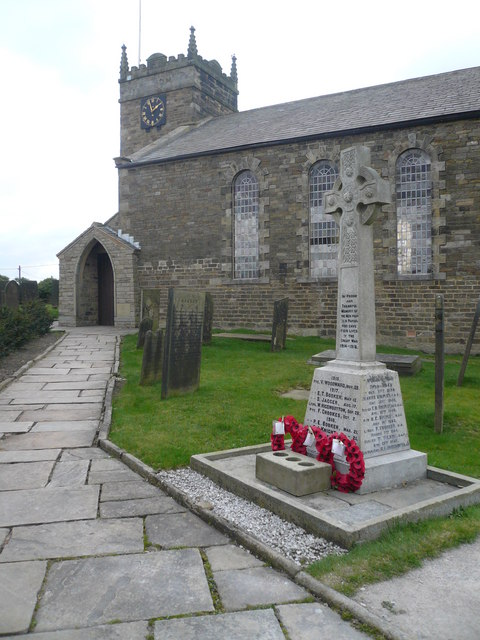
- St Swithin’s Church, Holmesfield (Photo by Alan Heardman)
- St Swithin’s Church, Holmesfield
- 53°17′44.35″N 1°31′14.2″W
- Location: Holmesfield
- Country: England
- Denomination: Church of England

History
- Dedication: St Swithin

Architecture
- Heritage designation: Grade II listed

Administration
- Diocese: Diocese of Derby
- Archdeaconry: Chesterfield
- Deanery: Chesterfield
- Parish: Dronfield with Holmesfield

St Swithin's Church is a Grade II listed parish church in the Church of England in Holmesfield, Derbyshire.

== History ==
The church dates from 1727 with additions in 1826.

In 1890 the church underwent a restoration which comprised putting in new windows, cleaning, painting, varnishing the interior, and installing a new heating apparatus by Ellis Outram of Holmesfield.

The foundation stone was laid by Mrs W.A. Milner for the construction of the chancel on 11 April 1898. It cost £725 and it was opened by the Bishop of Southwell on 12 September 1898. At the same time a new oak pulpit was given in memory of Mrs. Roberts of Queen's Tower, Sheffield, and a new font was provided by Mrs. George Greaves of Sheffield, and Mr and Mrs Goodliffe of Norton provided a chandelier for the chancel. Unfortunately, some of the work in the new chancel was defective and two months later the cross on the chancel was blown down in a heavy gale of wind.

== Parish status ==
The church is in a joint parish with

- St Andrew's Church, Gosforth Valley
- St Philip's Church, Holmesdale
- St Mary's Church, Unstone
- St John the Baptist's Church, Dronfield

== Organ ==
The church contained an organ by Brindley & Foster dating from the 1920s. A specification of the organ can be found on the National Pipe Organ Register. It was replaced by an electronic organ in 1992, and the old pipes and mechanism were removed in 2014.

== See also ==
- Listed buildings in Holmesfield
