= RAF Norton =

Former RAF base in South Yorkshire, England

- Sheffield, West Riding of Yorkshire (Note: The site operated between 1939 and 1965. The area it was located in was the West Riding of Yorkshire until 1974, when the part that it was in became South Yorkshire.) in England

Site information
- Owner: Air Ministry
- Operator: Royal Air Force
- Controlled by: Balloon Command; Signals Command
- Condition: Derelict

Location
- Location within South Yorkshire
- Coordinates: 53.339°N 1.438°W
- Grid reference: SK355808
- Area: 155 acres (63 ha)

Site history
- In use: 1939–1943 No. 16 Balloon Centre (RAF Lightwood); 1943–1965 RAF Norton

Royal Air Force Norton (or RAF Norton), was a non-flying RAF station on the southern edge of Sheffield in Yorkshire, England. The base had two distinct stages in its RAF career, being known as RAF Lightwood between 1939 and 1943, and later RAF Norton between 1943 and 1965. On opening it was part of Balloon Command designated to protect the city of Sheffield, and in its second iteration, the base was part of Signals Command and an aircrew refresher school was also based there.

== History ==
In 1915, land on the south-eastern edge of Sheffield, was prepared to become a landing ground for the use of No.33 Sqn in the Home Defence role across Northern England. The base was named Coal Aston and was to the west of RAF Norton by some 1.452 miles (2.337 km). An altar made from the propellers of crashed aircraft on the Western Front was made here by RAF apprentices in 1919. It was installed in the Airmens Chapel at Southwell Minster. (Note: The altar is credited with being made at RAF Norton (Sheffield) in 1919, but the base did not exist until the late 1930s, and was originally RAF Lightwood, being renamed Norton in 1943. As the altar was used in the church at Norton Woodseats, it is assumed that this is how the error arose.) This location closed in 1919.

With the threat of another war, steps were taken for the defence of important industrial areas of Britain. Sheffield was designated as No. 16 Balloon Centre with No. 33 Group, part of Balloon Command, and the 155-acre (63 ha) RAF Lightwood site was opened in 1939 off Lightwood Lane in Norton to provide a base for training and deployment of a balloon barrage around Sheffield. The site had two squadrons, No. 939 and No 940 Squadrons who had 40 balloons (in five flights) and 32 balloons (in four flights) respectively. No 939 Sqn had a responsibility for Sheffield, and No. 940 had the responsibility for Rotherham. The balloon squadrons soon were converted to being operated by the WAAF so that the men of the RAF could be released for active duty elsewhere. However, the women of the WAAF at Norton were billeted to two per bed, something which the director of the WAAF complained "bitterly" about in April 1940.

After the threat of Luftwaffe action had receded in 1943, the balloons were moved south to defend London and the squadrons at Lightwood disbanded. The base was renamed RAF Norton, and handed over from Balloon Command to Signals Command, with No. 3 Ground Radio and Radar Servicing Squadron (3GRRSS) taking over. 3GRSS used RAF Norton until its closure in 1965. Unlike nearby RAF Coal Aston, RAF Lightwood/RAF Norton was never furnished with a runway or active airfield.

Between 1943 and 1945, Norton was also the site of an aircrew refresher school, a place where those who were branded as having a "Lack of Moral Fibre" (LMF) within Bomber Command were sent to be "corrected". Sometimes, those who endured the three-week course at Norton were sent there simply because their commanding officer believed they had lost their nerve.

The role of the base post Second World War was to train and support the RAF Signals cadre; in 1956, No. 90 Signals Group sent a convoy from Norton to Famagusta in Cyprus. Between 1955 and 1961, Supermarine Spitfire F24 (no. PK724) was used for instructional purposes at Norton, having been sent from No. 9 Maintenance Unit at Cosford. Another Spitfire (TB308) was also based at Norton in the late 1950s, like PK724, it was used as an instructional aircraft. TB308 was scrapped at RAF Bicester in the early 1960s, but PK724 was preserved in the national collection at the museum in Hendon. During the 1950s, the base held many air shows, but aircraft flew in from other bases as the site was not equipped with a runway (despite sometimes being referred to as an aerodrome).

The site was used to accommodate rescue and relief workers in February 1962 after the Great Sheffield Gale had hit the local area killing four, wounding 250 and damaging 70,000 homes. The ensign at RAF Norton was lowered for the last time on 29 January 1965, with complete closure happening in the same year.

== Based units ==
Unit	Dates	Notes	Ref
No. 939 Squadron	1939–1943	Part of 16 Balloon Centre, No. 33 Group, Balloon Command	
No. 940 Squadron	1939–1943	Part of 16 Balloon Centre, No. 33 Group Balloon Command	
No. 2616 RAF Regiment RAuxAF Squadron	1950s	Disbanded at Doncaster in 1957	
No. 3 Ground Radio and Radar Servicing Squadron	1943–1965	Moved to RAF North Luffenham	
No. 35 Maintenance Unit	18 May 1943 – 1 December 1943; 1 October 1951 – 28 February 1953	Sub-site of main contingent at RAF Heywood	
No. 241 Maintenance Unit	1 December 1943 – 30 December 1949		
Air Crew Refresher School	1 July 1943 – 26 July 1945	Disbanded	

== Badge ==
A badge was approved and issued for Norton in June 1954. The blazon on the badge shows two gauntlets grasping a chain being crossed by a flash of lightning. The symbolism was the signals and communications nature of the base which tested and provided mobile radar and radio convoys. The motto was test and prove.

== Post closure ==
After the RAF vacated in 1965, the site had many uses, including up to 2019 as a driver training area. In 2022, an application was made to build 270 homes on the site. It has also been used as a filming location for the TV series Full Monty.

== Notable personnel ==
- Norman Mawle, a First World War fighter ace, was in charge at RAF Norton during the early 1940s
