= Listed buildings in Holmesfield =

Holmesfield is a civil parish in the North East Derbyshire district of Derbyshire, England. The parish contains 43 listed buildings that are recorded in the National Heritage List for England. Of these, five are listed at Grade II*, the middle of the three grades, and the others are at Grade II, the lowest grade. The parish contains the village of Holmesfield, the hamlet of Cartledge, and the surrounding countryside and moorland. Most of the listed buildings are houses, cottages and associated structures, farmhouses, and farm buildings. The other listed buildings include two medieval crosses, a cross dated 1619, a church, public houses, a former toll house, a milepost, and four milestones.

== Key ==
Grade	Criteria
II*	Particularly important buildings of more than special interest
II	Buildings of national importance and special interest

== Buildings ==
Name and location	Photograph	Date	Notes	Grade
Old Cross, Fox Lane Plantation; 53.27412°N 1.56023°W		Medieval	The cross to the west of Fox Lane is in gritstone and has a roughly-shaped rectangular base. Into this is set a rectangular shaft tapering towards the head, formerly with a cross integral with the shaft but now with only fragmentary remains of the cross head.	II
Old Cross, Shillito Wood; 53.27017°N 1.55908°W		Medieval	The cross to the east of Fox Lane is in gritstone, and has a roughly-shaped rectangular base. Into this is set a tapering rectangular shaft ending in a plain cross.	II
Farm outbuildings east of Holmesfield Hall; 53.29521°N 1.52170°W	—	Early 15th century	Originally a timber framed open hall and service range, it has been altered, extended, and used for other purposes. The buildings are in sandstone, with quoins, and a Welsh slate roof with a coped gable and moulded kneelers on the south. There is an irregular T-shaped plan, with a north range of four bays containing a full height double doorway, a taking-in door, and single-light openings. The east range has four bays, doors and a window. Inside, there is a single cruck truss.	II*
Cartledge Grange; 53.29149°N 1.51603°W		15th to 16th century (probable)	A wing was added to the east of the west range in the 17th century. The house is in sandstone on a chamfered plinth, with quoins, and a roof of stone slate and tile with coped gables and moulded kneelers. There are two storeys and attics, and an L-shaped plan, consisting of a projecting gabled west range, and a three-bay wing to the east. The windows in the west range are mullioned, those in the east wing are mullioned and transomed, all with hood moulds, and in the angle is a lean-to porch.	II
Outbuilding northeast of Cartledge Hall; 53.29196°N 1.51615°W	—	16th century	The outbuilding was converted into a pair of dwellings in the 19th century. It is in sandstone, and has a stone slate roof with a coped gable on the west. There is a single storey and attics, and in the front are two unequal doorways, casement windows with chamfered surrounds, and a gabled dormer.	II
Barn opposite Middle Farm; 53.28824°N 1.53918°W	—	16th century or earlier	The barn, which has been extensively altered, remodelled, and converted for residential use, probably has a timber framed core. It is in sandstone with quoins, and has an L-shaped plan. The south front has two storeys and three bays, and contains two stable doorways and small windows, and in the east bay is a full height opening. Inside there is a full height cruck truss.	II
Unthank Hall; 53.28077°N 1.54097°W		Mid 16th century	The house is in sandstone with quoins, and a stone slate roof with coped gables and moulded kneelers. There are two storeys, a T-shaped plan, and a later gabled wing to the northeast. In the angle of the two ranges is a doorway, and the house has a mix of cross windows, casement and mullioned windows, some with hood moulds.	II*
Barn southeast of Cartledge Hall; 53.29173°N 1.51603°W	—	1567–68	The barn is in sandstone with a stone slate roof, a single storey and two bays. On the west front are two stable-type doorways with stone lintels, and the east front contains a casement windows and a single-light window with a massive lintel. In the south gable end is a square taking-in door and a dovecote with five tiers of perches. Inside the barn is one cruck truss.	II
Outbuilding southwest of Unthank Hall; 53.28047°N 1.54137°W	—	Late 16th century	Originally a threshing barn with a cruck construction, it was later extended. The barn is in sandstone on a plinth, with a stone slate roof. There is a single story with overlofts, and six bays. It contains a full height doorway with a quoined surround, two infilled rectangular openings with massive chamfered sills, and two other doorways. Inside there are five massive cruck trusses.	II*
Cartledge Hall; 53.29180°N 1.51629°W	—	1581	The house, which was extended in the 17th century, is in sandstone, and has stone slate roofs with coped gables and moulded kneelers. There are two storeys and an L-shaped plan, with a single-storey range to the east. On the south front are two gables and a doorway with a chamfered surround, and in the east range is a cart entrance opening into a recessed porch. At the rear, in the angle of the ranges, is a gabled porch and a doorway with a quoined surround. Most of the windows are mullioned or mullioned and transomed, some with hood moulds, and there is a gabled dormer. On the west side is a pair of chimneys with triangular windows and integral garderobes.	II*
Tanyard Farmhouse; 53.28347°N 1.52603°W	—	Late 16th or early 17th century	The farmhouse is in sandstone with quoins and a stone slate roof. There is a single storey and attics, and three bays, with a gabled extension in the middle of the main range, and a later extension to the east. The main doorway has a quoined surround and a massive lintel. The windows are a mix; some have single lights and others are mullioned, there are casement windows, a stair window, and two gabled dormers.	II
Holmesfield Hall; 53.29517°N 1.52234°W	—	1613	The house, which was remodelled in the 18th century, is in sandstone on a plinth, with a sill band, a moulded eaves cornice, and a hipped Welsh slate roof. There are two storeys, an L-shaped plan, and a south front of three bays. The doorway has a moulded architrave, a pulvinated frieze, and a bracketed broken pediment with an achievement and motto. Most of the windows are mullioned, and there are some sash windows. In the centre of the east front is quoining.	II*
Lady's Cross; 53.29991°N 1.59465°W		1619	The cross consists of a stone with a rectangular base, and set into it is the stump of a square shaft with chamfered edges. Around it are other pieces of the shaft lying on the ground. The base is inscribed with initials and the date.	II
Dovecote, Fanshawe Gate Hall; 53.30060°N 1.53572°W		Early 17th century	The dovecote is in sandstone with quoins, and a stone slate roof with coped gables and moulded kneelers. There are three storeys and a single bay, and on the west side it is built into a bank. On the west front are two doorways with a quoined surround, an entry overloft, and entries for nesting boxes with pitches. The north front contains a doorway above which is a blocked oeil-de-boeuf window, and a single-light opening with a moulded surround.	II
Farm outbuilding southeast of Holmesfield Hall; 53.29495°N 1.52192°W	—	Early 17th century	The outbuilding is in sandstone with quoins, and a stone slate roof with coped gables and moulded kneelers. There are two storeys and four bays. On the front is a central opening, a flight of stone steps to an upper floor opening, and mullioned windows. The rear contains two doorways with quoined surrounds and massive lintels, and mullioned windows with hood moulds.	II
Knowles Farmhouse; 53.28055°N 1.54774°W	—	Early 17th century	The farmhouse, which has been altered and extended, is in gritstone with quoins and a roof of stone slate and tile. There are two storeys and an L-shaped plan, with a front range of five bays, the left two bays slightly taller, and a rear wing. The original doorway on the front has been blocked and a circular window inserted, and to the right is a gabled porch. Near the angle of the ranges is a former doorway with a deep dated and inscribed lintel and a hood mould. The windows either have a single light, or are mullioned, some with hood moulds.	II
Gate piers, Woodthorpe Hall; 53.30497°N 1.52883°W	—	Early 17th century	The gate piers are in gritstone, they are rusticated on shallow plinths, and about 3 metres (9.8 ft) high. Each pier has a moulded drip near its midline, a projecting cornice, and a banded ball finial.	II
Cowley Farmhouse; 53.28935°N 1.49468°W	—	17th century	The farmhouse is in sandstone with quoins and a tile roof. There are two storeys and three bays. The central doorway has a quoined surround and a massive lintel. To its right is a four-light bay window with casements, and the other windows are mullioned.	II
Fanshawe Gate Hall; 53.30081°N 1.53610°W		17th century	A farmhouse in sandstone with quoins, and a stone slate roof with coped gables and moulded kneelers. There are two storeys and an L-shaped plan, with a main range of three bays, and a projecting gabled bay on the right. The central doorway has a chamfered quoined surround and a massive lintel, and the windows are mullioned.	II
Cottage southeast of Fanshawe Gate Hall; 53.30070°N 1.53570°W	—	17th century	The cottage is in sandstone with quoins, and a stone slate roof with coped gables and moulded kneelers. There are two storeys and two bays. At the west end it is built into the hillside, where it has a single upper storey. In the west gable end is a doorway with a chamfered quoined surround, a massive lintel and a hood mould, in the north front is a doorway with a quoined surround and an external staircase to a blocked doorway.	II
Gate piers and walls, Fanshawe Gate Hall; 53.30044°N 1.53607°W		17th century	Flanking the entrance to the drive are two pairs of gritstone gate piers. The northern pair is rusticated, and each has a projecting cornice, an acorn finial on a curved pyramidal stem. The southern pair is plain, and each pier has a moulded cornice supporting a cluster of four balls, on which is a second cornice and a ball finial. Joining the piers, and enclosing the garden to the east and west, are sandstone boundary walls, the east wall incorporating a doorway with a quoined surround.	II
Horsleygate Old Hall; 53.28856°N 1.53539°W		17th century	A farmhouse in sandstone with quoins, and a stone slate roof with a coped gable at the west end. There are two storeys, an L-shaped plan, a front of three bays, and a north offshut extension. The central doorway has a chamfered quoined surround, above it is a single-light windows with a chamfered surround, and the other windows are mullioned. In the east front is a doorway with a quoined surround and a massive lintel.	II
House northeast of Horsleygate Old Hall; 53.28881°N 1.53522°W	—	17th century	Outbuildings and a cottage converted into a house in 1975–77, it is in sandstone with quoins and a stone slate roof. There is an L-shaped plan, the main range with two storeys and seven bays, and the projecting wing on the left with two storeys and a basement, and two bays. In the main range are three doorways with quoined surround, one converted into a window. Most of the windows are replacements, there are mullioned windows in the wing and at the rear, and the slit vents have been glazed. In the wing is a double opening with a quoined surround, now glazed, and in the gable end is a doorway with a quoined surround with a massive lintel under a relieving arch.	II
House southeast of Unthank Hall; 53.28061°N 1.54064°W	—	17th century	A stable extended and converted into a house in 1985, it is in sandstone with quoins, and a stone slate roof with coped gables and moulded kneelers. There are two storeys, two bays, and a lean-to on the southwest gable. The doorway has a chamfered quoined surround, a massive lintel, and a hood mould. Most of the windows are mullioned, and in the northeast gable end are three tiers of perches, and entry holes for a former dovecote.	II
Woodthorpe Hall; 53.30483°N 1.52882°W		17th century	The house is in sandstone with quoins, a continuous string course above the ground and upper floor windows, and a stone slate roof with coped gables and moulded kneelers. There are two storeys and attics, an L-shaped plan, and an east front of five bays. In the centre is a doorway, and to the north is a blocked former doorway with a quoined surround and a massive lintel converted into a window. Some of the windows have single lights, some are mullioned, and there are gabled attic dormers. The south front has five bays, and contains a gabled porch with a Tudor-arched lintel. The north front contains an inserted two-storey porch moved from elsewhere, with a rusticated surround, and a doorway with a cambered head and a massive keystone.	II
Outbuildings northeast and east of Cartledge Grange; 53.29153°N 1.51552°W	—	Late 17th century	The outbuildings are in sandstone with quoins and stone slate roofs, and form an L-shaped plan with west and south ranges. The west range contains a cart entry, five stable doors, all with substantial lintels, and three upper floor openings. In the south range are doorways and a two-light mullioned window, and the south gable end has double doors, above which are two-light windows pointed with pointed heads.	II
Cordwell Farmhouse; 53.28426°N 1.53245°W		Late 17th century	The farmhouse is in sandstone with quoins, and a stone slate roof with coped gables and moulded kneelers. There are two storeys, a double depth plan and three bays. The central doorway has a rusticated architrave, a rectangular fanlight, a pulvinated frieze, and a moulded cornice, and the windows are sashes.	II
Outbuilding northeast of Fanshawe Gate Hall; 53.30106°N 1.53581°W	—	Late 17th century	The farm outbuilding is in sandstone with quoins, and a stone slate roof with coped gables and moulded kneelers. There are two storeys and six bays. The building contains a full height opening and three doorways, all with quoined surrounds, and the doorways have massive lintels. In the upper floor is a taking-in door, and at the rear are slit vents.	II
Farm outbuilding south of Unthank Hall; 53.28047°N 1.54102°W	—	Late 17th century	The farm outbuilding is in sandstone with quoins, a stone slate roof, two storeys and two bays. The building contains two doorways with massive jambs and heads, stable doors, and two upper floor openings. At the northeast is a lean-to with a cart opening.	II
Outbuilding southwest of Unthank Hall; 53.28071°N 1.54122°W	—	Late 17th century	The outbuilding is in sandstone with quoins and a stone slate roof. There is a single storey, two bays, and a rear lean-to. The building contains a central doorway with a quoined surround and a stable door, and a cart opening with a timber lintel.	II.
Fox Lane Farmhouse; 53.28087°N 1.55440°W	—	1691	The farmhouse is in sandstone with quoins, and a stone slate roof with coped gables and moulded kneelers. There are two storeys and attics, five bays, and a single-storey extension to the west. In the centre is a doorway with a quoined surround and a massive moulded lintel, initialled and dated. Above it is a single-light window with a moulded surround, and most of the other windows are mullioned. Over the ground floor windows is a continuous hood mould, stepped up over the doorway.	II.
Middle Farmhouse; 53.28047°N 1.54102°W	—	1697	The farmhouse, which has been altered and extended, is in sandstone, and has a stone slate roof and gables, one of which is coped with moulded kneelers. There is an L-shaped plan, consisting of a main range with two storeys and three bays, and a single-storey bay to the north. In each part is a doorway with a quoined surround and a massive dated and initialled lintel. Most of the windows are mullioned with hood moulds.	II
St Swithin's Church; 53.29522°N 1.52040°W		1727	The church was altered in 1826, the chancel was added in 1898, and it was enlarged in 1961–63, when a porch was also added. The church is built in sandstone with a slate roof, and consists of a nave, a south porch, a chancel, and a west tower. The tower has two stages separated by bands, and the lower stage contains a window with a chamfered surround and a pointed arch. In the upper stage is a clock face, and above is an embattled parapet with crocketed pinnacles and a dated plaque. Along the nave are three tall round-headed windows.	II
Barn with dovecote east of Cartledge Hall; 53.29185°N 1.51593°W	—	18th century	The barn is in sandstone with quoins and a stone slate roof. In the east front is a cart entrance and triangular windows and vents. The south gable end has a cart entrance and round-arched windows with chamfered surrounds, and in the gable is a six-tier dovecote with perches. The north gable end contains a blocked doorway, a square taking-in hole, and round-arched windows.	II
Former Robin Hood Inn; 53.29568°N 1.53930°W		Late 18th century	The former public house is in sandstone with quoins and a Welsh slate roof. There are two storeys, a front range of three bays, and a gabled rear range. The central doorway has a massive surround, above it is a narrow single-light opening, and the other windows are sashes with flush surrounds.	II
Milestone between Saltersitch Bridge and Barbrook Bridge; 53.29656°N 1.57750°W		Late 18th to early 19th century	The milestone is on the south side of the B6054 road. It consists of a rectangular flagstone with rounded shoulders set into the ground, and inscribed with the distances to Gleadless and Calver.	II
Milestone near the junction of the A625 road 53.30489°N 1.59448°W		Late 18th to early 19th century	The milestone is on the southwest side of the B6054 road. It consists of a rectangular flagstone with rounded shoulders set into the ground, and inscribed with the distances to Gleadless and Calver.	II
The Peacock Inn; 53.29833°N 1.56111°W		Early 19th century	The public house is in gritstone with a stone slate roof. There are two storeys and two ranges. The right range is taller, with three bays, and a single-storey extension to the right containing a doorway, and the windows are two-light casements, the lights with pointed heads. The left range is lower with four bays, it has a projecting gabled wing, and the windows in the ground floor have pointed arched heads. In the gable end of the wing is a blocked circular opening.	II
Former toll house 53.29828°N 1.56040°W		Early 19th century	The former toll house is in gritstone with quoins and a stone slate roof. There are two storeys and two bays. On the front and left return are flat-roofed rectangular bay windows with parapets, the former incorporating a doorway. The other windows are casements.	II
Thickwood Lodge; 53.30286°N 1.55843°W	—	Mid 19th century	The lodge is in gritstone, with quoins, and a stone slate roof with coped gables and moulded kneelers. There are two storeys and an attic, a square plan, and one bay on each front. Each bay is gabled, those at the front and rear with finials, and there is a single-storey flat-roofed extension to the northwest. The windows are mullioned with three lights, in the attic are small windows with pointed heads, and above the ground and upper floor windows are continuous moulded string courses. In front of the doorway is a gabled porch.	II
Milepost near Thickwood Lodge; 53.30255°N 1.55693°W		Mid 19th century	The milepost is on the east side of the A621 road. It is in cast iron, and has a triangular section, a dished upper part, and a curved head. On the lower faces are inscribed the distances to Baslow, Bakewell and Sheffield.	II
Milestone near the Peacock Inn; 53.29733°N 1.55290°W		Mid 19th century	The milestone is on the southwest side of the B6054 road. It consists of a rectangular flagstone set into the ground, and inscribed with the distances to Gleadless and Calver.	II
Milestone near the former Robin Hood Inn; 53.29550°N 1.52963°W		Mid 19th century	The milestone is on the south side of the B6054 road. It consists of a rectangular flagstone set into the ground, and inscribed with the distances to Gleadless and Calver.	II
