= Dronfield Civic Hall =

Municipal building in Dronfield, Derbyshire, England

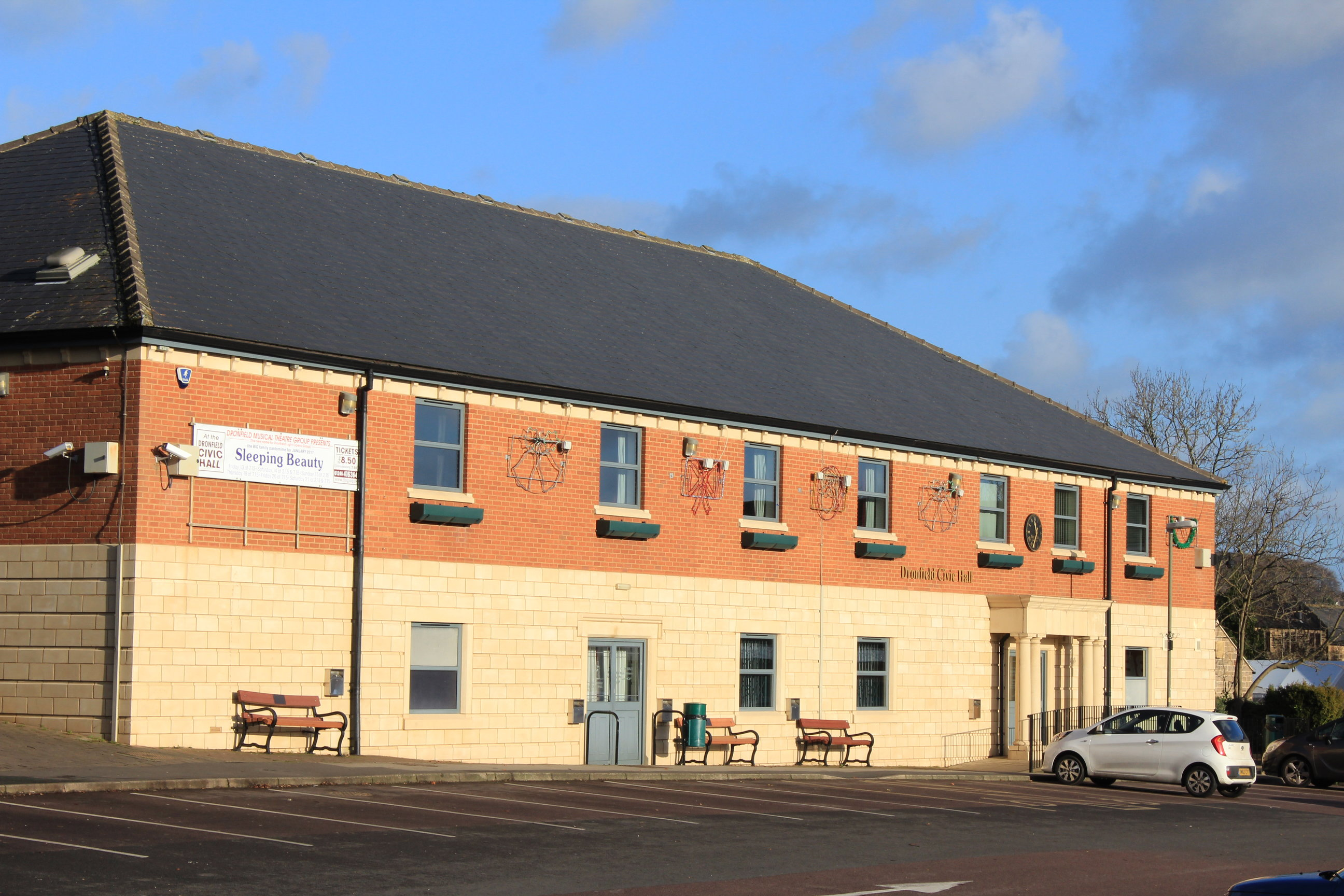
- The building in 2016

- Shown in Derbyshire
- 53.3016°N 1.4756°W
- Location: Civic Centre, Dronfield

History
- Built: 1999

Site notes
- Architectural style: Modern style

Dronfield Civic Hall is a municipal building in the Civic Centre in Dronfield, a town in Derbyshire, in England. The building accommodates the offices and meeting place of Dronfield Town Council and also operates as a community events venue.

== History ==
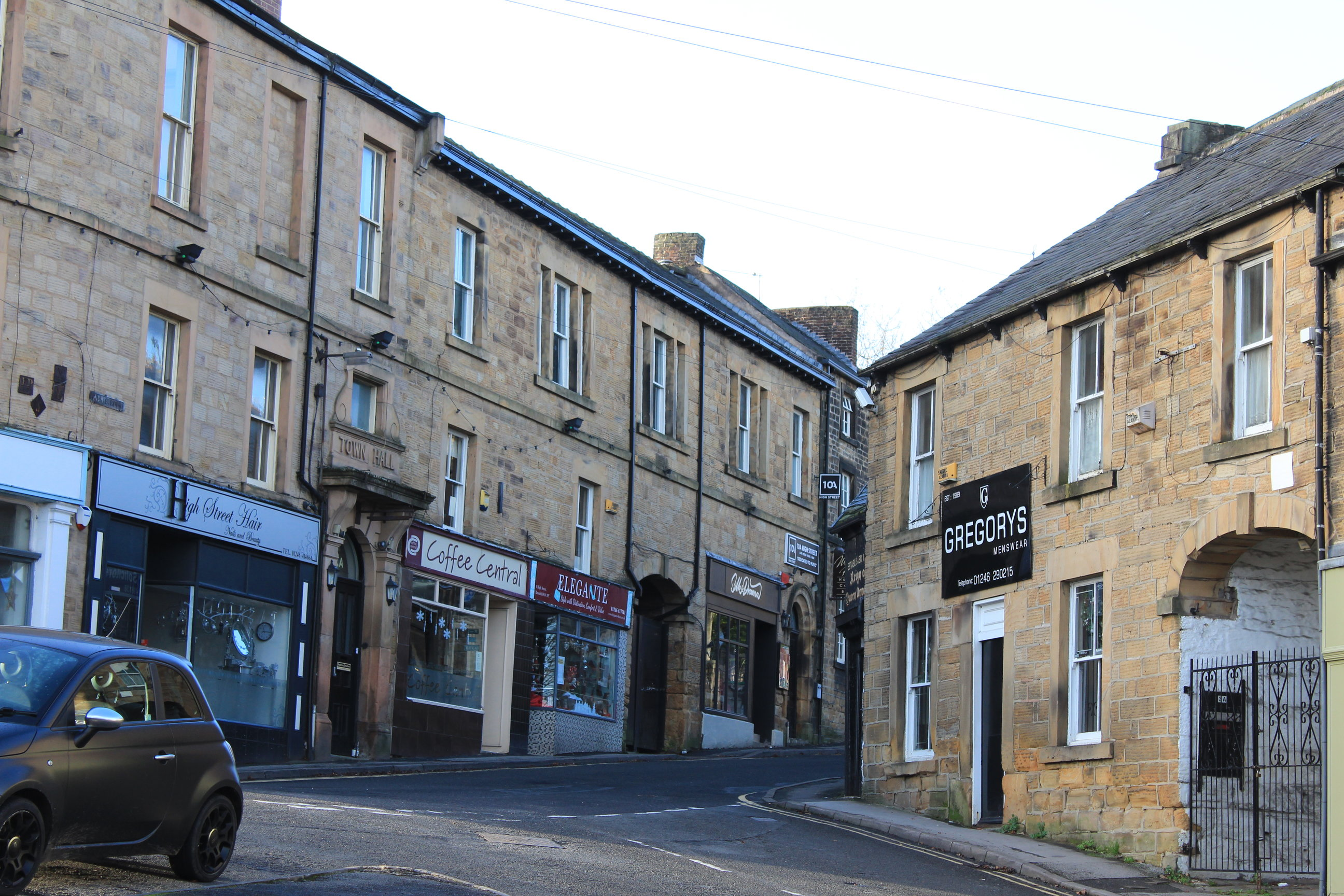
The former town hall (left) at No. 2A High Street

Following significant population growth, largely associated with the coal mining industry, a local board of health was established in Dronfield in 1861. The local board decided to commission modest offices abutting the south side of the High Street close to the corner with Church Street. The three-storey structure, which became known as the Town Hall Buildings, formed part of a terrace of properties designed in the neoclassical style, built in stone and completed in 1877. It featured an elaborate entrance with a round-headed opening flanked by pilasters and brackets supporting a cornice and an entablature inscribed with the words "Town Hall". It was used as a magistrates' court, a mechanics' institute, and a meeting venue. The ground floor has since been converted to retail use.

After the local board was succeeded by Dronfield Urban District Council in 1894, the council initially used the Town Hall Buildings for offices, but in the 1930s, sought larger premises and chose to acquire Dronfield Manor, which dated back to the early 18th century. The manor continued to serve as the offices of Dronfield Urban District Council for another four decades, but ceased to be the local seat of government when the enlarged North East Derbyshire District Council was formed in 1974. After Dronfield Town Council was formed, shortly thereafter, it established its offices in council-owned property at No. 25 High Street.

Meanwhile, also in the 1970s, the council developed the area around Eldon Croft at the north end of Farwater Lane. Various buildings, including a candle maker, a cobbler's and public house known as The Mason's Arms were demolished to make way for a small square surrounded by shops: this became known as Dronfield Civic Centre. As part of Dronfield Civic Centre, a small single-storey civil hall was erected on the north side of the square. It was a timber-clad building with a recessed entrance facing onto the Dronfield Civic Centre Approach Road. It featured a small rockery in front of the entrance.

In the mid-1990s, it was decided to demolish the old civic hall, and to redevelop the north side of Dronfield Civic Centre to create a more substantial community events venue. The new building was designed in the neoclassical style, built in red brick with stone dressings and was officially opened on 14 December 1999. The design involved an asymmetrical main frontage of seven bays facing onto Dronfield Civic Centre. The fifth bay featured a portico formed by two pairs of Doric order columns supporting an entablature. The ground floor was faced in sandstone and most of the bays on both floors were fenestrated with casement windows. Internally, the building contained offices for the town council and a council chamber, along with a large assembly hall capable of seating up to 210 people. The assembly hall subsequently became a popular venue for concerts and theatrical performances.
