= Harry Maskrey =

English footballer

Personal information
- Full name: Harry Mart Maskrey
- Date of birth: 8 October 1880
- Place of birth: Dronfield, England
- Date of death: 21 April 1927 (aged 46)
- Place of death: Derby, England
- Position: Goalkeeper

Senior career*
Years	Team	Apps	(Gls)
1898–1902	Ripley Athletic	?	(?)
1902–1909	Derby County	197	(0)
1909–1911	Bradford City	41	(0)
1911	Ripley Town	?	(?)
1911–1913	Stalybridge Celtic	?	(?)
1913–1914	Mansfield Mechanics	?	(?)
1919–1920	British Cellulose	?	(?)
1920–1921	Derby County	5	(0)
1921–1922	Burton All Saints	?	(?)
Total		243	(0)

International career
1908	England	1	(0)
- * Club domestic league appearances and goals

Harry Mart Maskrey (8 October 1880 – 21 April 1927) was an English footballer who played at both professional and international levels as a goalkeeper.

== Personal life ==
Maskrey was born in Dronfield and died in Derby.

== Career ==
=== Club career ===
Maskrey played club football for Ripley Athletic, Derby County, Bradford City, Ripley Town, Stalybridge Celtic, Mansfield Mechanics, British Cellulose and Burton All Saints.

=== International career ===
Maskrey earned one cap for the England national side in 1908.
