= St John the Baptist's Church, Dronfield =

St John the Baptist’s Church, Dronfield
- St John the Baptist’s Church, Dronfield (Photo by Dave Bevis)
- St John the Baptist’s Church, Dronfield
- 53°18′5.400″N 1°28′19.092″W
- Location: Dronfield
- Country: England
- Denomination: Church of England

History
- Dedication: St John the Baptist

Architecture
- Heritage designation: Grade I listed

Administration
- Diocese: Diocese of Derby
- Archdeaconry: Chesterfield
- Deanery: Chesterfield
- Parish: Dronfield with Holmesfield

St John the Baptist’s Church, Dronfield is a Grade I listed parish church in the Church of England in Dronfield, Derbyshire.

== History ==
The church dates from the late 13th century. It was altered in the mid 16th century, and had extensive repairs around 1819.

There were further alterations and restoration in 1855 by the architects Flockton and Son of Sheffield at a cost of £1,300. New roofs covered with lead were placed over the aisles. The nave roof was opened and the ceiling removed. New floors were laid and the seating was renewed. The west gallery was removed and the west window was partially filled with stained glass in memory of Mr Butterman of Dronfield. The Bishop of Lichfield reopened the church on Thursday 26 April 1855.

New stained glass was inserted in the east window in 1887 paid for by William Parker of Whittington Hall. F. R. Shields of London designed it and it was highly praised by Edward Burne-Jones.

== Memorials ==
- Thomas Godfred (d. 1399) and his brother Richard
- John Fanshawe (d. 1580) and his wife Margaret
- Sir Richard Barley

=== Churchyard ===
The churchyard contains war graves of two British Army soldiers of World War I.

== Parish status ==
The church is in a joint parish with

- St Andrew’s Church, Gosforth Valley
- St Philip’s Church, Holmesdale
- St Mary’s Church, Unstone
- St Swithin’s Church, Holmesfield

== Organ ==
The church contains an organ by Alexander Buckingham dating from 1830 that has been restored and extended several times. A specification of the organ can be found on the National Pipe Organ Register.
