= Apperknowle =

Village in Derbyshire, England

Coordinates: 53.301°N 1.431°W

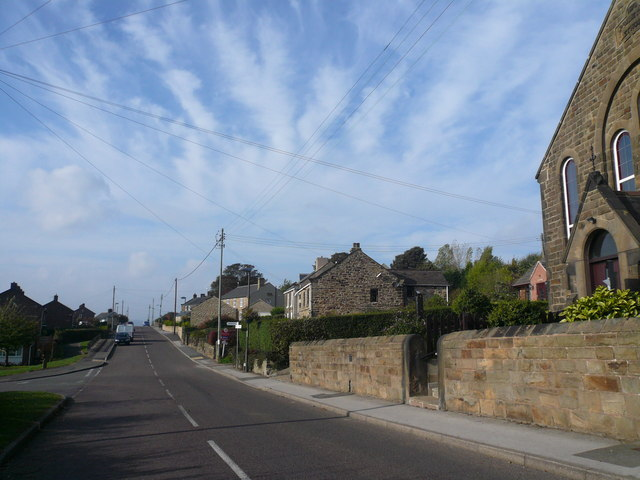
- Apperknowle.

- Location within Derbyshire
- OS grid reference: SK380783
- Shire county: Derbyshire
- Region: East Midlands
- Country: England
- Sovereign state: United Kingdom
- Post town: Dronfield
- Postcode district: S18
- Police: Derbyshire
- Fire: Derbyshire
- Ambulance: East Midlands

Apperknowle is a village in Derbyshire, England. The village is located on the Southwestern slopes of a flat-topped ridge at about 200 m above sea level. The village overlooks the town of Dronfield and the villages of Unstone (where the population is listed) and Unstone Green in the valley bottom, where the River Drone and the Midland Railway are located. Above the village is a small grass airstrip that used to belong to British Steel, and is now used for private planes with a couple of new hangars built in the 1980s.

Apperknowle gains its name from the Old English word Apelknol, meaning 'Apple Tree Hill'. Set up on the hills it looks down upon Dronfield and the Drone Valley and offers some panoramic views across the countryside towards the Peak District.

There is also a local Methodist Church, which was opened in 1879 to replace an earlier building. It is the only place of worship in the village and often hosts visiting preachers from other local churches in and around the Sheffield area.

The villages used to have 3 pubs and a post office, but only 1 pub survives now. Opposite the "Travellers Rest" pub is a cricket pitch (home to Apperknowle Cricket Club) that slopes down the valley and has a good view of the surrounding Derbyshire countryside.

There is a Victorian school house, which used to be the local primary school until it was shut down in July 2008.

There is no significant industrial activity in the village now. It acts as a commuter village for the local towns and the Chesterfield and Sheffield areas. Originally the village grew from miners working the various coal outcrops, and small farms. There is evidence of old pits in the surrounding woods, and several old spoil heaps.
