= Coal Aston =

Village in Derbyshire, England

Coordinates: 53.312°N 1.458°W

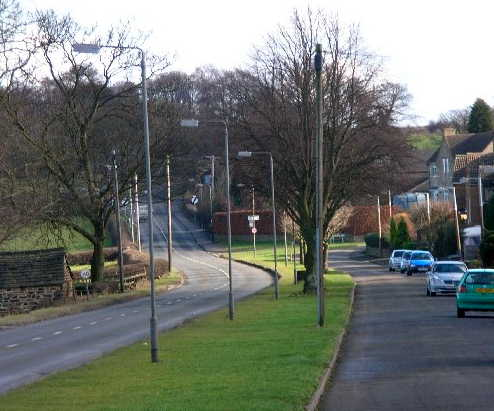
- Looking east along Eckington Road in the direction of Eckington

- Location within Derbyshire
- OS grid reference: SK362795
- Civil parish: Dronfield
- District: North East Derbyshire
- Shire county: Derbyshire
- Region: East Midlands
- Country: England
- Sovereign state: United Kingdom
- Post town: DRONFIELD
- Postcode district: S18
- Dialling code: 01246
- Police: Derbyshire
- Fire: Derbyshire
- Ambulance: East Midlands
- UK Parliament: North East Derbyshire

Coal Aston is a village in the civil parish of Dronfield, in the North East Derbyshire district, in the county of Derbyshire, England. It is by the town of Dronfield.

== Geography ==
Coal Aston sits on a ridge overlooking Sheffield and Dronfield. To the south there is Frith Wood, which is made up of mixed woodland rich in many species of fauna and flora and is thought to be an ancient wood. The wood is now a conservation area and although it is spelt Frith Wood on, for example, Ordnance Survey maps, many locals call it Firth wood as in the neighbouring Firthwood Road. The name Coal Aston is due to the number of walk-in coal mines in the area, finally closing in 1938. There are many stone-built houses and terraces dating back to the mining era during the 19th century. The last mine, Sicklebrook Colliery on Sicklebrook Lane (off Eckington Road), closed in 1938.. The large Victorian village school has now been converted into a private house. During World War II the village was the site of a prisoner-of-war camp.

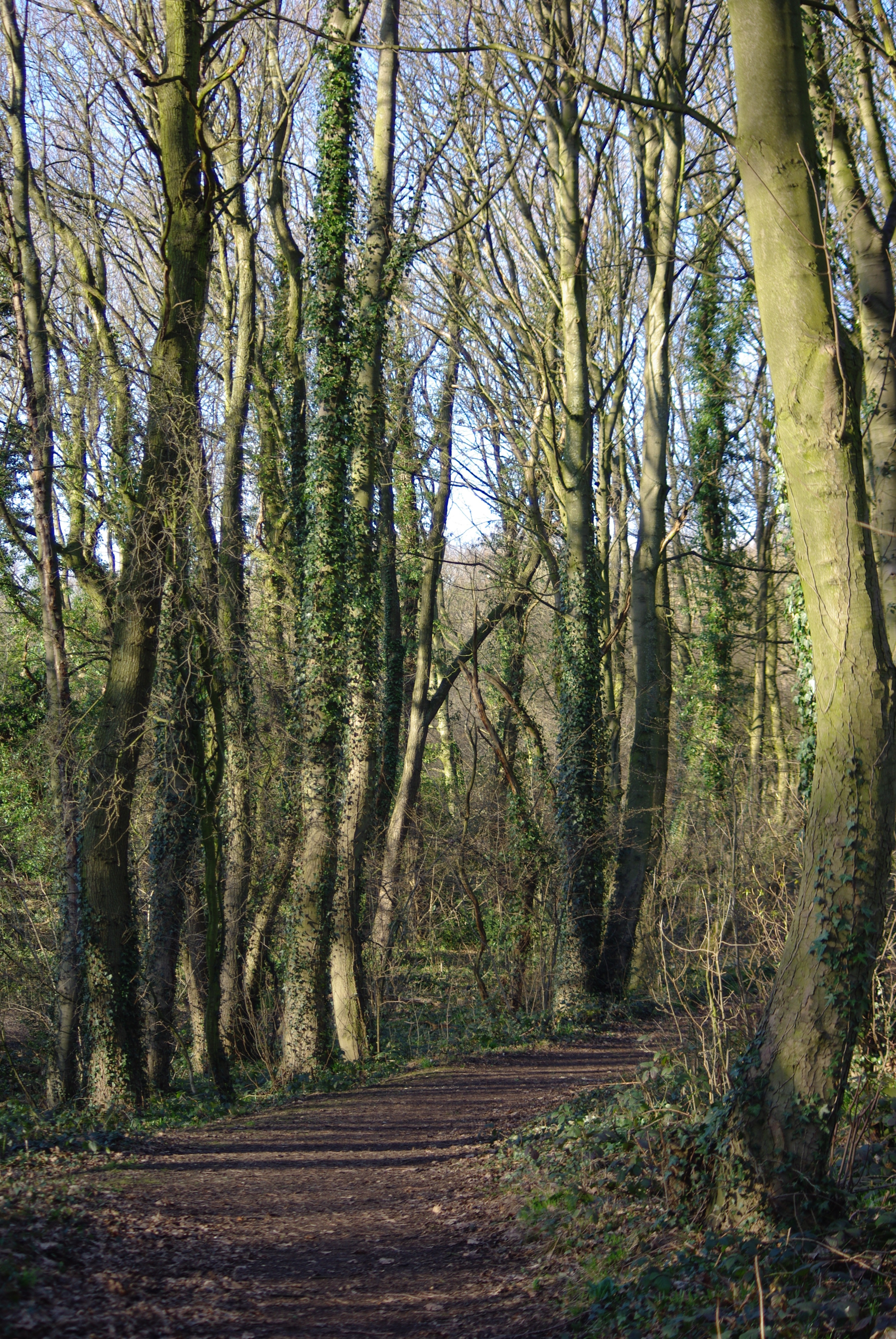
Southern entrance to Firth Wood, late Winter

== History ==
Coal Aston was formerly a township in the parish of Dronfield, in 1866 Coal Aston became a separate civil parish, on 1 April 1935 the parish was abolished and merged with Dronfield and Eckington. In 1931 the parish had a population of 858.
