= Marsh Lane, Derbyshire =

Village in Derbyshire, England

Coordinates: 53.308039°N 1.391859°W

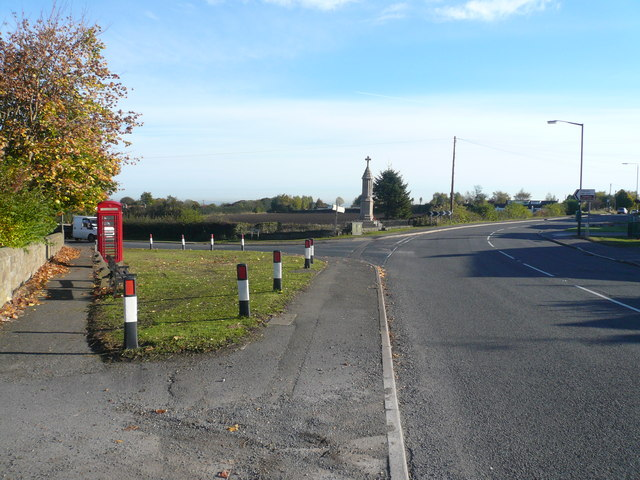
Marsh Lane: junction of Ford Road with Main Road, showing war memorial

Marsh Lane village is located in the civil parish of Eckington in North-East Derbyshire, England. It is 6 miles north east of Chesterfield. In 2011 the village had a population of 895.

== Schools ==
Marsh Lane has a primary school which was built in the 1870s. It also has a nursery for children aged 3–4 years of age.

== Culture ==
As the village is located near the border with South Yorkshire, it has its own accent: a cross between the Sheffield (as opposed to Yorkshire) and Chesterfield accents, Chesterfield being the predominant.
