= Wentworth (constituency) =

UK Parliament constituency (1983–2010)

Coordinates: 53.475°N 1.375°W

- Former county constituency for the House of Commons
- Boundary of Wentworth in South Yorkshire for the 2005 general election

- Location of South Yorkshire within England
- County: South Yorkshire
- Major settlements: Wath-upon-Dearne, Swinton, Rawmarsh, Bramley, Wickersley

1983–2010
- Seats: One
- Created from: Dearne Valley, Rother Valley
- Replaced by: Wentworth and Dearne

1918–1950
- Created from: Barnsley, Doncaster, Hallamshire, Holmfirth
- Replaced by: Dearne Valley, Don Valley and Hemsworth

Wentworth was a parliamentary constituency in South Yorkshire. Originally created in 1918 and was abolished in 1950, the name was revived when a new constituency was created from 1983 to 2010. Throughout its history, Wentworth was a safe seat for the Labour Party.

== Boundaries ==
1918–1950: The Urban Districts of Bolton-upon-Dearne, Darfield, Dodworth, Hoyland Nether, Thurnscoe, Wath-upon-Dearne, Wombwell, and Worsborough; and parts of the Rural Districts of Barnsley, and Rotherham.

1983–2010: The Metropolitan Borough of Rotherham wards of Bramley, Ravenfield and Wickersley; Brampton, Melton and Wentworth; Dalton; Hooton Roberts and Thrybergh; Rawmarsh East; Rawmarsh West; Swinton; and Wath.

At its abolition in 2010, Wentworth constituency consisted of the northern part of the Borough of Rotherham and part of the Borough of Barnsley, and was bordered by the constituencies of Barnsley East and Mexborough, Barnsley West and Penistone, Don Valley, Rotherham, Rother Valley, and Sheffield Hillsborough.

=== Boundary review ===
Following their review of parliamentary representation in South Yorkshire, the Boundary Commission for England created an extended Wentworth constituency to include electoral wards from the Borough of Barnsley. This new Wentworth and Dearne constituency was fought for the first time at the 2010 general election.

== Members of Parliament ==
=== MPs 1918–1950 ===
Election	Member	Party
1918	George Harry Hirst	Labour
1933 by-election	Wilfred Paling	Labour
1950	Constituency abolished	

=== MPs 1983–2010 ===
Election	Member	Party
1983	Peter Hardy	Labour
1997	John Healey	Labour
2010	Constituency abolished: see Wentworth and Dearne	

== Elections ==
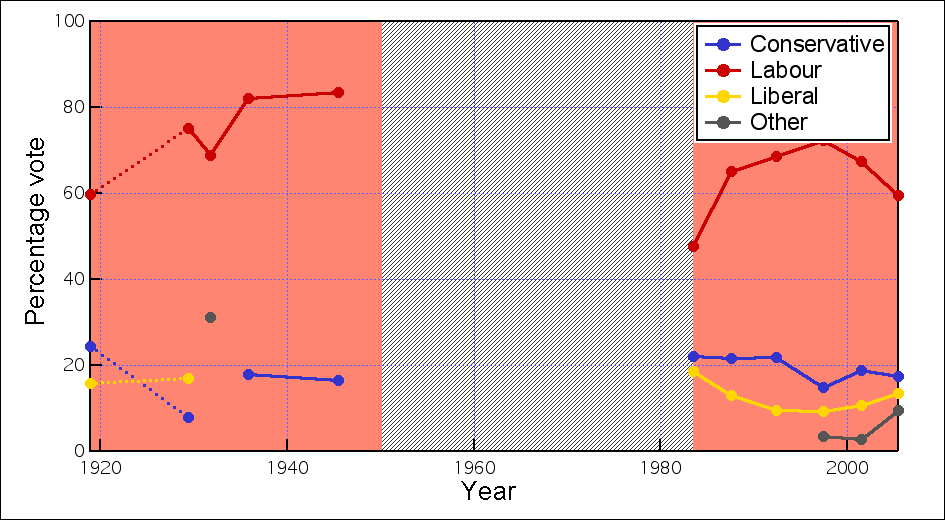
Election results for Wentworth, 1918–1950 & 1983–2005.

=== Elections in the 2000s ===
General election 2005: Wentworth
Party	Candidate	Votes	%	±%
Labour	John Healey	21,225	59.6	−7.9
Conservative	Mark Hughes	6,169	17.3	−1.5
Liberal Democrats	Keith Orrell	4,800	13.5	+2.7
BNP	Jonathan Pygott	1,798	5.0	New
UKIP	John Wilkinson	1,604	4.5	+1.6
Majority		15,056	42.3	−6.4
Turnout		35,596	56.0	+3.2
Labour hold		Swing	−3.2	

General election 2001: Wentworth
Party	Candidate	Votes	%	±%
Labour	John Healey	22,798	67.5	−4.8
Conservative	Mike Roberts	6,349	18.8	+3.8
Liberal Democrats	David Wildgoose	3,652	10.8	+1.5
UKIP	John Wilkinson	979	2.9	New
Majority		16,449	48.7	−8.6
Turnout		33,778	52.8	−12.5
Labour hold		Swing		

=== Elections in the 1990s ===
General election 1997: Wentworth
Party	Candidate	Votes	%	±%
Labour	John Healey	30,225	72.3	+3.8
Conservative	Karl Hamer	6,266	15.0	−6.8
Liberal Democrats	James Charters	3,867	9.3	−0.3
Referendum	Andrew Battley	1,423	3.4	New
Majority		23,959	57.3	+10.6
Turnout		41,781	65.3	−8.7
Labour hold		Swing	+5.3	

General election 1992: Wentworth
Party	Candidate	Votes	%	±%
Labour	Peter Hardy	32,939	68.5	+3.3
Conservative	Michael J. Brennan	10,490	21.8	0.0
Liberal Democrats	Christine Roderick	4,629	9.6	−3.4
Majority		22,449	46.7	+3.3
Turnout		48,058	74.0	+1.4
Labour hold		Swing	+1.7	

=== Elections in the 1980s ===
General election 1987: Wentworth
Party	Candidate	Votes	%	±%
Labour	Peter Hardy	30,205	65.2	+6.1
Conservative	William Hague	10,113	21.8	−0.4
SDP	David Elgin	6,031	13.0	−5.7
Majority		20,092	43.4	+6.5
Turnout		46,349	72.6	+2.9
Labour hold		Swing		

General election 1983: Wentworth
Party	Candidate	Votes	%	±%
Labour	Peter Hardy	27,498	59.1	
Conservative	Richard Norton	9,603	22.2	
SDP	Max Tildsley	8,082	18.7	
Majority		15,935	36.9	
Turnout		45,183	69.7	
Labour win (new seat)				

=== Elections in the 1940s ===
General election 1945: Wentworth
Party	Candidate	Votes	%	±%
Labour	Wilfred Paling	44,080	83.6	+1.5
Conservative	Aymée Lavender Gandar Dower	8,670	16.4	−1.5
Majority		35,410	67.2	+3.0
Turnout		52,750	78.3	+14.1
Labour hold		Swing		

=== Elections in the 1930s ===
General election 1935: Wentworth
Party	Candidate	Votes	%	±%
Labour	Wilfred Paling	37,471	82.1	+13.3
Conservative	Arthur Gerard Hargreaves	8,167	17.9	−13.3
Majority		29,304	64.2	+26.6
Turnout		45,638	64.2	−12.9
Labour hold		Swing		

1933 Wentworth by-election
Party	Candidate	Votes	%	±%
Labour	Wilfred Paling	Unopposed		
Labour hold				

General election 1931: Wentworth
Party	Candidate	Votes	%	±%
Labour	George Hirst	31,861	68.8	−6.3
National Liberal	Charlotte Isabel Hilyer	14,462	31.2	+23.3
Majority		17,399	37.6	−20.5
Turnout		46,323	77.1	−3.2
Labour hold		Swing		

=== Elections in the 1920s ===
General election 1929: Wentworth
Party	Candidate	Votes	%	±%
Labour	George Hirst	35,276	75.1	N/A
Liberal	Philip Brady Nicholson	7,955	17.0	N/A
Unionist	Benjamin Hubert Oates	3,684	7.9	N/A
Majority		27,321	58.1	N/A
Turnout		46,915	80.3	N/A
Labour hold		Swing	N/A	

General election 1924: Wentworth
Party	Candidate	Votes	%	±%
Labour	George Hirst	Unopposed		
Labour hold				

General election 1923: Wentworth
Party	Candidate	Votes	%	±%
Labour	George Hirst	Unopposed		
Labour hold				

General election 1922: Wentworth
Party	Candidate	Votes	%	±%
Labour	George Hirst	Unopposed		
Labour hold				

=== Elections in the 1910s ===
General election 1918: Wentworth
Party		Candidate	Votes	%	±%
	Labour	George Hirst	13,029	59.8	
C	Unionist	Thomas Wilfred Howe Mitchell	5,315	24.4	
	Liberal	Frederick Booth	3,453	15.8	
Majority			7,714	35.4	
Turnout			21,797	60.5	
	Labour win (new seat)				
C indicates candidate endorsed by the coalition government.

== See also ==
- List of parliamentary constituencies in South Yorkshire

== Sources ==
- Guardian Unlimited Politics (Election results from 1992 to the present)
- http://www.psr.keele.ac.uk/ (Election results from 1951 to the present)
