= Steve Richards =

British TV presenter and political columnist

Steve Richards (born 6 June 1960) is a British TV presenter and political columnist, who has written columns for the Guardian, Independent and New Statesman, of which he was political editor for a time.

He regularly presents Radio 4's Week in Westminster and hosts a podcast and a one-man show, Rock N Roll Politics.

Richards has also authored several books on politics and British political history, including The Prime Ministers We Never Had and The Prime Ministers, both of which received critical acclaim.

His most recent work, Turning Points: Crisis and Change in Modern Britain, from 1945 to Truss, was published by Macmillan in 2023.

== Early life ==
Richards was educated at Christ's College, formerly a state grammar school, in Finchley, North London, and graduated in history at the University of York in 1981, before securing a place on a journalism course at the London College of Printing.

== Journalism career ==
Richards worked in local radio and regional TV in Newcastle, before becoming a BBC political correspondent in 1990. In 1996, he became Political Editor for the New Statesman while continuing to present on radio and TV. In 2000, he became a political columnist at The Independent and Independent on Sunday.

Richards presented GMTV's The Sunday Programme, BBC Two's Despatch Box and BBC Radio 4's Week in Westminster.

In early 2017, he presented a series of television talks on modern Prime Ministers entitled Leadership Reflections, with episodes about Harold Wilson, Margaret Thatcher, Tony Blair, Gordon Brown, and David Cameron, broadcast on BBC Parliament.

In late 2017, Richards presented another series of reflections, this time on major political "Turning Points". There are six episodes and they are about the following topics: the 1979 general election; the rise of the SDP; the death of John Smith; the 2008 financial crisis; the Brexit referendum; and the 2017 general election. They were first broadcast on BBC Parliament from 7–12 November.

In 2018, he presented another series of episodes for BBC Parliament, entitled Reflections: The Prime Ministers We Never Had, which profiled Rab Butler, Denis Healey, Tony Benn, Roy Jenkins, Neil Kinnock, Michael Heseltine, Kenneth Clarke, Michael Portillo, and David Miliband and Ed Miliband.

== Personal life ==
Richards' son, Jake Richards, is the Labour MP for Rother Valley, elected in the 2024 general election. His daughter, Amy Richards, is a Special Advisor (SpAd) to the Home Secretary, Yvette Cooper, and is married to Gregor Poynton, Labour MP for Livingston since 2024.
