= Greg Stafford (politician) =

British politician

Gregory Stafford MP
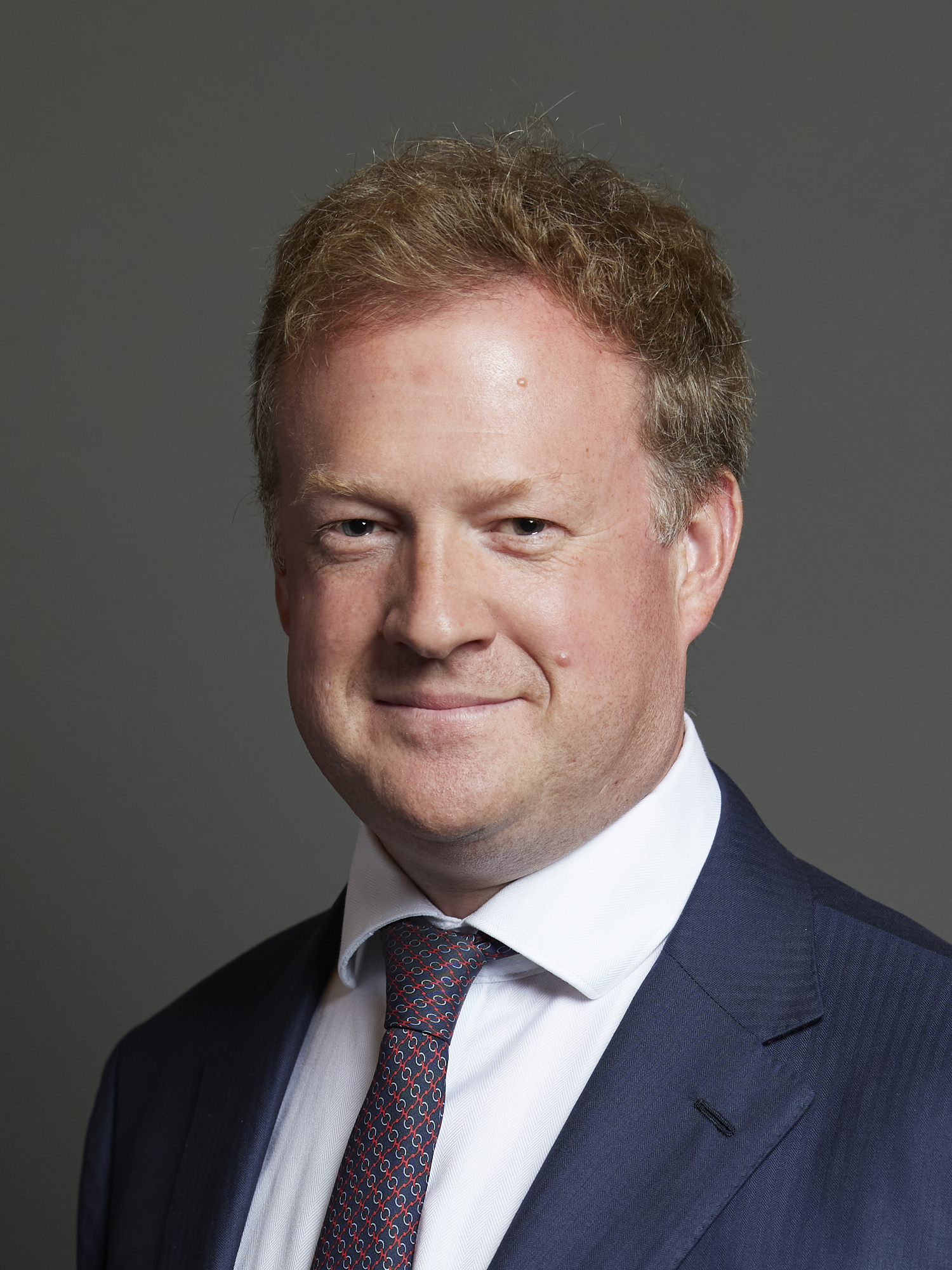
- Official portrait, 2024

Shadow Minister for Health and Social Care
- Incumbent
- Assumed office 2 September 2026
- Leader: Kemi Badenoch
- Preceded by: Luke Evans

Shadow Comptroller of HM Royal Household (Senior Whip)
- Incumbent
- Assumed office 2 September 2026
- Preceded by: Mike Wood

Member of Parliament for Farnham and Bordon
- Incumbent
- Assumed office 4 July 2024
- Preceded by: Constituency established
- Majority: 1,349 (2.5%)

Personal details
- Party: Conservative
- Relatives: Alexander Stafford (brother)
- Education: St Benedict's School, Ealing
- Alma mater: St Peter's College, Oxford
- Website: Official website

Gregory James Stafford is a British Conservative Party politician who has served as the Member of Parliament for Farnham and Bordon since 2024. He has been a Shadow Parliamentary Under-Secretary of State for Health and Social Care and a Senior Opposition Whip since September 2026.

Stafford served as councillor in the London Borough of Ealing from 2007 to 2024, and was both leader of the Conservatives group and Leader of the Opposition from 2014 until 2022. He was Chairman of Conservative Future in West London.

His younger brother, Alexander Stafford, served as Conservative MP for Rother Valley from 2019 to 2024.

== Early life and education ==
Born in Queen Charlotte's and Chelsea Hospital, he attended St Benedict's School, a Catholic independent school, and later studied modern history at St Peter's College, Oxford.

He has familial ties to his seat, with his father's family originally coming from Haslemere, a town in which his grandparents owned the former Stafford's Sweet Shop.

Stafford's mother's family immigrated from Ukraine after the Second World War to Witley, located in the neighbouring constituency of Godalming and Ash.

== Early career ==
After he completed his studies at Oxford University in 2004, Stafford worked in the Parliamentary office of a former Shadow Home Office Minister for nearly four years. During this time, he also supported the All Party Parliamentary Group for the Holy See and was on the committee for the Conservative Friends of Gibraltar.

In 2008, Stafford began working as a public affairs professional in the healthcare industry, initially for the Royal College of Occupational Therapists before joining the General Dental Council in June 2012.

He later went on to join the national NHS England programme known as Getting It Right First Time (GIRFT). As his most recent role before his election as a Member of Parliament, Stafford was the programme's Director of Policy and Engagement until July 2024. According to the GIRFT website, its "methodology has been applied across more than 40 surgical and medical specialities", with a focus on improving clinician-to-clinician cooperation and sharing of good practice.

== Parliamentary career ==
In the 2024 general election, Stafford was elected as the first Parliamentary representative for the Farnham and Bordon constituency. He was soon appointed to the Opposition Whips' Office by Kemi Badenoch in November 2024.

During the 2026 British shadow cabinet reshuffle, Stafford was appointed as Shadow Parliamentary Under-Secretary of State for Health and Social Care and Shadow Comptroller of HM Royal Household, a senior position within the Opposition Whips' Office.

He is an officer of four All-Party Parliamentary Groups (APPGs) for:

- Adult Social Care
- Special Educational Needs and Disabilities
- Slovenia
- The Ahmadiyya Muslim Community, the headquarters of which is located in Islamabad, Tilford in his constituency.

He was elected by his colleagues in the Conservative Party to the executive committee of the 1922 Committee shortly after the general election.

== Electoral history ==
General election 2024: Farnham and Bordon
Party	Candidate	Votes	%	±%
Conservative	Greg Stafford	18,951	35.7	−23.7
Liberal Democrats	Khalil Yousuf	17,602	33.2	+0.4
Labour	Alex Just	7,328	13.8	+7.0
Reform	Ged Hall	6,217	11.7	N/A
Green	Claire Matthes	2,496	4.7	+3.8
Hampshire Ind.	Don Jerrard	421	0.8	N/A
Majority		1,349	2.5	−24.0
Turnout		53,015	69.8	−0.3
Registered electors		75,918		
Conservative hold		Swing	−12.1	

Parliament of the United Kingdom
New constituency	Member of Parliament for Farnham and Bordon; 2024–present	Incumbent
