= Chancellor Healey =

Chancellor Healey may refer to:

- Denis Healey (1917–2015), British chancellor of the exchequer from 1974 to 1979
- John Healey (born 1960), British chancellor of the exchequer from 2026
