= Jake Richards (politician) =

British politician (born 1989)

Jake Richards MP
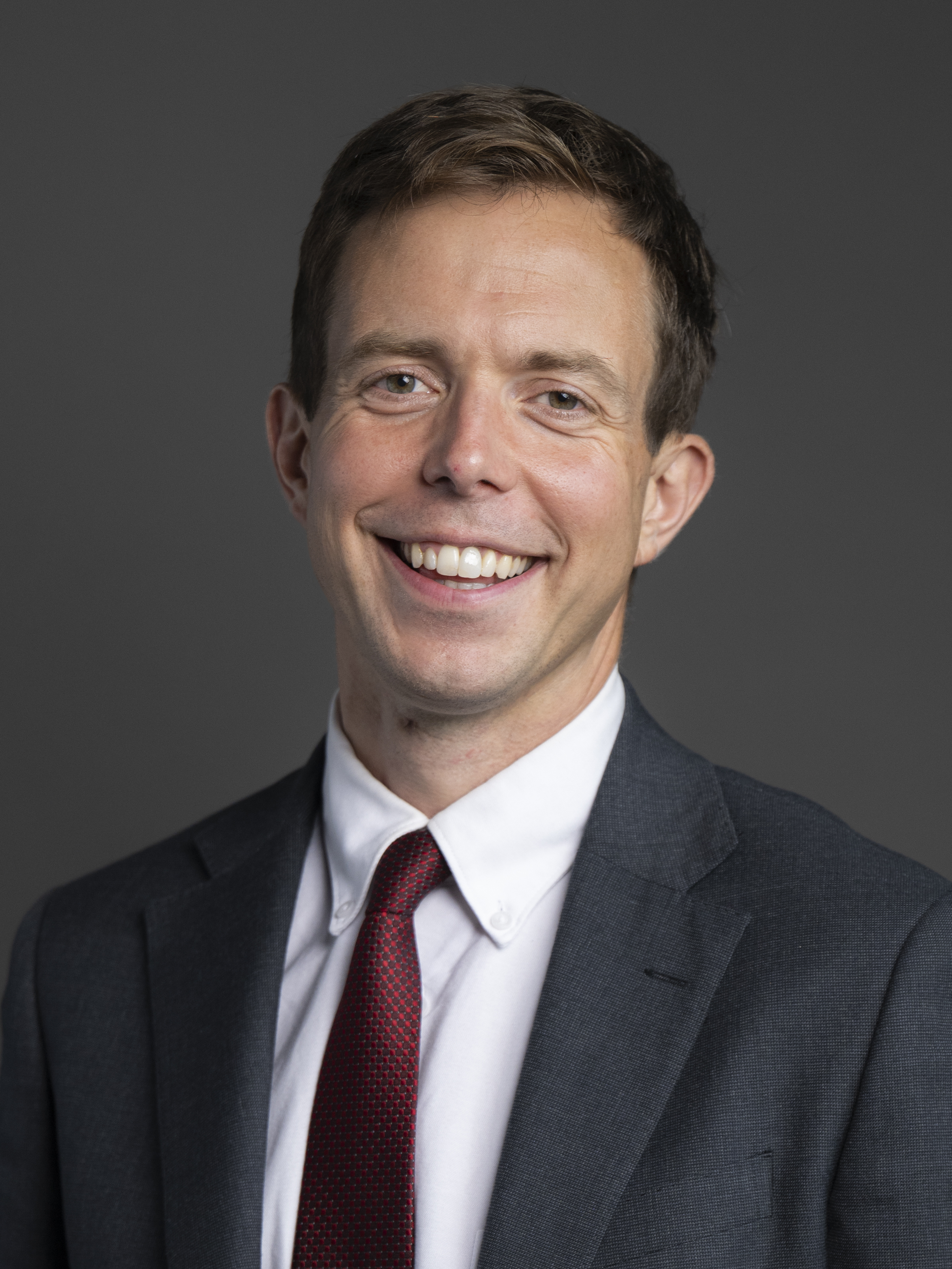
- Official portrait, 2024

Parliamentary Under-Secretary of State for Sentencing, Human Rights and Technology (Note: Parliamentary Under-Secretary of State for Sentencing, Youth Justice and International until July 2026)
- Incumbent
- Assumed office 7 September 2025
- Prime Minister: Keir Starmer; Andy Burnham
- Preceded by: Nic Dakin

Assistant Government Whip
- In office 7 September 2025 – 22 July 2026
- Prime Minister: Keir Starmer

Member of Parliament for Rother Valley
- Incumbent
- Assumed office 4 July 2024
- Preceded by: Alexander Stafford
- Majority: 998 (2.4%)

Personal details
- Born: Jacob Ben Richards; 5 July 1989 (age 37) London
- Party: Labour
- Parent: Steve Richards
- Education: Somerville College, Oxford; City, University of London

Jacob Ben Richards (born 5 July 1989) is a British Labour Party politician who has been the Member of Parliament (MP) for Rother Valley since 2024. He has served as Parliamentary Under-Secretary of State for Sentencing, Youth Justice and International since 2025.

== Early life and education ==
Jacob Ben Richards was born on 5 July 1989, the son of journalist and broadcaster Steve Richards. He was educated at Highgate School, a private fee-paying school in North London, and then attended Woodhouse College. He read history at Somerville College, Oxford.

Following his undergraduate studies, he completed the Bar Professional Training Course (BPTC) at City, University of London. He was called to the bar in 2017. He worked as a barrister at Deka Chambers in London; his colleague Catherine Atkinson was also elected as a Labour MP at the 2024 general election.

== Parliamentary career ==
Richards was selected as the Labour candidate for Rother Valley after the previous candidate, Dominic Beck, stood down in December 2022 following concerns over his position on Rotherham Council during the Rotherham child sexual exploitation scandal.

Richards is a co-sponsor of Kim Leadbeater's Terminally Ill Adults (End of Life) Bill on assisted suicide. He has served as a member of the Home Affairs Select Committee since October 2024.

In December 2025, as Under-Secretary of State at the Ministry of Justice, Richards refused Jeremy Corbyn's request during Justice Questions that he meet with the representatives of Palestine Action hunger strikers being held on remand, to laughter from some MPs.

== Personal life ==
Richards is married to the former Sky News political correspondent Liz Bates, with whom he has a daughter. In September 2025, Bates was appointed as special adviser to Steve Reed, Secretary of State for Housing, Communities and Local Government. His sister, Amy Richards, was a special adviser to Home Secretary Yvette Cooper, and in 2025 was promoted to Political Director to the Prime Minister Keir Starmer.

Richards's brother-in-law is Gregor Poynton, Labour MP for Livingston since 2024.

Recent reports from November 2025 indicate that Labour Chief Whip Jonathan Reynolds has told some MPs he is unhappy in his role amid growing discontent over the appointment of close family members of senior No 10 figures to whip positions, a reshuffle that appointed Richards and Poynton to the Whip's Office.

== Electoral history ==
General election 2024: Rother Valley
Party	Candidate	Votes	%	±%
Labour	Jake Richards	16,023	38.5	+5.9
Conservative	Alexander Stafford	15,025	36.1	−10.0
Reform	Tony Harrison	7,679	18.5	+6.8
Green	Paul Martin	1,706	4.1	+1.6
Liberal Democrats	Colin Taylor	1,175	2.8	−2.0
Majority		998	2.4	N/A
Turnout		41,608	59.9	−4.9
Registered electors		69,460		
Labour gain from Conservative		Swing	+8.0	

== Notes ==
Parliament of the United Kingdom
Preceded by Alexander Stafford	Member of Parliament for Rother Valley; 2024–present	Incumbent
