= Edward Dunn (politician) =

British politician (1880–1945)

Edward Dunn (21 December 1880 – 8 April 1945) was a British Labour Party politician.

Born in Dudley, Dunn grew up in Kiveton Park near Rotherham. He followed his father in becoming a coal miner, and he joined the Yorkshire Miners' Association. He was elected to Maltby Parish Council, becoming its chair in 1924, continuing as chair of its successor, the Maltby Urban District Council, until his death. In 1919, he was elected to the West Riding County Council, becoming an alderman in 1922, and leader of the Labour group on the council from 1933 until 1936.

At the 1935 general election, Dunn was elected as Member of Parliament (MP) for Rother Valley. He served as Parliamentary Private Secretary to Arthur Henderson for a few months in 1942. From 1941, he was also the deputy regional commissioner for the North Eastern Civil Defence Region. He died in office in April 1945 aged 64, but no by-election was held because the 1945 general election was held in July.

Parliament of the United Kingdom
Preceded by Thomas Walter Grundy	Member of Parliament for Rother Valley; 1935–1945	Succeeded by David Griffiths
