= Thomas Walter Grundy =

British politician

Grundy in 1923

Thomas Walter Grundy (1864 – 28 January 1942) was an English Labour Party politician. He was the Member of Parliament (MP) for Rother Valley.

Grundy worked as a coal miner before winning election as a checkweighman. He became active in the Yorkshire Miners' Association, and also in the Labour Party. He was elected to Rotherham School Board in 1893, then Rotherham Borough Council in 1900, serving as Mayor of Rotherham in 1915/16.

Grundy stood in Rother Valley at the 1918 United Kingdom general election, and held the seat until he stood down in 1935.

Parliament of the United Kingdom
New constituency	Member of Parliament for Rother Valley; 1918 – 1935	Succeeded by Edward Dunn
