= Kevin Barron =

British Labour politician (born 1946)

The Right Honourable Sir Kevin Barron
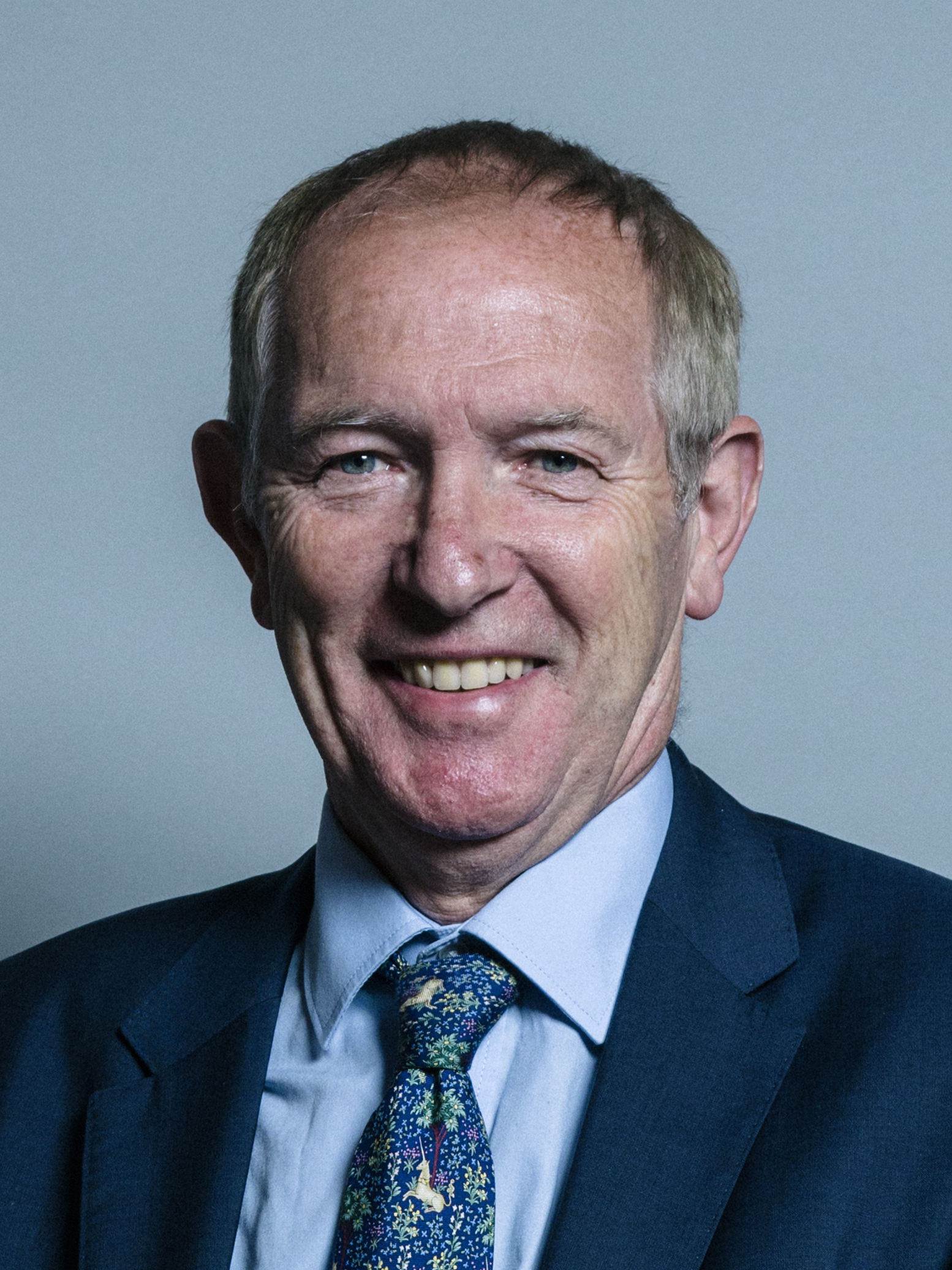
- Official portrait, 2017

Chairman of the Committee of Privileges
- In office 6 July 2010 – 15 October 2018
- Preceded by: Malcolm Rifkind
- Succeeded by: Kate Green

Chairman of the Committee on Standards
- In office 6 July 2010 – 15 October 2018
- Preceded by: Malcolm Rifkind
- Succeeded by: Kate Green

Chair of the Health Select Committee
- In office 18 July 2005 – 6 May 2010
- Preceded by: David Hinchliffe
- Succeeded by: Stephen Dorrell

Parliamentary Private Secretary to the Leader of the Opposition
- In office 30 October 1985 – 11 November 1988
- Leader: Neil Kinnock
- Preceded by: Derek Foster
- Succeeded by: Adam Ingram

Member of Parliament for Rother Valley
- In office 9 June 1983 – 6 November 2019
- Preceded by: Peter Hardy
- Succeeded by: Alexander Stafford

Personal details
- Born: 26 October 1946 (age 79) Tadcaster, Yorkshire, England
- Party: Labour
- Spouse(s): Carol McGrath (m. 1969; died 2008); 3 children Andree Deane (m. 2012); 3 stepchildren
- Education: Ruskin College
- Website: parliament..kevin-barron

Sir Kevin John Barron (born 26 October 1946) is a British Labour Party politician and former coal industry worker. He was the Member of Parliament (MP) for Rother Valley from 1983 until 2019.

== Early life ==
Kevin John Barron, the son of Richard and Edna Barron, was born on 26 October 1946 at Hazlewood Castle, Tadcaster, Yorkshire, and educated at Maltby Hall Secondary Modern School, Ruskin College, and the University of Sheffield, where he earned a Diploma in Labour Studies in 1977, and was reportedly a member of Militant.

On leaving school in 1962, Barron became an electrician at the Maltby colliery. He spent the next 23 years working in the coal industry. In 1982, he became president of the Rotherham Trades Union Congress. He was a member of the National Union of Mineworkers (NUM), which later expelled him for speaking out against Arthur Scargill. Once, on picketing duty outside Maltby colliery, he was struck on the arm by a police baton. He successfully sued South Yorkshire Police for this. He was a political ally of Arthur Scargill.

== Parliamentary career ==
In 1983 Peter Hardy, Labour MP for Rother Valley, decided to switch constituencies to fight the equally safe neighbouring new seat of Wentworth. With NUM backing, Barron secured the nomination, and was duly elected as the Labour MP for Rother Valley at the 1983 general election.

In 1985, Barron was made a Parliamentary Private Secretary to the Leader of the Opposition Neil Kinnock, a position he held until the 1988 election. Kinnock gave Barron a frontbench job in 1988 as an opposition spokesman on Energy. He lost this position when John Smith took over the leadership and he refused another front bench position. Barron was returned to the front bench nine months later as a spokesman on Employment by the new leader John Smith, and following Smith's death Tony Blair moved Barron to speak on Health matters.

Barron was a leading figure in the campaign to rewrite Clause IV under the new leadership of Tony Blair, and it came as a surprise that there was no job in government for him after the victorious 1997 general election. He served for eight years on the senior Intelligence and Security Committee and was made a Privy Councillor in 2001. He was made Chairman of the influential Health Select Committee following the 2005 general election.

Barron has been a Member of the General Medical Council since 1999, and is passionately anti-smoking.

Following the MP's expenses row, Barron placed his expenses claims cover sheets in the window of his constituency office in Laughton Road, Dinnington. In the review of Past Additional Cost Allowance by Sir Thomas Legg QC, Barron was found to have no issues and was not required to repay any monies. In May 2010, Barron was returned to Westminster as the MP for Rother Valley with a severely reduced majority. In July 2010, he was appointed chair of the parliamentary Standards and Privileges Committee and was returned unopposed to that post after the 2015 general election.

Barron was knighted in the 2014 New Year Honours for political and public service.

In 2015, three Rotherham Labour MPs, Barron, Sarah Champion and John Healey, started a defamation legal action against UKIP MEP Jane Collins after Collins falsely alleged in a UKIP conference speech that the three MPs knew about child exploitation in Rotherham but did not intervene, and in February 2017 the MPs were awarded £54,000 each in damages.

In October 2016, Barron was found to have broken the parliamentary code in 2011. He was found to have taken funding from the Japanese Pharmaceutical Group to arrange banquets in the House of Commons, against Commons rules.

In the House of Commons he sat on the Committee on Privileges and Speaker's Committee for the Independent Parliamentary Standards Authority and previously sat on the Committee on Standards, Liaison Committee (Commons), Health and Social Care Committee, Intelligence and Security Committee of Parliament, Environment Committee and Energy Committee.

Barron campaigned for Remain in the 2016 referendum on the UK's EU membership.

He supported Owen Smith in the failed attempt to replace Jeremy Corbyn in the 2016 Labour Party leadership election.

Barron was one of only three Labour MPs to vote for Theresa May's Brexit deal in the Meaningful vote on 15 January 2019 (along with Ian Austin and John Mann). In June 2019, he was one of only 8 Labour MPs to reject Labour's efforts to stop a no-deal Brexit. This decision was extremely controversial, with Barron being widely denounced by members of his party.

In July 2019, he announced he would not be contesting the next general election, which was subsequently held in December of that year.

== Personal life ==
Barron married Carol McGrath in 1969 in Rother Valley; the couple had a son and two daughters. Carol Barron died in June 2008. Kevin Barron remarried, to Andree Deane, in 2012. He became stepfather to her three children.. He currently lives in the Peak District.

== Honours ==
- (United Kingdom) He was sworn in as a member of Her Majesty's Most Honourable Privy Council in 2001. This gave him the Honorific Title "The Right Honourable" for Life.
- (United Kingdom) He was knighted in the 2014 New Years Honours List. This gave him the Honorific Title "Sir" for Life.

Parliament of the United Kingdom
Preceded by Peter Hardy	Member of Parliament for Rother Valley; 1983–2019	Succeeded by Alexander Stafford
