= Trade Union Group of Labour MPs =

The Trade Union Group of Labour MPs is a British group of all Labour Members of Parliament who are members of trade unions that are affiliated to the British Labour Party. The group is a vehicle for promoting the voices of the trade unions in Parliament. The group meets regularly to discuss issues related to trade unions, keeping members informed via a web-based bulletin.

== History ==
The group was founded in 1926, in response to the increasing number of non-trade union sponsored MPs in the Labour Party. In 1929, the Trades Union Congress (TUC) became unhappy with the line of the Labour government on unemployment, and so it reformed the group in an attempt to put pressure on it. At the 1931 UK general election, almost all the Labour MPs were sponsored, so the group was suspended.

The group was revived in 1937, on a far more professional basis. It began liaising closely with the TUC, holding its own meetings after each meeting of the General Council of the TUC. It focused on discussion and information sharing, also bringing in visiting speakers from trade unions around the world, but did not attempt to lobby for any particular policies.

The group ceased operating again during World War II, and was not revived until 1954. focused on supporting the party's leadership against critics, often those on the left wing of the trade union movement. It also played a minor role in promoting industrial policies, and the role of working class experience in the party. It first played a leading role in opposing a specific policy when In Place of Strife was published, the trade unions concerned it was a threat to collective bargaining. It then led opposition to the Conservative Party's Industrial Relations Bill.

In the 1980s, the Trade Union Group became less important, becoming divided over the best line to take on industrial policy, and seeing splits between an increasing number of left-wing former manual workers, the traditional right, and those sponsored MPs without an industrial background. It focused on organising meetings and arranging speakers.

Ian Lavery, MP for Blyth and Ashington, is the current chair of the group. Anneliese Midgley, MP for Knowsley, is its Secretary.

== Leadership ==
=== Secretaries ===
1924: Thomas Mardy Jones
c.1930: Joseph Gibbins
1931: Post vacant
1937: Rhys Davies
1939: Post vacant
1953: Charles Pannell
1964: Neil McBride
1966: Edwin Wainwright
1983: Don Dixon
1996: Gerry Sutcliffe
1998: Ian Davidson
2001: Frank Doran
2015: Katy Clark
2015: Jo Stevens
2024: Anneliese Midgley

=== Chairs ===
1924: Ben Tillett
1926: David Watts Morgan
1931: Post vacant
1937: William Dobbie
1939: Post vacant
1954: George Brown
1964: Ness Edwards
1969: James Hamilton
1971: Eric Varley
1974: Tom Urwin
1980s:
1994: David Clelland
1997:
2002: Tony Lloyd
2012: Ian Lavery
