= Edwin Wainwright =

British politician (1908–1998)

Edwin Wainwright (12 August 1908 – 22 January 1998) was a British Labour Party politician who served as Member of Parliament (MP) for Dearne Valley from 1959 to 1983, when the seat was abolished in boundary changes.

== Early life ==
On 12 August 1908, Wainwright was born in New Scarborough, Wombwell. His father, John Wainwright, was a miner at Darfield Main Colliery and served as chairman of the local National Union of Mineworkers (NUM) branch.

Wainwright was educated at Darfield Council School, before working at Darfield Main as a haulage hand at the age of 14.

== Mining career ==
In 1934, Wainwright was elected to the committee of the Darfield Main NUM branch. He was elected branch delegate in 1939, and branch secretary in 1948. In 1952, he began serving as a member of the NUM national executive. He also served as a committee member to the Darfield Main branch of the Yorkshire Miners' Association during the 1930s, as well as secretary of the mine's Check-Weigh Fund.

=== Local politics ===
In 1939, Wainwright was elected unopposed to Wombwell Urban Council. He served as chairman of the council during 1948, and chairman of the Housing Committee during 1958.

During the 1950s, Wainwright served as a member of the Staincross Division Education Executive, a governor of Wombwell County Secondary School, and West Riding representative on the management of St. Michael's Roman Catholic School in Wombwell. He also served as secretary of the Dearne Valley Division Labour Party.

== Parliamentary career ==
In August 1959, the Dearne Valley Division Labour Party considered Wainwright one of two possible choices to replace Wilfred Paling as their parliamentary candidate. As a miner and NUM representative, he had the backing of the local colliery workers. He was selected as the candidate on 13 September, defeating Dr. Donald Higgins, who had been secretary of Wath Labour Party since 1937.

In October 1959, Wainwright was elected Member of Parliament for Dearne Valley over David Stewart Willisley Blacker, the Conservative Party candidate. He increased the party's majority to 27,883 votes.

=== Labour MP ===
In 1964, Wainwright served on the committee stage of the first Continental Shelf bill.

From 1966 until 1983, Wainwright served as secretary of the Trade Union Group of the Parliamentary Labour Party (PLP). He also served as secretary of the Yorkshire Group of the PLP.

Wainwright was a member of Labour Friends of Israel.

== Personal life ==
In June 1938, Wainwright married Dorothy Metcalfe in Wombwell. They had two sons (Tony and John) and two daughters (Sheila and Susan). Wainwright died on 22 January 1998 in Wombwell.

During the 1930s, Wainwright played for Wombwell Station Road F.C. and served as secretary for the club.

== Awards and recognition ==
In 1957, Wainwright was awarded a British Empire Medal in the New Year Honours.

Parliament of the United Kingdom
Preceded by Wilfred Paling	Member of Parliament for Dearne Valley; 1959–1983	Succeeded by (constituency abolished)
