= David Griffiths (politician) =

British politician

David Griffiths (22 March 1896 – 13 January 1977) was a British Labour Party politician.

At the 1945 general election, he was elected as member of parliament for Rother Valley. He held the seat through six further general elections until his retirement from the House of Commons at the 1970 election.

Parliament of the United Kingdom
Preceded by Edward Dunn	Member of Parliament for Rother Valley; 1945–1970	Succeeded by Peter Hardy
