= Peter Hardy, Baron Hardy of Wath =

Former British Labour politician

The Right Honourable The Lord Hardy of Wath DL

Member of the House of Lords
- Lord Temporal
- Life peerage 27 September 1997 – 16 December 2003

Member of Parliament for Wentworth
- In office 9 June 1983 – 8 April 1997
- Preceded by: Constituency established
- Succeeded by: John Healey

Member of Parliament for Rother Valley
- In office 18 June 1970 – 13 May 1983
- Preceded by: David Griffiths
- Succeeded by: Kevin Barron

Personal details
- Born: 17 July 1931 Wath upon Dearne, West Riding of Yorkshire, England
- Died: 16 December 2003 (aged 72) Rotherham, South Yorkshire, England
- Party: Labour
- Spouse: Margaret Brookes (m. 1954)
- Children: 4
- Education: University of Sheffield

Peter Hardy, Baron Hardy of Wath DL (17 July 1931 – 16 December 2003) was a British Labour Party politician.

== Early life ==
The son of a Wath-upon-Dearne miner, Hardy was born on 17 July 1931 and educated at Wath Grammar School. He trained as a teacher at Westminster College, London, and gained a degree in Curricular Studies at Sheffield University before rising to be head of English at Mexborough County Secondary School.

== Political career ==
While a local councillor, he stood unsuccessfully as a parliamentary candidate in several safe Conservative seats - in 1964 he contested Scarborough and Whitby, and in 1966 he fought Sheffield Hallam.

He entered parliament in 1970 for the Rother Valley constituency. In 1983, when constituency boundaries were re-organised, he moved with a part of his old Rother Valley constituency to the re-formed Wentworth constituency, for which he was Member of Parliament (MP) until retirement from the House of Commons in 1997.

Never keen on the pursuit of high office, he was parliamentary private secretary to Tony Crosland and David Owen. To his constituents he was a popular and hard-working constituency MP. This was reflected in the fact that, despite being identified with the right wing of the Labour party, in 1981 he survived a National Union of Mineworkers-directed attempt to force the local party in his mining constituency to deselect him as its parliamentary candidate in favour of a more left-wing candidate.

His main interests were the lot of the classroom teacher, and wildlife, of which he had an encyclopaedic knowledge. He was a sponsor of much wildlife-related legislation in parliament, including the Badger Act (1973) and the Wild Creatures and Wild Plants Act (1975). During an all-night reading of the Felixstowe Docks Bill he regaled the Commons with impressions of the song birds whose habitats were supposedly threatened by the development.

== House of Lords ==
On 27 September 1997 he was made a life peer as Baron Hardy of Wath, of Wath-upon-Dearne in the County of South Yorkshire and was an active member of the House of Lords until shortly before his death.

Coat of arms of Peter Hardy, Baron Hardy of Wath

Crest
A badger sejant erect proper supporting a miner’s safety lamp Or.
Escutcheon
Sable between ten piles wavy Argent issuant from the flanks three lady’s slipper orchids in pale Or.
Supporters
On either side a greyhound sable winged Or.
Motto
Observe Consider Respond

== Personal life and death ==
In 1954, Hardy married Margaret Brookes, with whom he had two sons and adopted another two; they were predeceased by two of their sons.

Outside parliament, he served on the council of the Royal Society for the Protection of Birds and the NSPCC. He is the author of A Lifetime of Badgers, published in 1975.

Hardy died from cancer at Rotherham General Hospital on 16 December 2003, at the age of 72.

Parliament of the United Kingdom
Preceded by David Griffiths	Member of Parliament for Rother Valley; 1970 – 1983	Succeeded by Kevin Barron
New constituency	Member of Parliament for Wentworth; 1983 – 1997	Succeeded by John Healey
