= Alexander Stafford =

British politician

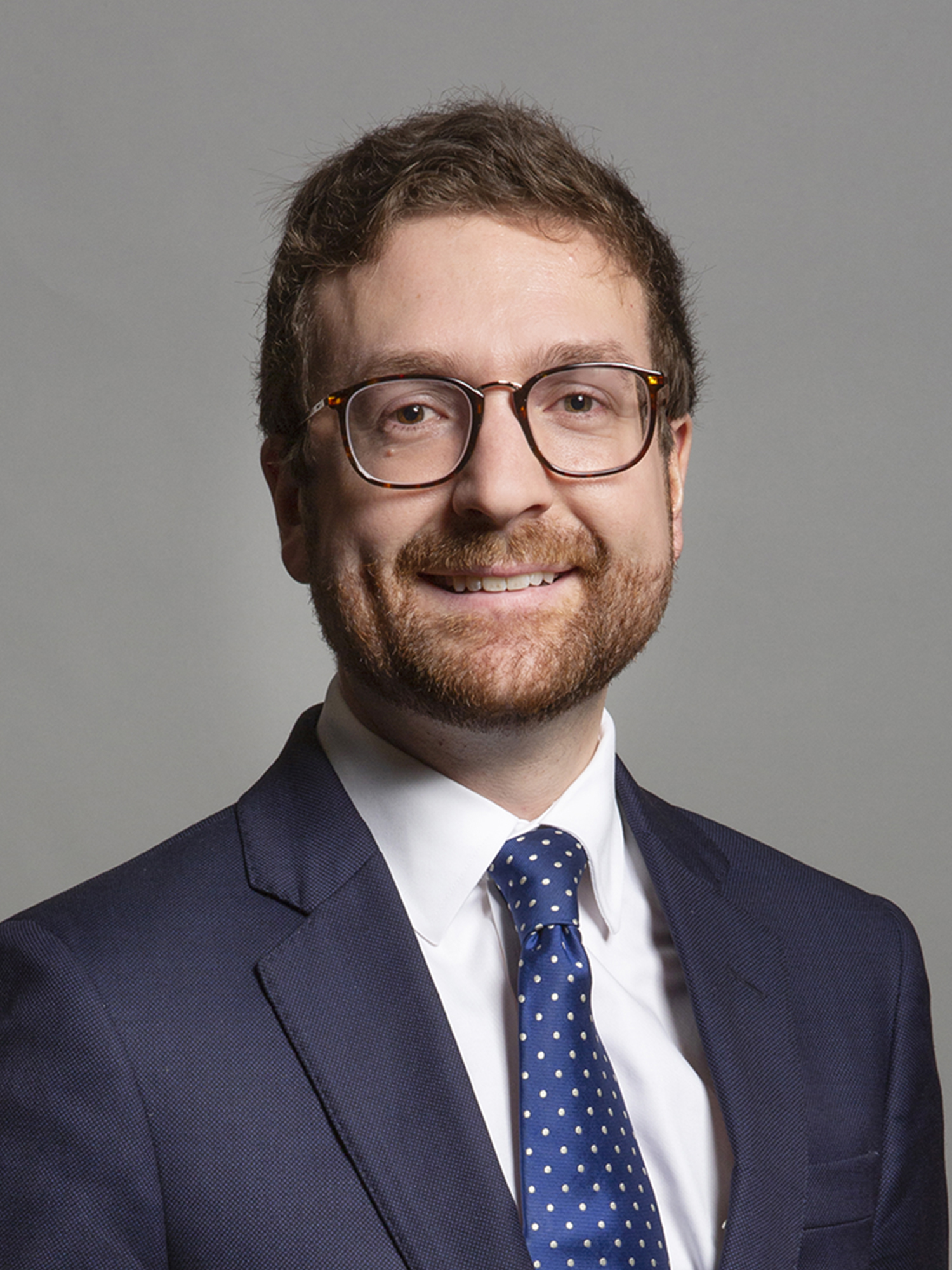
- Official portrait, 2019

Vice Chairman of the Conservative Party for Policy
- In office 30 September 2022 – 13 November 2023
- Leader: Liz Truss; Rishi Sunak

Parliamentary Private Secretary to the Prime Minister
- In office 8 July 2022 – 6 September 2022
- Prime Minister: Boris Johnson
- Preceded by: Joy Morrissey; Lia Nici; James Duddridge
- Succeeded by: Suzanne Webb

Member of Parliament for Rother Valley
- In office 12 December 2019 – 30 May 2024
- Preceded by: Kevin Barron
- Succeeded by: Jake Richards

Ealing London Borough Councillor for Ealing Broadway
- In office 22 May 2014 – 1 April 2020

Personal details
- Born: Alexander Paul Stafford; 19 July 1987 (age 39)
- Party: Conservative
- Spouse: Natalie
- Children: Three
- Relatives: Gregory Stafford (brother)
- Education: St Benedict's School, Ealing, St Benet's Hall, Oxford

Alexander Paul Thomas Stafford (born 19 July 1987) is a British politician, commentator, published historian and leading English Catholic who served as the Member of Parliament (MP) for Rother Valley from 2019 to 2024. He was the first Conservative to be elected for the seat.

In the 2024 general election, he lost his seat to Jake Richards of the Labour Party.

== Early life and career ==
Stafford grew up in Ealing Broadway, went to St Benedict's School, Ealing on a choral scholarship and was part of the Ealing Youth Orchestra. His mother was a magistrate and his father worked for a US technology company. His maternal grandmother was a Polish East German refugee, while his maternal grandfather was a Polish Ukrainian refugee who volunteered to serve in the British Army when the Soviet Union joined the Allies, having previously spent time imprisoned in a Siberian Gulag camp.

Stafford studied history at St Benet's Hall, Oxford where he served as president of the Oxford University Conservative Association (in Michaelmas Term of 2007), as president of The Newman Society (in Hilary Term of 2006), and on the executive of the Oxford University Student Union. Before becoming an MP, Stafford worked for Shell, the World Wildlife Fund and Conservative MP Owen Paterson.

== Political career ==
Stafford's political career began when he was elected to Ealing Council in West London, where he represented the ward of Ealing Broadway from 2014 to 2021.. In November 2019, he was selected as the prospective parliamentary candidate for Rother Valley. He was elected at the 2019 general election, becoming the first non-Labour MP to represent Rother Valley in the 101-year history of the constituency.

Stafford was a member of the Business, Energy and Industrial Strategy Committee and was chair of the All-Party Parliamentary Group on Algeria.

In November 2020, Stafford secured and spoke at the first ever parliamentary debate dedicated to hydrogen, and he has expressed his desire to see Rother Valley "turned into Britain's Hydrogen Valley", adding: "It is clear that the success of the UK's national hydrogen strategy is inextricably linked to its location in the North, particularly in Yorkshire and the Humber."

In January 2022, it was announced that Stafford had been invited to join the Government benches, having been appointed Parliamentary Private Secretary to the Ministry of Defence. This was the first such appointment for a Rother Valley MP since the 1970s. In July 2022, Stafford was appointed Parliamentary Private Secretary to the Prime Minister Boris Johnson, a role requiring him to attend meetings of the Cabinet and aid in the handling of parliamentary affairs within Johnson's office, including preparations for Prime Minister's Questions; Stafford responded to the news of his appointment by vowing to "take every opportunity to ensure Rother Valley's voice is heard at the highest level."

=== Political views ===
Stafford campaigned to leave the European Union during the 2016 referendum.

Stafford has previously named Margaret Thatcher as his political idol, who he believes "was a strong leader who saved the country from where it was headed. Right to buy gave everyone a stake in the country." However, in the midst of the COVID-19 pandemic, Stafford argued for the importance of a "green recovery" which would avoid mistakes made during the premiership of Thatcher: "In the 1980s under Thatcher, the closure of the coal mines, there was a cliff edge, a cut-off, that created lots of social problems and economic problems. We need to manage the transition better. We can't leave anyone behind."

Stafford described himself as belonging to the political tribe of David Cameron and was a supporter of Cameron's Big Society policy "as things like Free Schools give power to local bodies. People know best how to run their own lives." One of Stafford's contributions at Prime Minister's Questions in 2021 was described as that "of a proper old-school Law and Order Tory: tough on crime and anti-social behaviour."

In May 2021 Stafford wrote an essay entitled "Social Conservatism – Turning the Red Wall Blue for Years to Come" for inclusion in Common Sense: Conservative Thinking for a Post-Liberal Age published by the Common Sense Group, an informal group of Conservative MPs.

Stafford first supported Penny Mordaunt then endorsed Liz Truss during the July–September 2022 Conservative Party leadership election. In the 2024 Conservative Party leadership election he was the first former MP backer of the winning Kemi Badenoch and was a deputy chairman of her campaign, chairing the policy forums of her campaign. He had previously been her Parliamentary Private Secretary from October 2022 to July 2024.

=== Campaigns ===
==== Childhood literacy ====
Stafford campaigned heavily in parliament for increased childhood literacy and access to books, holding debates in parliament and was a National Literacy Trust champion.

==== Grooming gangs ====
As MP for Rother Valley, Stafford made child sexual exploitation (CSE) one of his prominent local and parliamentary campaigning issues, reflecting the continuing significance of the Rotherham child sexual exploitation scandal in and around his constituency. He repeatedly raised the subject in Parliament, including in response to the Independent Inquiry into Child Sexual Abuse, when he pressed ministers on mandatory reporting and asked what penalties would apply to those who ignored victims or enabled abusers by failing to act. Stafford worked closely with Rotherham survivor and campaigner Sammy Woodhouse, publicly supporting “Sammy’s Law”, a campaign to pardon victims for offences committed under coercion during abuse, and jointly calling for a dedicated Child Criminal and Sexual Exploitation Commissioner to oversee policy, prevention and survivor support. In 2022, Stafford and Woodhouse produced a CSE advice leaflet for delivery to every home in Rother Valley, providing guidance on spotting signs of exploitation, online grooming, reporting routes and safeguarding responsibilities for businesses.

In January 2022, after former Labour peer Nazir Ahmed, Baron Ahmed Lord Ahmed of Rotherham, was convicted of sexually abusing two children, Stafford launched a petition and called for Ahmed to be stripped of his peerage, saying that people convicted of child abuse should automatically lose such titles. Stafford has also been a regular media commentator on CSE and grooming-gang issues, including appearances and interviews with GB News on continuing concerns in Rotherham, local accountability following the scandal, and calls for national action on grooming gangs. In April 2023, Stafford introduced the Public Office (Child Sexual Abuse) Bill under the Ten Minute Rule, seeking to prevent people who had failed in duties relating to child sexual abuse, or who had been convicted of child sexual abuse offences, from holding elected or public office.

==== High street rejuvenation ====
Stafford also successfully campaigned for levelling-up and local investment in Rother Valley, particularly in relation to high streets, skills and regeneration. In 2021 he argued in the House of Commons that the Levelling Up Fund could play a “crucial role” in regenerating Rother Valley’s high streets and said he was working to ensure the constituency received central government funding for local projects. Later that year, Rother Valley was awarded £11 million from the first round of the Levelling Up Fund for three projects: the redevelopment of the former Maltby Grammar School into an incubator space for training, apprenticeships and start-up support; improvements to Rother Valley Country Park, including a new village centre; and investment linked to Gulliver’s Valley Resort and a skills village focused on hospitality and leisure. Stafford subsequently pressed ministers for further investment in other parts of the constituency, including Dinnington, Thurcroft, Swallownest and Kiveton Park. In 2023, Levelling Up minister Dehenna Davison visited the Maltby Grammar School and Dinnington projects, with Stafford securing more than £4 million for Maltby and a £12 million commitment to Dinnington High Street as part of the Capital Regeneration Fund.

==== Small business support ====
Whilst in Parliament Stafford led a successful campaign to support small businesses, by reducing their VAT burden, arguing that local shops, cafés and hospitality venues were vital to jobs, high streets and village life. In February 2024, Small Business Minister Kevin Hollinrake visited Rotherham at Stafford’s invitation for a roundtable with hospitality businesses at The Café At The Corner in Swallownest, where local business owners were able to raise directly the pressures they faced and the support they wanted to see from Government. Stafford’s campaign was later reflected in the March 2024 United Kingdom budget, when the Chancellor increased the VAT registration threshold from £85,000 to £90,000 from 1 April 2024, the first rise in seven years. In his Budget statement, the Chancellor specifically credited representations from Stafford, saying that the change would “reduce the administrative and financial impact of VAT”. Stafford described the measure as a practical success for small businesses, particularly local shops and cafés, by allowing them to keep growing without immediately facing the additional VAT burden.

== 2024 General Election ==
At the 2024 UK General Election, despite the huge national swing against the Conservatives, Stafford only narrowly lost Rother Valley to Labour candidate Jake Richards by just 998 votes. LabourList had earlier identified Rother Valley as a top Labour battleground and reported that 484 people had signed up through the party’s online platform to campaign there, the eighth-highest total in its published list of battleground constituencies.

Labour received 38.5% of the vote and the Conservatives 36.1%, making it the 3rd most marginal seat in Yorkshire. The result was considerably closer than forecasts had suggested: a YouGov MRP in June projected Labour on 45% and the Conservatives on 25%, while a later forecast placed the Conservatives third, on 23%, behind both Labour and Reform UK. BBC election-night coverage likewise highlighted an exit-poll estimate suggesting a Labour–Reform contest in the constituency, whereas Stafford ultimately finished a close second. Following the count, even Richards said that Stafford had fought a “really rigorous campaign” and had worked “incredibly hard”.

== Post-parliamentary career ==
Following his defeat at the 2024 UK General Election, Stafford has worked as a freelance communications specialist.

== Historian ==
Stafford has been an active historian specialising in Byzantine and Late Antiquity. He has been published numerous times including in Iain Dale's book Kings and Queens with a chapter on Harold II and more recently in the book Dictators on Attila. He also held a debate in Parliament on the importance of teaching medieval history in schools.

== Prominent English Catholic ==
Stafford is a practising and prominent Catholic who in 2023 was named by the Catholic Herald as one of the "Leading UK Catholics". In February 2024, he was made a vice president of the Catholic Union of Great Britain. He writes regularly for the Catholic Herald and The Tablet as well as wider publications highlighting persecution of christians across the world, something he championed in parliament. In 2024 as Chairman of the All Party Parliamentary Group to the Holy See he led a parliamentary delegation to meet Pope Francis and other leading Vatican officials.

== Personal life ==
Whilst an MP, Stafford lived in Harthill, a village of his constituency, where he lived with his wife Natalie and their daughters Persephone, who was born in April 2020, and Charlotte, who was born in December 2021. In April 2025 his wife gave birth to their third child Henrietta. His elder brother, Gregory Stafford, was elected as MP for Farnham and Bordon at the 2024 general election, and was formerly Leader of the Conservative Group on Ealing Council in London, where he represented the Hanger Hill ward until a by-election held on 10 October 2024.

Since leaving parliament Stafford has been an active commentator both on broadcast media and in print, working with GB News, Sky News, BBC News, Times Radio and TalkTV, as well as publishing articles and opinion pieces for The Critic Yorkshire Post and Business Green.

Stafford's parents have lived in Poole for over 20 years and his father James is the GP14 Class Captain at Poole Yacht Club.

Parliament of the United Kingdom
Preceded by Kevin Barron	Member of Parliament for Rother Valley; 2019–2024	Succeeded by Jake Richards
Political offices
Preceded by Sarah Dines; Joy Morrissey; Lia Nici	Parliamentary Private Secretary to the Prime Minister; 2022	Succeeded by Nick Catsaras
