= Dearne Valley (constituency) =

Parliamentary constituency in the United Kingdom, 1950–1983

- Former county constituency for the House of Commons

1950–1983
- Created from: Don Valley, Rother Valley and Wentworth
- Replaced by: Barnsley East, Don Valley and Wentworth

Dearne Valley was a Parliamentary constituency in South Yorkshire. The constituency was created in 1950 and abolished in 1983. Consisting of small towns and villages based around the Yorkshire coalfields, it was one of the Labour Party's safest seats with large majorities in its history between 20,000 and 30,000 votes over other parties.

== Boundaries ==
The Urban Districts of Conisbrough, Darfield, Mexborough, Swinton, Wath upon Dearne, and Wombwell.

== Members of Parliament ==
Election	Member	Party
1950	Wilfred Paling	Labour
1959	Edwin Wainwright	Labour
1983	constituency abolished	

== Election results ==
=== Elections in the 1970s ===
General election 1979: Dearne Valley
Party	Candidate	Votes	%	±%
Labour	Edwin Wainwright	31,783	68.8	−5.3
Conservative	J. R. Pattman	9,048	19.6	+6.1
Liberal	P. Hargreaves	5,352	11.6	−0.8
Majority		22,735	49.2	−11.6
Turnout		46,183	72.0	+1.0
Labour hold		Swing		

General election October 1974: Dearne Valley
Party	Candidate	Votes	%	±%
Labour	Edwin Wainwright	33,315	74.1	+5.3
Conservative	Peter Wood	6,046	13.5	−0.3
Liberal	P. Hargreaves	5,588	12.4	−3.2
Majority		27,269	60.6	+7.4
Turnout		44,949	71.0	−9.5
Labour hold		Swing		

General election February 1974: Dearne Valley
Party	Candidate	Votes	%	±%
Labour	Edwin Wainwright	34,727	68.8	−6.3
Liberal	P. Hargreaves	7,873	15.6	+5.8
Conservative	Peter Wood	6,950	13.8	−1.3
Independent	A. E. Wilson	906	1.8	New
Majority		26,854	53.2	−6.8
Turnout		50,456	80.5	+8.7
Labour hold		Swing		

General election 1970: Dearne Valley
Party	Candidate	Votes	%	±%
Labour	Edwin Wainwright	33,966	75.1	−6.5
Conservative	Arthur B. Cowl	6,848	15.1	+1.5
Liberal	Peter Hargreaves	4,426	9.8	New
Majority		27,118	60.0	−8.0
Turnout		45,240	71.8	−4.9
Labour hold		Swing		

=== Elections in the 1960s ===
General election 1966: Dearne Valley
Party	Candidate	Votes	%	±%
Labour	Edwin Wainwright	36,735	81.6	+0.9
Conservative	John W. Roberts	6,121	13.6	−5.6
Independent	Peter Hargreaves	2,170	4.8	New
Majority		30,614	68.0	+6.5
Turnout		45,026	76.7	−2.4
Labour hold		Swing		

General election 1964: Dearne Valley
Party	Candidate	Votes	%	±%
Labour	Edwin Wainwright	38,101	80.7	+3.0
Conservative	Bernard Bligh	9,069	19.2	−3.1
Majority		29,032	61.5	+6.1
Turnout		47,170	79.1	−5.5
Labour hold		Swing		

=== Elections in the 1950s ===
General election 1959: Dearne Valley
Party	Candidate	Votes	%	±%
Labour	Edwin Wainwright	39,088	77.7	−0.2
Conservative	David S. W. Blacker	11,205	22.3	+0.2
Majority		27,883	55.4	−0.4
Turnout		50,293	84.6	+4.0
Labour hold		Swing		

General election 1955: Dearne Valley
Party	Candidate	Votes	%	±%
Labour	Wilfred Paling	36,718	77.9	−1.7
Conservative	Rowland Winn	10,402	22.1	+1.7
Majority		26,316	55.8	−3.4
Turnout		47,120	80.6	−5.3
Labour hold		Swing		

General election 1951: Dearne Valley
Party	Candidate	Votes	%	±%
Labour	Wilfred Paling	39,782	79.6	0.0
Conservative	Jack Sizer	10,197	20.4	0.0
Majority		29,585	59.2	0.0
Turnout		49,979	85.9	−2.1
Labour hold		Swing		

General election 1950: Dearne Valley
Party	Candidate	Votes	%	±%
Labour	Wilfred Paling	40,420	79.6	
National Liberal	Aymée Lavender Gandar Dower	10,365	20.4	
Majority		30,055	59.2	
Turnout		50,785	88.0	
Labour hold		Swing		

== Sources ==
- Leigh Rayment's Historical List of MPs – Constituencies beginning with "D" (part 1)
- Richard Kimber's Political Science Resources (Election results since 1951)
