= 1933 Wentworth by-election =

UK Parliamentary by-election

The 1933 Wentworth by-election was held on 22 December 1933. The by-election was held due to the death of the incumbent Labour MP, George Henry Hirst. It was won by the Labour candidate Wilfred Paling.
