= George Harry Hirst =

British politician (1879–1933)

- Hirst in 1923

Member of Parliament for Wentworth
- In office 14 December 1918 – 13 November 1933
- Preceded by: New constituency
- Succeeded by: Wilfred Paling

Personal details
- Born: George Henry Hirst; 17 May 1879 Elsecar, England
- Died: 13 November 1933 (aged 54) Darfield, South Yorkshire, England
- Children: 16

George Henry Hirst (17 May 1879 – 13 November 1933) was a British politician and jurist.

Born in Elsecar, Hirst became a miner and, later, a checkweighman at the Dearne Valley Colliery. He joined the Yorkshire Miners' Association, and served on its council. He joined the Labour Party, and was elected to Darfield Urban District Council, becoming its chair, and also served as a magistrate.

At the 1918 UK general election, Hirst was as Member of Parliament for the new constituency of Wentworth. He held the seat until his death in Darfield, South Yorkshire, aged 54, in 1933.

Hirst married twice and had 16 children, 12 by his second wife.

Parliament of the United Kingdom
New constituency	Member of Parliament for Wentworth; 1918–1933	Succeeded by Wilfred Paling
