= Wilfred Paling =

British Labour Party politician (1883–1971)

The Right Honourable Wilfred Paling
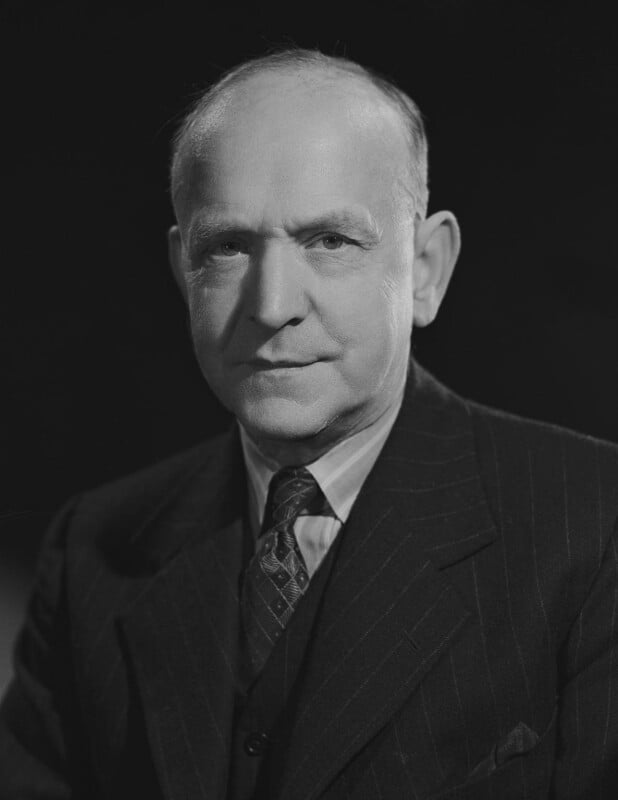
- Paling in 1948

Postmaster General
- In office 17 April 1947 – 28 February 1950
- Prime Minister: Clement Attlee
- Preceded by: William Hare
- Succeeded by: Ness Edwards

Minister of Pensions
- In office 3 August 1945 – 17 April 1947
- Prime Minister: Clement Attlee
- Preceded by: Walter Womersley
- Succeeded by: John Hynd

Parliamentary Secretary to the Minister for Pensions
- In office 1941–1945
- Preceded by: George Tryon
- Succeeded by: William Sidney

Member of Parliament for Dearne Valley
- In office 23 February 1950 – 8 October 1959
- Preceded by: Constituency created
- Succeeded by: Edwin Wainwright

Member of Parliament for Wentworth
- In office 22 December 1933 – 3 February 1950
- Preceded by: George Henry Hirst
- Succeeded by: Constituency abolished

Member of Parliament for Doncaster
- In office 15 November 1922 – 6 October 1931
- Preceded by: Reginald Nicholson
- Succeeded by: Hugh Molson

Personal details
- Born: Wilfred Paling; 7 April 1883 Marehay, Derbyshire, England
- Died: 17 April 1971 (aged 88)
- Party: Labour
- Spouse: Elizabeth Hunt
- Children: 2
- Education: University of Nottingham

Wilfred Paling (7 April 1883 – 17 April 1971) was a British Labour Party politician.

He was born at Marehay, near Ripley, Derbyshire, one of eight children of a coalminer. Paling left Ripley Elementary School at the age of 13, and entered casual employment with local plumbing and building companies. When the family moved to Huthwaite in Nottinghamshire he started work in New Hucknall Colliery, also attending night classes organised by the Workers Educational Association in politics, economics and trade union history. He subsequently won a scholarship to study mining at University College Nottingham. Returning to the Nottinghamshire Coalfield, he became an official in the local miners' federation and a member of the Independent Labour Party.

In 1912 he left Nottinghamshire as his union and political activities meant that he could not find employment in the area. He moved to the West Riding of Yorkshire to work at Bullcroft Colliery near Doncaster. He was soon after elected to the committee of the Yorkshire Miners' Association, and in 1917 became colliery checkweighman. He entered local politics in 1919 when he was elected to the West Riding County Council and to Bentley with Arksey Urban District Council.

At the 1922 general election Paling was elected Member of Parliament (MP) for Doncaster, and was re-elected in 1923, 1924 and 1929. Paling was a Junior Lord of the Treasury 1929–1931. He was defeated at the 1931 general election, when the Labour Party lost many seats to candidates of the National Government.

In 1933 he returned to the Commons when he was returned unopposed at a by-election at Wentworth. He was re-elected at the general elections of 1935 and 1945. He had the largest majority of any MP in the 1945 general election: 35,410.

He joined the wartime coalition government as a Lord Commissioner of the Treasury, in 1940 and was Parliamentary Secretary to the Ministry of Pensions from 1941 to 1945. He was appointed a Privy Counsellor in 1944. In the Labour Government formed after the war he was Minister of Pensions, from 1945 – 1947; and Postmaster General from 1947 – 1950.

The Wentworth constituency was abolished by the Representation of the People Act 1948 with effect from the 1950 general election. Paling was elected for the new seat of Dearne Valley, and was re-elected in 1955. He retired from parliament at the 1959 general election.

Paling married Elizabeth Hunt of Huthwaite, and they had two children. He died at his home in Scawthorpe, near Doncaster, in April 1971.

Parliament of the United Kingdom
Preceded by Reginald Nicholson	Member of Parliament for Doncaster; 1922–1931	Succeeded by Hugh Molson
Preceded by George Harry Hirst	Member of Parliament for Wentworth; 1933–1950	Constituency abolished
New constituency	Member of Parliament for Dearne Valley; 1950–1959	Succeeded by Edwin Wainwright
Political offices
Preceded by The Lord Tyron	Parliamentary Secretary to the Minister for Pensions; 1941 – 1945	Succeeded by William Sidney
Preceded by Walter Womersley	Minister of Pensions; 1945–1947	Succeeded by John Burns Hynd
Preceded by Earl of Listowel	Postmaster General; 1947–1950	Succeeded by Ness Edwards
