= John Healey =

British politician (born 1960)

The Right Honourable John Healey MP
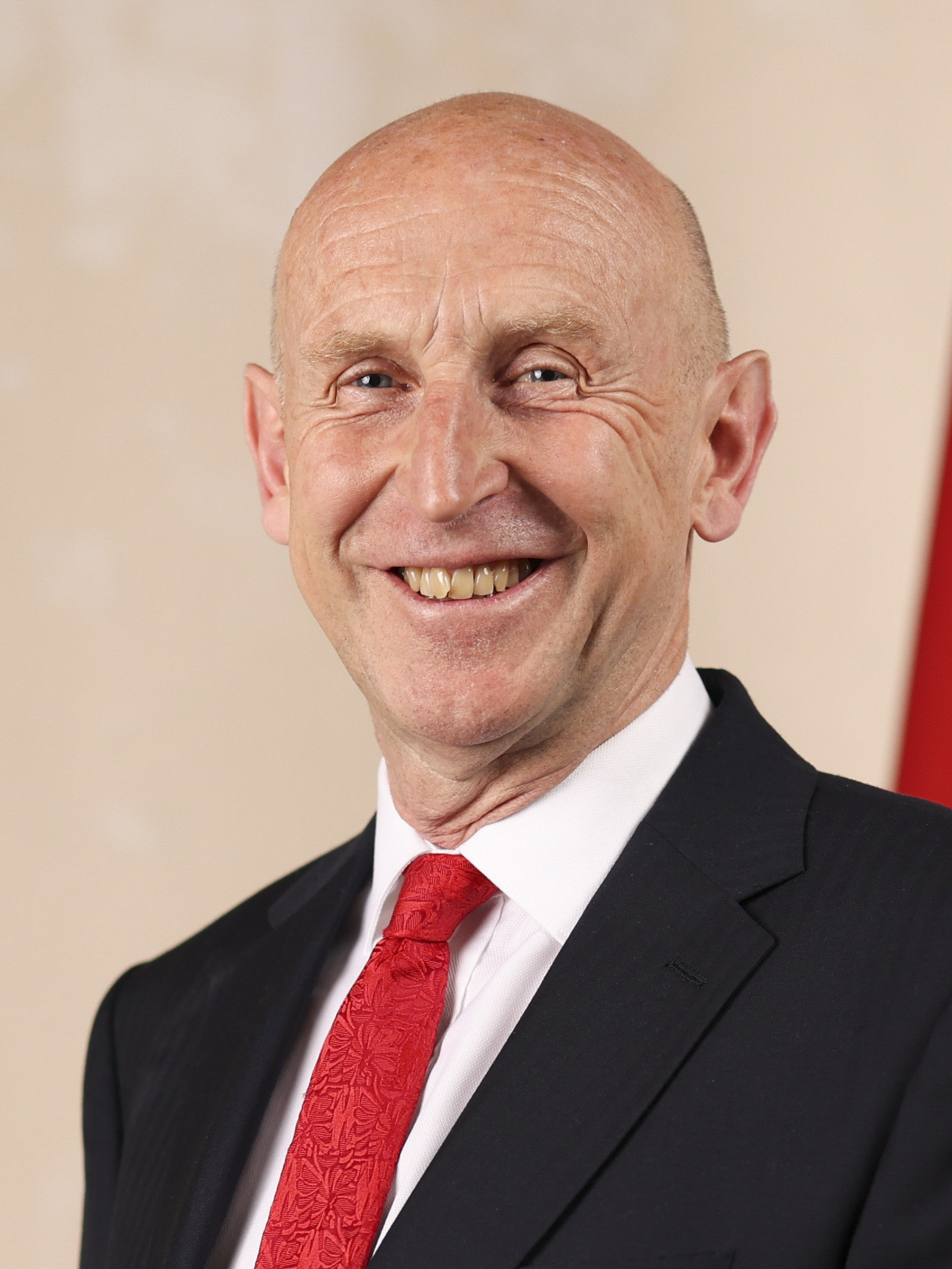
- Official portrait, 2024

Chancellor of the Exchequer
- Incumbent
- Assumed office 20 July 2026
- Prime Minister: Andy Burnham
- Preceded by: Rachel Reeves

Secretary of State for Defence
- In office 5 July 2024 – 11 June 2026
- Prime Minister: Keir Starmer
- Preceded by: Grant Shapps
- Succeeded by: Dan Jarvis
Junior ministerial offices
Minister of State for Housing and Planning
In office 5 June 2009 – 11 May 2010
Prime Minister	Gordon Brown
Preceded by	Margaret Beckett
Succeeded by	Grant Shapps
Minister of State for Local Government
In office 28 June 2007 – 5 June 2009
Prime Minister	Gordon Brown
Preceded by	Phil Woolas
Succeeded by	Rosie Winterton
Financial Secretary to the Treasury
In office 10 May 2005 – 28 June 2007
Prime Minister	Tony Blair
Preceded by	Stephen Timms
Succeeded by	Jane Kennedy
Economic Secretary to the Treasury
In office 30 May 2002 – 10 May 2005
Prime Minister	Tony Blair
Preceded by	Ruth Kelly
Succeeded by	Ivan Lewis
Parliamentary Under-Secretary of State for Adult Skills
In office 11 June 2001 – 30 May 2002
Prime Minister	Tony Blair
Succeeded by	Ivan Lewis
Shadow cabinet portfolios
2020–2024	Defence
2015–2020	Housing
2010–2011	Health
2010	Housing

Member of Parliament of the United Kingdom
- Incumbent
- Assumed office 1 May 1997
- Preceded by: Peter Hardy
- Constituency: Wentworth (1997–2010); Wentworth and Dearne (2010–2024); Rawmarsh and Conisbrough (2024–present)
- Majority: 6,908 (20.4%)

Personal details
- Born: 13 February 1960 (age 66) Wakefield, West Riding of Yorkshire, England
- Party: Labour
- Spouse: Jackie Bate (m. 1993)
- Children: 1
- Education: Christ's College, Cambridge (BA)
- Website: Official website

John Healey (born 13 February 1960) is a British politician who has served as Chancellor of the Exchequer since 2026. He previously served as Secretary of State for Defence from 2024 to 2026. A member of the Labour Party, he has been the member of Parliament (MP) for Rawmarsh and Conisbrough, formerly Wentworth and Wentworth and Dearne, since 1997. He previously held various junior ministerial positions under prime ministers Tony Blair and Gordon Brown from 2001 to 2010.

Born in Wakefield, Healey was educated first at Lady Lumley's School and St Peter's School, York. He studied at Christ's College, Cambridge, where he received a BA degree in Social and Political Science in 1982. After university, he worked as a journalist for The House and then as a disability rights campaigner. He later worked in communications and as a campaign manager for various organisations and trade unions. Following an unsuccessful candidacy for Ryedale at the 1992 general election, Healey was elected to Parliament as MP for Wentworth in the 1997 general election. He served under Blair as Parliamentary Under-Secretary of State for Adult Skills from 2001 to 2002, as Economic Secretary to the Treasury from 2002 to 2005 and as Financial Secretary to the Treasury from 2005 to 2007. Under Brown, he served as Minister of State for Local Government from 2007 to 2009, and then in a cabinet role as Minister of State for Housing and Planning from 2009 to 2010.

After Labour entered opposition at the 2010 general election, he was appointed Shadow Secretary of State for Health by Labour Party leader Ed Miliband. He stood down from the role in October 2011 and returned to the backbenches, then returned to the shadow cabinet as Shadow Secretary of State for Housing under party leader Jeremy Corbyn from 2016 to 2020. He endorsed Owen Smith in the 2016 Labour Party leadership election in an unsuccessful attempt to replace Corbyn. Following Keir Starmer's election as Labour leader, Healey was appointed Shadow Defence Secretary. During his tenure in the position, he supported Ukraine following its 2022 invasion by Russia, and advocated for higher military spending and closer cooperation with NATO.

Following Labour's victory in the 2024 general election, Healey returned to government and was appointed Defence Secretary by Starmer in his ministry. In this role, he maintained close relations with both the Joe Biden and Donald Trump US administrations, including Pete Hegseth. He resigned from the government in June 2026, citing disagreements with Starmer's reluctance to increase defence spending. Following Starmer's resignation, Healey was appointed Chancellor of the Exchequer by Andy Burnham in July 2026.

== Early life and career ==
John Healey was born on 13 February 1960 in Wakefield, the son of Aidan Healey, who was the deputy chief physical education officer of HM Prison Service. He was educated at Lady Lumley's School in Pickering and the private St Peter's School, York, for sixth form. He studied social and political science at Christ's College, Cambridge, where he received a BA degree in 1982.

Healey worked as a journalist and the deputy editor of The House, the internal magazine of the Palace of Westminster, for a year in 1983. In 1984, he became a full-time disability rights campaigner for several national charities.

Healey joined Issues Communications in 1990 as a campaign manager before becoming the head of communications at the Manufacturing, Science and Finance trade union in 1992. He was appointed as the campaign director with the Trades Union Congress in 1994, in which capacity he remained until his election to the House of Commons. He was also a tutor at the Open University Business School.

== Parliamentary career ==
Healey's first attempt to enter Parliament was as candidate for Ryedale at the 1992 general election, where he finished third with 13.8% of the vote behind the incumbent Conservative MP John Greenway and the Liberal Democrat Elizabeth Shields.

=== In government (1997–2010) ===
==== Backbenches ====
At the 1997 general election, Healey was the Labour Party candidate for Wentworth, which had become available following the retirement of the Labour MP Peter Hardy. Healey was elected to Parliament with 72.3% of the vote and a majority of 23,959.

Healey served as a member of the education and employment select committee from 1997 until he became the Parliamentary Private Secretary to the Chancellor of the Exchequer Gordon Brown in 1999.

==== Junior minister ====
At the 2001 general election, Healey was re-elected as MP for Wentworth with a decreased vote share of 67.5% and a decreased majority of 16,449. Following the election, he was appointed as the Parliamentary Under-Secretary of State for Adult Skills at the Department for Education and Skills. On 30 May 2002, he was appointed Economic Secretary to the Treasury.

At the 2005 general election, Healey was again re-elected with a decreased vote share of 59.6% and a decreased majority of 15,056. He was appointed Financial Secretary to the Treasury.

On 29 June 2007, Healey was moved to the Department for Communities and Local Government as a result of a government reshuffle. Shortly after his appointment he assumed responsibility for assisting the recovery from widespread flooding across the United Kingdom.

In a Cabinet reshuffle on 5 June 2009, he was appointed Minister of State for Housing and Planning, replacing Margaret Beckett who had resigned. While Minister of State for Housing and Planning, he was criticised for suggesting that more people renting properties rather than buying their own homes was a good thing.

=== In opposition (2010–2024) ===
==== Shadow cabinet ====
At the 2010 general election, Healey was elected to Parliament as the MP for the newly created constituency of Wentworth and Dearne with 50.6% of the vote and a majority of 13,920.

Healey came second in the election for the shadow cabinet in 2010, and was appointed Shadow Secretary of State for Health. He resigned from this position in 2011 to spend more time with his family.

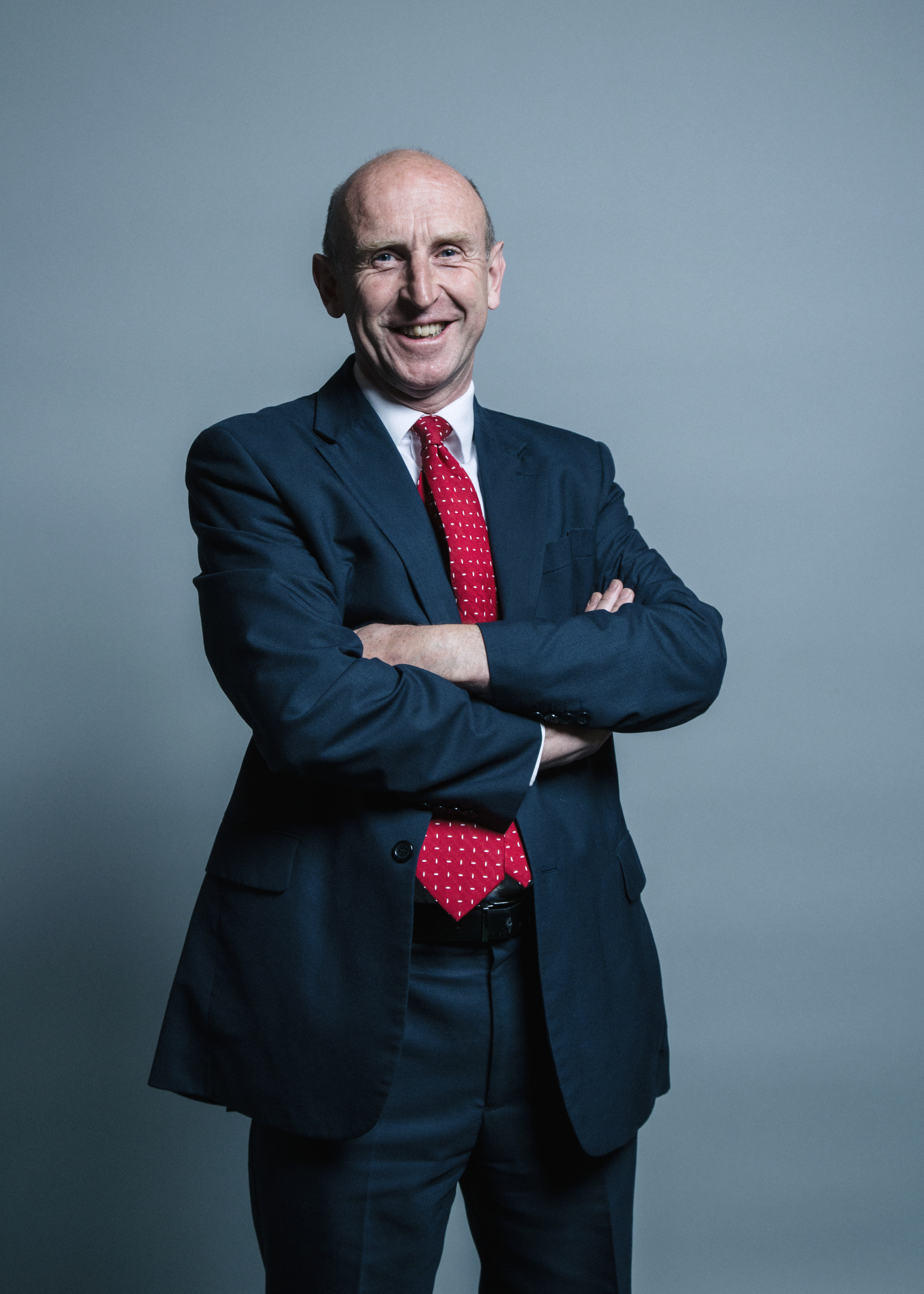
Official portrait, 2017

==== Return to the backbenches ====
At the 2015 general election, Healey was re-elected as MP for Wentworth and Dearne with an increased vote share of 56.3% and a decreased majority of 13,838.

In 2015, three Rotherham Labour MPs, Kevin Barron, Sarah Champion and Healey, started a defamation legal action against UKIP MEP Jane Collins after Collins falsely alleged in a UKIP conference speech that the three MPs knew about child exploitation in Rotherham but did not intervene. In February 2017, the MPs were awarded £54,000 each in damages.

==== Corbyn shadow cabinet ====
Following the election of Jeremy Corbyn as Labour Party leader, Healey was appointed Shadow Minister for Housing. He supported Owen Smith in the failed attempt to replace Jeremy Corbyn in the 2016 Labour leadership election. Following the leadership election, Healey was appointed Shadow Secretary of State for Housing in October 2016.

At the snap 2017 general election, Healey was again re-elected, with an increased vote share of 65% and an increased majority of 14,803. He was again re-elected at the 2019 general election, with a decreased vote share of 40.3% and a decreased majority of 2,165.

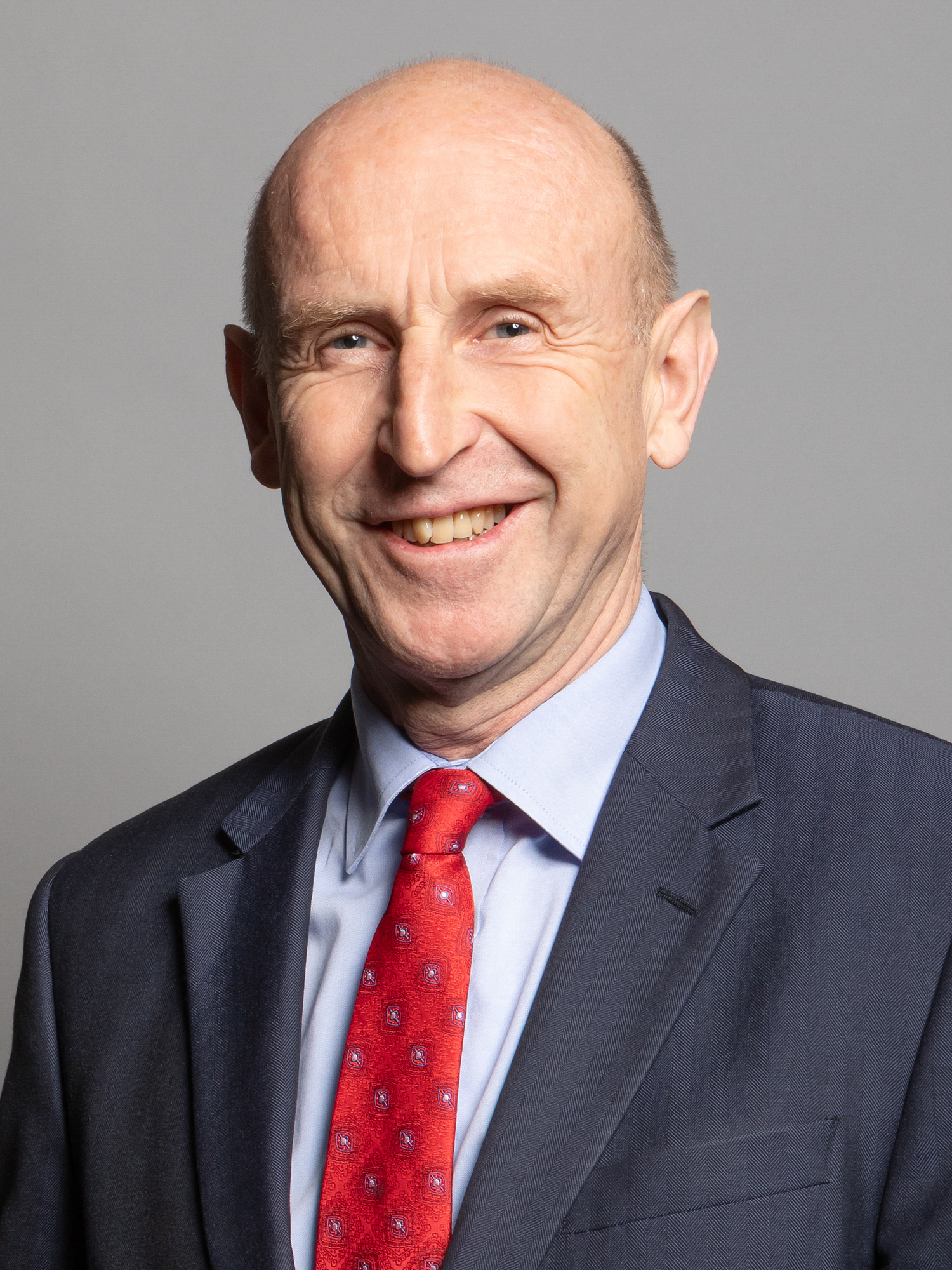
Official portrait, 2020

==== Starmer shadow cabinet ====
Following the election of Sir Keir Starmer as leader of the Labour party, Healey was appointed Shadow Secretary of State for Defence in 2020.

As Shadow Secretary of State for Defence, Healey repeatedly stressed his support for Ukraine in the Russo-Ukrainian war since Russia's invasion in 2022, endorsed the UK's support for Ukraine, and committed to continue Britain's support for Ukraine in any future Labour government. In May 2024, Healey visited Kyiv along with Shadow Secretary of State for Foreign, Commonwealth and Development Affairs David Lammy and met the head of the President's Office Andriy Yermak and Defence Minister Rustem Umerov. In a joint statement, Healey and Lammy stated: "The next Labour government's commitment to Ukraine will be ironclad, and European security will be our first foreign and defence priority."

Healey argued in favour of higher spending on the British military with a larger armed force, closer co-operation and leadership with NATO and European nations over security and defence matters, and for a "comprehensive UK-Germany defence and security pact". Healey has said that NATO will need to do more "heavy-lifting' in Europe, as the winner of the 2024 US Presidential Election is likely to prioritise the threat of China.

In April 2024, Healey committed to raising Britain's defence spending to 2.5% of Britain's GDP by 2030 and commissioning a strategic review of the threats to Britain and its capabilities. In June 2024, he and Starmer announced Labour's nuclear deterrent "triple lock", pledging to build four Dreadnought-class submarines to replace Britain's existing Vanguard-class submarines, maintain a continuous at-sea deterrent, and deliver needed upgrades now and in future.

Healey voted in favour of British participation in the 2003 Iraq War. In 2024, he said that the decision to go to war "wasn't sound at the time" and said the lesson was that military intervention could not have a successful outcome without sufficient diplomatic, economic, and security follow-through.

== Defence secretary (2024–2026) ==
=== Appointment and early tenure ===
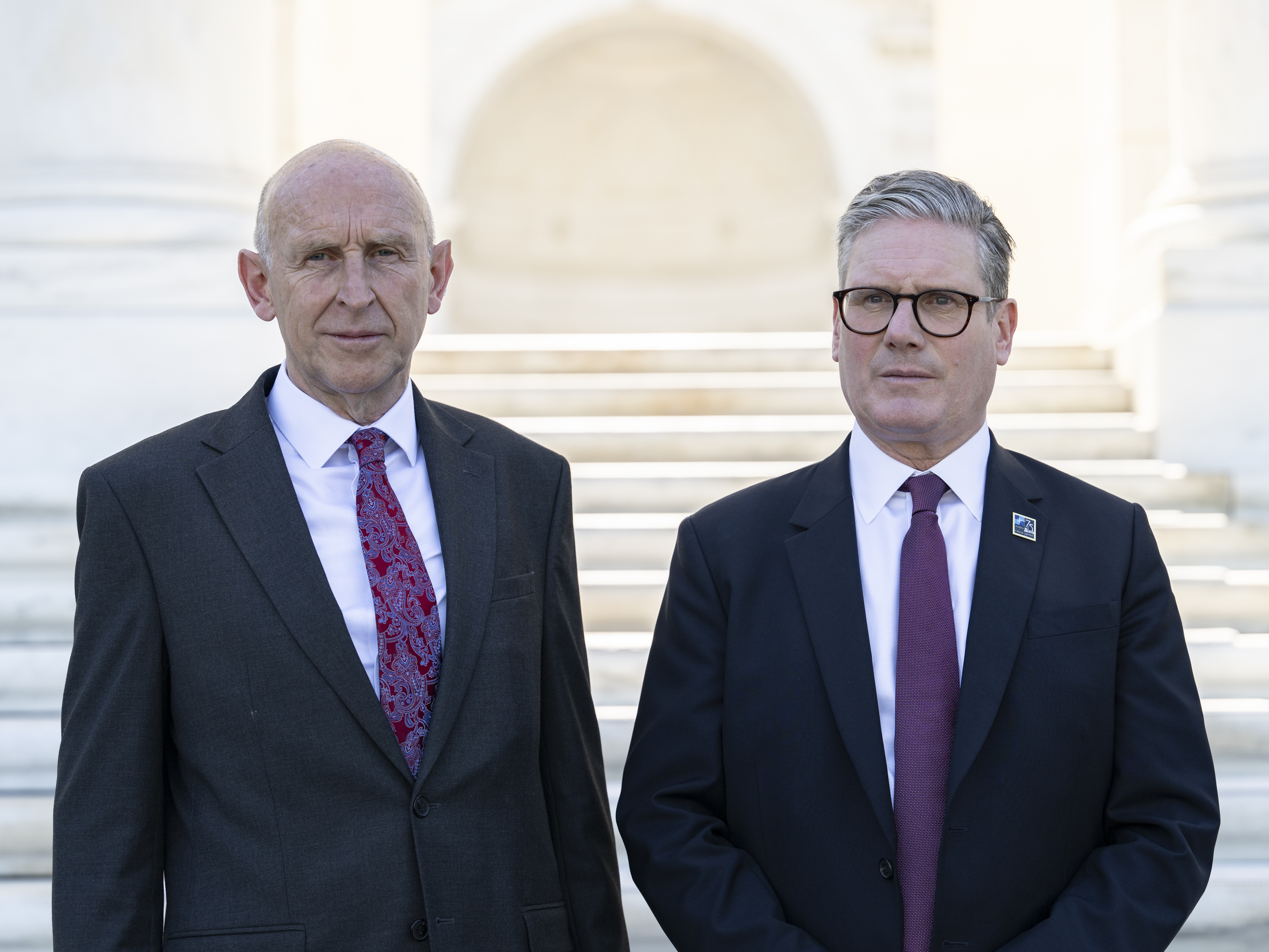
Healey with Prime Minister Keir Starmer at Arlington National Cemetery on 11 July 2024

Owing to the 2023 review of Westminster constituencies, Healey's constituency of Wentworth and Dearne was abolished, and replaced with Rawmarsh and Conisbrough. At the 2024 general election, Healey was elected to Parliament as MP for Rawmarsh and Conisbrough with 49% of the vote and a majority of 6,908. After Labour's victory at the general election, Healey was appointed Secretary of State for Defence by Starmer on 5 July. Healey visited Ukraine shortly after being appointed Defence Secretary, meeting with Volodymyr Zelenskyy in Odesa.

Healey, alongside Starmer, attended the 2024 NATO Summit on 9 July, where he told reporters in that Britain will be the "leading European nation" in defence spending and declared that Britain will be "democracy's most reliable ally". Healey said that he acknowledged that the European members of the alliance, have to take on more responsibility in guarding both Ukraine and the west against Russia and also the need to cooperate with the US regardless of who is inside the White House.

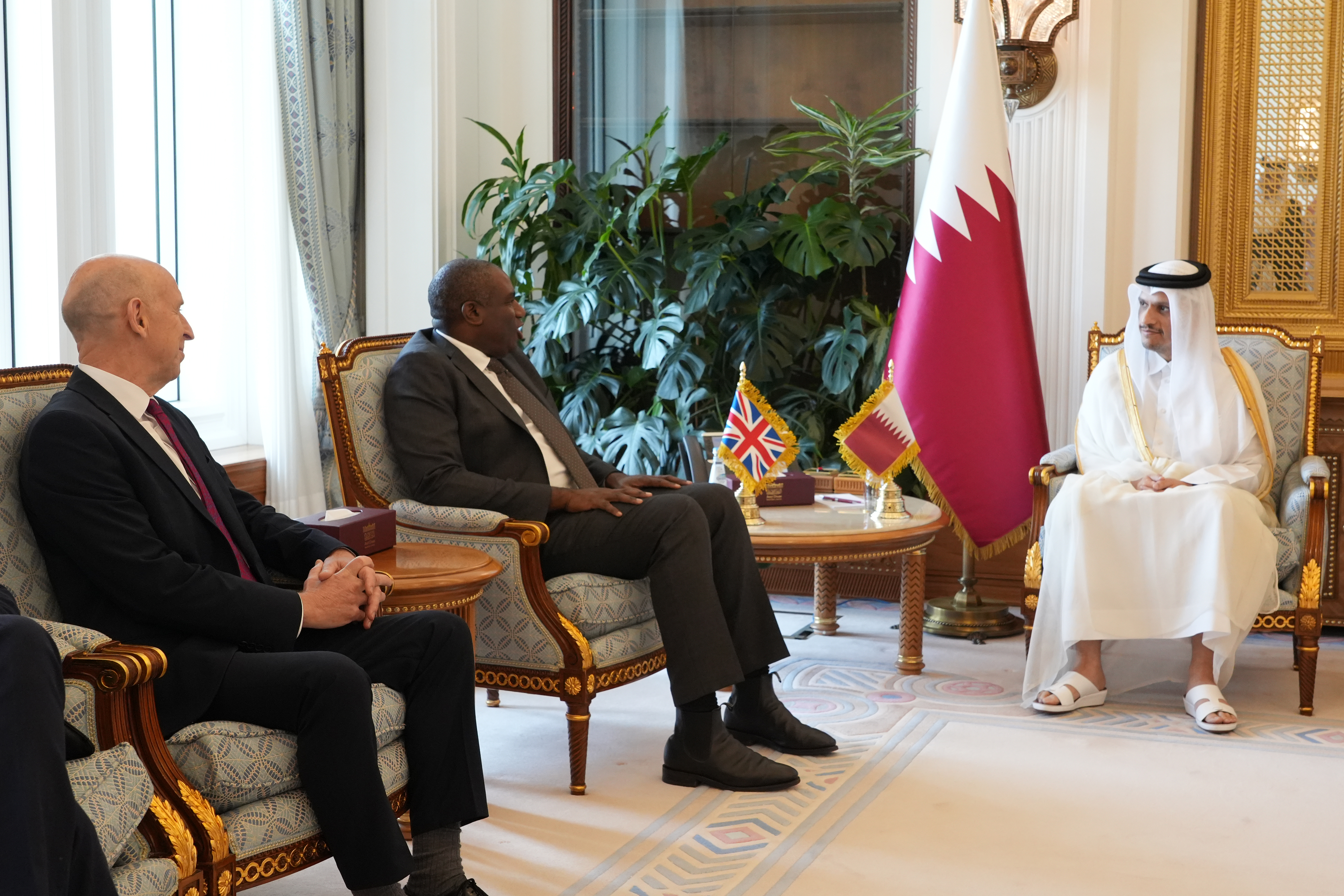
Healey and Foreign Secretary David Lammy with Qatar's prime minister Mohammed bin Abdulrahman bin Jassim Al Thani in Doha, Qatar, 31 July 2024

Healey supported the government's "root and branch" defence review and hailed it as the "first of its kind" which would consider the state of the armed forces, threats to national security and the defence capabilities needed to address with ultimate the goal of spending 2.5% of national income on defence. Upon taking office, Healey said that problems in the British military were "worse than we thought" after a defence review was conducted by the new government. He noted that "these are serious times" with "rapidly increasing global threats" and said that he wanted to avoid "age-old tactics" by the armed forces over funds to back pet projects. Following a financial audit conducted by the government following the election, Healey warned of possible cuts on defence spending as "tough choices" lie ahead to tackle the £22 billion "black hole" in public finances.

=== Gaza war ===
On 3 September 2024, the government announced that it had suspended 30 out of 350 UK arms export licences to Israel. This faced criticism from figures in the Jewish community such as the Chief Rabbi, Ephraim Mirvis. Healey responded by saying that it was the government's "legal responsibility" to review export licences and to judge "whether there is a clear risk that anything we supply from this country could be linked to a serious violation of international humanitarian law". Declassified describes him as responsible for the fact that a full embargo was not applied, and Healey himself said that the UK's support for Israel remained "unshakeable". Healey stated that "without fear or favour" the government will subscribe to international law in reference to ICC prosecutor Karim Khan applying arrest warrants against three senior Hamas officials alongside Israeli Prime Minister Benjamin Netanyahu and Defence Minister Yoav Gallant. Healey also further stated that failure to recognise the ICC ruling will threaten the global "rules-based order".

In August 2025, Healey defended the hundreds of RAF spy flights that had been performed over the Gaza Strip during the 2023–2025 period. British activists argued that the flights made Britain "an active participant in the Gaza genocide". Healey insisted that the flights shared with Israel only information potentially related to the search of the hostages, though Action on Armed Violence described the RAF operations as being "shrouded in secrecy".

=== Ukraine war ===
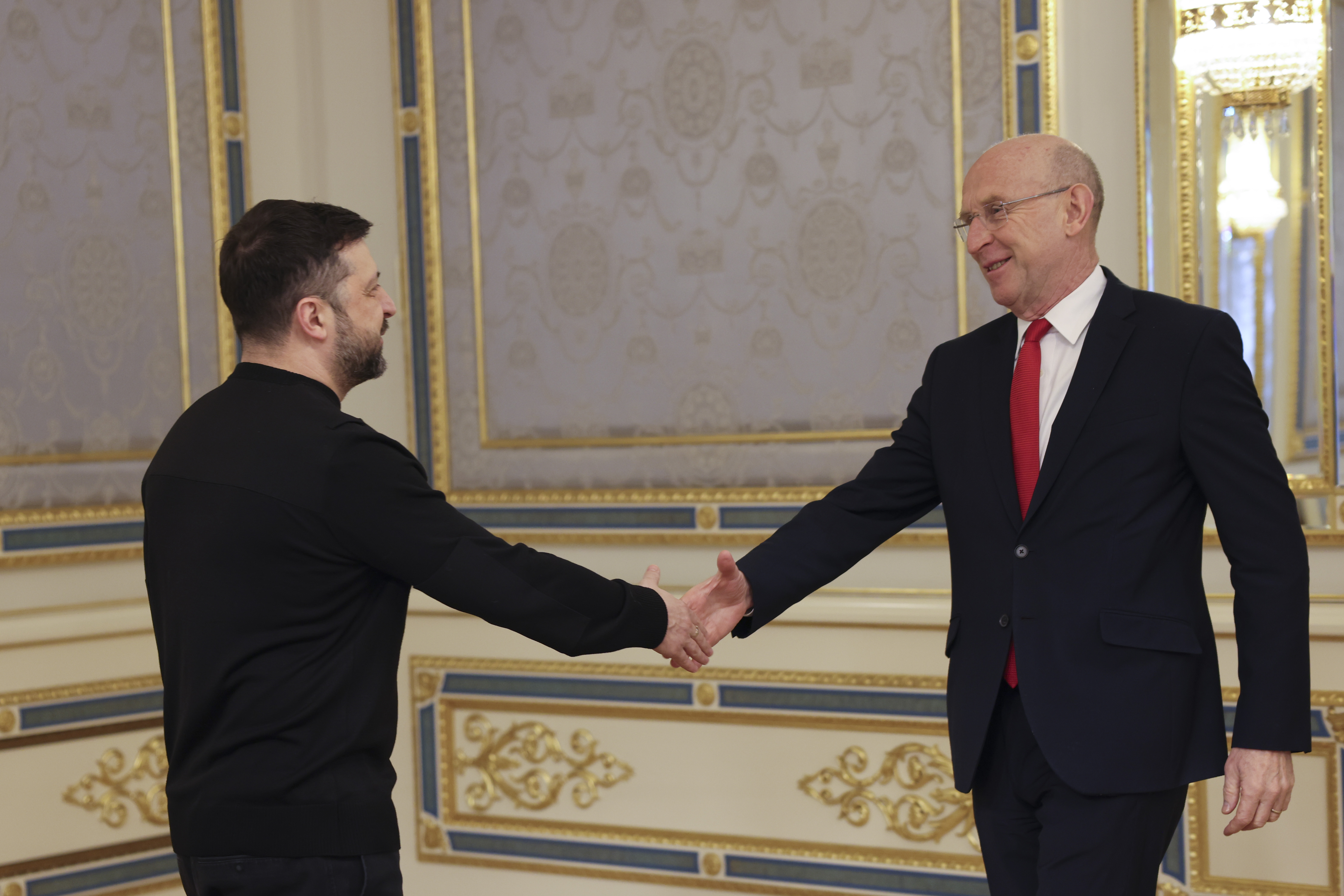
Healey with Ukrainian president Volodymyr Zelenskyy in January 2026

Regarding the war in Ukraine, one of Healey's early actions was to direct officials to expedite military support to Ukraine, including the provision of additional artillery and 90 Brimstone missiles. Healey warned on 13 February 2025 that there can be no negotiation "about Ukraine without Ukraine" after United States President Donald Trump and Vladimir Putin agreed to begin talks to end the war.

=== Other issues ===
In October 2024, Healey condemned Chinese military exercises near Taiwan. In July 2025, Healey said that the UK was prepared to "fight together" with Australia to defend Taiwan from China if necessary.

In October 2024, Healey signed the landmark Trinity House Agreement with Germany, marking a new era of defence cooperation between the two nations. To modernise the UK's defence forces, Healey announced in November 2024 the decommissioning of outdated military assets, including five warships and 70 military aircraft. The £500-million cost-saving measure is intended to redirect funds towards advanced weaponry and capabilities. Healey launched a new Defence Industrial Strategy in December 2024 with the intent of prioritising investment in UK-based defence firms, aiming to stimulate economic growth, create jobs, and enhance national security by fostering innovation and resilience within the sector. In a move to rectify past financial inefficiencies, the UK government, under Healey's direction, reacquired approximately 36,000 military housing properties for £6 billion in January 2025. This decision is projected to save £230 million annually in rent.

In September 2025, Healey warned 'there have to be consequences' for those supporting the banned Palestine Action. Healey said he expected newly appointed Home Secretary Shabana Mahmood to be "just as tough" as Yvette Cooper on Palestine Action.

In February 2026, Healey was accused by the Conservatives of misleading parliament, by claiming in May 2025, that if the UK did not cede the British Indian Ocean Territory (Chagos Archipelago) to Mauritius, it could face losing legal rulings "within weeks", and "within just a few years" the base at Diego Garcia "would become inoperable". Healey claimed that "the most proximate, and the most potentially serious" threat was the International Tribunal for the Law of the Sea (ITLOS), however under Article 298 of the United Nations Convention on the Law of the Sea (UNCLOS) there is an exemption for "disputes concerning military activities, including military activities by government".

=== Iran war ===
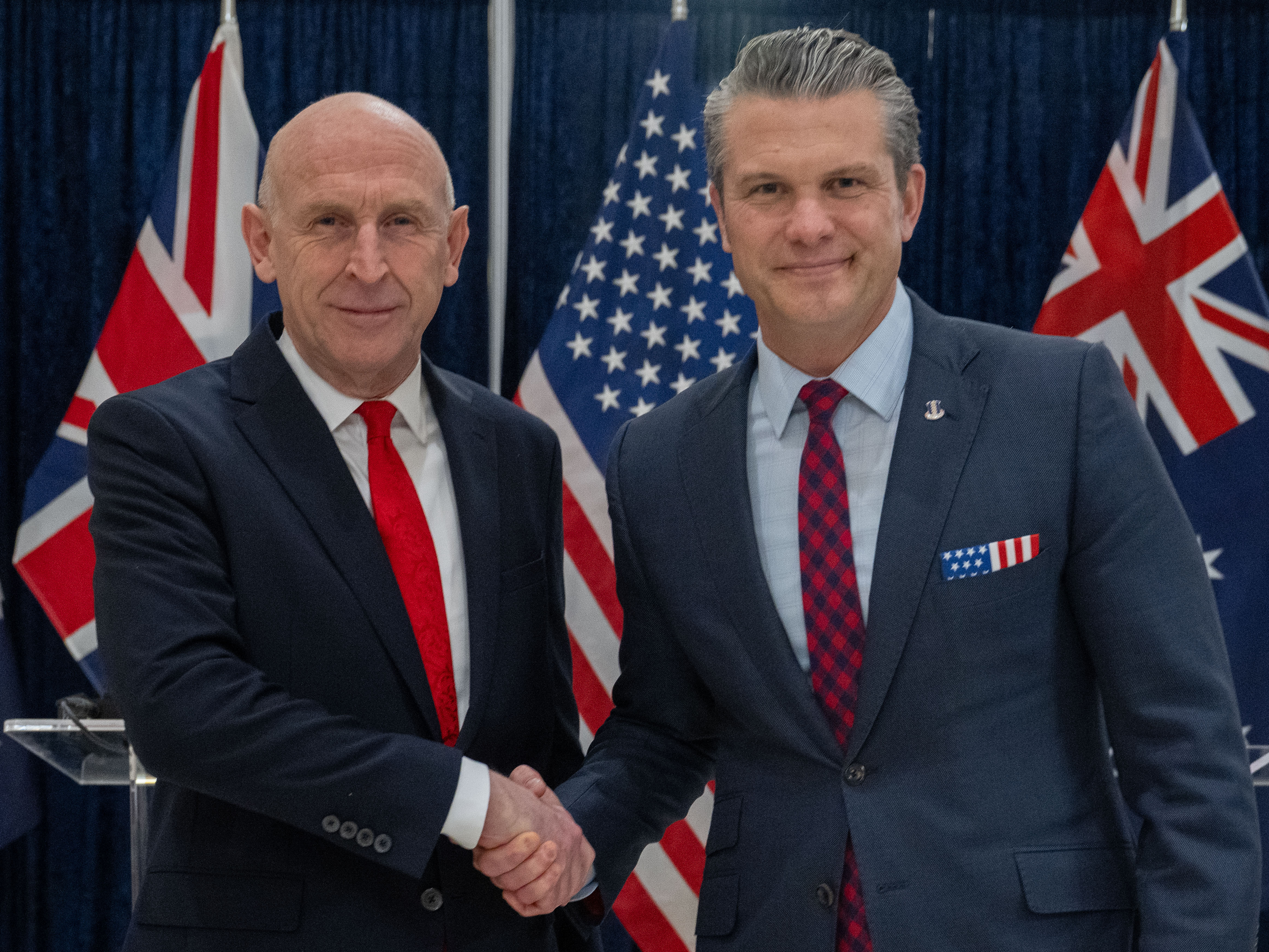
Healey with US Secretary of Defense Pete Hegseth on 10 December 2025

In March 2026, the United States launched attacks on Iran following weeks of prolonged military build-up, including in the United Kingdom. A subsequent war ensued in which Iran responded by launching ballistic missiles and drone strikes on targets in and around the Arabian peninsula, including RAF Akrotiri on Cyprus. Healey and the UK government was criticised for inaction and a perceived lack of readiness by Cyprus leadership. Following the assassination of Ayatollah Ali Khamenei in Israeli-led strikes, Healey stated that "few people will mourn" the Iranian leader, describing his regime as a "source of evil" that sponsored terror in the West.

=== Defence spending disputes and resignation ===
On 11 June 2026, Healey resigned as the British Secretary of State for Defence, citing disagreements with the government's defence spending plans. In his resignation letter, he argued that the Defence Investment Plan agreed by Chancellor of the Exchequer Rachel Reeves and HM Treasury was insufficient to meet the United Kingdom's growing security commitments and strategic defence objectives. Healey contended that the settlement delayed necessary investment, would reduce military readiness, and risked leaving the Armed Forces under-resourced amid increasing international threats. Healey highlighted that global operational demands on British forces had spiked sharply owing to the outbreak of the 2026 Iran war and the critical need to secure the Strait of Hormuz. He stated that because Starmer was "unable" and the Treasury "unwilling" to match the funding required for this highly unstable security environment, he was left with no option but to step down rather than compromise national safety. While praising the government's achievements in defence and reaffirming his support for the prime minister and the Labour government, he stated that he could not support a funding settlement that, in his view, failed to provide the resources required by the Armed Forces.

Healey cited the escalating war in Iran alongside the 2022 Russian invasion of Ukraine as a primary driver for his shock resignation. He warned that Starmer's refusal to adequately fund the military leaves the UK dangerously unprepared during a volatile global crisis. Numerous media outlets reported the resignation of Healey as shock and sudden, and reported the substantial impact it would have on Starmer's premiership.

The Parliamentary Private Secretary (PPS) to Healey, Pamela Nash, also resigned on 11 June, writing in her resignation letter that "delays and difficulties with securing the necessary funding to progress the defence investment plan has been the latest issue that is damaging to the trust of the public in us".

Later on the same day, Armed Forces minister Al Carns also resigned over disagreements with the defence investment plan. In his resignation letter, Carns stated that "the character of conflict is changing faster than our procurement can keep up with", and criticised the defence investment plan, arguing that it was "not built for the threat we face" and was "neither transformative enough nor sufficiently funded."

== Chancellorship (since 2026) ==
=== Appointment ===
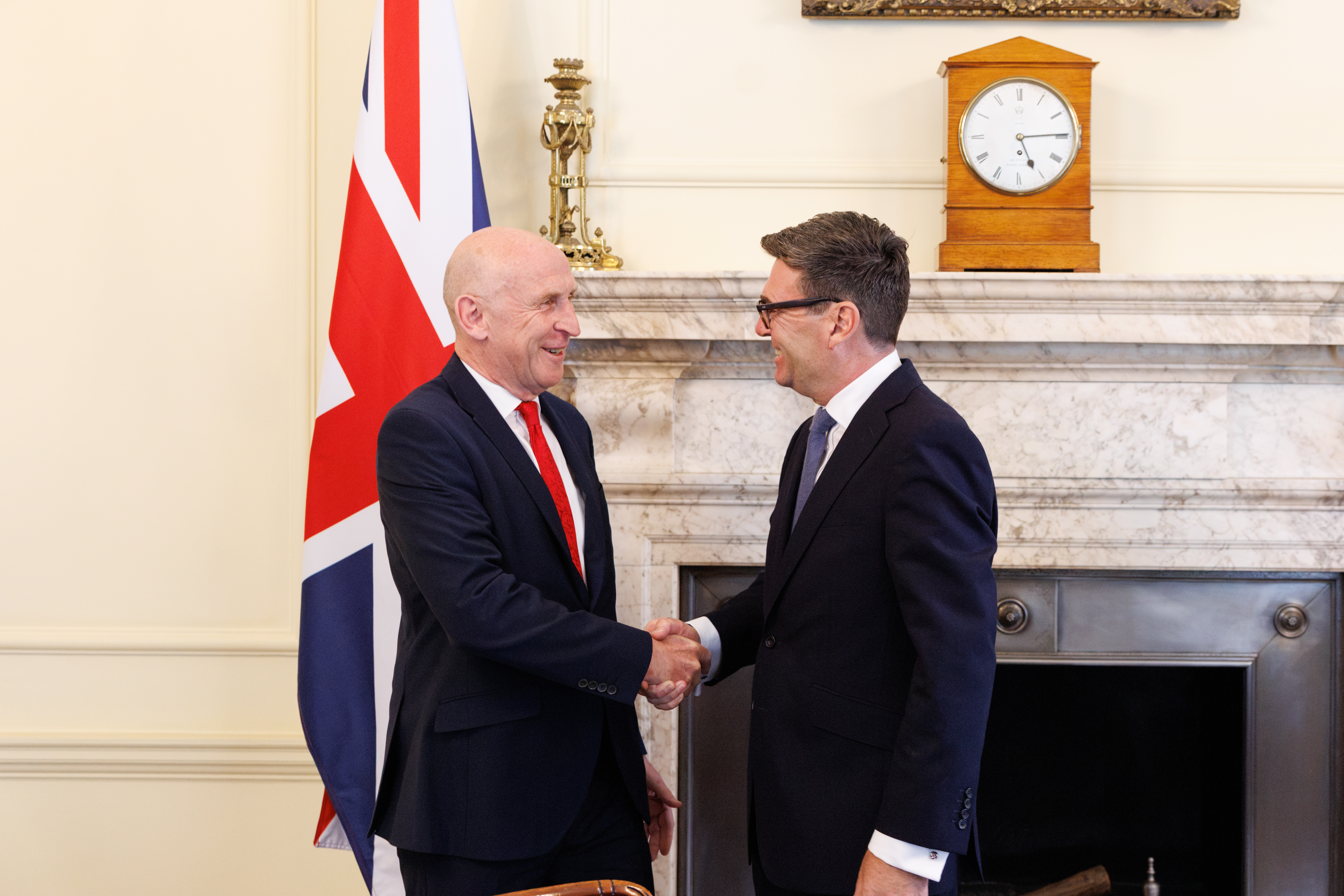
Healey being appointed as Chancellor of the Exchequer by Prime Minister Andy Burnham on 20 July 2026.

On 20 July 2026, prime minister Andy Burnham appointed Healey as Chancellor of the Exchequer, succeeding Rachel Reeves.

In a phone call to NATO Secretary General Mark Rutte, Burnham told Rutte that appointing a former Defence Secretary as Chancellor of the Exchequer was "a signal of [Burnham's] intent" to send a "strong signal of unity [...] to the world in such volatile times".

=== Tenure ===
Shortly after taking office, Healey insisted in a cabinet meeting that the government would maintain "fiscal discipline". The government under Burnham and Healey also announced that they would scrap the proposed Digital ID, and instead use the funds to cut VAT on electricity bills at a cost of £850 million.

Healey presented his first budget to the House of the Commons in October 2026. Healey had resigned as Defence Secretary in June over insufficient Treasury funding, yet after becoming Chancellor he continued with the same funding level for defence that he had rejected in his former role.

== Personal life ==
Healey married Jackie Bate on 25 October 1993 in Lambeth. She comes from a line of Labour activists. When they met, Jackie worked in Labour HQ, while Healey worked for the MSF Union. They met at a union conference, and within two weeks they were engaged. Together they have one son.

Parliament of the United Kingdom
Preceded by Peter Hardy	Member of Parliament for Wentworth; 1997–2010	Constituency abolished
New constituency	Member of Parliament for Wentworth and Dearne; 2010–2024	Constituency abolished
New constituency	Member of Parliament for Rawmarsh and Conisbrough; 2024–present	Incumbent
Political offices
Preceded by Jacqui Smith	Parliamentary Under-Secretary of State for Adult Skills; 2001–2002	Succeeded by Ivan Lewis
Preceded by Ruth Kelly	Economic Secretary to the Treasury; 2002–2005	Succeeded by Ivan Lewis
Preceded by Stephen Timms	Financial Secretary to the Treasury; 2005–2007	Succeeded by Jane Kennedy
Preceded by Phil Woolas	Minister of State for Local Government; 2007–2009	Succeeded by Rosie Winterton
Preceded by Margaret Beckett	Minister of State for Housing and Planning; 2009–2010	Succeeded by Grant Shapps
Preceded by Grant Shapps	Shadow Minister for Housing and Local Government; 2010	Succeeded by Alison Seabeck
Preceded by Andy Burnham	Shadow Secretary of State for Health; 2010–2011	Succeeded by Andy Burnham
Preceded by Roberta Blackman-Woods	Shadow Minister for Housing and Planning; 2015–2016	Vacant
New office	Shadow Secretary of State for Housing; 2016–2020	Succeeded by Thangam Debbonaire
Preceded by Nia Griffith	Shadow Secretary of State for Defence; 2020–2024	Succeeded by James Cartlidge
Preceded by Grant Shapps	Secretary of State for Defence; 2024–2026	Succeeded by Dan Jarvis
Preceded by Rachel Reeves	Chancellor of the Exchequer; 2026–present	Incumbent
