= Rother Valley (constituency) =

Parliamentary constituency in the United Kingdom, 1918 onwards

Coordinates: 53.37°N 1.22°W

- County constituency for the House of Commons
- Boundaries since 2024
- Boundary of Rother Valley in Yorkshire and the Humber
- County: South Yorkshire
- Electorate: 74,050 (December 2019)
- Major settlements: Maltby; Rotherham (part); Dinnington; Aston cum Aughton

Current constituency
- Created: 1918
- Member of Parliament: Jake Richards (Labour)
- Seats: One
- Created from: Doncaster and Rotherham

Rother Valley is a constituency represented in the House of Commons of the UK Parliament by Jake Richards, a member of the Labour Party.

== Constituency profile ==
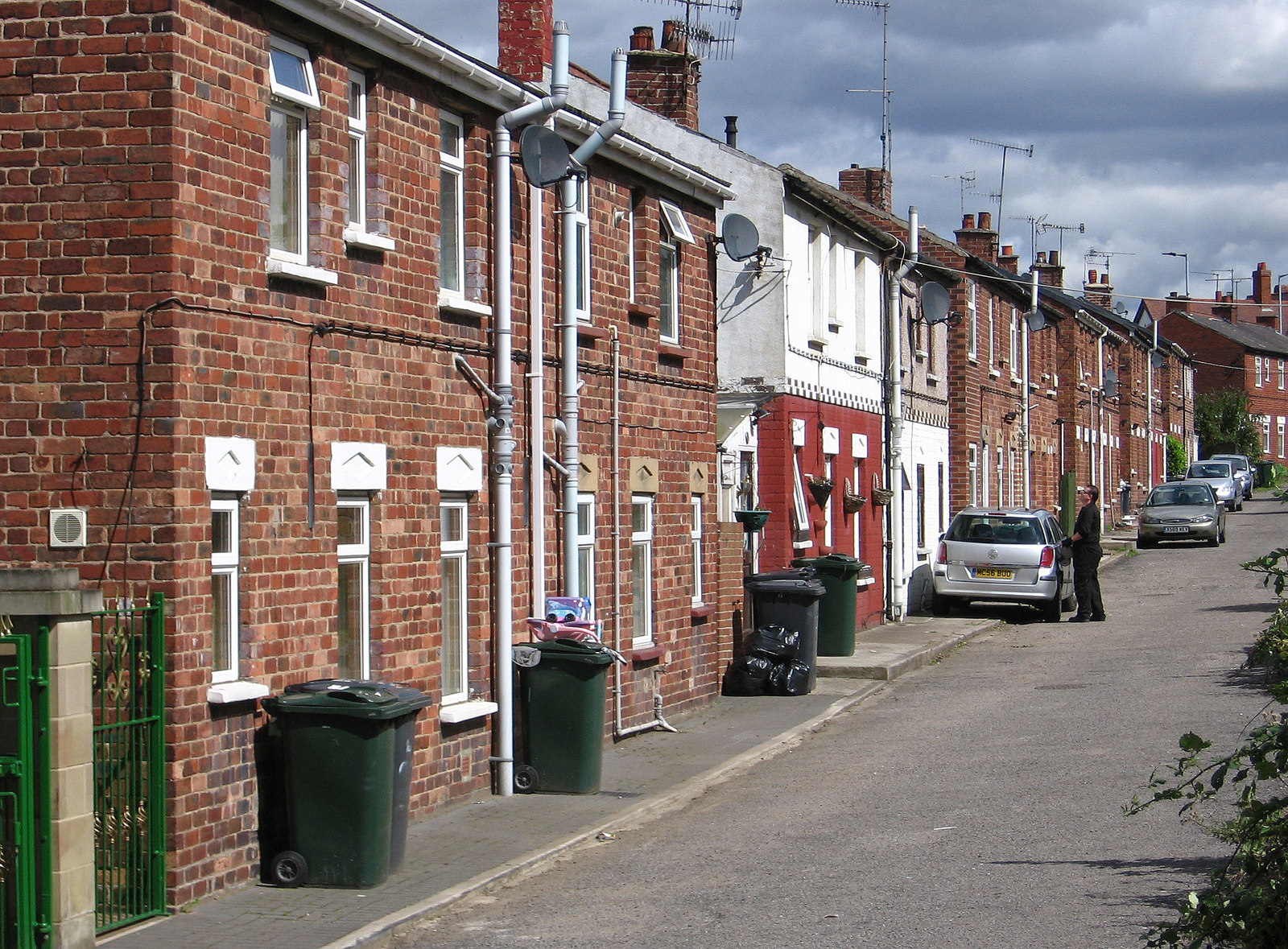
Millindale, Maltby

Rother Valley is a constituency in South Yorkshire in England, forming part of the Metropolitan Borough of Rotherham. It is named after the River Rother, which forms part of its western boundary. If taken together with the connected village of Anston, Dinnington is the constituency's largest town, with a population of around 21,000. Other settlements include the town of Maltby and the villages of Aston cum Aughton, Wales, Kiveton Park, Thurcroft, Whiston and Wickersley.

This constituency covers the towns, villages and rural areas to the east of Sheffield and Rotherham. This is traditionally a coal mining region; the settlements here were historically small farming communities but grew rapidly during the Edwardian era after coal was discovered in the area. The decline of the mining industry in the late 20th century affected Rother Valley; Dinnington, Maltby and Thurcroft remain highly-deprived today with most residents living in small terraced or semi-detached properties built to house industrial workers. The rural parts of the constituency are wealthier and Whiston functions as an affluent suburb of Rotherham. This gives the constituency an average level of wealth overall. House prices across the constituency are generally similar to the rest of Yorkshire but lower than the UK average.

Rother Valley has a below-average young adult population and a high proportion of retirees. Residents have below-average rates of income but high levels of homeownership. The child poverty rate is higher than the UK-wide rate. Residents have low levels of education and a high proportion work in the manufacturing, education and construction industries. The percentage claiming unemployment benefits is low. White people made up 95% of the population at the 2021 census.

At the local borough council, most of the constituency is represented by Conservatives. Some Labour Party councillors were elected in Aston cum Aughton, and Wales and Kiveton Park elected independents. Voters in Rother Valley strongly supported leaving the European Union in the 2016 referendum; an estimated 66% voted in favour of Brexit compared to the UK-wide figure of 52%.

== History ==
This constituency was created by the Representation of the People Act 1918. Unusually in the light of the events of the Labour Party's early 20th-century years, the seat had been represented by a member of that party continuously since the seat was formed. The size of the majorities historically have not been particularly marginal in the elections, until the 2017 general election in which the majority was less than 4,000 votes. Nonetheless, this was still considered a safe seat for the party, until the 2019 general election in which the Conservatives won the seat for the first time. Labour regained the seat at the 2024 general election.

== Boundaries ==
=== Historic ===
Map of 2010-2024 boundaries

1918–1950: The Urban Districts of Handsworth; and Swinton; and the Rural Districts of Kiveton Park; and part of Rotherham.

1950–1983: The Urban Districts of Maltby; and Rawmarsh; and the Rural Districts of Kiveton Park; and Rotherham.

1983–2010: The Borough of Rotherham wards of: Anston and Woodsetts, Aston, Orgreave and Ulley, Brinsworth, Catcliffe and Treeton, Kiveton Park, Maltby, St. John’s and Thurcroft and Whiston.

2010–2024: The Metropolitan Borough of Rotherham wards of: Anston and Woodsetts; Dinnington; Hellaby; Holderness; Maltby; Rother Vale; Sitwell; and Wales

Parliament accepted the Boundary Commission's Fifth Periodic Review of Westminster constituencies which slightly altered this constituency for the 2010 general election.

=== Current ===
Following the 2023 periodic review of Westminster constituencies which came into effect for the 2024 general election, the constituency comprises the following:

- The Metropolitan Borough of Rotherham wards of: Anston & Woodsetts; Aston & Todwick; Aughton & Swallownest; Dinnington; Hellaby & Maltby West; Maltby East; Sitwell; Thurcroft & Wickersley South; Wales.

Minor changes to reflect modification of local authority ward boundaries.

Rother Valley constituency covers an area in the Metropolitan Borough of Rotherham south of Rotherham itself. It is bordered by the constituencies of Bassetlaw, Bolsover, Derbyshire North East, Don Valley, Rotherham, Sheffield South East, and Wentworth and Dearne.

== Members of Parliament ==
Election	Member	Party
1918	Thomas Walter Grundy	Labour
1935	Edward Dunn	Labour
1945	David Griffiths	Labour
1970	Peter Hardy	Labour
1983	Kevin Barron	Labour
2019	Alexander Stafford	Conservative
2024	Jake Richards	Labour

== Elections ==
Rother Valley general election results 1918–2017

=== Elections in the 2020s ===
General election 2024: Rother Valley
Party	Candidate	Votes	%	±%
Labour	Jake Richards	16,023	38.5	+5.9
Conservative	Alexander Stafford	15,025	36.1	−10.0
Reform	Tony Harrison	7,679	18.5	+6.8
Green	Paul Martin	1,706	4.1	+1.6
Liberal Democrats	Colin Taylor	1,175	2.8	−2.0
Majority		998	2.4	N/A
Turnout		41,608	59.9	−4.9
Registered electors		69,460		
Labour gain from Conservative		Swing	+8.0	

=== Elections in the 2010s ===
2019 notional result
Party	Vote	%
Conservative	20,975	46.1
Labour	14,840	32.6
Brexit Party	5,314	11.7
Liberal Democrats	2,195	4.8
Green	1,124	2.5
Others	1,040	2.3
Turnout	45,488	64.8
Electorate	70,184	

General election 2019: Rother Valley
Party	Candidate	Votes	%	±%
Conservative	Alexander Stafford	21,970	45.1	+4.8
Labour	Sophie Wilson	15,652	32.1	−16.0
Brexit Party	Allen Cowles	6,264	12.9	N/A
Liberal Democrats	Colin Taylor	2,553	5.2	+2.9
Green	Emily West	1,219	2.5	+0.7
Independent	Nigel Short	1,040	2.1	N/A
Majority		6,318	13.0	N/A
Turnout		48,698	65.1	−0.7
Conservative gain from Labour		Swing	+10.4	

General election 2017: Rother Valley
Party	Candidate	Votes	%	±%
Labour	Kevin Barron	23,821	48.1	+4.5
Conservative	Bethan Eddy	19,939	40.3	+17.0
UKIP	Lee Hunter	3,704	7.5	−20.6
Liberal Democrats	Katie Pruszynski	1,155	2.3	−1.9
Green	Paul Martin	869	1.8	N/A
Majority		3,882	7.8	−7.7
Turnout		49,595	65.8	+2.5
Labour hold		Swing	−6.3	

General election 2015: Rother Valley
Party	Candidate	Votes	%	±%
Labour	Kevin Barron	20,501	43.6	+2.7
UKIP	Allen Cowles	13,204	28.1	+22.5
Conservative	Gareth Streeter	10,945	23.3	−5.1
Liberal Democrats	Robert Teal	1,992	4.2	−13.1
English Democrat	Sharon Pilling	377	0.8	N/A
Majority		7,297	15.5	+3.0
Turnout		47,019	63.3	−0.9
Labour hold		Swing	−9.9	

General election 2010: Rother Valley
Party	Candidate	Votes	%	±%
Labour	Kevin Barron	19,147	40.9	−10.6
Conservative	Lynda Donaldson	13,281	28.4	+5.3
Liberal Democrats	Wesley Paxton	8,111	17.3	+1.2
BNP	William Blair	3,616	7.7	+2.8
UKIP	Tina Dowdall	2,613	5.6	+1.3
Majority		5,866	12.5	−23.5
Turnout		46,768	64.2	+6.5
Labour hold		Swing	−8.0	

=== Elections in the 2000s ===
General election 2005: Rother Valley
Party	Candidate	Votes	%	±%
Labour	Kevin Barron	21,871	55.4	−6.7
Conservative	Colin Phillips	7,647	19.4	−2.3
Liberal Democrats	Phil Bristow	6,272	15.9	+3.4
BNP	Nick Cass	2,020	5.1	N/A
UKIP	Gordon Brown	1,685	4.3	+0.6
Majority		14,224	36.0	−4.4
Turnout		39,495	58.1	+4.9
Labour hold		Swing	−2.2	

General election 2001: Rother Valley
Party	Candidate	Votes	%	±%
Labour	Kevin Barron	22,851	62.1	−5.5
Conservative	James Duddridge	7,969	21.7	+5.0
Liberal Democrats	Win Knight	4,603	12.5	+0.9
UKIP	David Cutts	1,380	3.7	N/A
Majority		14,882	40.4	−10.5
Turnout		36,803	53.2	−14.1
Labour hold		Swing		

=== Elections in the 1990s ===
General election 1997: Rother Valley
Party	Candidate	Votes	%	±%
Labour	Kevin Barron	31,184	67.6	+6.1
Conservative	Steven Stanbury	7,699	16.7	−10.2
Liberal Democrats	Stan Burgess	5,342	11.6	−1.1
Referendum	Stephen Cook	1,932	4.2	N/A
Majority		23,485	50.9	+17.3
Turnout		46,157	67.3	−7.7
Labour hold		Swing		

General election 1992: Rother Valley
Party	Candidate	Votes	%	±%
Labour	Kevin Barron	30,977	60.5	+4.1
Conservative	G. Toby A.W. Horton	13,755	26.9	+2.0
Liberal Democrats	Kevin A. Smith	6,483	12.7	−5.7
Majority		17,222	33.6	+2.1
Turnout		51,215	75.0	−0.6
Labour hold		Swing	+1.1	

=== Elections in the 1980s ===
General election 1987: Rother Valley
Party	Candidate	Votes	%	±%
Labour	Kevin Barron	28,292	56.4	+9.9
Conservative	Paul Rayner	12,502	24.9	−3.2
SDP	John Boddy	9,240	18.4	−7.0
Workers Revolutionary	Michael Driver	145	0.3	N/A
Majority		15,790	31.5	+13.1
Turnout		50,179	75.6	+3.7
Labour hold		Swing		

General election 1983: Rother Valley
Party	Candidate	Votes	%	±%
Labour	Kevin Barron	21,781	46.5	
Conservative	John Derrick	13,156	28.1	
SDP	John Boddy	11,903	25.4	
Majority		8,625	18.4	
Turnout		46,840	71.9	
Labour hold		Swing		

=== Elections in the 1970s ===
General election 1979: Rother Valley
Party	Candidate	Votes	%	±%
Labour	Peter Hardy	45,986	62.2	−5.1
Conservative	R. Barber	19,984	27.0	+9.1
Liberal	C. Sykes	7,937	10.7	−4.1
Majority		26,002	35.2	−14.2
Turnout		73,907	74.6	+2.4
Labour hold		Swing		

General election October 1974: Rother Valley
Party	Candidate	Votes	%	±%
Labour	Peter Hardy	44,670	67.3	−6.1
Conservative	Gary Waller	11,893	17.9	−8.7
Liberal	Geoffrey Reid	9,828	14.8	N/A
Majority		32,777	49.4	+2.6
Turnout		66,391	72.2	−6.4
Labour hold		Swing		

General election February 1974: Rother Valley
Party	Candidate	Votes	%	±%
Labour	Peter Hardy	52,532	73.4	+1.6
Conservative	Gary Waller	19,058	26.6	−1.6
Majority		33,474	46.8	+3.2
Turnout		71,590	78.6	+8.0
Labour hold		Swing		

General election 1970: Rother Valley
Party	Candidate	Votes	%	±%
Labour	Peter Hardy	44,322	71.8	−5.0
Conservative	Tony Durant	17,418	28.2	+5.0
Majority		26,904	43.6	−10.0
Turnout		61,740	70.6	−2.9
Labour hold		Swing		

=== Elections in the 1960s ===
General election 1966: Rother Valley
Party	Candidate	Votes	%	±%
Labour	David Griffiths	43,634	76.82	+2.40
Conservative	J Michael Clarke	13,167	23.18	−2.40
Majority		30,467	53.64	+4.80
Turnout		56,801	73.46	+3.93
Labour hold		Swing	+2.40	

General election 1964: Rother Valley
Party	Candidate	Votes	%	±%
Labour	David Griffiths	43,101	74.4	+0.3
Conservative	Raymond Whitley Hadfield	14,813	25.6	−0.3
Majority		28,288	48.8	+0.6
Turnout		57,914	77.4	−5.4
Labour hold		Swing		

=== Elections in the 1950s ===
General election 1959: Rother Valley
Party	Candidate	Votes	%	±%
Labour	David Griffiths	43,962	74.1	−1.5
Conservative	William Albert V Hoskins	15,369	25.9	+1.5
Majority		28,593	48.2	−3.0
Turnout		59,331	82.8	+4.0
Labour hold		Swing		

General election 1955: Rother Valley
Party	Candidate	Votes	%	±%
Labour	David Griffiths	39,968	75.6	−0.1
Conservative	William Albert V Hoskins	12,916	24.4	+0.1
Majority		27,052	51.2	−0.2
Turnout		52,884	78.8	−7.5
Labour hold		Swing		

General election 1951: Rother Valley
Party	Candidate	Votes	%	±%
Labour	David Griffiths	41,990	75.7	−0.9
Conservative	Ronald Hall	13,470	24.3	+0.9
Majority		28,520	51.4	−1.8
Turnout		55,460	86.3	−1.1
Labour hold		Swing		

General election 1950: Rother Valley
Party	Candidate	Votes	%	±%
Labour	David Griffiths	42,222	76.6	+1.4
Conservative	William Robert Ackrill Breare	12,887	23.4	−1.4
Majority		29,335	53.2	+2.8
Turnout		55,109	87.4	+12.2
Labour hold		Swing		

=== Elections in the 1940s ===
General election 1945: Rother Valley
Party	Candidate	Votes	%	±%
Labour	David Griffiths	44,449	75.2	+3.2
Conservative	J. Howard Bull	14,669	24.8	−3.2
Majority		29,830	50.4	+6.4
Turnout		59,118	75.2	+1.4
Labour hold		Swing		

=== Elections in the 1930s ===
General election 1935: Rother Valley
Party	Candidate	Votes	%	±%
Labour	Edward Dunn	33,271	72.0	+9.7
Conservative	Alwyne Gervase Olliver	12,907	28.0	−9.7
Majority		20,364	44.0	+19.4
Turnout		46,178	73.8	−3.7
Labour hold		Swing		

General election 1931: Rother Valley
Party	Candidate	Votes	%	±%
Labour	Thomas Walter Grundy	26,185	62.3	−14.0
Conservative	Alwyne Gervase Olliver	15,812	37.7	+14.0
Majority		10,373	24.6	−28.0
Turnout		41,997	77.5	−0.3
Labour hold		Swing		

=== Elections in the 1920s ===
General election 1929: Rother Valley
Party	Candidate	Votes	%	±%
Labour	Thomas Walter Grundy	30,405	76.3	+11.0
Unionist	Cecil Pike	9,460	23.7	−11.0
Majority		20,945	52.6	+22.0
Turnout		39,865	77.8	+1.9
Labour hold		Swing	+11.0	

General election 1924: Rother Valley
Party	Candidate	Votes	%	±%
Labour	Thomas Walter Grundy	18,750	65.3	−3.3
Unionist	Frances R. Wade	9,985	34.7	+3.3
Majority		8,765	30.6	−6.6
Turnout		28,735	75.9	+11.9
Labour hold		Swing		

General election 1923: Rother Valley
Party	Candidate	Votes	%	±%
Labour	Thomas Walter Grundy	15,967	68.6	N/A
Unionist	Frances R. Wade	7,323	31.4	N/A
Majority		8,644	37.2	N/A
Turnout		39,865	64.0	N/A
Labour hold		Swing		

General election 1922: Rother Valley
Party	Candidate	Votes	%	±%
Labour	Thomas Walter Grundy	Unopposed		
Labour hold				

=== Elections in the 1910s ===
General election 1918: Rother Valley
Party		Candidate	Votes	%	±%
	Labour	Thomas Walter Grundy	9,917	55.1	
C	National Democratic	Ernest George Bearcroft	4,894	27.2	
	Liberal	Albert Edward Mann Turner	3,177	17.7	
Majority			5,023	27.9	
Turnout			17,988	56.3	
	Labour win (new seat)				
C indicates candidate endorsed by the coalition government.

== See also ==
- Parliamentary constituencies in South Yorkshire
- Parliamentary constituencies in Yorkshire and the Humber

== Sources ==
- BBC News, Election 2005
- BBC News, Vote 2001
- Guardian Unlimited Politics
- Leigh Rayment's Historical List of MPs – Constituencies beginning with "R" (part 2)
- Election results from 1951 to the present
- F. W. S. Craig, British Parliamentary Election Results 1918 – 1949
- F. W. S. Craig, British Parliamentary Election Results 1950 – 1970
