= Treeton =

Village and civil parish in South Yorkshire, England

Coordinates: 53.384501°N 1.351273°W

- Village and civil parish
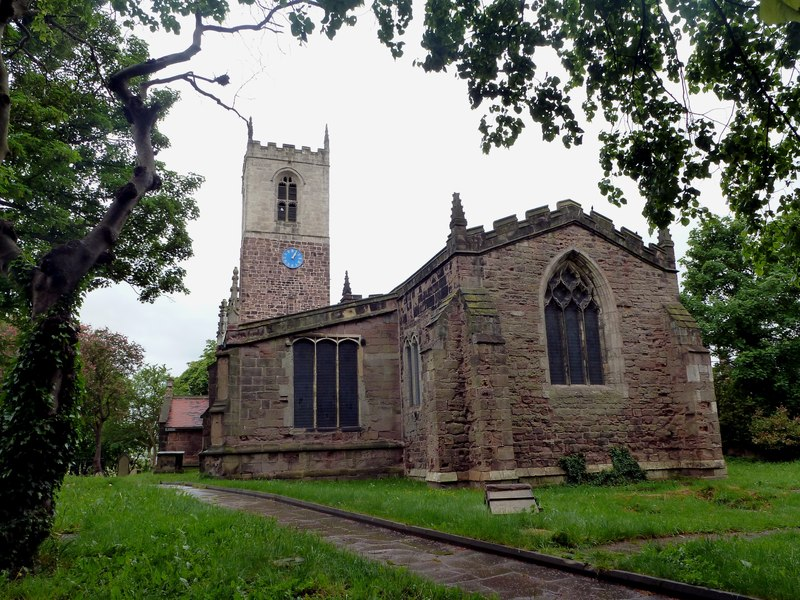
- St Helens Church

- Location within South Yorkshire
- Population: 3,189 (2011 Census)
- Civil parish: Treeton
- Metropolitan borough: Rotherham
- Metropolitan county: South Yorkshire
- Region: Yorkshire and the Humber
- Country: England
- Sovereign state: United Kingdom
- Post town: ROTHERHAM
- Postcode district: S60
- Dialling code: 0114
- Police: South Yorkshire
- Fire: South Yorkshire
- Ambulance: Yorkshire
- UK Parliament: Rother Valley
- Website: https://www.treetonparishcouncil.gov.uk/

Treeton is a village and civil parish of the Metropolitan Borough of Rotherham in South Yorkshire, England. It is located about 4 miles (6 km) south of the town of Rotherham and 5 miles (8 km) east of Sheffield City Centre.

== History ==
There is evidence of Mesolithic and Neolithic settlement in this area. In 1954 a Neolithic polished stone axe was found at Gregory Hill Field, and in 1957 Mesolithic flint cores were found in Treeton Wood. There was a Roman fort at Templeborough, about 2.8 miles (4.5 km) north west of Treeton, and remnants of the Roman road called Icknield Street (sometimes Ryknild or Riknild Street) have been found in nearby Brinsworth.

The name Treeton is Old English in origin and may mean 'tree farmstead' or 'farmstead built with posts'. The earliest known written record of Treeton is the Domesday Book of 1086, in which it is referred to as Trectone or Tretone. The Domesday Book also mentions that the village had two mills and a church. The present parish church the Church of St Helen was originally built in the 12th century, but may have included parts of an earlier church. The church was expanded in the 14th century and extensively restored in the 19th century.

The North Midland Railway built a railway through the village in 1840, this later became the Midland Railway. There was a station at Treeton until 1951. A colliery was built at Treeton starting in 1875, and 400 houses were built between 1881 and 1905 to house miners' families. Treeton Colliery closed in 1990 and the site has since been redeveloped for homes.

== Governance ==
Treeton is a civil parish governed locally by a Parish Council, one of 29 such councils in the Metropolitan Borough of Rotherham. It is in the Rother Vale Ward of the Borough, which is represented on the Borough Council by Georgina Boyes, Gerald Nightingale, and John Swift, all members of the Labour Party. This ward is part of the Rother Valley parliamentary constituency, and was represented in the House of Commons by MP Kevin Barron of the Labour Party who held the seat between 1983 and 2019. The Conservative MP, Alexander Stafford held the seat between the general elections of 2019 and 2024. Jake Richards (politician) of the Labour Party (UK) is the current MP.

== Geography ==
Treeton is situated on the east side of the River Rother, about 4 miles (6 km) south from the town of Rotherham and 5 miles (8 km) east from Sheffield City Centre. The village sits on the slopes of the Rother Valley, ranging from about 130 feet (40 m) to 260 feet (80 m) above mean sea level. The lower section of the village is susceptible to flooding and had to be evacuated during the floods of June 2007 because of fears that cracks in the dam at Ulley reservoir could lead to widespread flooding in the valley.

== Demography ==
At the time of the United Kingdom 2011 Census the population of Treeton civil parish was 3189 people. The ethnic mix was 97.0% white (White British, White Irish, or White Other), 0.9% mixed race, 1% Asian, 1% Black and 0.2% other. In comparison, the ethnic data found in the United Kingdom Census 2001 was 99.4% white (White British, White Irish, or White Other), 0.3% Asian, and 0.3% mixed race.

Table outlining population change of the parish in 50-year increments since 1801:

Year	1801	1851	1901	1951	2001
Population	628	663	1,969	2,040	2,514
Source: A Vision of Britain through Time

The figures for 1801 and 1851 are taken from the ancient parish of Treeton, which included the neighbouring villages of Ulley and Brampton-en-le-Morthen, an area about twice the size of the current civil parish.

== Landmarks ==
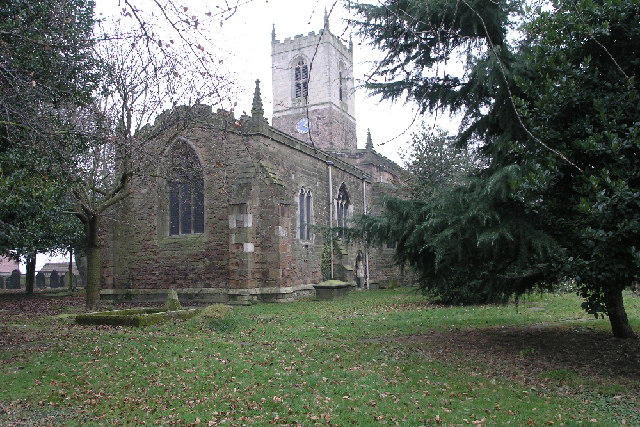
The Parish Church of St Helen, Treeton

The Church of St Helen is a Grade I listed building, and the village stocks outside the church are Grade II listed. Other Grade II listed buildings in the village include The Georgian House, formerly the church rectory, and 18th-century farm buildings on Station Road and at Spa House Farm.

Catcliffe Flash, to the west of the village, is a local nature reserve that is made up of a lake and marshland formed as the elevation of the land beside the River Rother dropped due to coal mining subsidence. To the south-east of the village are three areas of ancient woodland, Treeton Wood, Hail Mary Hill Wood, and Falconer Wood, which are managed as part of the South Yorkshire Forest.

== Transport ==
Street map of Treeton

The main road transport route through Treeton is the B6067. Treeton is situated close to the Sheffield Parkway and junction 33 of the M1 motorway. Bus services provided by First South Yorkshire and TM Travel link the village with Rotherham Town Centre and Sheffield City Centre, as well as the surrounding villages. The closest mainline railway stations are at Sheffield, Rotherham, and Meadowhall. The former route of the North Midland Railway runs through the village, and Treeton used to be served by a passenger station on this line, however the station closed in 1951 and the rail line is now freight only.

== See also ==
- Listed buildings in Treeton
