= River Rother, South Yorkshire =

River in South Yorkshire, England

River Rother
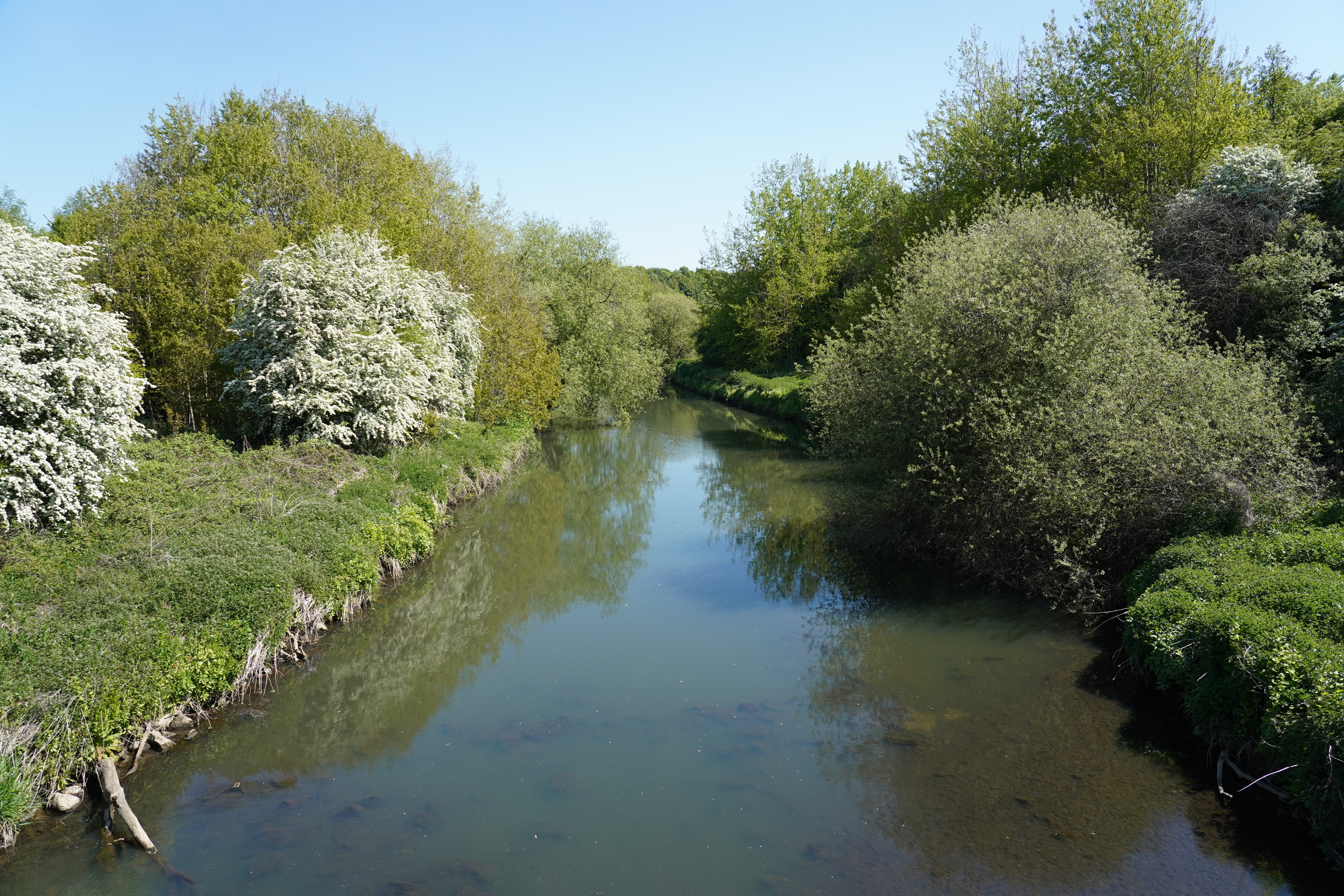

Location
- Country: England

Physical characteristics
- Source
  - location: Pilsley, Derbyshire
- Mouth
  - location: River Don, Rotherham
- Length: 26.9 mi (43.3 km)

The River Rother, a waterway in the northern England, gives its name to the town of Rotherham and to the Rother Valley parliamentary constituency. It rises in Pilsley in Derbyshire and flows in a generally northwards direction through the centre of Chesterfield, where it feeds the Chesterfield Canal, and on through the Rother Valley Country Park and several districts of Sheffield before joining the River Don at Rotherham in Yorkshire. Historically, it powered mills, mainly corn or flour mills, but most had ceased to operate by the early 20th century, and few of the mill buildings survive.

From the 1880s, the water quality deteriorated rapidly, as a result of coal mining and its associated communities. The river became unable to sustain life, and by 1974, was the most polluted of the rivers within the River Don catchment. The pollutants came from coking plants, from inefficient sewage treatment plants, and from the manufacture of chemicals. Major investment in upgrading the sewage treatment works took place, and in the treatment of industrial effluent before it was discharged to the river. The closure of the main coking plants has also aided the recovery of the river, and enabled restocking with fish to begin in 1994. By 1996, there was evidence for self-sustaining fish populations, and that the river could support organised angling.

A short section of the river in Chesterfield was once navigable, and may become so again as part of a development project, while there are plans to use the course from Rother Valley Country Park to Rotherham for the Rother Link, which would connect the Chesterfield Canal to the River Don Navigation. The lower river is managed because of flood risk: three regulators can restrict its flow. Their operation normally causes flooding of washlands, rather than of centres of population, which might otherwise be inundated.

== Etymology ==
The second element of the name 'Rother' is the Common Brittonic -duβr, meaning 'water' (Welsh dwfr). The first element could be rö-, an intensive Brittonic prefix meaning 'great', or rūδ, 'red, reddish-brown'.

== Course ==
=== Source and upper stream ===
The source of the river is at Pilsley near Clay Cross in Derbyshire, from where it flows to the west for a short distance, before turning to the north. The valley is shared with the Derby to Rotherham Railway, which makes the first two of a total of 20 crossings before the river reaches the eastern edges of Danesmoor. It is joined by another stream before passing to the west of North Wingfield, after which the Red Lead Mill Brook joins from the west. Before reaching Chesterfield, Birdholme Brook joins it from the west at Birdholme, Calow Brook joins from the east at Hady, and the River Hipper joins it on the southern edge of the town.

Within Chesterfield, the river was navigable, as the Chesterfield Canal joined the river and used it to access basins on the western bank. The first basin was connected to the river near Wharf Lane footbridge, but the coming of the railway severed the link, and a new basin was constructed to the north of the Brimington Road bridge in 1890. The canal company were not authorised by their Act of Parliament to use the river, but did so despite that. This stretch of the river forms part of a £300 million redevelopment project called Chesterfield Waterside, which will provide housing and amenities in an area which is currently derelict land. The project involves the creation of a short length of new canal to create an island in the centre of the site. A new basin has been constructed near the site of the 1890 basin, although it has not yet been connected to the river. Outline planning permission for the whole site was granted on 15 March 2010.

=== Below Chesterfield ===
Between Chesterfield and Tapton, the river flows over a large weir while the canal is protected from flooding by a flood gate. The two waterways remain close as they flow northwards between New Whittington and Brimington, where the River Drone joins from the west. At Old Whittington both turn to the east, before turning north again at Staveley. Just before Renishaw, the river passes Slittingmill Farm, once the site of a slitting mill constructed by George Sitwell in the 1650s, used to split iron bars from his furnaces into thin strips for the production of nails, and the first to be constructed in the East Midlands. After the River Doe Lea joins the Rother from the east, the river is crossed by a grade II listed two-arched bridge built around 1840 by the North Midland Railway, which carries a minor road to the golf course.

It continues to the east of Eckington and the west of Killamarsh, to arrive at the Rother Valley Country Park, where the course is largely man-made, as the park is part of a flood-defence scheme. The river was diverted to run close to the railway to the west while 1.7 million tonnes of coal from the reserves under the park were removed by open cast mining between 1976 and 1981. The channel was then rebuilt once mining had ceased and the pit had been filled in. The visitor centre uses a part of Bedgreave Mill, which was originally constructed around 1100, and is one of the first mills known to have been built on the River Don and its tributaries.

To the north of the site, the river powered Beighton Mill, which produced flour. The tail race, known as Beighton Mill Tail Goit, forms a separate channel to the east of the main channel for around 0.65 miles (1.05 km). Brookhouse Colliery, which was operational between 1929 and 1985, was located on the east bank of the tail goit, and the Pigeon Bridge Brook weaved its way through the site, passing under the railway tracks to join the tail goit. As the site developed, sections of it were culverted, and after the pit closed, the site became the Pit House West Opencast Site between 1989 and 1994. 300,000 tonnes of coal were obtained by reworking the spoil heaps from Brookhouse Colliery, and a further 1.2 million tonnes were obtained by opencast mining of the nine seams below the surface. Once extraction was completed, another year was spent landscaping the site. This included opening up the Pigeon Bridge Brook, constructing a series of ponds along its course to create a wetland habitat for wildlife, and re-routing the final section of the brook so that it joins the Rother further upstream, opposite the main lake of the Rother Valley Country Park. A significant proportion of the colliery site has been planted with trees, as part of the South Yorkshire Community Forest.

Beighton Mill Tail Goit is sufficiently large that it was designated as a main river by the Environment Agency. In 2015, they proposed that it should no longer be designated as such, although the main channel of the Rother would remain a main river. The move would transfer the responsibility for the tail goit from the Environment Agency to Rotherham Metropolitan Borough Council, who would then include it in their flood risk management plans. Continuing northwards, the river passes through the Sheffield districts of Beighton and Woodhouse, followed by the Rotherham districts of Catcliffe and Treeton, flowing on to its confluence with the River Don at Ickles, Rotherham.

Some sections of the river were highly polluted, so much so that when the Rother Valley Country Park was being created around the section north of Killamarsh and east of Beighton, cleaner water was brought in from The Moss to feed the park's lakes. The recent closures of industry and the work of the Environment Agency has improved the quality of the river Rother. The watercourse now holds a good head of coarse fish, and angling clubs are springing up along its length. Members of Ashfield Angling Club, which has fishing rights on the river near Orgreave, regularly catch chub, roach, barbel, and pike.

The planned Rother Link canal will use part of the river to connect the Sheffield and South Yorkshire Navigation to the Chesterfield Canal.

== Milling ==
Historically, the river has been used to power a number of mills, although little remains at most of the sites. The furthest upstream was Whitebank Mill, to the south-west of Spital. It was a corn mill in 1881, but the site was marked as Whitebank Yard by 1898. Spital Mills was a little further north, below the confluence with the Spital Brook and above the River Hipper. In the late 19th century, it was a tobacco mill, and was later known as Mason's Cigarette Works, but by 1918 cabinets were being manufactured there. The three-storey mill building has survived, and is now used by Spital Tile Company. To the east of Chesterfield railway station, there were two weirs and a second channel with sluices at both ends, but no sign of a mill building by 1881. Wheeldon Mill was located to the east of Whittington Moor, and was a flour mill in 1885. However, by 1898, the Great Central Railway's Chesterfield Loop line to Chesterfield Central railway station had been built through the site, and the main channel of the river had been moved to the west of the railway, to save the need for two bridges. Its name is retained in Wheeldonmill Lock on the Chesterfield Canal.

To the west of Staveley was Staveley Mill. It was a flour mill in 1885 and a corn mill in 1898. It was still in use in 1919, but by 1938, the river had been diverted along the course of the mill leat, and the main channel closed, to accommodate the ever-increasing railway sidings associated with Staveley Works. George Sitwell's slitting mill was located on the road from Eckington to Staveley, and was operational from around the 1620s. A weir fed water into the goit, a long channel which ran to the west of the main river to power the mill, while the main channel eventually ran to the east of the Midland Railway's North Midland Branch. The tail race from the mill continued northwards to the west of the railway, passing under the railway tracks serving Renishaw Park Collieries, rejoining the main river after it crossed back under the railway. Much of the tail goit, downstream of Slittingmill Farm, still holds water. Renishaw Mill was a flour mill, situated between the former Eckington railway station and the junction of the Smithy Brook with the Rother. A mill was recorded here in 1650, when there were two grist mills under a single roof. The weir and the head race had been removed by 1898.

Chapel Wheel was to the east of the river near Eckington, and was probably fed by Park Brook. However, a map of 1814 appears to show that the mill pond was filled with water taken from the Chesterfield Canal. Its name would suggest that it was used for grinding metal, but by 1898, the channel from the canal had been removed, as had the buildings below the dam. The outflow from Chapelwheel Dam flowed under the railway line to reach the right bank of the Rother. To the west of Netherthorpe, there was a corn mill in the 18th century. The Lord of the Manor for Killamarsh, Sacheverell Pole, sold it to William Cooper of Sheffield in 1795, and Cooper worked with an ironfounder called John Harrison to create an ironworks. They sold it to Joseph Butler in 1800, who built a forge and rolling mill on the site. Butler produced chains, spades and shovels. It was sold again in 1829 to Sir George Sitwell, who then leased it to Joseph Webster. At that time it included several crucible melting furnaces, a cementation furnace and tilt hammers which were water-powered. Webster improved the facilities, to enable him to produce high quality steel wire, used to make cables, hawsers and rigging for ships. In 1831 Webster obtained steam engines to power his rolling mills, and the forge was in operation until 1887. After that, wire continued to be made, and probably metal pipes were added to the output of the works. The original buildings have since been demolished, and modern buildings erected.

Bedgreave Mill was a corn mill and is now part of the visitor centre at Rother Valley Country Park. Two buildings survive, the first dating from the 16th or 17th century. A mill was recorded at Bedgreave, or Betgreave on early maps, in 1631, but the present building is enigmatic. It appears to date from the post-medieval period, but in concept is a medieval single-celled mill. The millstones were arranged on a platform at one end of the building, and the water wheel was below them. Very few mills with this arrangement survive. The second building dates from the mid to late 18th century. A new mill pond was mentioned in 1768, and this may have been the time at which the mill was constructed. It was a water-powered corn mill, but was converted to a steam-powered mill in 1886, after water from the mill leat was found to be leaking into nearby mines. The engine was housed in a single storey engine house. It remained in commercial operation producing animal fodder until 1947. It was restored in 1982 as part of the visitor centre, and retains much of its milling equipment, which can be seen by visitors to the park.

Beighton Mill was located to the north of Rother Valley Country Park. A second channel meanders northwards to the east of the main river, which is called Beighton Mill Tail Goit, although it is not obvious that water would have discharged into it after powering the mill. It was a corn mill in 1877 and 1898, by which time there was a large paper mill immediately to the north of it, served by its own railway siding. The paper mill was built in the 1880s, and was operational until 1926, but the corn mill building had been demolished by 1905. Woodhouse Mill Forge was a corn mill in the 17th and 18th centuries, but subsequently became a forge, producing spades until at least 1956. It was still identified on the 1975 map, but by that time the river had been diverted further to the west. Treeton Mill was a corn mill to the east of the river. A large weir fed water into a long mill pond, and the mill buildings were close to Mill Lane. Mill Goit carried the used water away, and rejoined the river on the southern edge of Catcliffe. The mill was disused in 1905, and only a row of mill cottages were identified in 1923. The main river channel had been moved eastwards and straightened by 1957, to accommodate railway sidings associated with Orgreave Colliery.

Canklow Corn Mill was fed by a long channel called Canklow Goit, diverging from the river close to where it is now crossed by the M1 motorway. The mill pond was also fed by the water from Ulley Brook and Whiston Brook. The mill was marked as disused in 1892, but not so in 1903. By 1923, the river channels had been altered, the mill building was gone, and parts of Canklow Goit had been filled in. The final mill on the river was Town Mill in Rotherham, located next to the Rotherham Old Brewery. It was a corn mill in 1893. It was a roller mill, originally water powered, but later powered by electricity. It was bought by Hovis in the 1950s but was destroyed by fire in 1963. It was rebuilt, continuing to operate until 2008, after which it was demolished.

== Flood defences ==
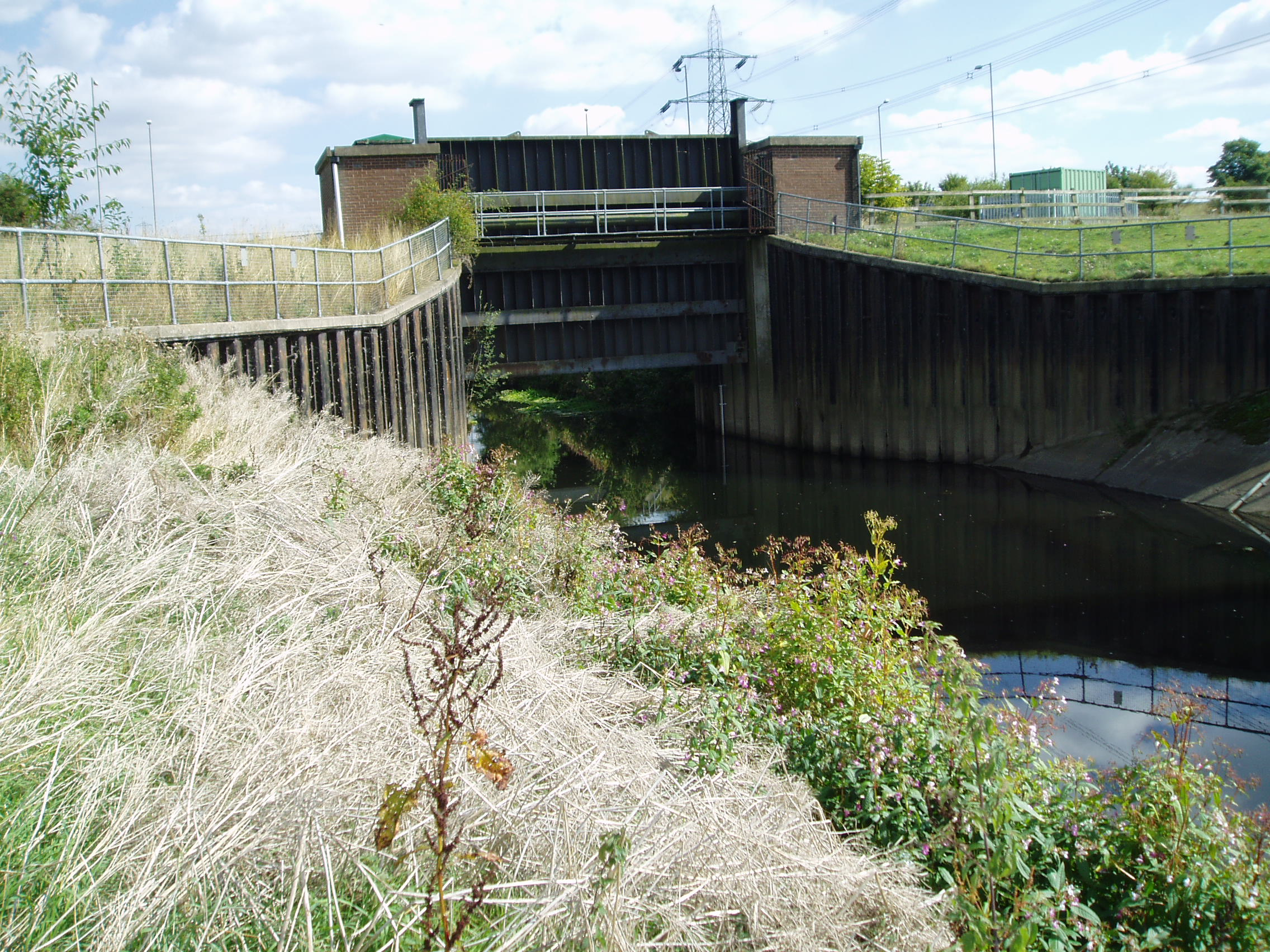
Canklow regulator is used to hold back the flow of the river in flood conditions

The River Rother is managed by the Environment Agency to mitigate flooding in the Catcliffe and Rotherham areas, through a series of regulators and washlands. The regulators are used to hold back the flow of the river, and the washlands consist of low-lying land adjacent to the river which flood when the flows are held back. This allows flood flows on the River Don to pass through Rotherham before the water from the Rother does so. There are three regulators, at Canklow, Woodhouse Mill and Meadowgate.

Prior to 1958, flooding was a persistent problem near the lower reaches of the river, with Beighton, Catcliffe, Treeton and Woodhouse Mill particularly at risk. When the River Rother Improvement Scheme was first proposed in September 1958, analysis of flood flows revealed that peak flows on the Rother generally reached the River Don at Rotherham after the peak flow on that river had already passed. Enlarging the channel of the Rother would have resulted in the peak flows reaching the Don earlier, effectively moving the problem of flooding downstream to Rotherham. The scheme therefore recognised the need to create and manage washlands to hold back the excess flow under these conditions.

=== Regulators ===
The first regulator to be installed was at Woodhouse Mill. It is a vertical sluice gate, and is situated at the downstream end of the Woodhouse Mill washlands nature reserve. A railway embankment crosses the nature reserve, and flood arches allow the water to flood both sides of the tracks. There are no floodbanks between the river and the reserve, which results in it flooding soon after the gate is closed. The mechanism here was manufactured by Ransomes and Rapier in 1956, and the regulator was commissioned in 1959. The Canklow regulator, situated close to the A630 link road from junction 33 on the M1 motorway, is also a vertical sluice gate, which when closed causes progressive flooding of seven washland areas on both sides of the M1, capable of holding 1,520,500 cubic metres (53,700,000 cu ft) of flood water. It was installed in 1969 as part of a major road-building project, which saw the M1 motorway and the A630 road built across the washlands.

The third regulator is at Meadowgate, within the boundaries of the Rother Valley Country Park. This provides an additional 1,100,000 cubic metres (39,000,000 cu ft) of storage capacity. and its operation results in progressive flooding of the Meadowgate Lake, the Nethermoor Lake and the main lakes. Levels within the park were carefully designed to allow it to flood in this way, and there are a number of sluices and flap gates so that stored water can be released back to the river in a controlled fashion. The regulator is of a different design to the other two, as the gate is located on the bed of the river, and rotates upwards as required. During a flood event, the Canklow regulator normally closes first, based on levels elsewhere within the Rother catchment, with the other two closing later on.

=== Floods ===
The Meadowgate regulator was operated in 2000, resulting in the Meadowgate and Nethermoor lake flooding, but water levels remained around 1 foot (30 cm) below the level at which the main lakes would flood.

The severe floods of 2007 were the result of some 80,000 megalitres of rainfall falling on South Yorkshire on 25 June 2007. The level of the River Rother at Rotherham reached the highest level ever recorded, at 5.71 metres (18.7 ft), and the regulators were staffed 24 hours a day in order to manage the water. However, there was a power failure at Canklow regulator, and the site had to be evacuated due to the threat posed by the possible breaching of the dam at Ulley Reservoir. The Meadowgate regulator was closed, and resulted in all four of the Rother Valley Country Park lakes flooding within the next 12 hours. Most of the car park and the watersports centre was also flooded, but water levels dropped over the next three days and little damage was caused. Assessment following those floods led the Environment Agency to conclude that the regulators were expensive to maintain, and that they should be removed once some of the flood banks had been remodelled to ensure that the washlands filled and emptied at the correct levels in a flood cycle.

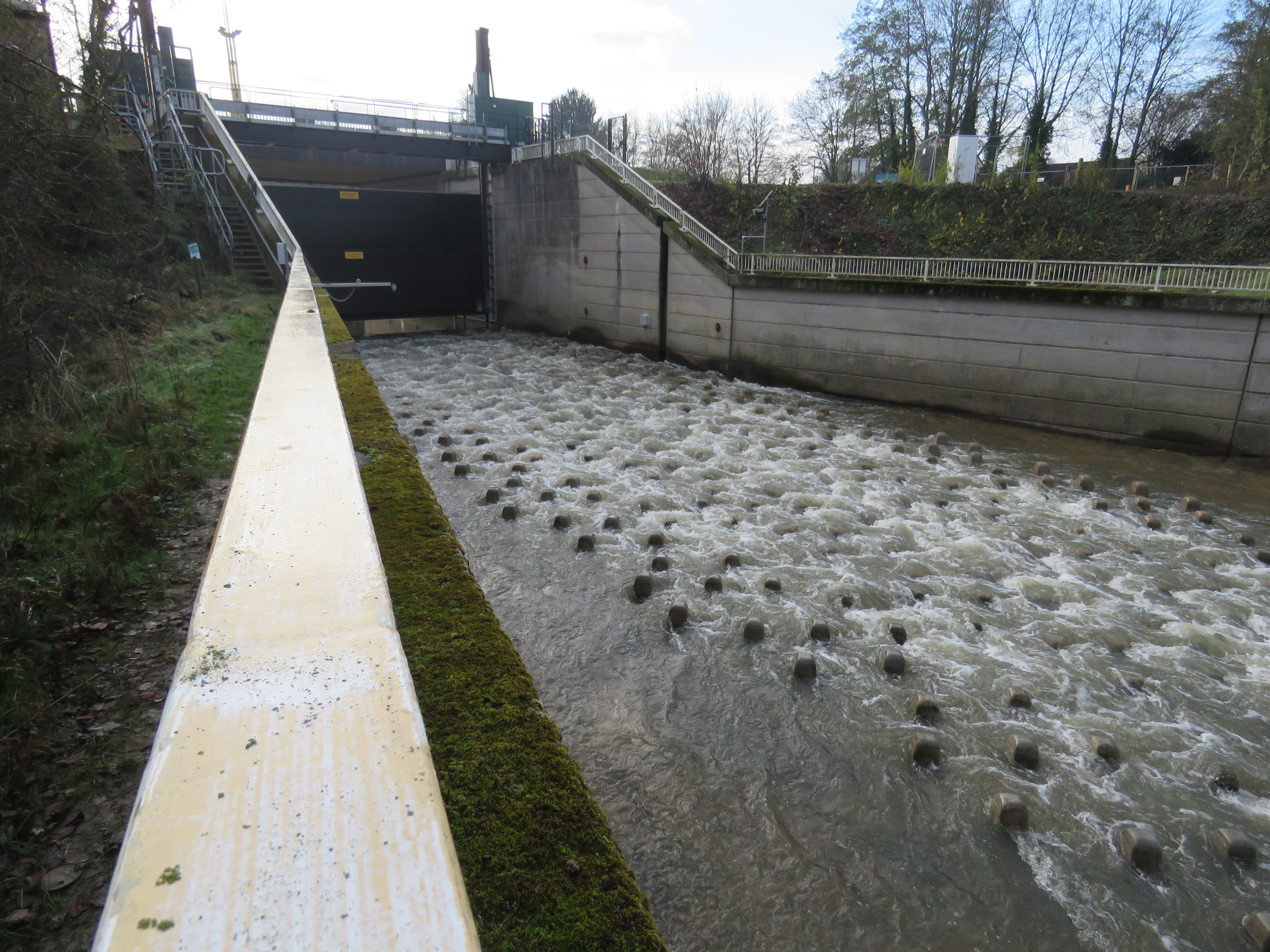
The new Meadowgate regulator, with the fish pass upstands visible above the water

However, by 2023 The Environment Agency had decided that the regulators should be refurbished, and the contract was awarded to JBA Bentley. The vertical gate at Canklow, which is raised and lowered by an electrically powered wire rope hoist, will be replaced with a new gate, with the project including new mechanical, electrical, instrumentation, control and automation (MEICA) systems. Some extra civil engineering work is also required, to improve the anchors holding the sheet-piling of the channel in place. A crane pad to allow the new gate to be placed in position, and to help with future maintenance had to be carefully positioned to avoid the high voltage overhead power lines crossing the site. The regulator at Woodhouse is expected to be decommissioned and replaced with a passive baffle or orifice plate once modelling of the site to determine their effectiveness has been completed.

The fish-bellied tilting gate at Meadowgate in Rother Valley Country Park, which was operated by a hydraulic ram, has been removed, and replaced by a vertical gate similar to that at Canklow. A temporary control room was constructed while the original buildings were demolished and a new control centre built, ensuring that the regulator remained operational for most of the project timescale. The new type of gate has enabled an improved fish pass to be provided in the channel. Because of the high flow rates during flood events, a solution using 80 pre-cast concrete tiles, each 6.6 by 8.2 feet (2 by 2.5 m) and weighing 4 tonnes was adopted. Upstands on the tiles ensure that there is suitable depth and velocity for fish over a wide range of river flows. To enable the work to proceed in the dry, the river was dammed upstream of the regulator and fed through a flume to discharge below the work site. The new regulator was operational from 21 December 2023.

During routine maintenance in August 2024, the gate at Woodhouse regulator failed in the lowered position. Three pumps were installed to pump water around the failed structure, but in November 2024 these were supplemented by four huge syphon pipes, capable of routing four times as much water around the gate. The Environment Agency stated at the time that they were working on a plan to allow the stuck gate to be raised, without damaging the rest of the structure.

== Water quality ==
Laman Blanchard, writing in 1836, described the Rother as "a beauteous stream", and noted that chub, roach and perch were caught by fishermen who fished from its banks. It was also one of the main sources of salmon for the River Don system. The river did not suffer from the worst effects of the industrial revolution until the 1880s, when the development of coal mining on several of its tributaries resulting in a rapid deterioration in water quality. The industry itself discharged minewater to the river, containing large volumes of solids, which were deposited on the river bed, smothering the vegetation. The villages which grew up around the mines often had little or no sewage treatment facilities, and hence sewage found its way into the river. The River Doe Lea, the River Drone and the Pools Brook became lifeless sewers, as did the Rother. Derbyshire County Council obtained a ruling from the Chesterfield County Court in 1905, which required local authorities to stop polluting the river, and gave them three years to construct sewage treatment works. However, the growth in population outstripped the efforts to resolve these issues, and the river continued to deteriorate. One or two of its tributaries were not polluted, and the River Hipper retained stocks of brown trout and grayling.

In 1974, the river was the most heavily polluted of the rivers in the River Don catchment. For most of its course, it was rated "Grade F" on the Environment Agency's scale of river quality. This scale ranges from "Grade A", which indicates that the water quality is very good and the river is unpolluted, to "Grade F", which indicates that the water quality is bad, and there is little or no life to be found in the water. The main sources of pollution were from coking plants, where coal was carbonised, from discharges from inefficient sewage treatment plants, and from the manufacture of chemicals.

=== Industrial pollution ===
The catchment area of the river is industrial and urban, and was the location for 48 sewage treatment works, the discharges from which fed into the river. Of these, eleven were deemed to be unsatisfactory in 1974, and a programme of rationalisation and improvement had reduced the number of works to 29 by 1996. Those closed included all of the unsatisfactory ones. Many of the remaining works were small, but the three major ones were located at Old Whittington, Staveley and Woodhouse Mill. Major upgrading of the Old Whittington sewage treatment works was carried out in the late 1980s and again in 1993, and included the addition of a nitrification plant to remove ammonia from the effluent. This resulted in a dramatic increase in water quality since 1993. Staveley works was built in 1993, and also includes a nitrification plant, while Woodhouse Mill works was commissioned in 1979, and replaced a number of poorly-performing smaller works to the south-east of Sheffield.

The river was also affected by discharges from the Staveley Chemicals and the Coalite sites. Staveley Chemicals were producing chlorine and sodium hydroxide by electrolysing brine, and the water discharged from the site contained significant quantities of mercury and ammonia. Mercury, in particular, is highly toxic to fish even in small concentrations, and in 1987, the works was discharging around 51 pounds (23 kg) per year into the river. The works, which was taken over by Rhône-Poulenc Chemicals, was fitted with a mercury recovery plant, and subsequently virtually no mercury was discharged. The Coalite site was manufacturing chemicals from the liquors produced as a by-product of the adjacent coking plant, and was discharging chlorinated compounds into the river. These were treated as part of a scheme to improve the discharges from the coking plant.

=== Regeneration ===
Water quality was also affected by four coking plants, at Orgreave, Brookhouse, Avenue and the Coalite plant at Shuttlewood, near Bolsover. Discharges from them significantly increased the ammonia content and the biochemical oxygen demand (BOD) of the river. Orgreave was discharging effluent with 146 mg/L of ammonia in 1985, which needed to be around 70% lower to improve the river quality to Grade D, but the plant closed in 1991, and water quality has improved dramatically since then. Discharges from Avenue coking plant were diverted into a foul sewer in 1986, to enable them to be treated at Old Whittington treatment works. The plant closed in 1992, but problems continued with phenolic oils leaching from the original storage lagoons into the river for several years after closure. Discharges from the Coalite plant reached the river through its tributary, the River Doe Lea. Again, there were significant improvements to the treatment of effluent in 1984, 1989 and 1996. Brookhouse was the smallest of the four works, but closed in the early 1980s before remedial works were implemented. The coking plants were the worst polluters of the river, and their closure resulted in water quality being significantly improved.

A biological survey was carried out in 1993, near Rother Valley Country Park, and only seven types of invertebrates were found, all of which were highly tolerant to pollution. It was recognised that the straight engineered channel where the river had been re-instated after coal mining was not well suited to the support of life, and so a stone weir was constructed, to help with natural aeration of the water, and to increase the flow velocity so that the gravel below the weir was scoured clean. A bay was constructed above the weir, where fish could escape when the river was affected by flooding or pollution incidents. A trial release of fish, funded by contributions from Rhone Poulenc, Coalite Chemicals and Yorkshire Water, was made in April 1994. Half of the total of 2,500 chub and 2,500 roach were released near the new weir, and the other half at Hall Road in Staveley. It soon became clear from anglers that the fish were spreading along the river, and a further 40,000 fish were released that winter. Another survey in September 1995 revealed good growth rates in the fish, and barbel were thriving. Brown trout, thought to have come from the River Hipper or the Barlow Brook, were also found in the Rother, and since these are much less tolerant to organic pollution and low oxygen levels, were a clear indicator that conditions were improving. The following year, chub and dace were released at Old Whittington, and clear evidence that the fish were breeding in the river was found. The river had become a self-sustaining fishery again, and organised angling began for the first time in over 100 years.

=== Assessment ===
The Environment Agency measure water quality of the river systems in England. Each is given an overall ecological status, which may be one of five levels: high, good, moderate, poor and bad. There are several components that are used to determine this, including biological status, which looks at the quantity and varieties of invertebrates, angiosperms and fish. Chemical status, which compares the concentrations of various chemicals against known safe concentrations, is rated good or fail.

The water quality of the Rother was as follows in 2019.

Section	Ecological Status	Chemical Status	Length	Catchment
Rother from Source to Redleadmill Brook	Poor	Fail	6.3 miles (10.1 km)	7.92 square miles (20.5 km^{2})
Rother from Redleadmill Brook to Spital Brook	Moderate	Fail	3.8 miles (6.1 km)	4.83 square miles (12.5 km^{2})
Rother from Spittal Brook to Doe Lea	Moderate	Fail	9.6 miles (15.4 km)	13.98 square miles (36.2 km^{2})
Rother from Doe Lea to Don	Moderate	Fail	21.1 miles (34.0 km)	28.31 square miles (73.3 km^{2})

The section from source to Redleadmill Brook has been rated poor since 2009. The lower Rother, from the Doe Lea to the Don was rated fail for chemical status in 2013, but then improved. Like most rivers in the UK, the chemical status changed from good to fail in 2019, due to the presence of polybrominated diphenyl ethers (PBDE), perfluorooctane sulphonate (PFOS) and mercury compounds, none of which had previously been included in the assessment.

== Points of interest ==
Point	Coordinates (Links to map resources)	OS Grid Ref	Notes
Junction with River Don	53.4254°N 1.3616°W	SK425922	
Canklow regulator	53.4023°N 1.3490°W	SK433896	
Orgreave weir	53.3816°N 1.3575°W	SK428873	
Woodhouse regulator	53.3658°N 1.3506°W	SK433856	
Beighton weir	53.3524°N 1.3321°W	SK445841	
Meadowgate regulator	53.3401°N 1.3190°W	SK454827	
River Doe Lea junction	53.2896°N 1.3373°W	SK442771	
Chesterfield Weir	53.2466°N 1.4204°W	SK387723	
Red Lead Mill Brook	53.1971°N 1.4045°W	SK398668	
Pilsley spring (source)	53.1578°N 1.3643°W	SK426624	

== Bibliography ==
- Firth, Christopher (1997). Domesday to the dawn of the New Millennium – 900 years of the Don fishery (PDF). Environment Agency. Archived from the original on 17 July 2019. (This is available online at The Don Catchment Rivers Trust. Page numbers refer to the PDF file).
- James, Alan (April 2017). "The Brittonic Language in the Old North - A Guide to the Place-Name Evidence" (PDF). Scottish Place Name Society. Archived from the original (PDF) on 4 July 2018.
- Richardson, Christine; Lower, John (2006). Chesterfield Canal. Richlow Guides. ISBN 978-0-9552609-0-2.
- Rotherham MBC (29 August 2024). "Overview of the October 2023 Storm Babet Flooding Event and Response (Appendix 1)" (PDF). Rotherham Metropolitan Borough Council. Archived (PDF) from the original on 3 December 2024.
- Squires, Roger (2008). Britain's Canals Restored (2nd Ed.). Landmark Publishing. ISBN 978-1-84306-331-5.
- Turpin, Emily (22 November 2023). "Don Regulators (2023)". Water Projects Online. Archived from the original on 22 July 2024.
