= Listed buildings in Unstone =

Unstone is a civil parish in the North East Derbyshire district of Derbyshire, England. The parish contains 15 listed buildings that are recorded in the National Heritage List for England. Of these, two are listed at Grade II*, the middle of the three grades, and the others are at Grade II, the lowest grade. The parish contains the villages of Unstone, Apperknowle and West Handley and smaller settlements, and is otherwise rural. Apart from a railway viaduct, all the listed buildings are houses, cottages and associated structures, farmhouses, and farm buildings.

== Key ==
Grade	Criteria
II*	Particularly important buildings of more than special interest
II	Buildings of national importance and special interest

== Buildings ==
Name and location	Photograph	Date	Notes	Grade
Ash Lane Farmhouse; 53.29546°N 1.40475°W		Late 16th century	The farmhouse is cruck framed, with walls of sandstone and a thatched roof. There is a single storey and attics, and three bays. In the centre is a lean-to porch, the windows are casements, and there are three eyebrow dormers. Inside, there are three cruck trusses.	II
The Old Barns; 53.29517°N 1.40449°W	—	Late 16th century	Two farm outbuildings linked and converted into a house in 1984. The building is in sandstone with quoins and has a Welsh slate roof with stone slate eaves. The south range has two storeys and three bays, and a central doorway between enlarged slit vents. The north range, at right angles, is earlier, and has a single storey and three bays. It contains two complete cruck trusses, and the remains of a third.	II
Summerley Farmhouse; 53.30477°N 1.44154°W		1605	The farmhouse is in sandstone with quoins, and a stone slate roof with coped gables and moulded kneelers. There are two storeys and two bays. The doorway has a massive quoined surround, an initialled and dated lintel and a hood mould. The windows are mullioned, with four lights in the ground floor, three lights in the upper floor, and hood moulds.	II
The Farm; 53.29960°N 1.43266°W	—	Early 17th century	A farmhouse in sandstone with quoins and a slate roof. There are two storeys and an L-shaped plan, with a front range of two bays and a rear extension. In the centre are two doorways, and the windows are mullioned with casements and hood moulds. At the southwest end is a blocked doorway with a quoined surround and a massive lintel. In the angle at the rear is a semicircular stair tower.	II
Summerley Hall, walls and gate piers 53.30462°N 1.44217°W	—	Early 17th century	The house is in sandstone with quoins, a parapet, and a tile roof with coped gables. There are two storeys, a double depth plan, a front range of two bays, and rear wings. The central doorway has a chamfered quoined surround, and a massive lintel, and the windows on the front are mullioned and transomed. At the rear is a semicircular stair tower. The front garden is enclosed by a wall that contains square gate piers with projecting moulded caps.	II
West Handley Hall; 53.29334°N 1.40378°W	—	Early 17th century	The house is in sandstone with quoins, and a stone slate roof with coped gables and moulded shell kneelers. There are two storeys and attics, and a T-shaped plan, with a front range of two bays flanked by single-storey wings, and a rear stair tower. The doorway has a massive surround and lintel, to the left is a four-light mullioned window, and above them is a continuous hood mould, with two-light mullioned windows in the upper floor. The west wing contains a casement window and a doorway with a plain surround.	II*
Unstone Manor House; 53.29209°N 1.44723°W		1663	The house is in sandstone on a chamfered plinth, with quoins, and a stone slate roof with coped gables and moulded kneelers. There is an L-shaped plan, with a west front of two storeys and six bays, and a two-bay projecting wing. The doorway has a quoined surround, and a massive lintel with a keystone, over which is a carved plaque and a hood mould. The windows either have a single light or are mullioned, there is a gabled dormer, and in the wing they are mullioned and transomed.	II*
Cowhouse southwest of Ash Lane Farmhouse; 53.29537°N 1.40494°W	—	Late 17th century	The farm building is in sandstone with a roof of corrugated sheet and a single storey. It contains two plain doorways and two windows, and in the south gable end is a taking-in door. Inside there is a single cruck truss.	II
Grange Farmhouse; 53.29501°N 1.43076°W	—	Mid 18th century	The farmhouse is in sandstone with quoins, and a tile roof with a coped gable and moulded kneelers to the east. There are two storeys and four bays. The doorway has a quoined surround and a massive lintel. Above the doorway is a mullioned and transomed window, there is a replacement casement window, and the other windows are mullioned with two lights.	II
Outbuildings, Grange Farm; 53.29496°N 1.43108°W		Late 18th century	The outbuildings are in sandstone with roofs of slate and stone slate, and are stepped, with the north range taller. The north range has a doorway with a massive quoined surround and a deep lintel, and two square taking-in openings. The south gable end contains a dovecote with a Gothic arch, perch platforms and entry holes. In the lower two-storey range are three upper floor taking-in doors.	II
Moortop Farmhouse; 53.30072°N 1.41728°W		Late 18th century	The farmhouse is in sandstone with a slate roof. There is an L-shaped plan, with part of an earlier farmhouse forming a rear range. The main range has three storeys and four bays. The doorway has a rectangular fanlight, the windows on the front are sashes, and at the rear are the remains of mullioned windows. The older range has two storeys and two bays, and contains mullioned windows and a porch.	II
Farm outbuilding north of Belle Vue Farmhouse; 53.28975°N 1.38894°W	—	c. 1800	The building is in sandstone, and has a Welsh slate roof with coped gables and moulded kneelers. There is a single storey and eight bays. On the west side are a doorway and two plain rectangular openings, and the east side is mainly open fronted with monolithic columns.	II
Outbuilding east of Ash Lane Farmhouse; 53.29547°N 1.40450°W		Early 19th century	The outbuilding is in sandstone with quoins and a roof of slate and stone slate. There are two storeys and five bays, the north three bays higher. On the front are three doorways with massive surrounds and heavy lintels, a doorway converted into a window, three taking-in doors, and slit vents.	II
Outbuilding northwest of Ash Lane Farmhouse; 53.29547°N 1.40496°W	—	Early 19th century	The outbuilding is in sandstone with a roof of corrugated sheet. There is a T-shaped plan, the cross-wing at the north having an overloft, and a gable with weatherboarding and a full-width opening below. The main wing has two stable doors, and two feeding troughs with projecting semicircular stone feed shelves under brick arched heads.	II
Springwell House; 53.28584°N 1.39776°W	—	Early 19th century	A brick house with sandstone dressings and a hipped slate roof. There are two storeys and three bays. The central doorway has a rectangular fanlight, and the windows are sashes with stone wedge lintels.	II
Railway Viaduct; 53.28707°N 1.43859°W		1870	The viaduct was built by the Midland Railway to carry its line over the River Drone. It is in gritstone with brick linings, and consists of seven semicircular stilted arches, rising from tapering rectangular piers. The voussoirs end in a band course, and above is a shallow parapet with railings.	II
