= Bagger Wood =

Woodland in South Yorkshire, England

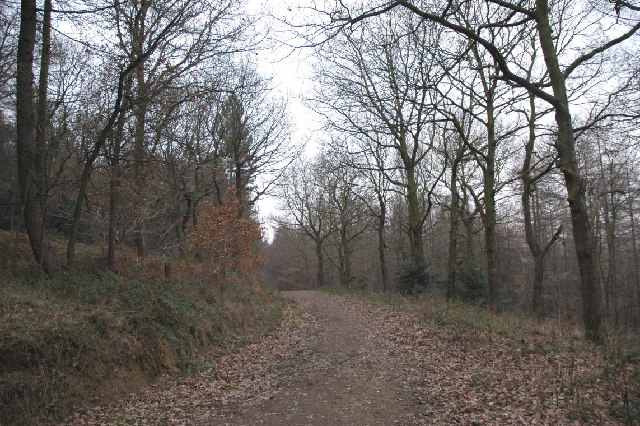
- Track through Bagger Wood

- Location within South Yorkshire
- Interactive map of Bagger Wood

Geography
- Location: South Yorkshire, England
- OS grid: SE303026
- Coordinates: 53.519°N 1.543°W
- Area: 67.56 acres (27.34 ha)

Administration
- Authority: Woodland Trust

Bagger Wood is a 67.56 acres (27.34 ha) woodland in the English county of South Yorkshire, near to the village of Hood Green, about 4 miles (6 km) south-west of Barnsley. The wood forms part of the South Yorkshire Forest and is within an Area of Great Landscape Value. It is owned and managed by the Woodland Trust.

== History ==
Bagger Wood is an ancient woodland site, dating back to at least 1600. Traditionally a wood of broadleaved trees, a large number of conifers were planted at the site in the 1960s. In 2008, the Woodland Trust began a two-year programme of restoration work to encourage the native broadleaves, using a £10,000 grant from the Waste Recycling Group.

== Access and management ==
The wood is currently owned by the Woodland Trust, which manages the wood in partnership with a local community group. As with all other Woodland Trust woodlands, Bagger Wood is open to the public, and the Trust estimates that it receives around 3000 visitors per year. There is a circular path through the wood for walkers, and also a forest track through the centre suitable for horse riders. The wood has its own car park.

== Flora and fauna ==
The wood is a mixture of conifers and broadleaves, such as oak, beech and sycamore. The latter mostly date from the 1930s, while the conifers have been planted more recently.
