= Rother Link =

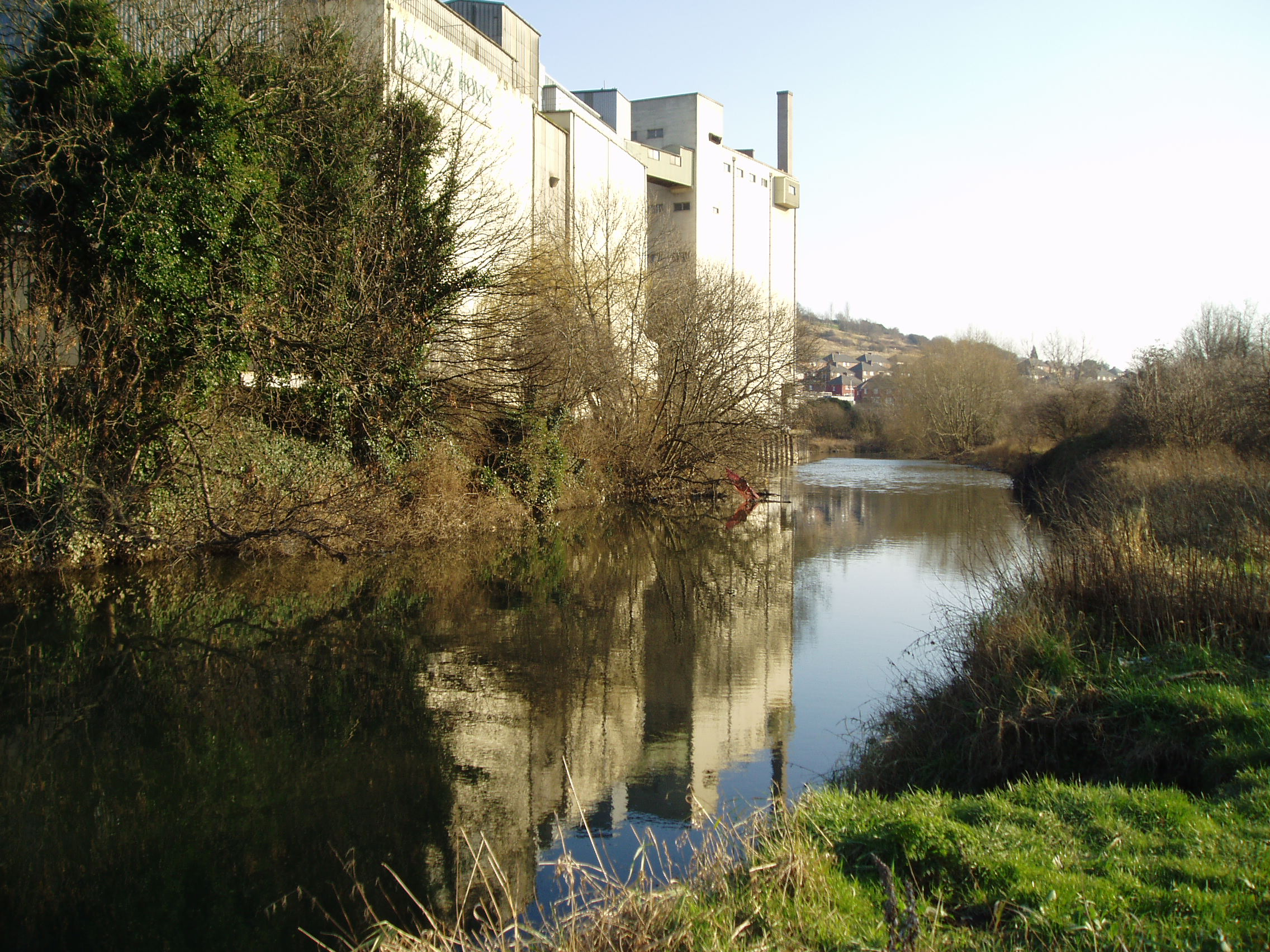
- The River Rother just before it joins the River Don at Rotherham

Specifications
- Locks: unknown
- Status: Proposed river navigation

Geography
- Start point: Rother Valley Country Park
- End point: Rotherham
- Connects to: Chesterfield Canal, River Don Navigation

The Rother Link is a planned English canal that would connect the Chesterfield Canal at Killamarsh, via the River Rother through to the Sheffield and South Yorkshire Navigation, thus creating a new cruising ring and encouraging boats to visit the Chesterfield Canal.

== Proposals ==
The Rother Link was first suggested in early 1995, when the Chesterfield Canal Society submitted their proposal to the National Rivers Authority for the conversion to navigable status of the 6-mile (9.7 km) section of the River Rother from Killamarsh to Rotherham. The link has been adopted as an official goal by the Chesterfield Canal Partnership, a group of councils at district and county level, working together with British Waterways and the Chesterfield Canal Trust. The councils consist of Derbyshire County Council, Chesterfield Borough Council, North East Derbyshire District Council, Rotherham Metropolitan Borough Council, Bassettlaw District Council and Nottinghamshire County Council.

While the connection between the Chesterfield Canal and the River Rother would have been difficult to achieve when the canal followed its original route, the need to create a diversion around housing development in Killamarsh, which has destroyed the former course, makes it much simpler. The current plans for the Chesterfield Canal reinstatement envisage the canal turning to the north and dropping down through five locks to reach Nethermoor Lake, one of four lakes that are part of the Rother Valley Country Park. From the far end of the lake, another six locks would return the level to the existing channel near Norwood. There is a relatively easy route from the lake to the Rother, which would probably require a flood lock for protection.

The route diagram shows existing roads and railways which cross the River Rother between the Rother Valley Country Park and Rotherham. As there is a drop of around 46 feet (14 m) between these two points, several locks would be required, and the waterway would consist of a number of river sections with cuts to accommodate the locks. In 2016 it was suggested that around six locks would be required, and that they would be broad locks, at 14 feet (4.3 m) by 72 feet (22 m). Much of the route is already canalised, with the banks protected by concrete and steel piling. If the project goes ahead, old washlands and waterlogged wooded carrs would be reinstated, features that were lost when the present flood control measures were installed.

The route of the river is quite easy to follow, as the Trans Pennine Trail runs along the river bank from Rotherham to the A631 bridge, and then follows the valley to Rother Valley Country Park, on its way to Chesterfield. The Trans Pennine Trail is a long-distance footpath, connecting Liverpool, Leeds, Hull and Chesterfield, and is suitable for walking and cycling, with some sections suitable for horse riding.

=== Benefits ===
As with similar canal schemes, the Rother Valley Link would bring economic benefits to the region, which are estimated to be around £2.4 million in visitor spending per year. The link would also mean that the Chesterfield Canal was more easily accessible to boaters for which the transit of the tidal River Trent is daunting. A further benefit for walkers, cyclists and boaters would be the creation of a South Yorkshire Ring, which would be around 108 miles (174 km) long. This would follow the new link from the Rother Valley Country Park to Rotherham, pass down the River Don Navigation to Bramwith, along the Stainforth and Keadby Canal to Keadby, up the River Trent to West Stockwith, and back along the Chesterfield Canal to the country park.

== Precursors ==
The idea of a link between the Chesterfield Canal and the River Don system is not new. Benjamin Outram, reporting to those planning the Sheffield Canal in 1793 proposed an extension to his Eckington, Beighton, Attercliffe and Tinsley route, which would use five narrow locks to join up with the Chesterfield Canal, at a cost of £4,175. Neither the main route, nor the extension were pursued. In 1810, a proposal to link Rotherham to the Chesterfield Canal was made by Richard Gresley. This was the North Eastern Junction Canal, and envisaged a link from the Chesterfield Canal to the Cromford Canal as well, but the scheme met with little enthusiasm.

In 1814, the Sheffield Canal promoters were considering two schemes, one to the north of the River Don, and one to the south, and the southern route was preferred because it would make a future link to the Chesterfield Canal easier to construct. The idea was revived in June 1832, with a proposal for a Sheffield and Chesterfield Junction Canal, which would run from the top of the locks at Sheffield to Killamarsh forge on the Chesterfield Canal. The 7.7-mile (12.4 km) canal, requiring two locks, was costed at £46,204 by the engineer Joseph Burke. A further report was made in October 1832 by George Leather, who included some improvements and revised the cost to £75,870. With no interest being shown by the River Don Navigation, the project foundered due to the failure to raise the necessary finance.

== Gallery ==
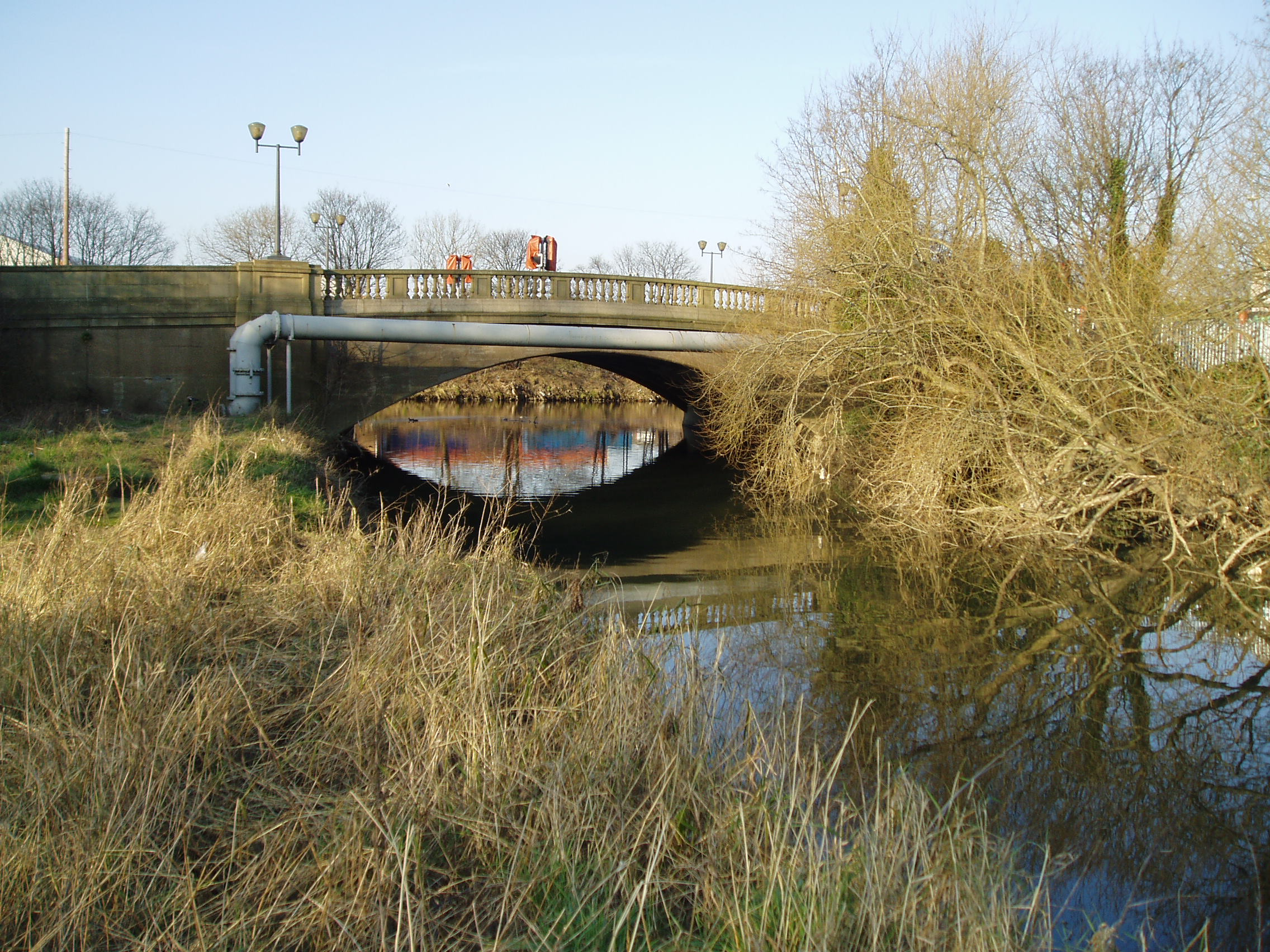
A6021 bridge where the River Rother joins the River Don at Rotherham

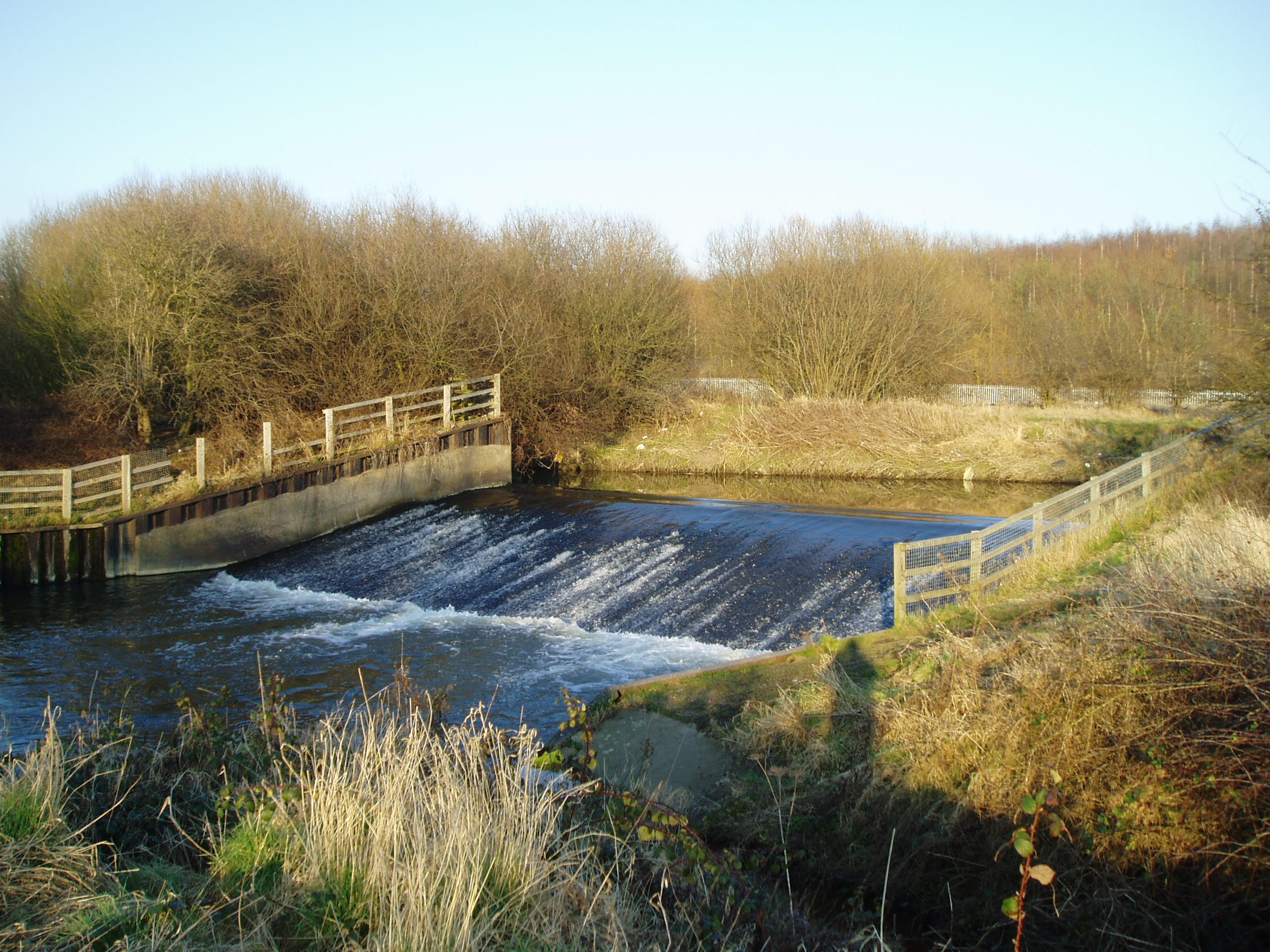
The weir at Beighton on the River Rother

== Route ==
Point	Coordinates (Links to map resources)	OS Grid Ref	Notes
Rotherham	53.426°N 1.362°W	SK425922	Junction with River Don
Ickles	53.421°N 1.361°W	SK425917	A630 bridge
M1 motorway	53.399°N 1.344°W	SK436893	bridge
Catcliffe	53.391°N 1.361°W	SK426885	Railway bridge
Beighton	53.352°N 1.331°W	SK445841	weir
Rother Valley	53.338°N 1.318°W	SK454825	Country Park
Chesterfield Canal	53.331°N 1.308°W	SK461818	End of watered section

== See also ==
- Canals of Great Britain
- History of the British canal system

== Bibliography ==
- Denny, Andrew (June 2016). "Creating the South Yorkshire Ring". Waterways World. ISSN 0309-1422.
- Hadfield, Charles (1973). The Canals of Yorkshire and North East England (Vol 2). David and Charles. ISBN 978-0-7153-5975-4.
- Squires, Roger (2008). Britain's Canals Restored (2nd Ed.). Landmark Publishing. ISBN 978-1-84306-331-5.
