= Listed buildings in Ulley =

Ulley, is a civil parish in the Metropolitan Borough of Rotherham, South Yorkshire, England. The parish contains five listed buildings that are recorded in the National Heritage List for England. All the listed buildings are designated at Grade II, the lowest of the three grades, which is applied to "buildings of national importance and special interest". The parish contains the village of Ulley and the surrounding area, and all the listed buildings are houses and associated structures within the village.

== Buildings ==
Name and location	Photograph	Date	Notes
Ulley Hall; 53.38158°N 1.30134°W	—	1718	A large house in sandstone on a plinth, with chamfered quoins, a floor band, an eaves cornice, and a hipped Welsh slate roof. There are two storeys, attics and cellars, a double-depth plan, and five bays. The central doorway has an eared architrave, plinth blocks, a keystone, and a cornice. The windows are sashes, the window over the doorway with a rusticated, dated and initialled apron, and a rusticated panel above. At the rear is a stair window over which is an oculus with a keystone, and in the roof are three gabled dormers, the middle dormer with a segmental head.
Ulley Grange; 53.38298°N 1.30066°W	—	1722	A house that was later extended, it is in sandstone on a plinth, with chamfered quoins, a floor band, an eaves cornice, and hipped roofs in stone slate roof with some Welsh slate at the rear. There are two storeys and an attic, a main block with fronts of five and three bays, and a later two-storey link to an 18th-century outbuilding. The main doorway has a dentilled moulded architrave, a fanlight, an inscribed and dated frieze, and an overhanging cornice on consoles. The windows are sashes in architraves, and in the roof are three dormers with triangular and segmental heads. At the rear is a stair window with two transoms. In the outbuilding are mullioned windows, a doorway with a quoined surround, and external steps.
Dovecote and outbuilding, Ulley Hall; 53.38141°N 1.30136°W	—	Early 18th century	The dovecote and outbuilding are in sandstone, with quoins, and stone slate eaves courses to pantile roofs with coped gables and shaped kneelers. The dovecote has two storeys and one bay, and the outbuilding has a single storey. A garage door has been inserted in the dovecote and external steps lead up to a doorway. In the left return of the dovecote are two casement windows and a blocked mullioned window.
Wall and gateway, Ulley Hall; 53.38164°N 1.30083°W	—	Early 18th century	The wall enclosing the garden of the house is in sandstone, partly lined in brick, and is coped. The gateway by the roadside has three steps and square stone piers with moulded plinths, fielded panels and cornices, and they contain ornate wrought iron gates. There is another gateway on the left side opposite the house.
23 Main Street; 53.38283°N 1.30249°W	—	Mid 18th century	A farmhouse in sandstone with quoins and a Welsh slate roof. There are two storeys and an L-shaped plan, with a front range of two bays, a rear wing of four bays on the right, and additions in the angle. The doorway in the rear wing has a moulded surround, and the windows are mullioned with a continuous lintel band. The doorway in the front range has a fanlight, and the windows are sashes. In the gable end is a single-light window with a hood mould.
