= Listed buildings in Treeton =

Treeton is a civil parish in the Metropolitan Borough of Rotherham, South Yorkshire, England. The parish contains seven listed buildings that are recorded in the National Heritage List for England. Of these, one is listed at Grade I, the highest of the three grades, and the others are at Grade II, the lowest grade. The parish contains the village of Treeton and the surrounding countryside. The listed buildings consist of houses and cottages, farmhouses and farm buildings, a church, its former rectory, and a set of stocks.

== Key ==
Grade	Criteria
I	Particularly important buildings of more than special interest
II	Buildings of national importance and special interest

== Buildings ==
Name and location	Photograph	Date	Notes	Grade
St Helen's Church; 53.38451°N 1.35122°W		Late 12th century	The church has been altered and extended through the centuries, and was restored in the 19th century. It is built in sandstone, with dressings and the upper part of the tower in limestone, and the roof is in lead. The church consists of a nave with a clerestory, north and south aisles, a south porch, a northwest vestry, a chancel with a south chapel, and a southwest tower. The tower has three stages, a west lancet window, string courses, a clock on the east side, two-light bell openings, and an embattled parapet with crocketed pinnacles.	I
25 Bole Hill; 53.39041°N 1.34677°W	—	1655	A house that was later extended to the right, it is in red sandstone with quoins, the main part with a stone slate roof, and the extension with a Welsh slate roof. There are two storeys, the main range has two bays, a single-storey wing and an outshut at the rear, and the extension has a single bay. The main range has a chamfered plinth, quoins, a central doorway with a quoined surround and a projecting keystone with the date and initials. In the ground floor are two casement windows with pediments, and two small lights. The upper floor contains a miniature oriel window flanked by dormers with moulded surrounds and pediments under Dutch gables. The windows in the extension are casements.	II
Farm building, north of Spa House Farmhouse; 53.39065°N 1.33848°W	—	Mid 18th century	Cowhouses and haylofts that were extended in the 19th century, they are in sandstone, with quoins, and a pantile roof with square-cut gable copings and shaped kneelers. There are two storeys, a main range, a gabled wing on the right, and a later gabled wing beyond that. The main range has external steps, doorways in both storeys and a casement window. In the older wing are mullioned casement windows and a hatch, and the later wing contains a window and a loading door.	II
Village stocks 53.384285°N 1.35134°W	—	18th century (probable)	The stocks, near the church, consist of two round-headed sandstone posts with slots for wooden boards.	II
24 Station Road; 53.38531°N 1.35305°W	—	Mid to late 18th century	A farmhouse and two cottages, later used for other purposes, they are in sandstone with quoins, the house with a Welsh slate roof, and the cottages with a pantile roof. The house has a plinth, chamfered quoins, square-cut gable copings, and shaped kneelers. There are three storeys and three bays, and a central porch, and most of the windows are sashes. The cottages are recessed on the left, they have two storeys and two bays, and have retained some mullioned windows.	II
Farm building, southwest of Spa House Farmhouse; 53.39011°N 1.33868°W	—	Late 18th to early 19th century	A combination farm building in sandstone, with quoins, and a pantile roof with square-cut gable copings and shaped kneelers. There are two storeys and five bays. The openings on the front include doorways, casement windows and slit vents, all with lintels tooled as voussoirs. In the left return are two round-arched carriage openings with a central cylindrical pier, imposts, and tooled voussoirs, and above are slit vents.	II
The Georgian House; 53.38483°N 1.35147°W	—	Early 19th century	A rectory, later a private house, it is in sandstone with a hipped Welsh slate roof. There are two storeys, four bays on the front, and a lean-to on the right. The doorway has pilasters, a fanlight, and an open pediment. The windows are sashes with lintels tooled as voussoirs. At the rear are three bays, a French window, a band, and an eaves cornice.	II
