= Unstone =

Village in Derbyshire, England

Coordinates: 53.28°N 1.44°W

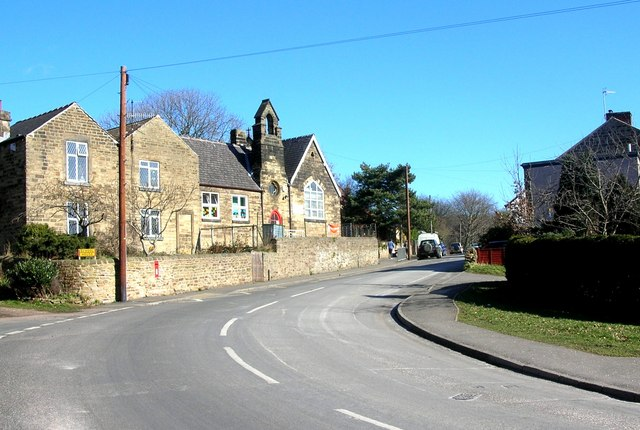
- Unstone St Mary's Infant School

- Location within Derbyshire
- Population: 1,876 (2011)
- OS grid reference: SK3777
- Civil parish: Unstone
- District: North East Derbyshire
- Shire county: Derbyshire
- Region: East Midlands
- Country: England
- Sovereign state: United Kingdom
- Post town: DRONFIELD
- Postcode district: S18
- Dialling code: 01246
- Police: Derbyshire
- Fire: Derbyshire
- Ambulance: East Midlands
- UK Parliament: North East Derbyshire

Unstone (/ˈʌnstən/ UN-stən) is a village and civil parish in the English county of Derbyshire, in the North East Derbyshire administrative district approximately 1 mile (1.6 km) south east of Dronfield.

== Geography ==
It is also close to the town of Chesterfield. The River Drone and the Midland Main Line railway run through the village, which has a population of over 1,000, increasing to 1,876 and including Apperknowle at the time of the 2011 Census.

== History ==
Unstone developed as a small rural settlement but became more industrialised in the 19th century with the expansion of coal mining in the area. The most significant site was Unstone Main Colliery, which was in operation during the late 19th century.

The colliery was served by a branch connected to the Midland Railway. According to Derbyshire Historic Environment Record entries, the site was expanded with the construction of a railway around 1870, and early Ordnance Survey maps show colliery buildings, shafts, and a rail siding. By approximately 1900, the colliery is recorded as disused on mapping of the period.

Associated with the colliery was a tramway linking it to nearby workings, constructed after 1876 and out of use by 1898. Although the colliery itself closed around the turn of the 20th century, earthworks, embankments, and the remains of shafts and transport routes have been recorded on later maps and during site visits, indicating that physical traces of the industrial activity survived into the late 20th century.

Today, the area has largely returned to a rural character, although woodland and landscape features still preserve evidence of its mining past.

Unstone community centre is built on the former trackbed of the Midland branch next to the former overbridge on Crow Lane.

The village has more than doubled in size over the past century. A modern housing estate, Unstone Green, was built at the other side of the railway line from the original village. The majority of the estate, which was built in the 1940s, was initially intended to be temporary housing for the many coal miners in the area, but it is still intact today. Originally on the A61 trunk road, the village is now bypassed by the Unstone-Dronfield Bypass dual carriageway.

== Facilities ==
The village has two schools: Unstone St Mary's Infant School on Crow Lane and Unstone Junior School on Main Road.

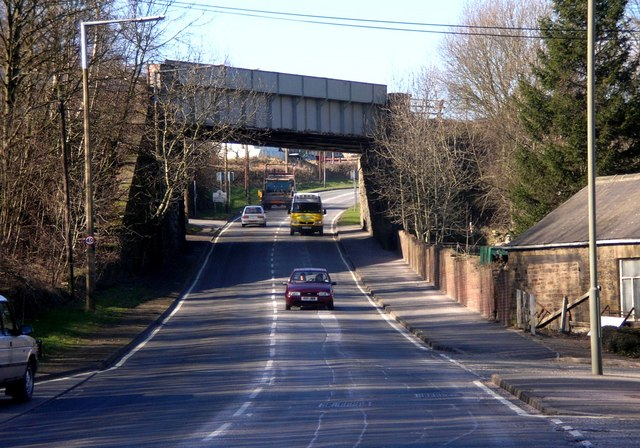
The road from Dronfield

The village has a parish council. Unstone Grange, run by a registered charity is a retreat that describes itself as "a centre for personal creative growth."

There are bus services to Chesterfield, Sheffield and Holmesfield.

The village used to be served by the now-closed Unstone railway station.

Landmarks are a TV transmitter and a railway viaduct. There is one public house, the Horse and Jockey. The village post office closed in 2019.

== Television transmitter ==
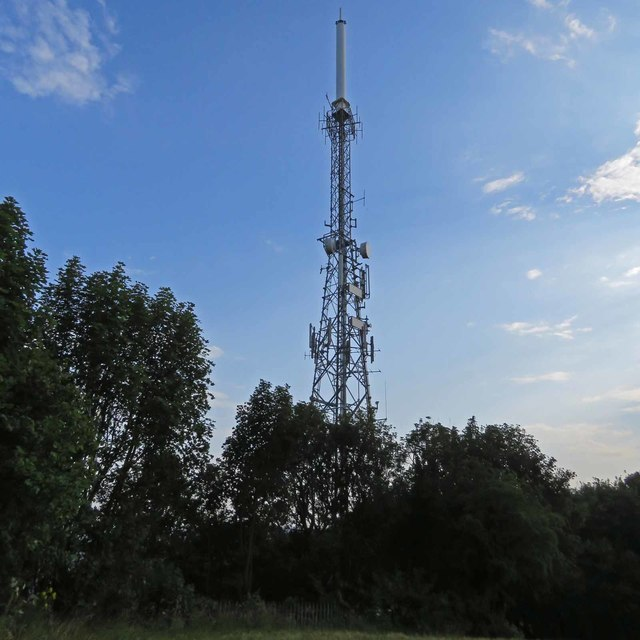
Television mast in July 2019

The mast opened as an ITA colour site on 1 September 1971. The BBC added a BBC Radio Sheffield transmitter in June 1991.

== See also ==
- Listed buildings in Unstone
- List of places in Derbyshire
