= Ulley =

Village and civil parish in South Yorkshire, England

Coordinates: 53.37°N 1.30°W

- Village and Civil Parish
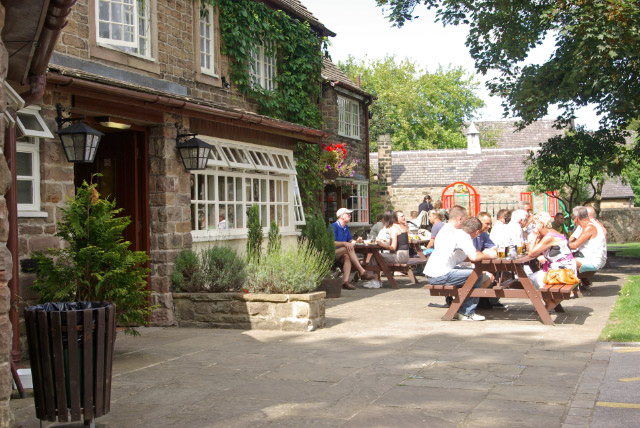
- The Royal Oak

- Location within South Yorkshire
- Population: 182 (2001 census)
- Civil parish: Ulley
- Metropolitan borough: Rotherham
- Metropolitan county: South Yorkshire
- Region: Yorkshire and the Humber
- Country: England
- Sovereign state: United Kingdom
- Post town: SHEFFIELD
- Postcode district: S26
- Dialling code: 0114
- Police: South Yorkshire
- Fire: South Yorkshire
- Ambulance: Yorkshire
- UK Parliament: Rother Valley
- Website: http://www.ulleyweb.co.uk/

Ulley is a village and civil parish of the Metropolitan Borough of Rotherham in South Yorkshire, England. The population of the civil parish as of the 2011 census was 172. It is located about 4 miles (6 km) south of the town of Rotherham and 7 miles (11 km) east of Sheffield City Centre.

== History ==
Excavations in Ulley have revealed the course of a probable Roman road running north–south through the village. Other Roman finds in the village include coins and a fragment of Samarian ware.

The earliest written record of Ulley is in the Domesday Book of 1086, where it is referred to as Ollei. The name is Old English in origin but of uncertain meaning. It may derive from wulf (wolf) or Ulla (a Saxon personal name) and lēah, meaning a meadow. Alternatively, it may mean 'woodland clearing frequented by owls'. Following the Norman Conquest of England in 1066, Ulley was among the lands given to the Earl of Mortain. Later, the village passed into the hands of the Priory of Worksop.

In the Second World War a starfish site, designed to act as a decoy and attract German bombers bound for Sheffield, Templeborough steel works and marshalling yards at Rotherham, was built near to Ulley.

During the Second World War, a German bombing raid for Sheffield dropped bombs on a set of cottages situated on Main Street where houses 5–7 are now. The bombs hit the cottages but failed to detonate. When the army arrived to deal with the unexploded bombs, they retired to the pub to decide what to do, and while they were there the bombs exploded, demolishing the cottages.

== Governance ==
Ulley is a civil parish and local issues are governed by a Parish Council, one of 29 such councils in the Metropolitan Borough of Rotherham. It is in the Rother Vale Ward of the Borough, which is represented on the Borough Council by Georgina Boyes, Gerald Nightingale, and John Swift, all members of the Labour Party. This ward is part of the Rother Valley parliamentary constituency, and was represented in the House of Commons by MP Kevin Barron of the Labour Party who held the seat from 1983 until he retired in 2019.The seat for the first time in history was secured by the Conservatives in the general election in 2019 to an MP who lives in London.

== Demography ==
At the time of the United Kingdom 2001 census the population of Ulley civil parish was 183 people.

Below is a table outlining population change of the parish since 1881.

Year	1881	1901	1951	2001
Population	136	225	200	183
Source: A Vision of Britain through Time

== Landmarks ==
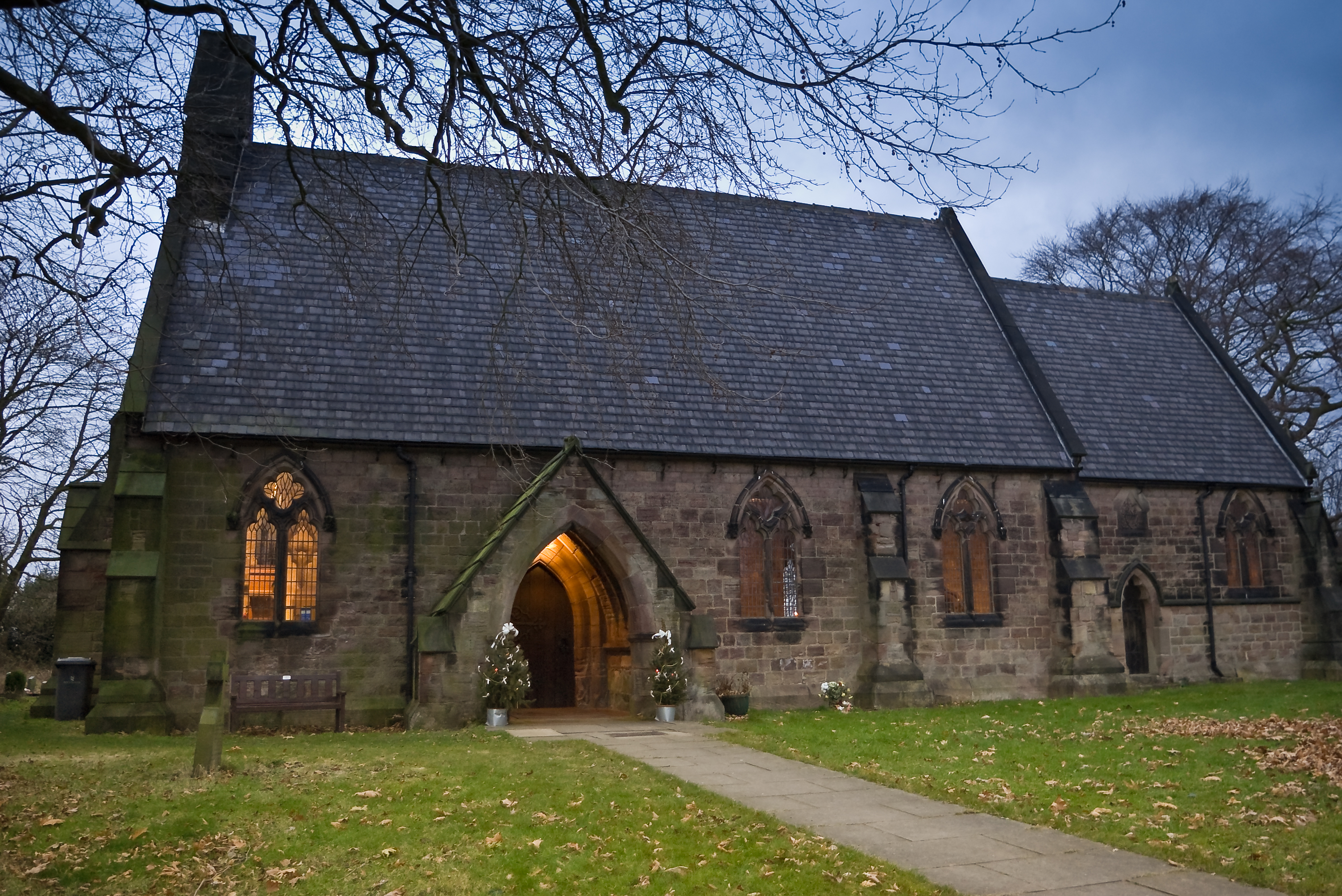
Holy Trinity Church, Ulley

Holy Trinity Church is a Church of England parish church in the village that was built in 1851. It is now run as a benefice with All Saints Church, Aston cum Aughton and Christ Church, Swallownest.

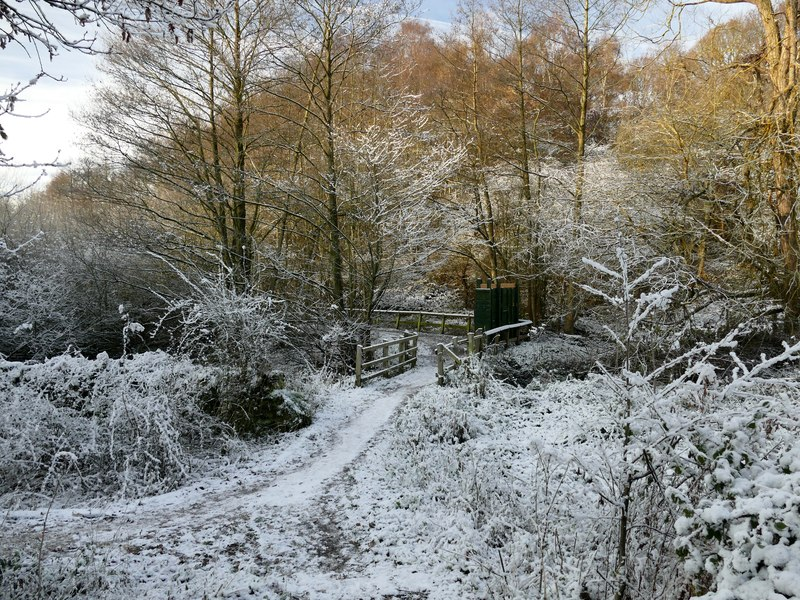
Ulley Country Park in winter

Ulley Country Park is a 47-acre (19 ha) park a few hundred yards to the west, downhill of the village. The park incorporates Ulley reservoir, which was built in 1871 and used to provide approximately 180 million gallons of water per year to Rotherham. By the 1980s, the reservoir was not needed for water supply and was on standby only. It was sold to Rotherham Metropolitan Borough Council for the token sum of £1 and the reservoir and surrounding land were designated a country park. On 25 June 2007, during the 2007 United Kingdom floods, cracks in the reservoir walls were found after heavy rains in the area, causing concerns that the reservoir might burst.

== Transport ==
Ulley is located just off the A618 and close to the M1 motorway. Bus services provided by Powells Bus Co. link the village with Rotherham Town Centre and Maltby. The closest mainline railway stations are at Sheffield, Rotherham Central and Meadowhall.

== See also ==
- Listed buildings in Ulley
