= River Drone =

River in Derbyshire, England

Coordinates: 53°16′30″N 1°26′31″W

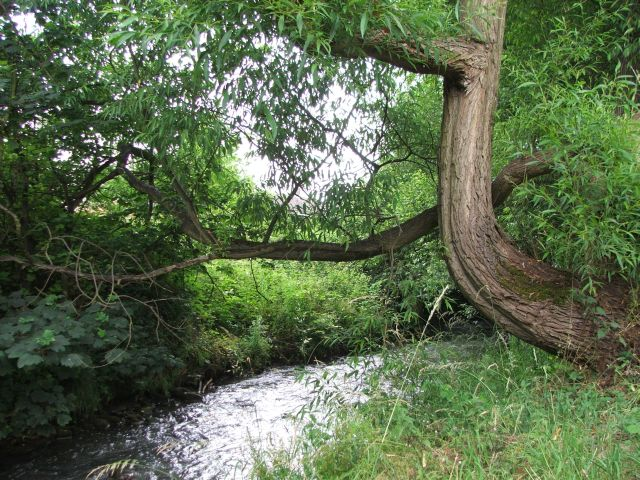
- River Drone by Ramshaw Woods, Unstone

Location
- Country: England

Physical characteristics
- Source
  - location: Sheffield Border
  - elevation: 140 m (460 ft) (Dronfield)
- Mouth
  - location: River Rother
- Length: 9.6 km (6.0 mi)
- Basin size: 57.8 km^{2} (22.3 sq mi)
- Discharge
  - location: Sheepbridge
  - average: 0.8 m^{3}/s (28 cu ft/s)

The River Drone is a river which flows south from its source on the Sheffield, South Yorkshire, border. It flows through Dronfield, Unstone and Unstone Green in Derbyshire before merging at Sheepbridge to the north of Chesterfield with the Barlow Brook. Below the junction, it is often referred to as the River Whitting. It then flows south-east till it merges with the River Rother at Brimington Road North (B6050) at Chesterfield. It is one of the three main tributaries of the Rother.

== Course ==
The River Drone rises as several small streams south of Sheffield. One rises close to the 705-foot (215 m) contour near the Hamlet of Mickley and flows east, crossing the Midland Main Line railway by an aqueduct a little south of Bradway Tunnel and then passing under the A61 road Unstone-Dronfield Bypass and the B6057 Sheffield Road, which was downgraded when the bypass was constructed. A second source rises north-east of Bradway Tunnel, on Dore and Totley golf course. It flows east and passes under the A61 and the B6057 Jordanthorpe Parkway, where it is joined by a third source, rising south of Jordanthorpe and flowing south-west. After the junction, the combined flow heads south-west, to join the first stream at Holmley Common. The river shares the valley with the B6057 and the railway for much of its length, and there are numerous crossings as the river weaves along the valley floor.

After a crossing by the B6057, the channel follows a straight course beside the railway, then passes under an industrial estate and the railway in a culvert. Before it was culverted, it looped to the east around Dronfield Forge, which made spades and shovels. It soon passes back under the railway end enters another culvert, from which it emerges at Lea Road Bridge. This is at the northern end of Dronfield railway station and was designed by J. S. Crossley, the Engineer-in-Chief for the Midland Railway, when they built their new line from Chesterfield to Sheffield via Dronfield in 1870. The bridge is grade II listed, as it was one of the most complex structures on the route between Derby and Sheffield. It consists of two segmental arches, which cross the railway in its cutting, followed by a right-angled bend and three more arches, one of which crosses the river. The river passes under the station, to be joined by a small tributary flowing eastwards from Gosforth Valley, and immediately crosses back under the station again.

After another crossing by the B6057 and the railway, the river loops south-west. Dronfield Works, which made shovels, and the gas works were on the right bank, while the river widened to form the mill pond for Dronfield Corn Mill. The tail race rejoined the river after both had passed under the railway. As it approaches Dronfield Sewage Works, the river passes through Dronfield Nature Park, and is joined by another tributary, which rises near Bentley Farm, heads west to Bentley Hall Farm, and then runs along the eastern edge of Dronfield through Frith Wood and through an industrial park to join the Drone. The river continues in a south-easterly direction, passing under Half Acre Land and Crow Lane, Unstone, and then turns south-west to reach the site of Unstone Mill. Continuing on, it passes through one of the seven arches of Unstone Viaduct, built in 1870 as part of the Chesterfield to Sheffield line of the Midland Railway. It was designed by J. S. Crossley and is grade II listed.

The river passes east of Unstone Green, where it is crossed by Whittington Lane and then the B6057 road at Brierley Bridge. Further south, is passes back under that road, and then through a long culvert under the A61 road and its slip roads. It is joined by Barlow Brook on its right bank, and becomes the River Whitting. Almost immediately it is crossed again by the A61, and then the B6057 and the railway. It runs along the south-west border of Old Whittington, where it is crossed by the B6052 road, and the final bridge carries another railway, the line to Sheffield via Barrow Hill. Just beyond the bridge it joins the River Rother on its left bank.

== History ==
In the late 1990s the river burst its banks and flooded Dronfield 'bottom' shopping area, and as a result a flood storage reservoir was built at Bowshaw to hold back (attenuate) the storm water runoff from the Batemoor and Jordanthorpe housing estates in the south of Sheffield, which form part of the catchment area. Some work was also done to build up the bank level with bunds or retaining walls in some sections of the valley.

The river used to feed several water wheels at early factories in the Dronfield valley in the 18th and 19th centuries. Part of the mill race is visible off Mill Lane in Dronfield, the remains of the mill being demolished in the 1970s.

The flow of the river has been measured using a weir just below the confluence with the Barlow Brook at Sheepbridge since 1976. This long-term record shows that the drainage basin of 50 square kilometres (19 sq mi) to the gauging station yielded an average flow of 0.8 cubic metres per second (28 cu ft/s).

== Water power ==
The river provided power to some mills along its course. There was a water-powered corn mill at Dronfield, known as the Nether Mill or Lower Mill. It was recorded on a map compiled in 1710. A steam-powered flour mill was constructed a few years before 1813, and is thought to have supplemented the main corn mill. In 1845, the site included a kiln, a brewhouse, an engine house and machinery, a brazier's shop and a manufactory, in addition to the corn mill and its mill goit or tail race.

The locations of other sites that used water power in Dronfield are marked by at least four dams, built in the 18th century to supply mills and workshops, as the river banks became industrialised to support the iron and coal industries. The uppermost of these was the iron foundry opened by Edward Lucas and Son in 1790. However, the industries were in decline by the time the railway arrived in 1870, and many houses became vacant when the steelworks relocated to Workington in 1881, taking large numbers of workers with them.

There was a mill at Unstone, north of Unstone railway station. The 1882 map clearly shows the mill pond, with buildings at its south-eastern end, but does not give any indication as to its use. By 1898 it was labelled Unstone Mills and was producing edge tools. It reverted to having no description in 1919, and by 1958 part of it was a "works" and other parts were in ruins.

Further downstream, a mill at Unstone was recorded in 1538, when the miller was R. Seveyson. A later miller, Joseph Haslehurst, became bankrupt in 1826. The mill was called Unstone Mill on the 1840 Ordnance Survey map, but another map by Burdett called it Highwood Mill. In 1880 the mill was rebuilt, but did not last long as it was destroyed by a fire in November 1887. The site can be identified by the river channels, but there are few structural remains of the buildings, although small sections of wall were still visible in 1980. Ordnance Survey maps showed it as a corn mill in 1882 and 1898, but it was no longer in use by 1919.

Another site was Coal Aston corn mill, close to the Chesterfield Road on the River Drone. The industrialist Christopher Rotherham moved there in 1820, and the site included his house, a grinding mill, a dam and a workshop. It was on the Hallowes Farm estate, and he developed it significantly, for by 1851 it was a sickle works employing 20 men, several of whom were related to him. There was industrial unrest at the works in 1856, when Mark Barker was caught after stealing 12 hammers and 20 pairs of tongs. At the trial, Rotherham maintained that Barker had stolen them because of his own anti-Union sentiment, and the stealing of tools was a common tactic at the time. This was never proved, but Barker served 18 months in prison with hard labour as a result. Subsequently, bellows were damaged, straps cut, and anvils thrown into the mill pool. Before 1860, his workers had refused to pay subscriptions to the Sickle Grinder's Union, and threats were made against him that the works would be blown up. There were several incidents involving explosives between then and 1863, when in June an attempt to blow up his warehouse, which was attached to the house where five members of his family lived, failed to detonate. He had had enough, and reluctantly persuaded his workers to join the Sickle Grinder's Union, after which the incidents ceased. After his death on 4 December 1870, the manufacturing of sickles was handled by two of his grandsons, who opened new premises at Unstone Mill in 1873, but the business failed less than a year later. It was sold to John Henry Harrison, Rotherham's son-in-law, and continued to produce sickles until it failed in 1953.

On the River Whitting section, Whittington Mill was inferred in a deed dating from 1599, and near the weir a broken millstone carrying the date 1679 was found. The mill and kiln buildings were dismantled in 1735 and had been rebuilt by 1736. The work, for which detailed records are held in Chesterfield Borough Library, was commissioned by the Duke of Devonshire and cost £195-12s-8d. Two waterwheels were fitted, but the accounts do not mention any new millstones, although there were five sets. It was marked as a flour mill in 1876 and a corn mill in 1898. In 1886 the Elliot family, who were running the mill, took legal action against the Chesterfield Rural Sanitary Authority, alleging that they were in breach of their authorising Act of Parliament. They were extracting water from the Barlow Brook, but had a duty to maintain some flow on the brook, to power Whittington Mill. The judge found in their favour, and ruled that water could only be extracted when the flow of the brook exceeded 150 cubic feet (4.2 m^{3}) per minute. The production of flour is thought to have stopped around 1900, and the milling of animal feed in the early 1920s. The Elliots then used the building as a joinery workshop. In 1962, it was noted that the building had four storeys, but only one wheel, and although it had been unused for some time, all the equipment and the miller's tools were still there. In 2000 the building only had three storeys, with a slate roof, and the long thin mill pond alongside the railway had been filled in. A garden centre and car park have since been built over the site of the mill pond, although the mill building still stands in the grounds.

== Water quality ==
The Environment Agency measure the water quality of the river systems in England. Each is given an overall ecological status, which may be one of five levels: high, good, moderate, poor and bad. Several components are used to determine this, including biological status, which looks at the quantity and varieties of invertebrates, angiosperms and fish. Chemical status, which compares the concentrations of various chemicals against known safe concentrations, is rated good or fail.

The water quality of the River Drone, which appears to include the branch that originates near Bentley Hall Farm but not those that originate near Dore and Totley, Mickley or Jordanthorpe, was as follows in 2019.

Section	Ecological Status	Chemical Status	Length	Catchment	Channel
Drone/Whitting from Source to River Rother	Moderate	Fail	6.0 miles (9.7 km)	9.56 square miles (24.8 km^{2})	heavily modified

The river has not been classed as good quality because of physical modification of the channel, and because it is affected by discharges from sewage treatment works. Like many rivers in the UK, the chemical status changed from good to fail in 2019 because of the presence of cypermethrin, polybrominated diphenyl ethers (PBDE), perfluorooctane sulphonate (PFOS), and mercury compounds, none of which had previously been included in the assessment.

== Bibliography ==
- Hodson, John (February 2020). "Some Mills and Millers of Whittington" (PDF). Newsletter No. 77. North East Derbyshire Industrial Archaeology Society.
