= South Yorkshire Forest =

Conservation initiative

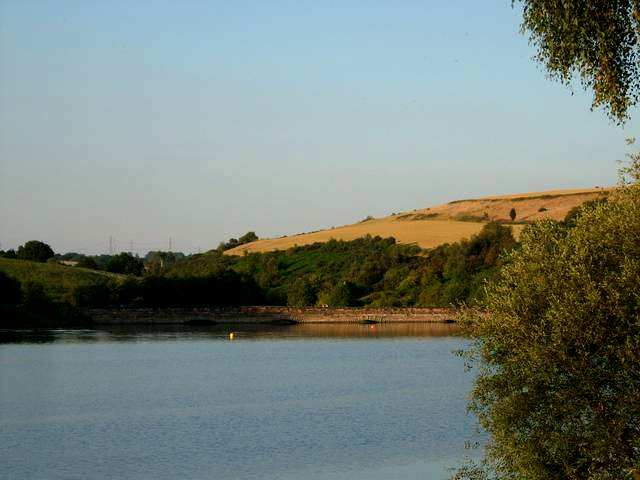
Ulley Reservoir. Ulley Country park was originally built as a reservoir in the 1870s to provide the town of Rotherham with drinking water. Situated within the South Yorkshire Forest, it is a scenic haven for wildlife

The South Yorkshire Forest was a partnership initiative of the twelve Community Forests in England, started in 1991. The programme aimed to create attractive landscapes in the South Yorkshire area through improvement and regeneration of woodlands, wetlands, farmland, meadows, industrial sites and residential areas. Member organisations of the South Yorkshire Forest Partnership included the Forestry Commission, Natural England and the four local authorities of South Yorkshire: Sheffield City Council, Doncaster Metropolitan Borough Council, Barnsley Metropolitan Borough Council and Rotherham Metropolitan Borough Council.

Between 2005 and 2015, the South Yorkshire Forest Partnership (SYFP) led a series of large and high profile projects with the support of the European Union, investing millions of pounds to improve South Yorkshire's environmental quality with local communities. SYFP was responsible for managing initiatives with partners in over 50 cities and regions, spanning North West Europe and the North Sea Region. These projects included:

- VALUE+ (VALUE-Added).
- SEEDS - Stimulating enterprising environments for development and sustainability (SEEDS).
- APACHES - Attractive Public Areas Cluster (APACHES).
- Valuing Attractive Landscapes in the Urban Economy (VALUE).
- MP4 - Making Places Profitable (MP4).
- Creating a Setting for Investment (CSI) (Creating a Setting for Investment).

It also hosted three major international conferences in Sheffield:

- SEEDS (2015) SEEDS Conference.
- Green Growth New Shoots (2012) Green Growth New Shoots Conference.
- Making Places Profitable (2006) Making Places Profitable Conference.

South Yorkshire Forest Partnership was closed in 2016. From its inception to its closure, SYFP planted over 1 million trees, and invested over £32 million in South Yorkshire.

== See also ==
- Community Forests in England
