= Ulley Reservoir =

Reservoir in South Yorkshire, England

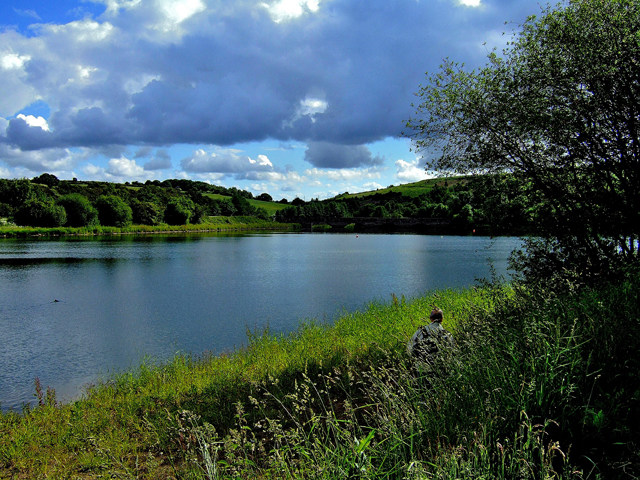
- The reservoir in the sun

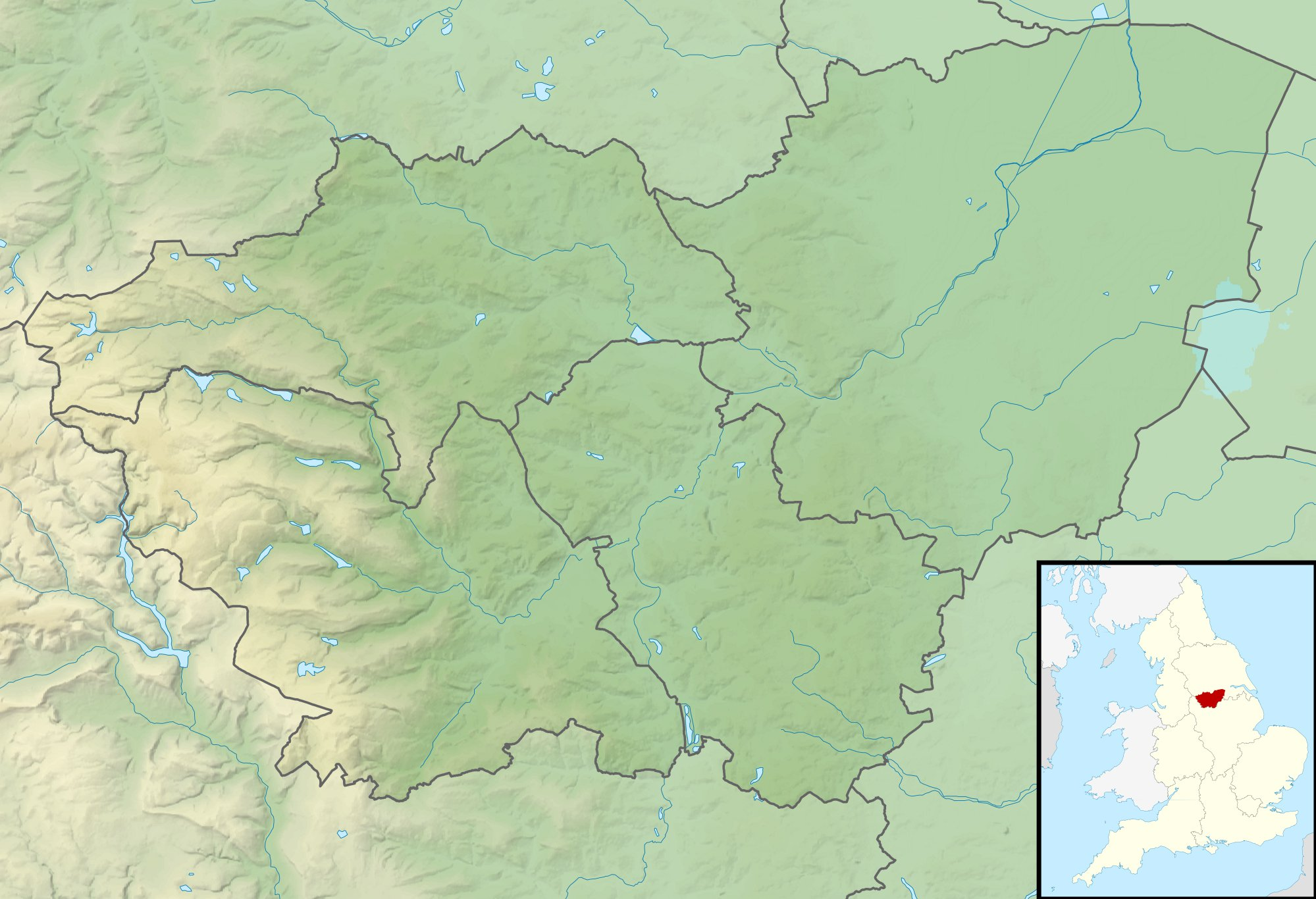
- Location in South Yorkshire
- Location: South Yorkshire
- Coordinates: 53.3800°N 1.3140°W
- Type: reservoir
- Primary inflows: Ulley and Morthen brooks
- Basin countries: United Kingdom
- Surface area: 35 acres (14 ha)
- Average depth: 36 feet (11 m)

Ulley Reservoir is a reservoir a few hundred yards to the west and downhill of the village of Ulley, 4 miles (6.4 km) south of Rotherham, South Yorkshire, England. It is 2.5 miles (4 km) away from junction 33 of the M1 motorway.

== History ==
The reservoir was built in 1871 by damming the brooks of Ulley and Morthen, to provide the town of Rotherham with approximately 180 million gallons (820 million litres) of drinking water per year. The reservoir is divided in two by a road bridge carrying Reservoir Road; one half is used for angling and dinghy sailing, and the other is now a nature reserve.

The dam is an earth embankment made of a clay core and earth filled shoulders. In 1969 the dam wall was built up by 6.6 feet (2 m) with plastic concrete and relevelled. The spillways and overflow are made of ashlar pitching set on concrete. It is 41.3 feet (12.6 m) in height with a slope of 12.7 degrees, with two lateral overflow stepped spillways. The reservoir covers an area of 35 acres (14 ha) and is about 46 feet (14 m) deep.

In the 1980s it was decided that it was no longer needed for water supplies and was sold to Rotherham council for £1. The council turned the venue into the centrepiece of Ulley Country Park, with the water hosting sailing and fishing.

== Ecology ==
The reservoir and the surrounding country park are a haven for a variety of wildlife. Over 150 species of flowering plants have been recorded in the park, creating an abundance of both insects and butterflies. The bird species include; mallard, tufted duck, little grebe, great crested grebe, coot, moorhen, kingfisher, grey heron, swallow, swift, house martin and kestrel.

== June 2007 cracks in the dam ==
On 25 June 2007, cracks in the reservoir walls were found after heavy rains and flooding in the area, causing concerns that the reservoir might burst, prompting the evacuation of the three nearest villages Whiston, Treeton and Catcliffe. The UK is one of the world's most secretive countries when it comes to dam inundation information due to fears of a malicious attack and as such, information was not readily available to emergency responders. This resulted in an improvised evacuation as there was no formal evacuation plan in place. Several other areas as far away as Canklow were put on emergency flood alert. The M1 motorway was also closed between junctions 32 and 36 amid fears over safety. This led to 700 local residents being evacuated from their homes. Fire crews used seventeen high volume pumps to remove four million litres of water per hour from the reservoir.

The possibility of the dam being susceptible to cracking had been discussed in 1970, at a conference about problems with dams of a similar age and construction.

It was feared that, if the reservoir's dam was breached, the sudden flow of water could bring down high voltage power lines, and flood the nearby M1 and a crucial regional electricity substation, which supplies the power to the whole of Sheffield.
