= Whiteborough railway station =

Former railway station in Nottinghamshire, England

Whiteborough

General information
- Location: Huthwaite, Ashfield District, Nottinghamshire; England
- Coordinates: 53.1362°N 1.3155°W
- Platforms: 2

Other information
- Status: Disused

History
- Original company: Midland Railway
- Post-grouping: London, Midland and Scottish Railway

Key dates
- 1883: opened
- 4 October 1926: closed to passengers
Location

Whiteborough railway station was a railway station serving the village of Huthwaite, Nottinghamshire, England on the Midland Railway's line from Westhouses and Blackwell in to Mansfield Woodhouse line. The line opened in 1883, following the opening of Pleasley Colliery in 1878. It closed to passengers in 1926.

Preceding station	Disused railways	Following station
Tibshelf & Newton; Line and station closed	Midland Railway	Teversall Manor; Line and station closed
