= Mansfield Woodhouse railway station =

Railway station in Nottinghamshire, England

Coordinates: 53°09′47″N 01°12′05″W

Mansfield Woodhouse
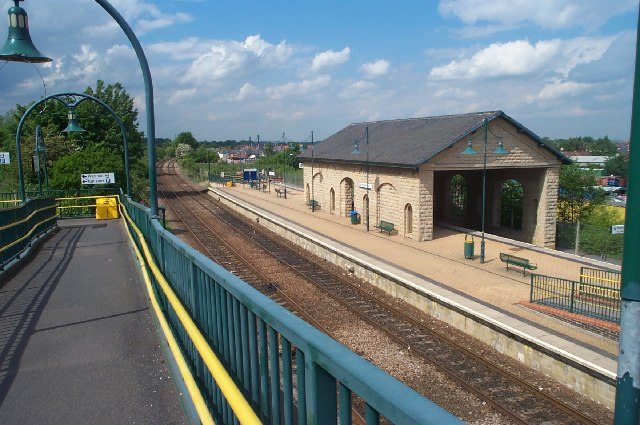

General information
- Location: Mansfield Woodhouse, Mansfield; England
- Grid reference: SK534632
- Manager: East Midlands Railway
- Platforms: 3

Other information
- Station code: MSW
- Classification: DfT category F2

Key dates
- 1875: opened
- 1964: closed
- 1995: opened

Passengers
- 2021/22: ▲88,452
- 2022/23: ▲0.111 million
- 2023/24: ▲0.116 million
- 2024/25: ▲0.123 million
- 2025/26: 0.123 million
Location
Notes
- Passenger statistics from the Office of Rail and Road

Mansfield Woodhouse railway station serves the town of Mansfield Woodhouse, which adjoins Mansfield, both located in Nottinghamshire, England.

The station is on the Robin Hood Line between Nottingham and Worksop. It was originally closed in 1964 but was reopened in 1995.

== History ==
The original station was opened for goods traffic in April 1875 and for passenger traffic on 1 June 1875 when the Midland Railway built a 15 miles (24 km) branch line from Mansfield to Worksop. Stations were erected at Mansfield Woodhouse, Shirebrook, Langwith, Cresswell and Whitwell. They were all built of stone except for the one at Mansfield Woodhouse, which was built entirely in wood.

== Branch line ==
A branch line veered west approximately half a mile north of the station. This single track line, known as "The Pleasley extension", ran through Pleasley Vale to Pleasley West station, and then it split into two.

One line turned sharply north and became the Doe Lea Branch, which wound a very circuitous route through Rowthorne, Glapwell, Bolsover, Barrow Hill and Whittington to Chesterfield. It closed to normal passenger traffic in 1930 and the section between Pleasley and Glapwell was lifted. Coal continued to go out northwards from Glapwell Colliery until it closed in 1974.

The other line continued south west through Teversal and Tibshelf to Westhouses. That line also lost its sparse passenger service in 1930, but remarkably, excursions and summer specials called at Pleasley West and Mansfield Woodhouse up to 1963. The line between Pleasley West and the junction north of Mansfield Woodhouse was closed and lifted in 1964 after which coal from the collieries on the line all went southwards to Westhouses. One by one these collieries closed and all tracks through Pleasley West became redundant and were lifted. Mansfield Woodhouse closed to passenger services in 1964.

Parts of the trackbed and those of neighbouring lines have been turned into public footpaths and bridleways.

== Services ==
All services at Mansfield Woodhouse are operated by East Midlands Railway.

During the weekday off-peak and on Saturdays, the station is generally served by an hourly service northbound to Worksop and southbound to Nottingham. During the peak hours, the station is also served by an additional two trains per day to and from Nottingham which start and terminate at Mansfield Woodhouse.

On Sundays, the station is served by a two-hourly service to Nottingham, with no service to Worksop. Sunday services to Worksop are due to recommence at the station during the life of the East Midlands franchise.

Preceding station	National Rail	Following station
Mansfield	East Midlands Railway Robin Hood Line	Shirebrook or Terminus
	Disused railways	
Mansfield Line and station open	Midland Railway Doe Lea Line	Pleasley West Line and station closed
