= Palterton and Sutton railway station =

Former railway station in Derbyshire, England

Palterton and Sutton
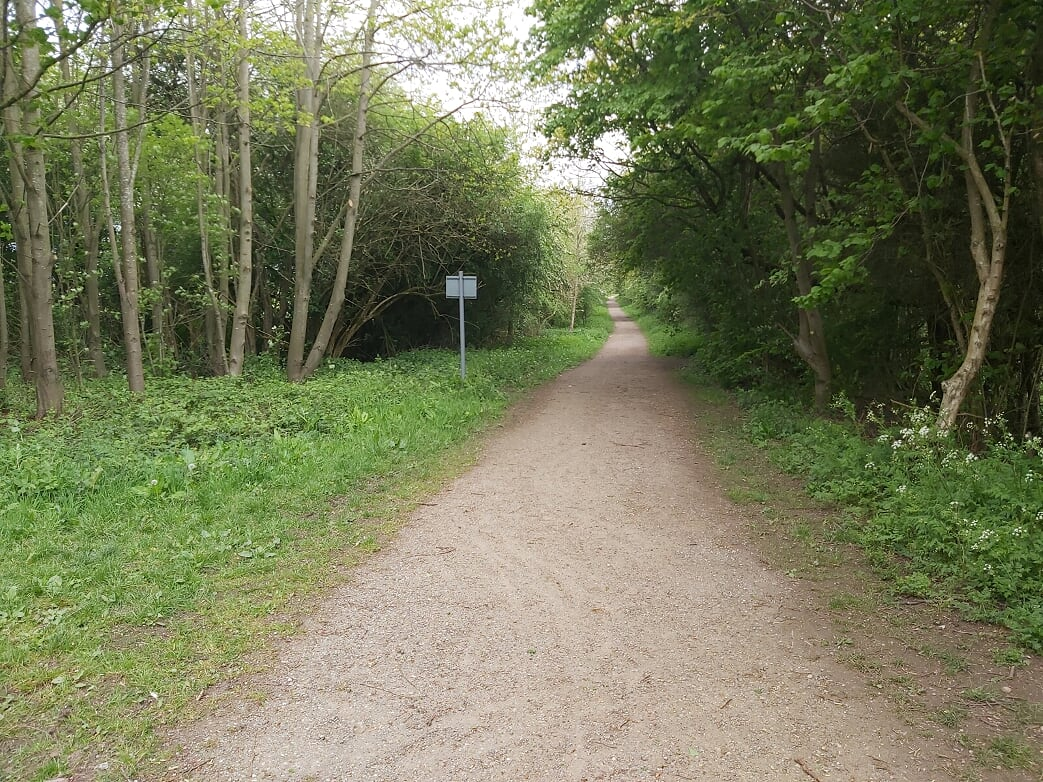

General information
- Location: Between Palterton and Sutton Scarsdale, Bolsover; England
- Coordinates: 53°13′2″N 1°18′35″W
- Grid reference: SK 467 691
- Platforms: 1

Other information
- Status: Disused

History
- Original company: Midland Railway
- Post-grouping: LMSR

Key dates
- 1 September 1890: opened
- 28 July 1930: Passenger service withdrawn
- Dec 1939: Goods services withdrawn
Location

Palterton and Sutton is a former railway station between Palterton and Sutton Scarsdale, Derbyshire, England.

== Context ==
The station was built by the Midland Railway on the circuitous Barrow Hill to Pleasley West line known as the Doe Lea Branch, because it ran for much of its length along the valley of the River Doe Lea.

== History ==
The station was opened without ceremony on 1 September 1890 as "Palterton and Sutton". It initially provided a service of three trains each way between Mansfield and Chesterfield, taking about an hour from end to end.

The line was single track between Seymour Junction and Pleasley West. Accordingly, the station had a single platform.

Normal passenger traffic along the Doe Lea Branch dwindled over the years and finally ceased on 28 July 1930. The last steam train to use the line was an enthusiasts' special on 16 October 1965. This train also traversed the Clowne Branch.

When Glapwell Colliery closed in 1974 the line South of Bolsover Castle station became redundant, though it was not lifted until 1978. The station has been demolished.

The trackbed through the station South from Bolsover Castle through the site of Palterton and Sutton station to the bottom of Rylah Hill between Palterton and M1 J29 is now a public bridleway known as The Stockley Trail.

| Preceding station | Disused railways | Following station |
|---|---|---|
| Bolsover Castle; Line and station closed | Midland Railway; Doe Lea Branch | Glapwell; Line and station closed |
