= Bolsover Castle railway station =

Former railway station in Derbyshire, England

Bolsover Castle
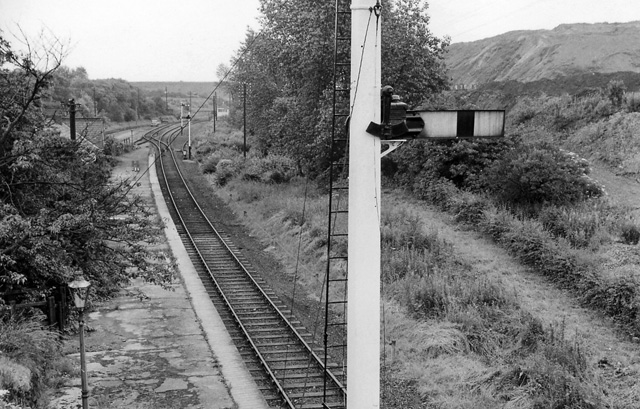
- The station site, in the late 1950s/early 1960s

General information
- Location: Bolsover, Borough of Bolsover, England
- Coordinates: 53°13′56″N 1°18′31″W
- Grid reference: SK 462 706
- Platforms: 1

Other information
- Status: Disused

History
- Original company: Midland Railway
- Post-grouping: London, Midland and Scottish Railway; British Railways

Key dates
- 1 September 1890: Opened as Bolsover
- 28 July 1930: Timetabled passenger service withdrawn
- 25 September 1950: Renamed Bolsover Castle
- 1 November 1962: Goods service withdrawn
- 16 August 1981: Last miners' welfare special ran
- 1985-99: Station demolished
Location

Bolsover Castle was one of two former railway stations that served the town of Bolsover, (Note: The other station was Bolsover South.) in Derbyshire, England, between 1890 and 1981. It was built by the Midland Railway on the circuitous Barrow Hill to Pleasley West line, known as the Doe Lea Branch, running for much of its length along the valley of the river Doe Lea.

== History ==
The station was opened without ceremony on 1 September 1890 as Bolsover. It initially provided a service of three trains each way between Mansfield and Chesterfield, taking about an hour from end to end.

The line was single tracked between Seymour Junction and Pleasley West. Accordingly, the station had a single platform and typical Midland Railway country building that was very similar to those at Clowne and Barlborough and Glapwell.

In 1897, the Doe Lea Viaduct was opened, straddling the Doe Lea Branch for a short distance to the south of the station.

Normal passenger traffic along the Doe Lea Branch dwindled over the years and finally ceased on 28 July 1930. An unadvertised service continued to call at the station until 14 August 1931 and pre-war excursions continued until at least 27 July 1939. Records show that a half-day excursion service called at Bolsover on 26 July 1949, on its way to Bridlington and Scarborough. The last steam train to use the line was an enthusiasts' special on 16 October 1965. This train also traversed the Clowne Branch.

British Railways renamed the station Bolsover Castle on 25 September 1950, to help distinguish it from the Lancashire, Derbyshire and East Coast Railway's station, which became Bolsover South. Goods facilities were withdrawn from the station on 1 November 1962.

Although regular passenger traffic ceased in 1930 and the line was severed as a through route shortly thereafter by the closure of Rowthorn Tunnel, occasional specials continued to call at the station. A special was run to Chesterfield in connection with the Silver Jubilee celebrations in Queen's Park on 28 July 1977. This had been on the initiative of the headmaster of Bolsover Church of England Junior School, as there were insufficient buses to take all the children to the event. Thereafter, there were annual August excursions from 1978 until 1981, organised by Bolsover Miners' Welfare, when trains of at least nine coaches ran to Scarborough. Another source claims that the last charter from Bolsover Castle was a nine-coach train to London Liverpool Street, via Chesterfield, on 15 November 1980, organised by Bolsover Secondary School's Parent-Teacher Association.

When Glapwell Colliery closed in 1974, the line south of the station became redundant, although it was not lifted until 1978.

Preceding station	Disused railways	Following station
Staveley Town; Line and station closed	Midland Railway; Doe Lea Branch	Palterton and Sutton; Line and station closed

=== Stationmasters ===
- Job Frederick Fisher 1890-1891
- W. Hackett 1891-1892
- Herbert Mason Read 1892-1893 (afterwards station master at Watnall)
- Richard Grice 1893-1896 (formerly station master at Killamarsh, later station master at Darfield)
- William Henry Johnson 1896-1899 (later station master at Ullesthorpe)
- Herbert H. Willis 1899-1902
- John Daniel Neale 1902-1904 (later station master at Shipley Gate)
- John William Palmer 1904 (formerly station master at Glapwell)
- Harry York 1904-1908 (formerly station master at Attercliffe Road, later station master at Worthington)
- George H. Dewey 1908-1911 (formerly station master at Worthington, later station master at Burton Joyce)
- Samuel Palfreyman 1911-1920 (later station master at Swinton)
- Ernest C. Beckley 1921-1924
- G.P. Kirland ca. 1940.

== The site today ==
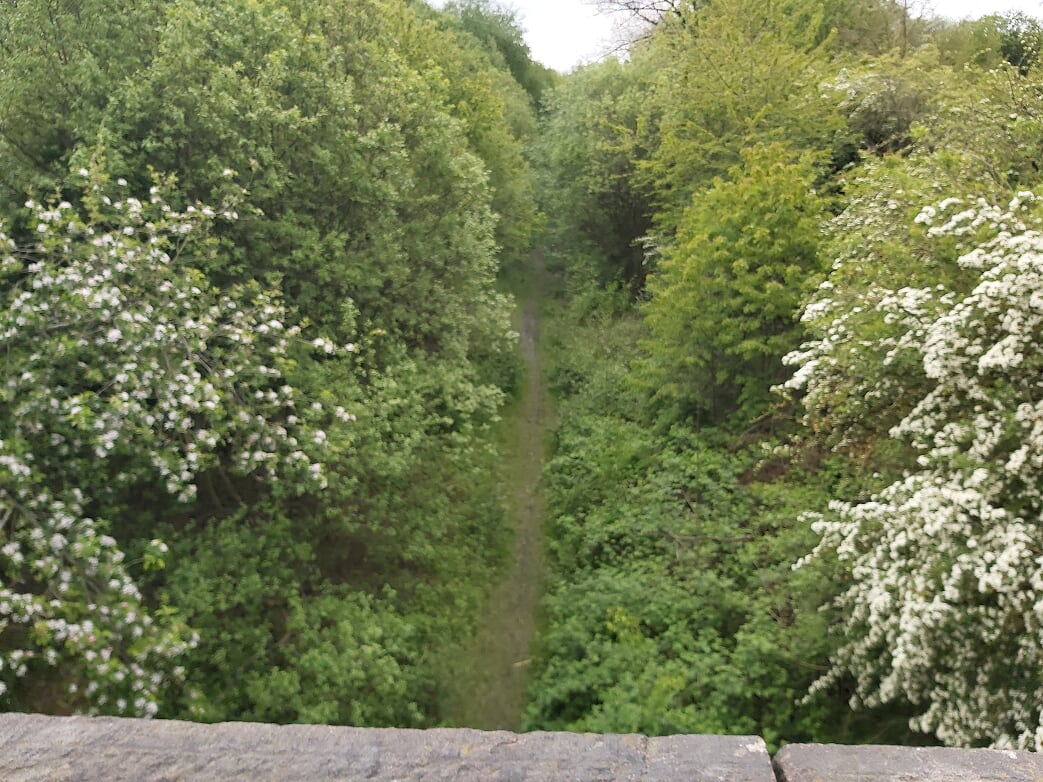
The site of the station, 2021

By 20 July 2013, all tracks through Bolsover Castle station site had been lifted, but the trackbed was intact. The station itself was demolished some years ago. A business park had been developed immediately west of the station site. One occupant is a firm providing road-rail vehicles, such as track welding lorries fitted with retractable rail wheels. A length of track with dummy overhead wires, presumably for training and clearance testing purposes, has been installed in their depot in plain view from public areas.

The branch between Bolsover Castle and the bottom of Rylah Hill, between Palterton and junction 29 of the M1, is now a public bridleway known as the Stockley Trail.

The Doe Lea Line south from Seymour Junction to the site of the former Markham Colliery (now known as the Bolsover Branch) has been mothballed as it runs through the new Markham Vale Enterprise Zone at junction 29A of the M1 motorway.

== Possible future ==
The line from Foxlow Junction to Oxcroft Disposal Point, through Seymour Junction, has been lifted. It has been protected from breach or encroachment, as there remains the possibility of opencasting in the area; for example, UK Coal (now Coalfield Resources) expressed an interest in 2005 in extracting c. 530,000 tons near Mastin Moor.
