= Tibshelf & Newton railway station =

Former railway station in Derbyshire, England

Tibshelf & Newton
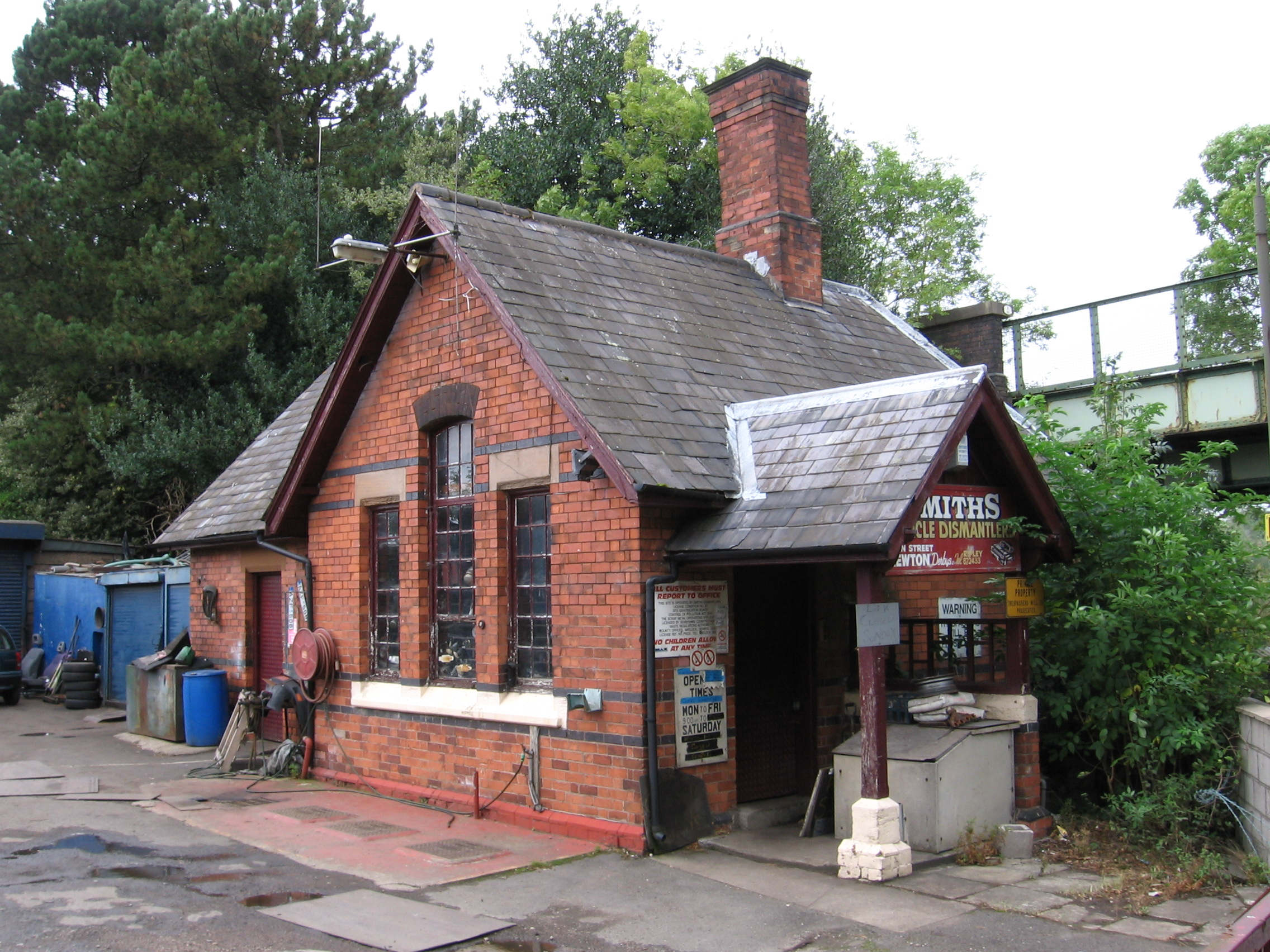
- The station building as it stood in 2007.

General information
- Location: Tibshelf, Bolsover; England
- Coordinates: 53.133665°N 1.346241°W

Other information
- Status: Disused

History
- Original company: Midland Railway
- Post-grouping: London, Midland and Scottish Railway

Key dates
- 1 May 1886: opened
- 28 July 1930: Line closed to passengers
Location

Tibshelf & Newton railway station was on the Midland Railway's line from Westhouses in Derbyshire to Mansfield Woodhouse. The line opened in 1883, following the opening of Pleasley Colliery in 1878. It closed to passengers in 1930.

Preceding station	Disused railways	Following station
Westhouses and Blackwall; Line and station closed	Midland Railway	Whiteborough; Line and station closed
