= Teversall Manor railway station =

Former railway station in Nottinghamshire, England

Teversall Manor
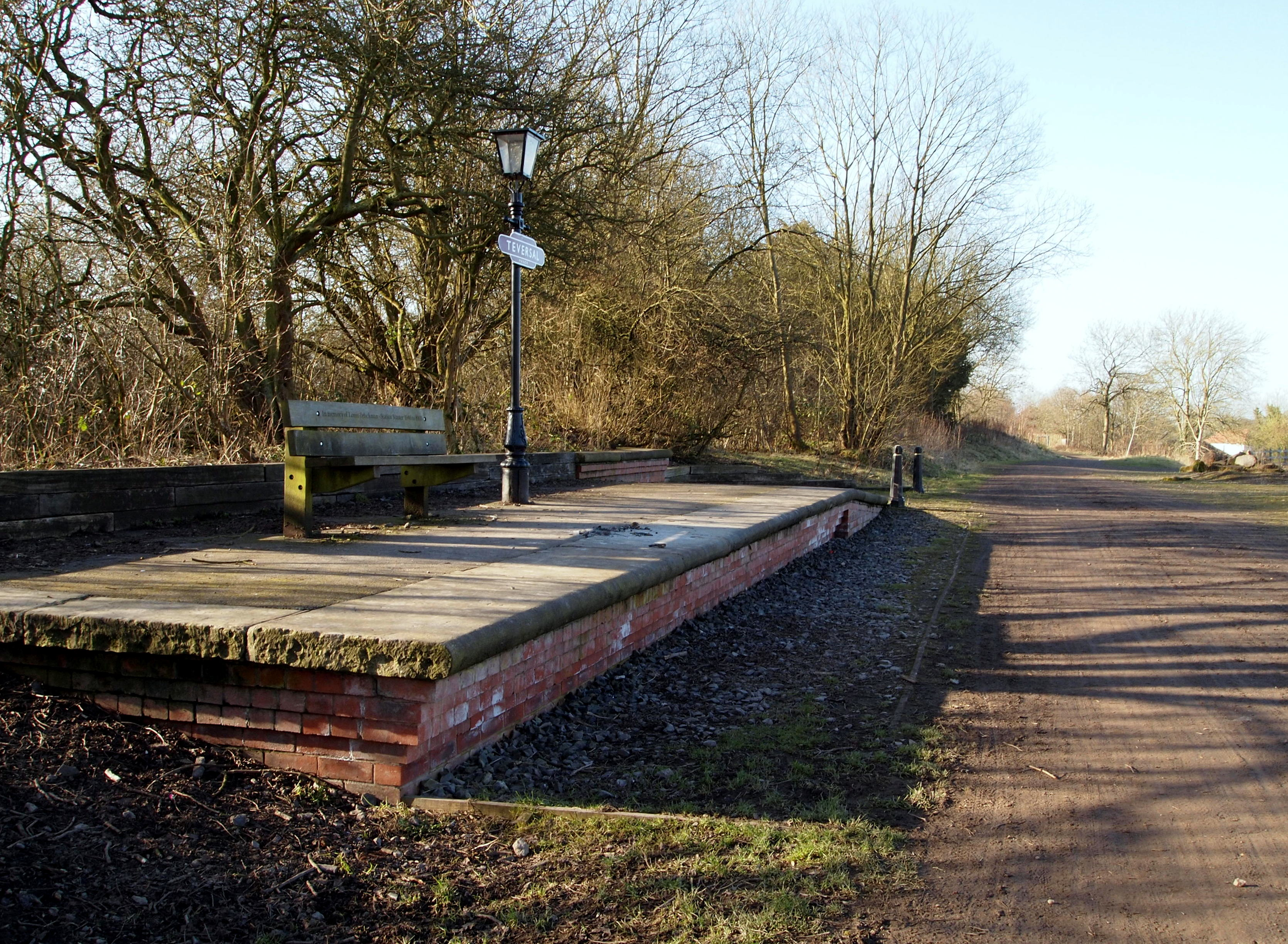
- The site of the station in 2013

General information
- Location: Teversal, Ashfield, Nottinghamshire; England
- Coordinates: 53°8′55″N 1°17′9″W
- Grid reference: SK 479 617
- Platforms: 1

Other information
- Status: Disused

History
- Original company: Midland Railway
- Post-grouping: LMSR

Key dates
- 1 May 1886: Opened as Teversall
- 28 July 1930: Closed to regular passenger traffic
- July 1950: Renamed Teversall Manor
- 7 October 1963: Closed completely, last excursion ran
- 1992: Silverhill Colliery closed
Location

Teversall Manor is a former railway station in Teversal, Nottinghamshire, England. It was located on the border with Derbyshire, west of Mansfield. The station was a stop on the Midland Railway's line from Tibshelf and Whiteborough to Pleasley West, known as the Teversall & Pleasley Branch. The line's primary purpose was to transport coal.

== History ==
The station was opened without ceremony on 1 May 1886, when the Teversall & Pleasley Branch opened to passenger traffic. It initially provided a service of four trains each way between Mansfield and Alfreton via Mansfield Woodhouse and Tibshelf Town, taking about 40 minutes from end to end.

The station had a typical Midland Railway country station building, very similar to Pleasley West.

By 1922, the passenger service through the station was down to three trains each way Monday to Saturday; there never was a Sunday service. By 1930, this had fallen to one train a day southbound and, curiously, two a day northbound. On 28 July 1930, passenger services were withdrawn.

As the station remained open for goods, it was renamed Teversall Manor in 1950, to avoid confusion with the obscure ex-GNR terminus station nearby.

Excursions and railtours continued until 1963. Through traffic was rendered impossible from 1964, when the line north from Pleasley Colliery to the junction with what is now the Robin Hood Line closed. Pleasley Colliery subsequently sent its coal underground to Shirebrook and Teversall Colliery; thus closed in 1980. Coal continued to be dug from Silverhill Colliery until 1992 and passed through the site of Teversall Manor station. After the colliery closed, the line became redundant and the track was subsequently lifted; the station buildings were razed to the ground.

Preceding station	Disused railways	Following station
Whiteborough	LMSR; Midland Railway	Pleasley West

== The two stations in Teversal ==
There were two stations in Teversal: one built by the Midland Railway on a line running south–north from Whiteborough to Pleasley West; the other was built by the Great Northern Railway at the end of a one-mile branch line westwards from Skegby. From inception they were both called Teversall with two "l"s.

Despite being fully equipped with a building and platform, the Great Northern station only ever carried unadvertised workmen's trains and seaside excursions. It does not appear in the 1922 Bradshaw's Guide or later timetables. It was visited by a Stephenson Locomotive Society Farewell enthusiasts' special on 4 May 1968.

The ex-Midland line bridged the ex-GNR line in Teversal and the stations were fairly close to each other, the ex-Midland station being on the higher level.

After nationalisation in 1948, the early British Railways had a policy of renaming stations where confusion over names could occur, typically in towns and villages where two or more stations existed. Teversal had two stations so, although one had closed to regular passenger services and the other had never provided any, they provided other services such as goods and excursions; they were therefore renamed.

The ex-MR Teversal station became Teversall Manor and the ex-GNR Teversal station became Teversall East.

== The site today ==
Parts of the trackbed of this and neighbouring lines have been turned into public footpaths and bridleways.
