= Glapwell railway station =

Former railway station in Derbyshire, England

Glapwell
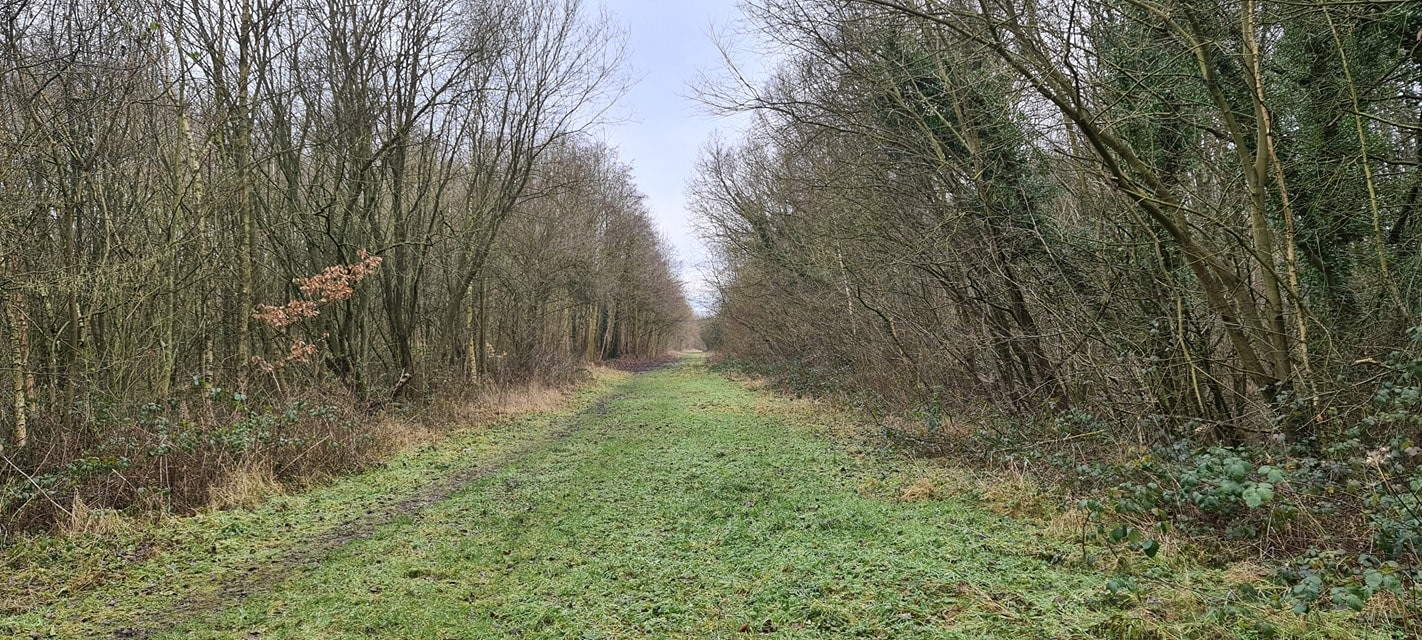

General information
- Location: Glapwell, Bolsover; England
- Coordinates: 53°11′26″N 1°18′9″W
- Grid reference: SK 466 662
- Platforms: 1

Other information
- Status: Disused

History
- Original company: Midland Railway
- Pre-grouping: Midland Railway
- Post-grouping: London, Midland and Scottish Railway

Key dates
- 1 September 1892 (or 22 August 1892): Opened
- 28 July 1930: Closed completely
Location

Glapwell is a former railway station in Glapwell, Derbyshire, England.

== Context ==
The station was built by the Midland Railway on the circuitous Barrow Hill to Pleasley West line known as the Doe Lea Branch, because it ran for much of its length along the valley of the River Doe Lea.

Preceding station	Disused railways	Following station
Palterton and Sutton; Line and station closed	Midland Railway; Doe Lea Branch	Rowthorn and Hardwick; Line and station closed

== History ==
The line was opened without ceremony on 1 September 1890, but no station was built at Glapwell. Pressure from the residents of Bramley Vale led to one being built and opened on 1 September 1892 as "Glapwell". It initially provided a service of three trains each way between Mansfield and Chesterfield, taking about an hour from end to end.

The line was single track between Seymour Junction and Pleasley West. Accordingly, the station had a single platform and a typical MR country station building, very similar to Clowne and Barlborough and Bolsover Castle.

Normal passenger traffic along the Doe Lea Branch dwindled over the years and finally ceased on 28 July 1930. Glapwell Colliery was still going strong at this time. As its sidings left the passenger line to the North of the station and all coal went out northwards, the station was abandoned along with the track southwards through Rowthorn Tunnel to Pleasley Colliery West Junction a short distance South of Pleasley West. The station building was not destroyed and by the early 1970s was used by an evangelical Christian group.

The last steam train to use the line was an enthusiasts' special on 16 October 1965. This train also traversed the Clowne Branch.

When Glapwell Colliery closed in 1974 the line South of Bolsover Castle station became redundant, though it was not lifted until 1978.

The trackbed south from Bolsover Castle almost to Glapwell at the bottom of Rylah Hill between Palterton and M1 J29 is now a public bridleway known as The Stockley Trail.
