= Huwood power loader =

The Huwood Power Loader was mechanical device of roughly 6 ft by 2 ft by 1 ft dimensions and powered by a 10 hp engine, used to move cut coal from the coal face on to the conveyor. The machine was equipped with winches which used haulage ropes to drag the machine along the coal face and used both horizontal and rotary motions to shift the coal onto the conveyor. Pleasley Colliery, Derbyshire introduced one of the first such loaders in 1950.

== See also ==
- Meco-Moore Cutter Loader
- Anderton Shearer Loader
