= Anderton Shearer Loader =

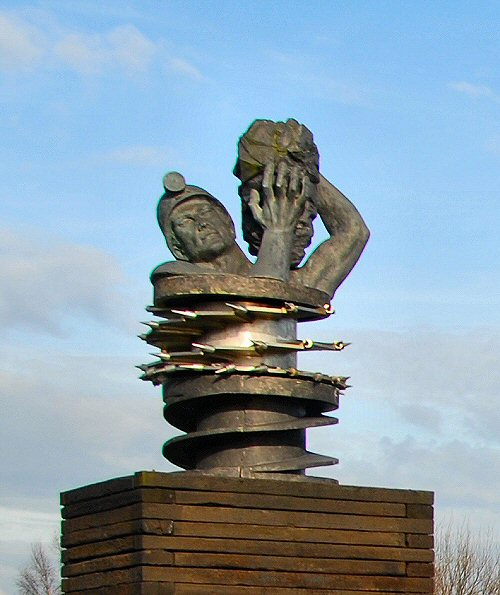
Monument to James Anderton and the Anderton Shearer Loader

The Anderton Shearer Loader is a coal cutting machine which was used in the UK coal industry after 1953. The Anderton Power Loader with its cutting drum up to five feet in diameter was patented in 1953. It was successfully used throughout the British coalfields and by 1966 cut half the coal produced and by 1977 it produced 80% of the coal mined in Britain.

The Shearer Loader was mainly developed by James Anderton OBE, who was the National Coal Board (St Helens Area) production manager and later chairman of the NCB's North-Western Division. The first Anderton shearer loader was commissioned in 1954. It was utilised by Anderton's employers at Groves Ravenhead Colliery in St Helens.

The machine works by "shearing" coal from a longwall coal face as it moved along the face. The shear drum is around 0.5 metres in diameter and the machine travels on an armoured conveyor with a prop-free front. The machine shears going one way and the coal at the front is deflected by a plough onto the conveyor. On the machine's return it knocks the rest of the coal onto the conveyor. The Shearer was usually used on seams thicker than a metre and produced small coal suitable for power stations.

== See also ==
- Meco-Moore Cutter Loader
- Huwood Power Loader
