= Pleasley =

Village in Derbyshire and Nottinghamshire, England

Coordinates: 53.17345°N 1.25044°W

- Village and civil parish
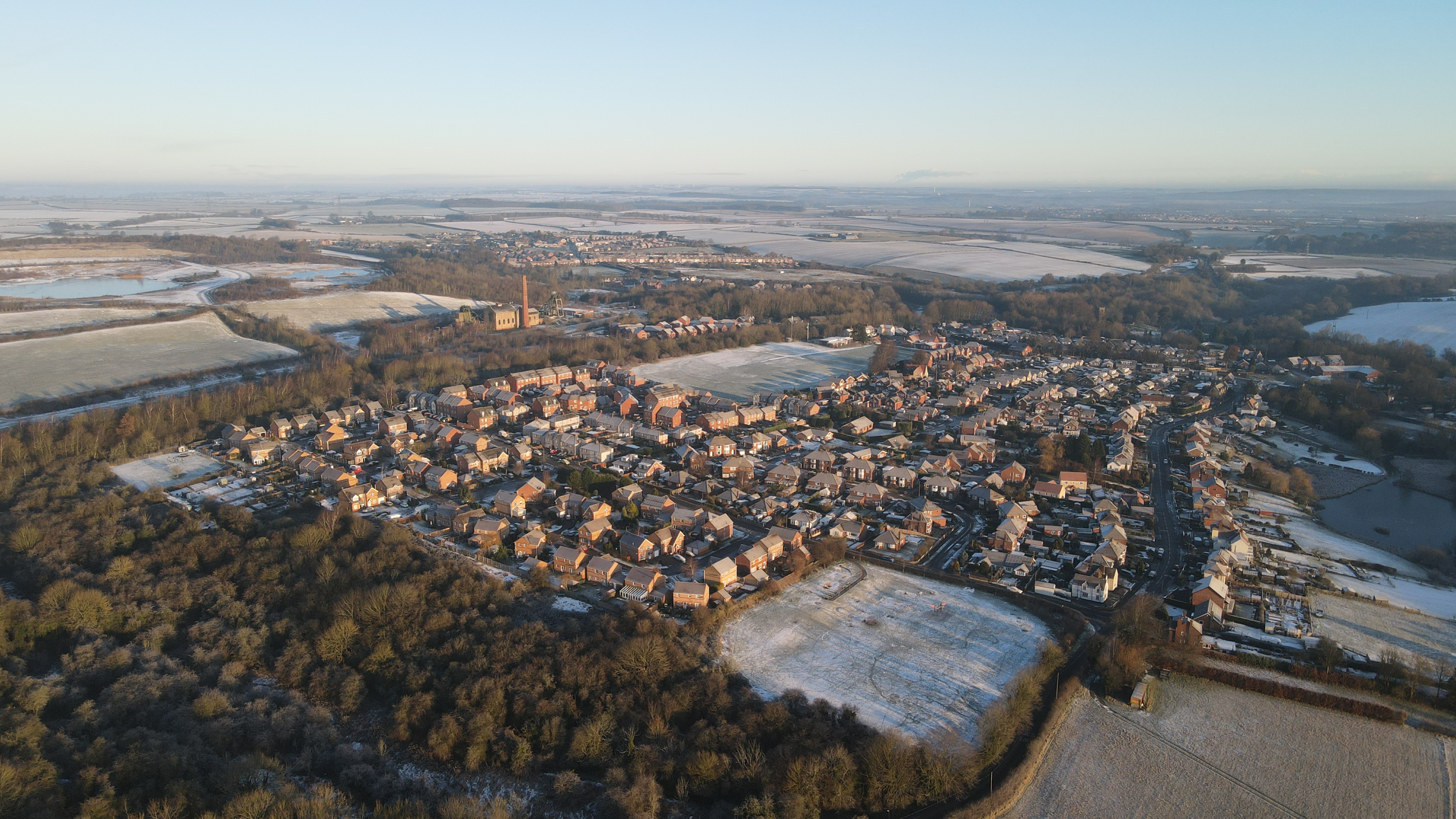
- Pleasley Village

- Location within Derbyshire
- Population: 2,305 (Bolsover Civil Parish. 2011)
- OS grid reference: SK502643
- District: Bolsover and Mansfield
- Shire county: Derbyshire
- Region: East Midlands
- Country: England
- Sovereign state: United Kingdom
- Post town: MANSFIELD
- Postcode district: NG19
- Dialling code: 01623
- Police: Derbyshire
- Fire: Derbyshire
- Ambulance: East Midlands
- UK Parliament: Bolsover -Derbyshire section of Pleasley Ashfield -Nottinghamshire section of Pleasley
- Website: https://pleasleyparishcouncil.gov.uk/

Pleasley is a village and civil parish with parts in both Derbyshire and Nottinghamshire. It lies between Chesterfield and Mansfield, 5 miles (8 km) south east of Bolsover, Derbyshire, England and 2.5 miles (4 km) north west of Mansfield, Nottinghamshire. The River Meden, which forms the county boundary in this area, runs through the village.

The bulk of the village is in the Derbyshire district of Bolsover, and constitutes a civil parish of the same name. The population of this civil parish at the 2011 Census was 2,305. The part in Nottinghamshire is in the district of Mansfield and is unparished. Pleasley is not mentioned in the Domesday Book when it was part of Glapwell parish.

== History ==
The parish church of St. Michael is built of squared sandstone and is believed to originate from the 12th century, as it includes a 12th-century chancel arch and font. There are also features from the 13th and 14th century, and evidence of significant restoration in the 19th century, when it was re-roofed in Welsh slate. A new south window was fitted in the chancel at this time. The pulpit came from Derby Cathedral, and there is a second font, which carries the date 1662. The building is a grade II* listed structure. It is situated close to the River Meden which marks the county boundary and also the boundary of the ancient Sherwood Forest.

=== Industrial Revolution ===
George Sitwell, ironmaster, mined iron locally and at Pleasley built a furnace, a forge and power saws in the seventeenth century.

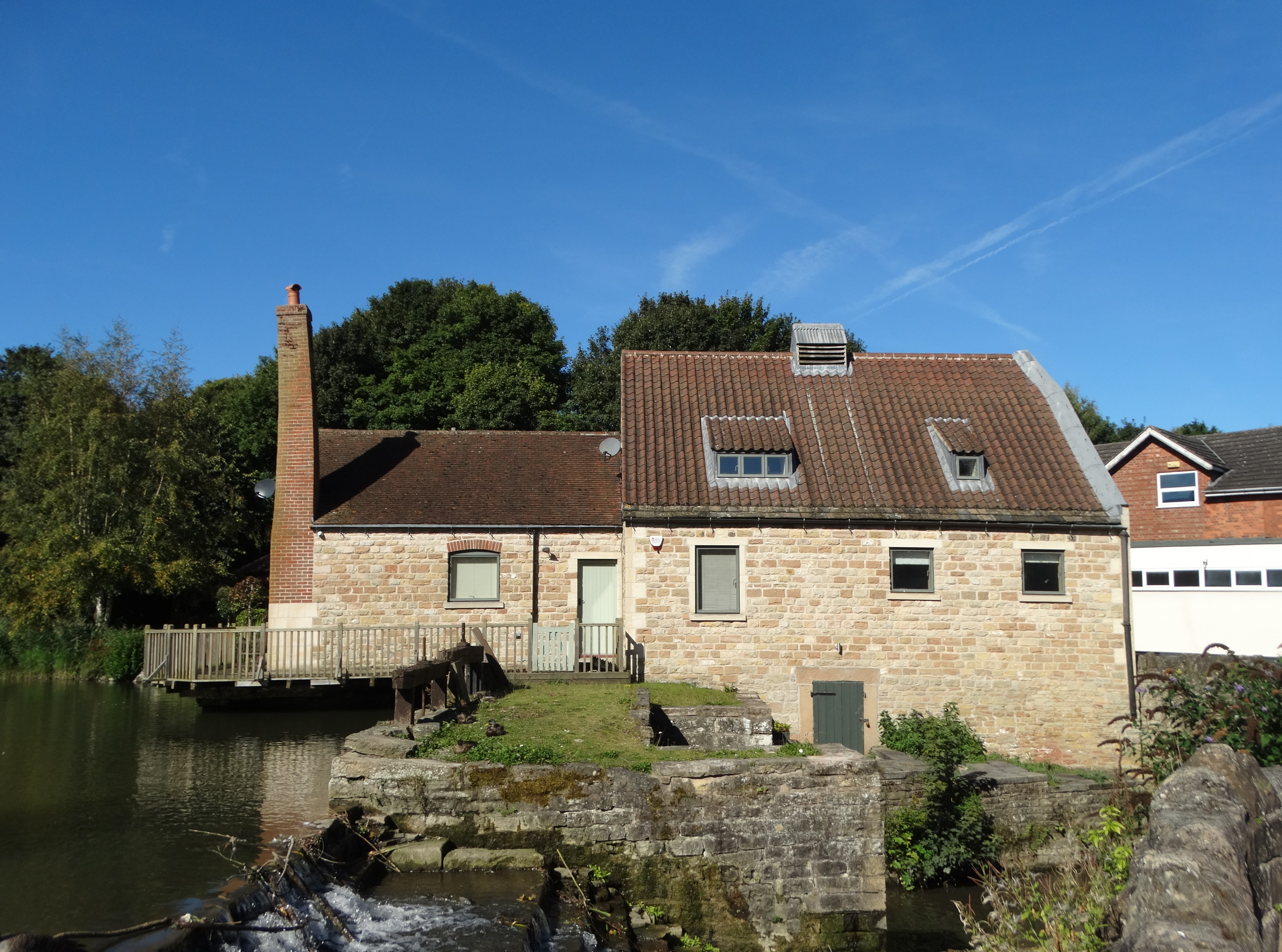
Water flowing over the dam with renovated former mill building in Old Pleasley village

Pleasley was a coal mining village for over 100 years. The Stanton Ironworks Company leased the mineral rights in 1872, and work on building the shaft for Pleasley Colliery began soon afterwards. Stanton's continued to operate it until nationalisation in 1946, after which it was run by the National Coal Board until it closed in 1983, with some of the workforce transferring to nearby Shirebrook colliery from where the accessible remaining underground coal reserves were mined. The mine was partly demolished but during the demolition it was realised that the pit winding engines were the only pair of such engines left. The former mine is now a museum. The spoil heaps have been turned into a large nature reserve, complete with large ponds, cycle and walking tracks.

Pleasley, as a whole, spreads into two counties, with the old coal mine high above the old village centre and a series of very large old weaving mills below in the Vale being the historic main industries, together with farming.

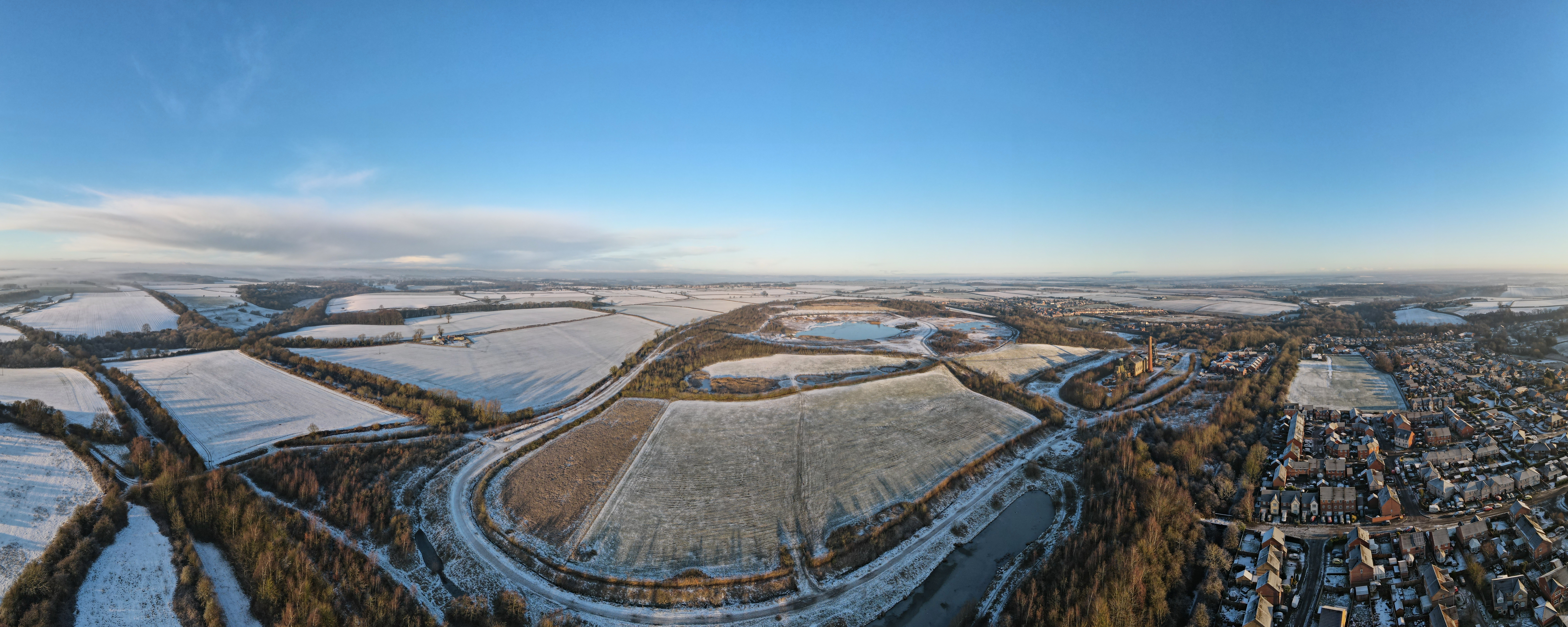
Pleasley Pit Country Park

Pleasley was served by two railway stations Pleasley East and Pleasley West. Both stations closed as well as the lines through them and the nearest active railway stations are now in Mansfield and Shirebrook.

== Education ==
Pleasley has two primary schools, one on the Nottinghamshire side of the village and one on the Derbyshire side.

=== Anthony Bek Primary School ===
Anthony Bek Primary School is located on the Derbyshire side of the village. First opened in 1899, the school is named after Antony Bek, a Bishop of Durham. The Bek family acquired half of the manor of Pleasley in 1280 and Anthony often returned during the crusades with Prince Edward. The school is situated on Rotherham Road, on the opposite side of the bypass to the village centre.

=== Farmilo Primary School ===
Farmilo Primary School is situated on the Nottinghamshire side of the village, close to the Radmanthwaite estate. Farmilo Primary School was originally situated on Chesterfield Road North where it was built in 1920, and is named for Councillor Farmilo who campaigned to have the school built. The school moved to its present location on Woburn Lane in the early 1970s. In 2017 the school took over the adjacent Sure Start centre and extended into it.

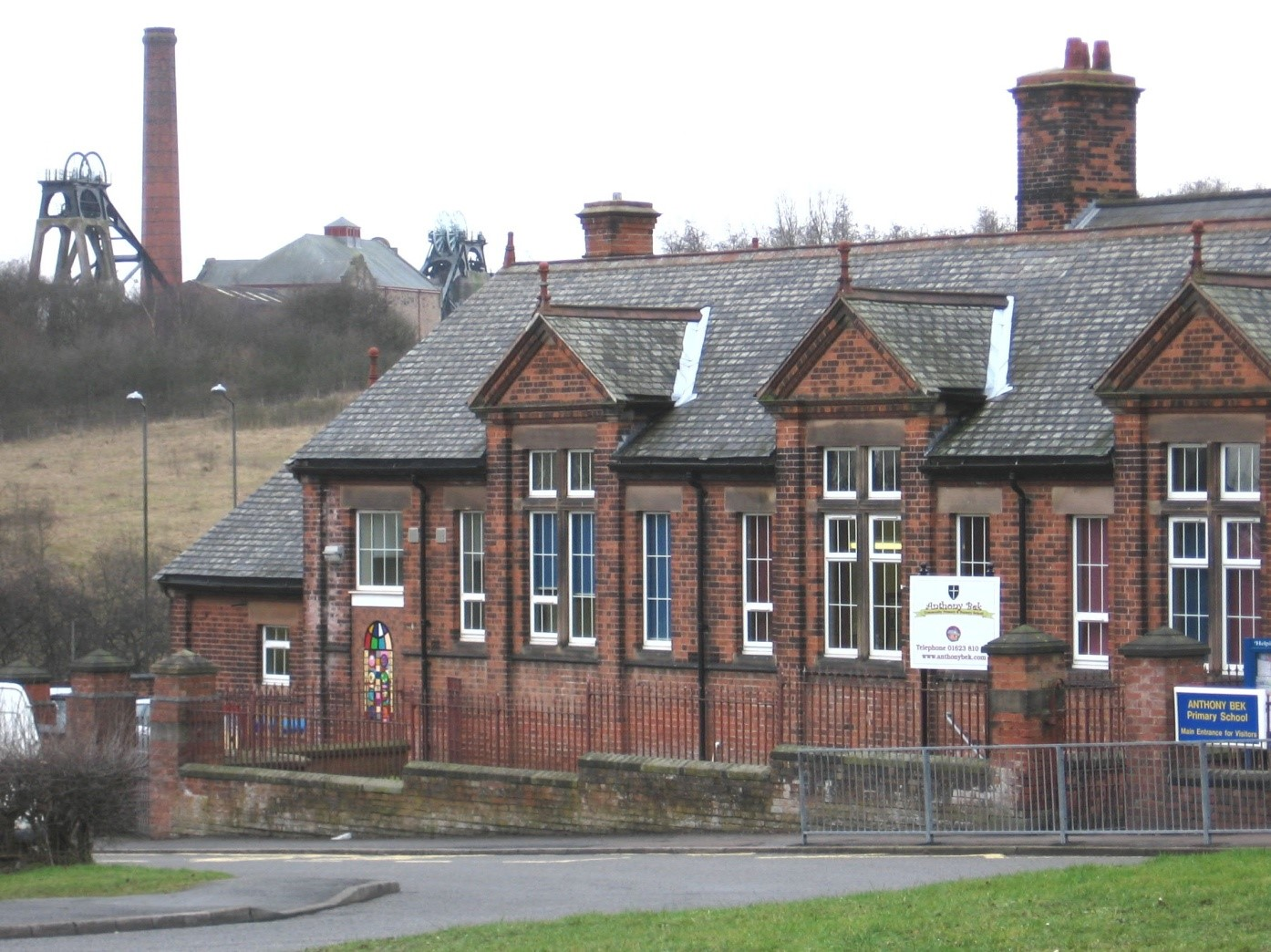
Anthony Bek Primary School

== The localities of Pleasley ==
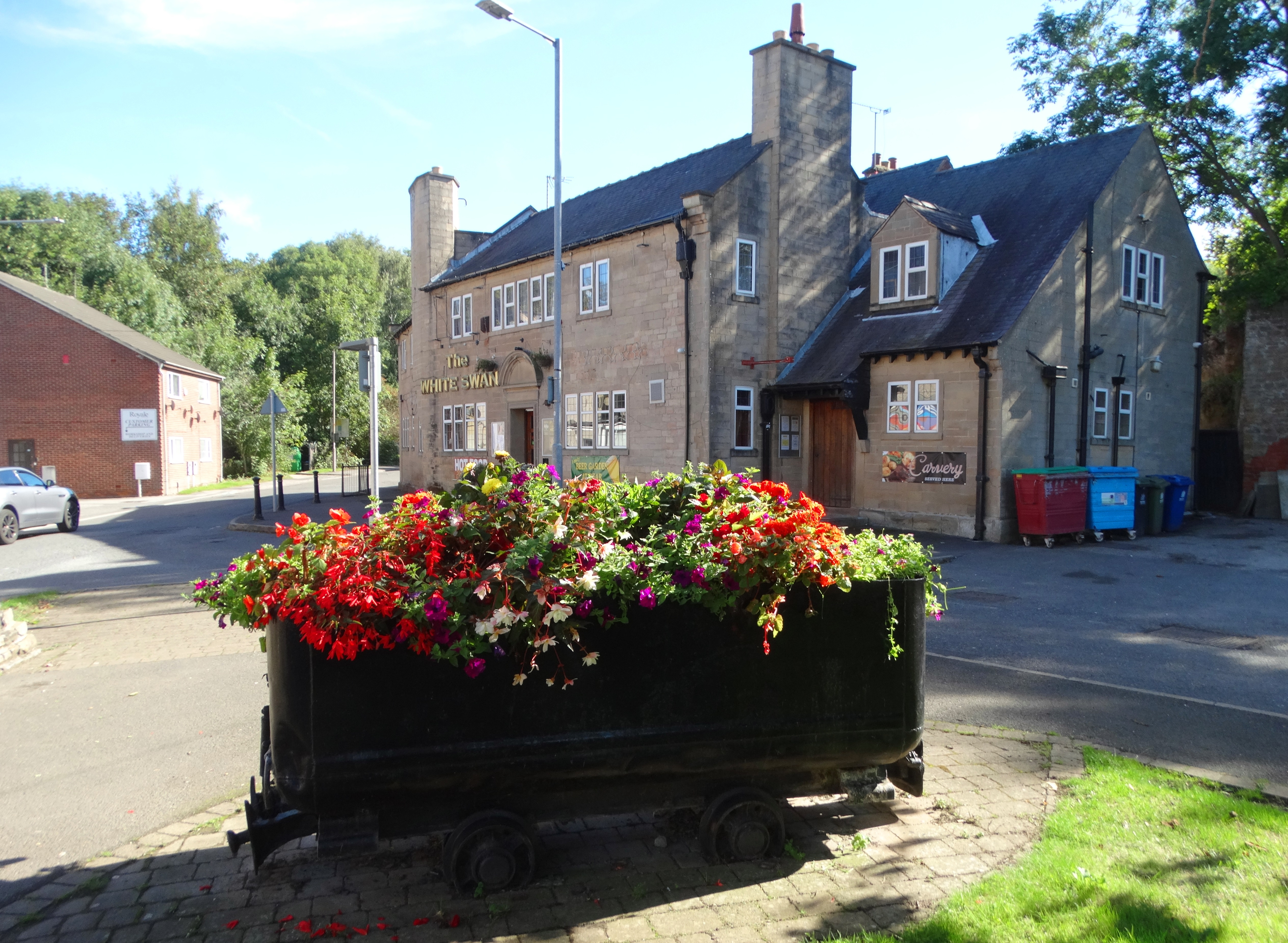
Meden Square in Pleasley village

The area of Pleasley itself consists of four distinct areas: Pleasley Village, Upper Pleasley, Pleasley Hill with the Radmanthwaite Estate and Pleasley Vale.

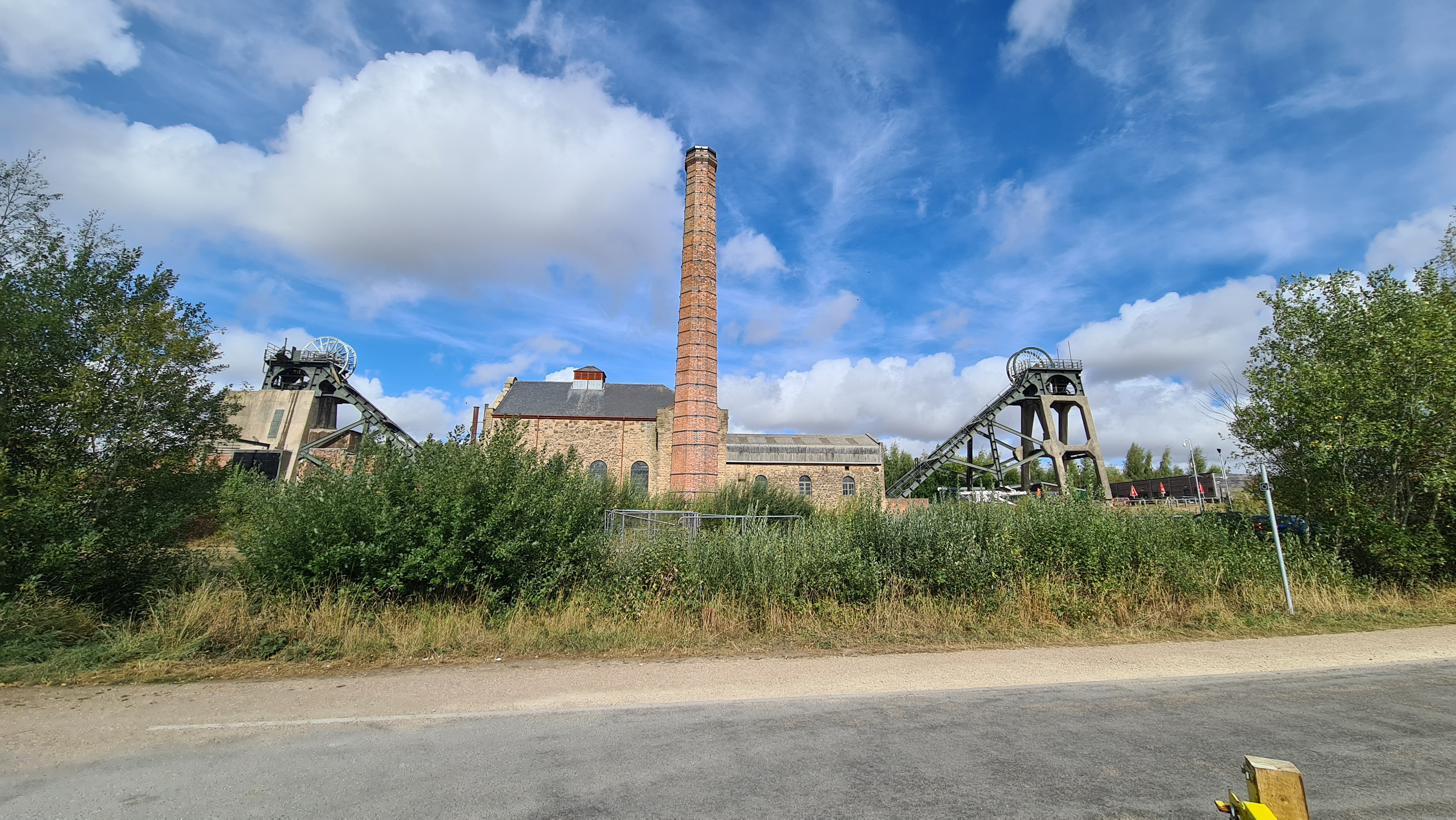
Pleasley Colliery in 2025, years after its renovation

Pleasley Village is the oldest part at the lowest point where the River Meden flows through the valley with a dam and mill pond in the centre of the village. Some original buildings remain, built from local sandstone, noticeably around the old mill site, and the two pubs.

=== Upper Pleasley ===
Upper Pleasley is situated at the southern end of the village, and is today the area around Terrace Lane. Terrace Lane was initially surrounded by fields, and eventually served as the back entrance to Pleasley Colliery, which is still visible today. Between 1875–1899, two rows of terraced houses were built on what is now Old Terrace. These were built for workers at the colliery. Private bungalows were built along Terrace Lane, and in the 1920s, more pit houses were built on New Terrace, and along the top of Terrace Lane.

The terraced houses on Old Terrace were demolished in the 1970s, and the land stood empty for 30 years. In the early 2000s, this land was built on and a new estate was built, with two new cul-de-sacs being built, and new houses being built along Old Terrace. In 2009, the older houses on New Terrace were demolished, and the remaining houses renovated. New homes were built in the place of the demolished houses, following the existing road layout.

=== Pleasley Hill ===
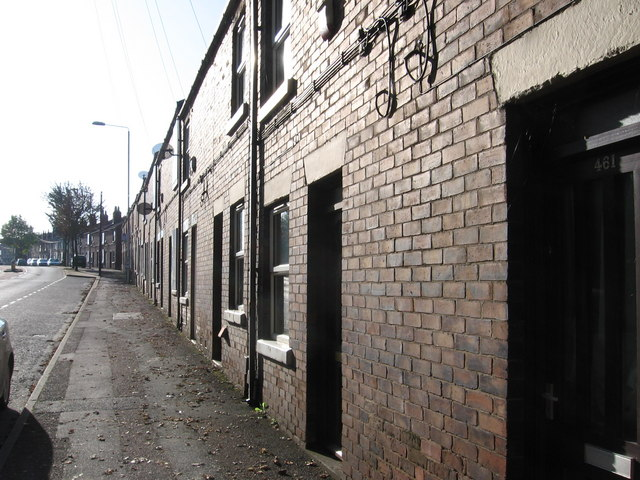
Former view up Pleasley Hill showing terraced housing, since demolished

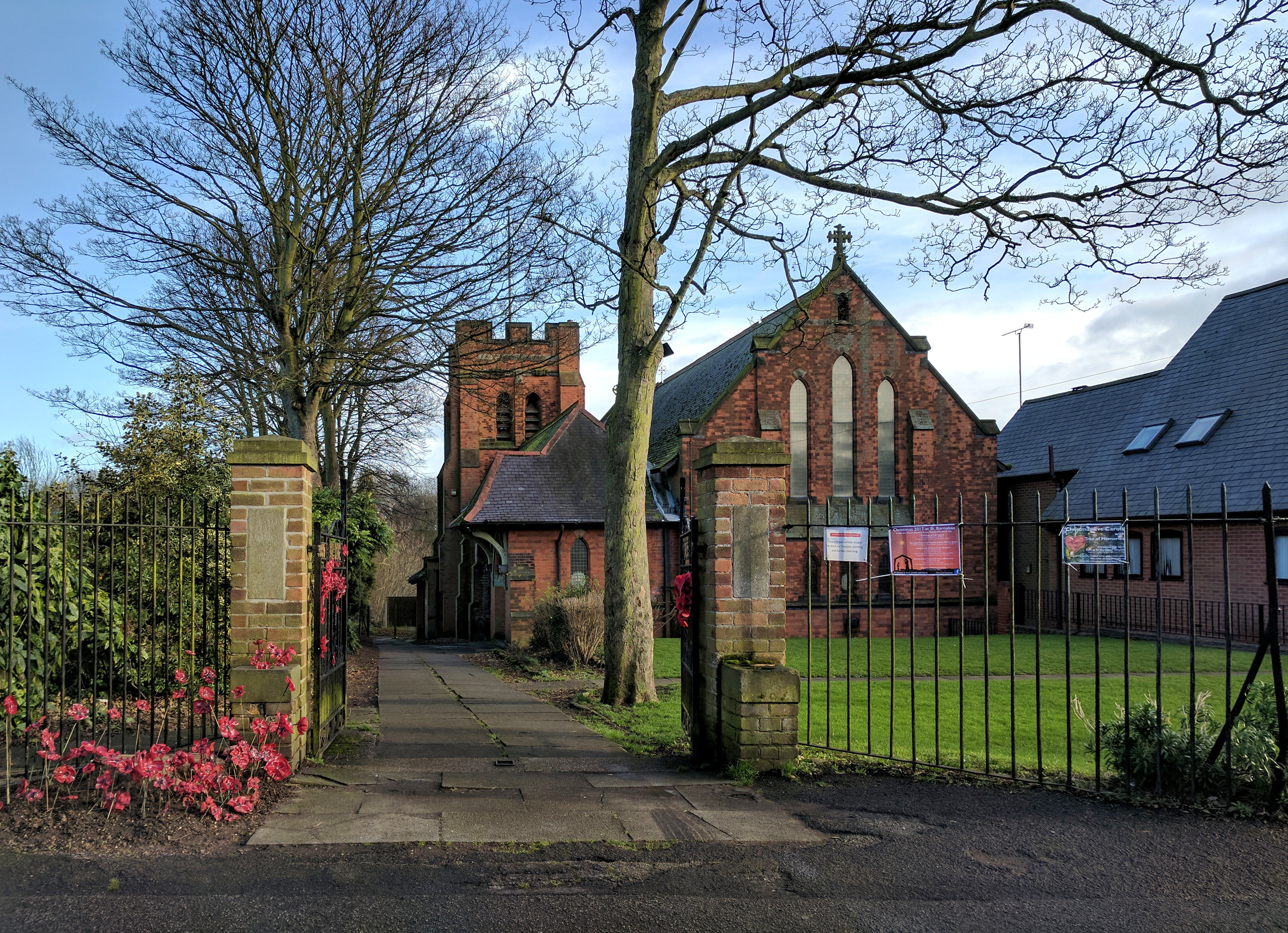
The church of St Barnabas

Pleasley Hill is an area in Mansfield, adjacent to Pleasley. It once consisted of rows of derelict terraced houses running along the main A617 road leading from Glapwell and the Pleasley By-pass towards Mansfield. It was the birthplace of the Pre-Raphaelite artist James Collinson, who brought Christina and Dante Gabriel Rossetti to visit in 1848–9.

These were the subject of lengthy debate in the area, and were demolished in 2013. In 2015, new houses were built on the land. A small amount of housing regeneration was created by seven derelict terraced homes on Hillmoor Street being sold by Mansfield District Council to a social enterprise group named TREES for just one pound. TREES (Training Regeneration Education Employment and Sustainability) – administered under Mansfield-based ex-servicemen's charity Joint Forces Alliance Ltd – helps veterans to refurbish and ultimately live in the homes. The area is strictly part of Mansfield and prior to Mansfield Mayor Tony Egginton's reorganisation of the Wards and ward boundaries in time for the 2011 elections, it had its own 'Pleasley Hill' ward but afterwards the name became Bull Farm and Pleasley Hill.

==== Pleasley By-pass Extension ====
The Pleasley area is situated around the main A617 road. The Pleasley Hill section is a steep, old winding single-carriageway which was scheduled for an improvement scheme designated Pleasley By-pass Extension, a Nottinghamshire County Council initiative intended to link the A617 Chesterfield Road North and MARR junction to the existing Pleasley By-pass, a long-established dual-carriageway created by Derbyshire County Council which terminates on the Nottinghamshire side at the base of Pleasley Hill.

The intended extension situated on the Nottinghamshire side has never been scheduled, and remains as a 'missing' section and bottleneck to the MARR route. Three proposals were mooted in 2004 with two alternate routes:

1. A single carriageway upgrade of the existing Pleasley Hill route
2. A single carriageway extension from the MARR junction at the top of Pleasley Hill routed through land running at the back of the old cemetery
3. A dual carriageway extension from the MARR junction at the top of Pleasley Hill routed through land running at the back of the old cemetery.

Nottinghamshire County Council summarised the scheme as:

Pleasley bypass extension has mixed impacts. It has clear economic benefits, and also will reduce accidents, pollution and noise along the existing route. However these are balanced by adverse effects along the new route, such as possible impact on wildlife and also a nearby primary school.

Mansfield District Council summarised the scheme as:

As with the Rainworth Bypass this scheme will provide considerable environmental benefits and will be an important component in improving links between the District and the M1, via junction 29. Depending on finance being made available it is anticipated that construction of this proposal will commence after 2000/2001.

Despite extensive planning and preparation, the road scheme was abandoned by Government's allocation of regional transport funding in 2009.

=== Pleasley Vale ===
Pleasley Vale is a deep, narrow valley, much of which is wooded, which has been formed by the River Meden cutting down through the underlying limestone escarpment. The Vale has been the location for industry since at least 1767, when two forges and a corn mill are known to have been operating, powered by the river. The forges were run by George Sitwell, and were called Nether and Upper forge. The engineered river channel made it a good site for further development, and a consortium of businessmen from Nottingham and drapers from Mansfield leased the vale and Pleasley Park in 1782, to construct water-powered cotton mills. The Upper Mill was built first, on the site of the previous corn mill, and was operational by 1785. The Lower Mill was completed seven years later at a cost of £1,190, and was much bigger. A manager's house and a row of ten houses for the workers was also completed in 1792. The mills supplied cotton to the expanding East Midland hosiery industry. One of the original three businessmen was Henry Hollins, and by the early 18th century, the mills were run by William Hollins and Co. They were the first and one of the most successful cotton producers in the East Midlands.

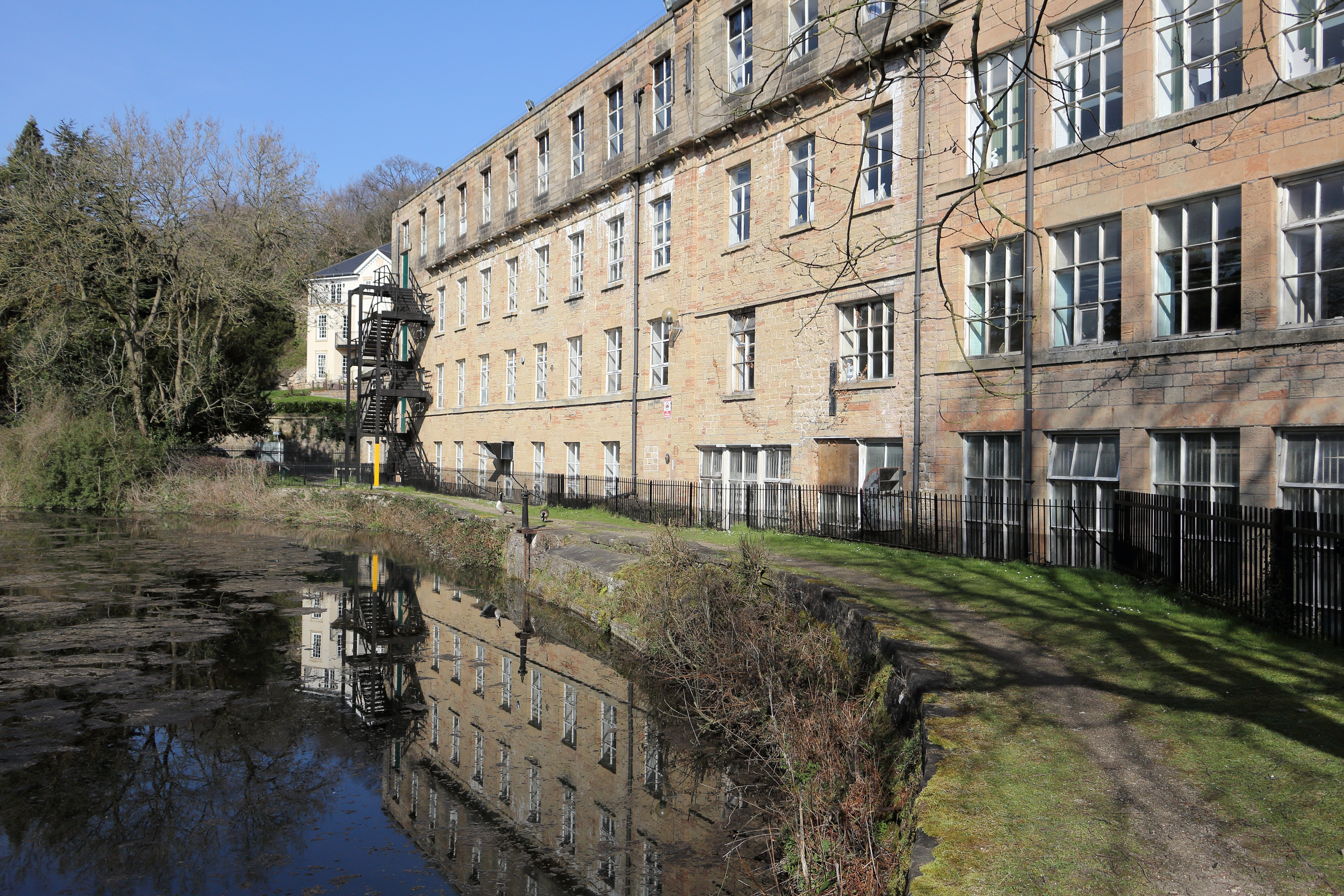
One of the mills at Pleasley Vale, with the mill pond in the foreground

The Hollins family managed the mills for many years, but from the 1830s were joined by the Pagets, who introduced steam power to the mills. Fire destroyed the Upper Mill on 25 December 1840, but it was rebuilt by 1844. The Lower Mill also burnt down, and was replaced in 1847. Newer equipment fitted as part of the rebuilding enabled the mills to stay competitive. William Hollins lived at Pleasley Vale, and oversaw the expansion of the community, with the construction of more houses for the workers, the provision of public facilities including a school, wash house, and a cooperative society, and attention to leisure activities by the establishing of a Mechanics Institute, a library and a cricket club. A company farm was also established. St Chad's Chapel and the vicarage were commissioned by Charles Paget in 1876. The Chapel was opened in 1881, but was reputedly built in 1861 at Stuffynwood, Derbyshire, and later moved to its present site. It has a small bell turret at its western end, and a number of its features mimic thirteenth and fourteenth century styles. Internally, there is a brass memorial to Paget and his wife Helen Elizabeth.

From the 1890s, the mills produced Viyella, a mixture of cotton with Merino wool, which produces a soft fabric. A third mill (now called Mill 2) was built between the upper and lower mills in 1913. It was originally built as a combing shed, where the cotton fibres were straightened and aligned prior to the production of fabric, but became a mill in 1952 following the addition of a further two floors to the main building, and a three-storey extension on the side. The mills continued to flourish, employing 980 workers at the site in 1934. Transport of raw materials and finished product was provided by the Midland Railway, who opened their Tibshelf and Pleasley branch in 1883, primarily to serve Pleasley Colliery, which began production in 1878. The branch connected with other lines at Mansfield Woodhouse in the east and Alfreton in the west. Sidings and a warehouse were built below the lower mill. By 1938, the upper sidings had been built, which provided direct access to the Upper Mill and the combing shed. The railway and its sidings had both been dismantled by 1967.

==== Regeneration ====
The first workers houses were demolished in 1961, to be followed by the school, the baths and the Mechanics Institute. By 1987, production had moved abroad, and the mills closed.

Bolsover District Council sought to buy the mill buildings in 1992, using compulsory purchase powers. They were to be converted for use as offices and by light industry. The Council obtained them for just £1.00, and secured over £1 million in funding for the first phase of restoration. The initial building tackled was the latest to be built, and Mill 2 provided 160,385 square feet (14,900 m^{2}) of accommodation when it was completed in 1994. Phase 2 consisted of Mill 1 and the North Wing, which provided a further 130,000 square feet (12,000 m^{2}) and was completed in 1997. Stage 3 was the refurbishment of Mill 3, which provided 408,646 square feet (37,964 m^{2}) of space. By 1998, over £4 million had been spent of the work, and the mill buildings provided accommodation for 45 businesses employing 244 people.

On 13 October 2025, the district council gave Mill 1 tenants immediate notice to cease trading and leave the building due to the dangerous condition of the structure, as advised by Derbyshire Building Control Partnership. Following analysis of the report and further inspections by structural engineers, a week later some tenants were allowed to return as the deterioration was found to be less-extensive than at first suspected.

== Gallery ==
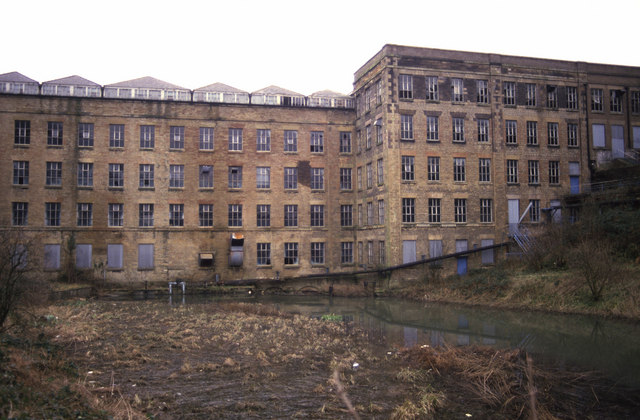

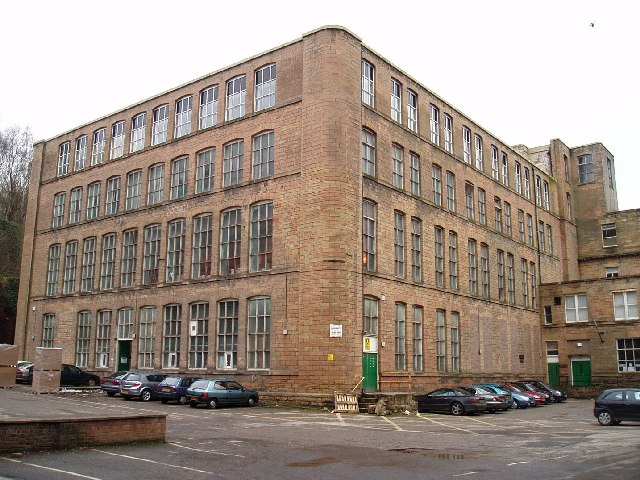

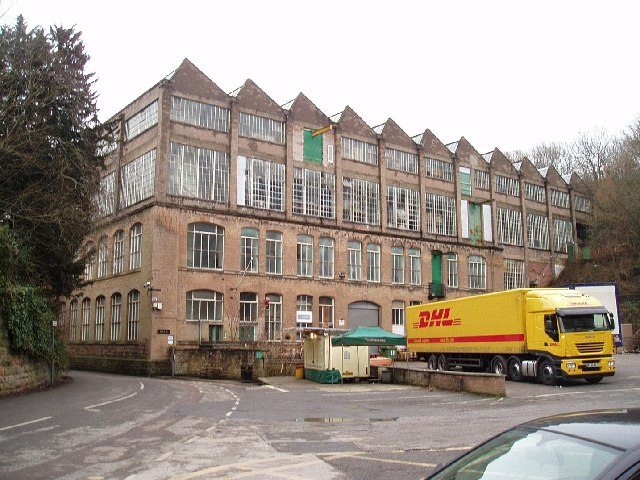

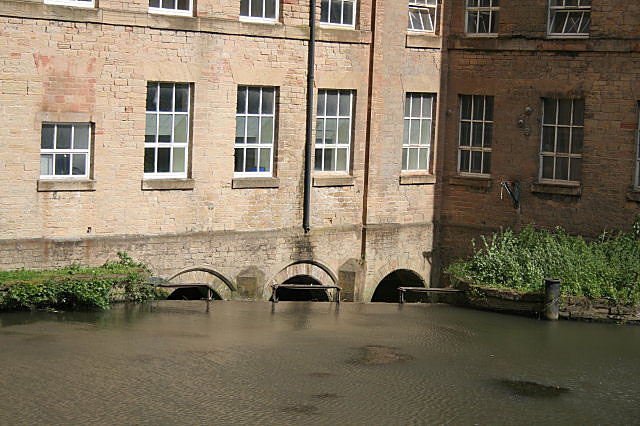

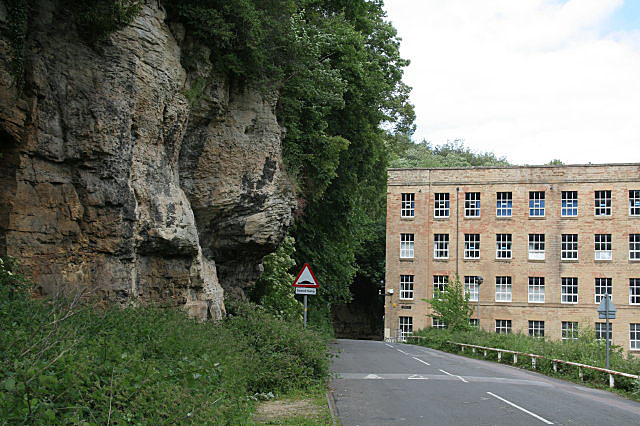

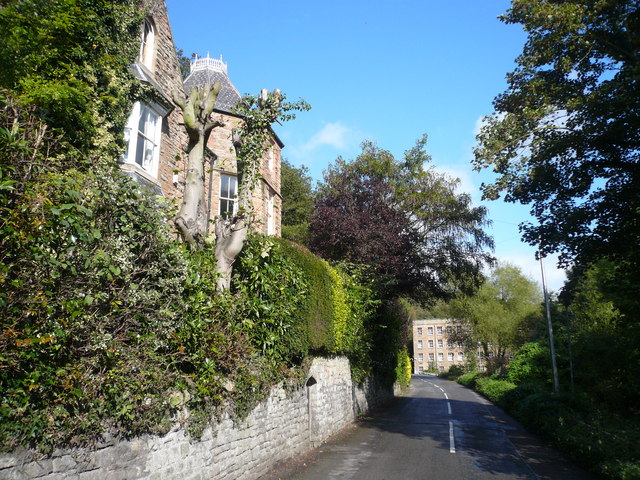

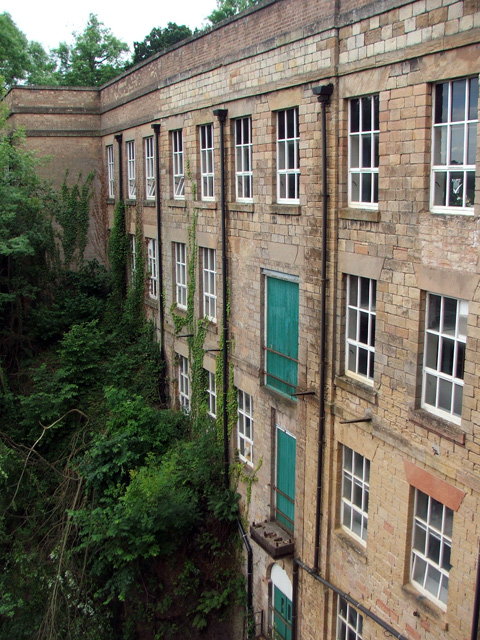

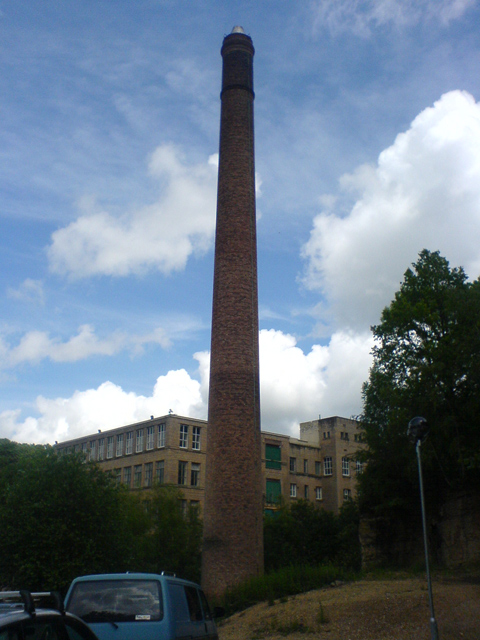

== See also ==
- Listed buildings in Pleasley
