= Doe Hill railway station =

Disused railway station in Stonebroom, Derbyshire

Doe Hill
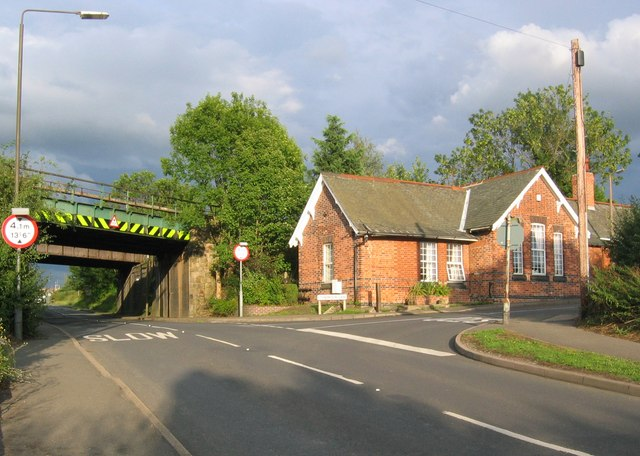
- The station building in 2006

General information
- Location: Stonebroom, Derbyshire; England
- Coordinates: 53.1364°N 1.3751°W
- Grid reference: SK419601
- Platforms: 2

Other information
- Status: Disused

History
- Original company: Midland Railway
- Pre-grouping: Midland Railway
- Post-grouping: London, Midland and Scottish Railway; British Railways (London Midland Region)

Key dates
- 1 May 1862: Opened
- 12 September 1960: Closed
Location

Doe Hill railway station served the village of Stonebroom, Derbyshire, England, from 1862 to 1960 on the Erewash Valley Line.

== History ==
The station was opened on 1 May 1862 by the Midland Railway. It closed on 12 September 1960. The station building still survives.

On 12 February 1929, a head-on collision took place at the station. An express passenger train, hauled by Ex-LNWR Claughton Class 4-6-0 No. 5977, and a freight train, being hauled by LMS Fowler 4F 0-6-0 No. 4491, collided due to a signalman’s error. 2 people were killed. 5977 was subsequently withdrawn from service 2 months after the accident, becoming the first Claughton to be scrapped.

Preceding station	Historical railways	Following station
Alfreton; Line open, station open	Midland Railway; Erewash Valley Line	Westhouses and Blackwell; Line open, station closed
