= Rowthorn and Hardwick railway station =

Former railway station in Derbyshire, England

Rowthorn and Hardwick
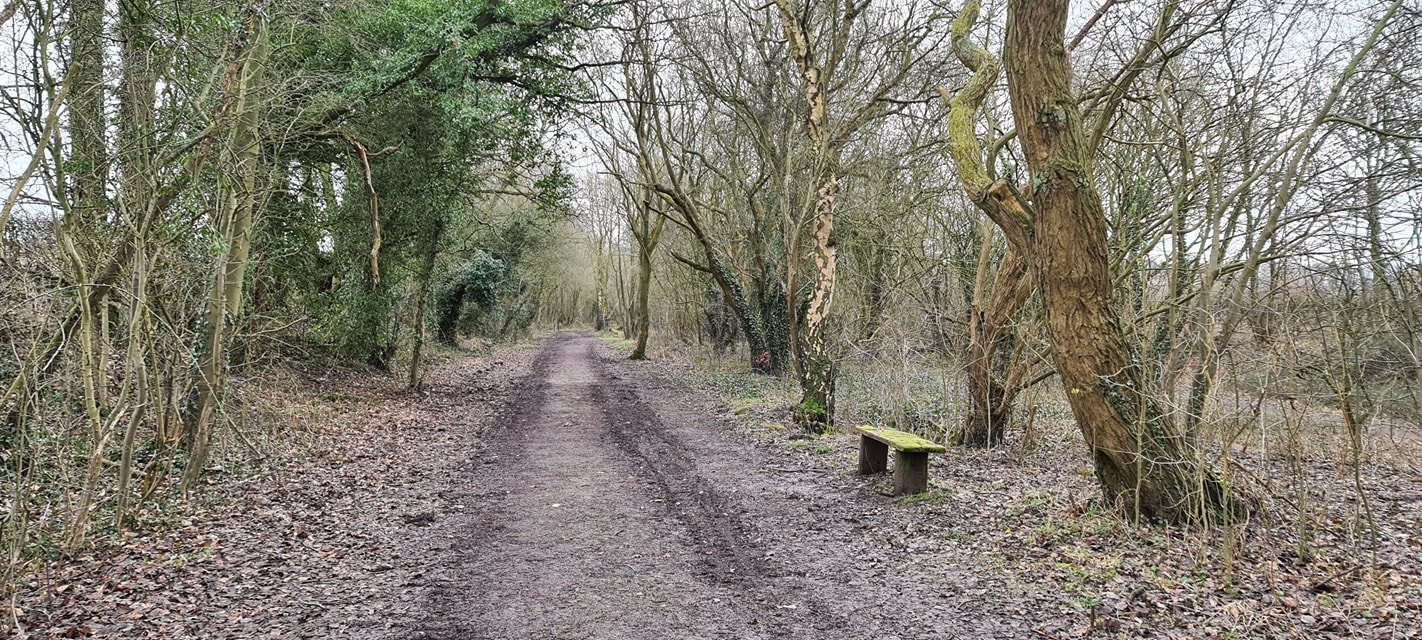

General information
- Location: Rowthorn, Bolsover; England
- Coordinates: 53°10′37.12″N 1°17′18.87″W
- Grid reference: SK 475 646
- Platforms: 1

Other information
- Status: Disused

History
- Original company: Midland Railway
- Post-grouping: LMSR

Key dates
- 1 September 1890: Opened
- 28 July 1930: Closed completely
Location

Rowthorn and Hardwick is a former railway station in Rowthorn (often written "Rowthorne"), near Glapwell, Derbyshire, England.

== Context ==
The station was built by the Midland Railway on the circuitous Barrow Hill to Pleasley West line known as the Doe Lea Branch, because it ran for much of its length along the valley of the River Doe Lea.

== History ==
The line was opened without ceremony on 1 September 1890. It initially provided a service of three trains each way between Mansfield and Chesterfield, taking about an hour from end to end.

The line was single track between Seymour Junction and Pleasley West. Accordingly, the station had a single platform.

Normal passenger traffic along the Doe Lea Branch dwindled over the years and finally ceased on 28 July 1930. Glapwell Colliery and others in the Doe Lea Valley were still going strong at this time, but all their coal went out northwards, so very little traffic passed through the station and the steep line through Rowthorn Tunnel. The opportunity was therefore taken to abandon the line from just south of Glapwell station to Pleasley Colliery West Junction a short distance South of Pleasley West. That meant the abandonment of Glapwell station itself, Rowthorn Tunnel and Rowthorn and Hardwick station.

Rowthorn Tunnel was used for growing mushrooms then for storing ammunition during the Second World War. It is now filled in.

== Modern times ==
Parts of the trackbed and those of neighbouring lines have been turned into public footpaths and bridleways.

Fragments of the long-demolished station can still be found.

Preceding station	Disused railways	Following station
Glapwell; Line and station closed	Midland Railway; Doe Lea Branch	Pleasley West; Line and station closed
