= Rowthorn Tunnel =

Railway tunnel in Derbyshire, England

Coordinates: 53°11′7.23″N 1°17′35.75″W

Rowthorn Tunnel is a former railway tunnel between Glapwell and Rowthorn and Hardwick stations southeast of Chesterfield, Derbyshire, England. Some sources refer to the tunnel as "Rowthorne".

== Context ==
The tunnel was built by the Midland Railway on the circuitous Barrow Hill to Pleasley West line known as "The Doe Lea Branch", because it ran for much of its length along the valley of the River Doe Lea.

== Structure ==
The tunnel was single track and 929 yards (849 m) long. The line from the north approached on a gradient of 1 in 50 which continued through the tunnel, making it very difficult to work coal trains southwards.

== History ==
The line was opened without ceremony on 1 September 1890. It initially provided a service of three trains each way between Mansfield and Chesterfield, taking about an hour from end to end.

Normal passenger traffic along the branch dwindled over the years and finally ceased on 28 July 1930. Glapwell Colliery, to the north of the tunnel was still going strong at this time. As its sidings left the passenger line to the north of Glapwell station and all coal went out northwards, Glapwell station was abandoned along with the track through the tunnel almost to Pleasley Colliery West Junction which was a short distance south of Pleasley West.

After closure the tunnel found two new uses, first as a mushroom farm then, during the Second World War, as an ammunition store. It has since been filled in.

== Sources ==
- Anderson, Paul; Cupit, Jack (2000). An Illustrated History of Mansfield's Railways. Clophill: Irwell Press. ISBN 978-1-903266-15-1.
- Hurst, Geoffrey (1987). The Midland Railway Around Nottinghamshire, Volume 1. Worksop: Milepost Publications. ISBN 978-0-947796-05-1.
- Midland Railway System Maps (The Distance Diagrams), volume 2 – Leeds to Leicester and branches; Derby to Manchester and branches; Cheshire Lines (1909–1923 ed.). Teignmouth: Peter Kay. 1998. ISBN 978-1-899890-17-0.
- "An Abandoned Midland Branch". Notes and News. The Railway Magazine. Vol. 87. London: Tothill Press Limited. May 1941. p. 227. ISSN 0033-8923.
