= Doe Lea branch line =

The Doe Lea branch is a mothballed railway line in Derbyshire, England. It connected the Derbyshire towns of Chesterfield, Staveley and Bolsover to Mansfield Woodhouse and Mansfield. It also had a branch line to Staveley, from Creswell via Clowne.

The single track line followed the valley of the River Doe Lea for much of its route.

== Construction ==
The branch was constructed from north to south in three stages over 27 years.

- The Midland Railway Additional Powers Act of 21 July 1863 authorised the company to build a line from a junction near Seymour Colliery, near Staveley, approximately 2 miles (3.2 km) to Bolsover Woodhouse in the Doe Lea Valley.
  - The junction near Seymour became known as Seymour Junction.
  - This line opened for traffic on 1 May 1866. The only apparent source of this traffic is Markham No.1 Colliery, evidence confirming this has yet to be found.
- The Midland Railway Additional Powers Act of 28 July 1873 authorised the company to build the "Doe Lea Extension" 4.2 miles (6.8 km) southwards to the west of the Doe Lea to the parish of Ault Hucknall, terminating "in a field called Horse Close".
  - Within eighteen months the company changed its mind and wished to build this extension slightly longer and to the east of the river. This alteration was authorised by the Midland Railway Additional Powers Act of 29 June 1875, which included the requirement that the company restore for cultivation any land abandoned by the deviation.
  - Buying the necessary land was so time-consuming the company had to seek an extension, which was granted by the Midland Railway Additional Powers Act of 17 July 1878.
  - The Doe Lea Extension Deviation was opened to Glapwell on 1 September 1886 (thirteen years after authorisation) for goods traffic and workmen's trains.
  - Glapwell colliery opened in 1882 and progress was made towards opening Bolsover colliery, where sinking would eventually begin in 1890; both of these would give a return on the investment.
  - Workmen's services were provided calling at all collieries between Staveley and Glapwell.
- The Midland Railway Additional Powers Act of 16 July 1883 authorised the company to
  - build the "Doe Lea and Teversall Junction Railway" from the Doe Lea Extension Deviation (in construction) to a junction which became known as Pleasley Colliery West Junction a short distance south of the future Pleasley West station, and
  - bring the whole route up to passenger-carrying standards.
- The first two sections had been easy to build along the gently sloping bottom of the Doe Lea Valley, the only section with any gradient being the approach to Glapwell from the north. This third and final section was a very different matter, it involved boring the only tunnel on the whole route and the only significant gradients, notably long sections at 1 in 50. Time and costs overran significantly with contractors experiencing landslips and wet ground which involved among other things having to extend Rowthorn Tunnel beyond original estimates.
- The route as a whole was opened to passenger traffic on 1 September 1890.
- Later additions occurred with the opening of Bolsover Collieries, Ramcroft Colliery during WW1, Markham No.2 Colliery, Byron Bricks siding and Coalite at Bolsover.

== Passenger services ==
Initially there were only three stations on the branch - Bolsover (later renamed Bolsover Castle), Palterton and Sutton and Rowthorn and Hardwick. Bolsover station was down a long hill from Bolsover, Palterton and Sutton was midway between both small villages, but near neither, and Rowthorn remains a small village to this day, though it has acquired an "e" as Rowthorne. Glapwell colliery had brought people to live and work, but was not provided with a station other than a collier's platform at the pit. As a result of local campaigning a station was built at Glapwell and opened on 1 September 1892.

The initial service was three trains each weekday calling at all stations between Mansfield and Barrow Hill (then called Staveley"), one of which went through via Whittington to Chesterfield, with an extra Mansfield to Barrow Hill and return on Saturdays. there never was a Sunday service on the branch. This sinuous journey took about an hour from end to end.

By 1922 little had changed to timing or pattern, except there were now two extra trains on Saturdays and most of the trains ran through to Chesterfield.

In 1930, the final year of passenger services, there were still three a day, each way, with an extra on Saturdays but only one Saturday train ran to and from Chesterfield.

The service was withdrawn on 28 July 1930.

Although the local service was withdrawn, Bolsover station proved to be a remarkable survivor, bringing passenger trains to part of the branch for a further 50 years.

An unadvertised service continued to call until 14 August 1931 and pre-war excursions continued until at least 27 July 1939. Records show that a half-day excursion service called at Bolsover on 26 July 1949 on its way to Bridlington and Scarborough. The last steam train to use the line was an enthusiasts' special on 16 October 1965. This train also traversed the Clowne Branch.

Occasional specials continued to call at the station. One such was run to Chesterfield in connection with the Queen's Jubilee celebrations in Queen's Park, Chesterfield on 28 July 1977. This had been on the initiative of the headmaster of Bolsover Church of England Junior School as there were insufficient buses to take all the children to the event. Thereafter, there were yearly August excursions from 1978 until 1981 organised by Bolsover Miners' Welfare when trains of at least nine coaches ran to Scarborough. Another source claims that the last charter from Bolsover Castle was a nine-coach train to London Liverpool Street via Chesterfield on 15 November 1980 organised by Bolsover Secondary School PTA.

== Run down ==
The decline of the branch was a case of last in - first out.

When the line closed to local passenger traffic in 1930 Glapwell Colliery was still going strong. As its sidings left the passenger line north of Glapwell station and all coal went out northwards, the station was abandoned along with the track southwards through Rowthorn Tunnel almost to Pleasley Colliery West Junction, leaving a short length there as a siding. The abandoned section had been difficult and expensive to work and was simply redundant.

After closure the tunnel found two new uses, first as a mushroom farm then, during WW2, as an ammunition store. It has since been filled in.

This left the earliest two sections – the Doe Lea line and the Doe Lea extension deviation – running as a dead-end branch from Seymour Junction to Glapwell Colliery. Unofficially at least, the branch became called the Glapwell Branch for a generation of railwaymen, as for the next 44 years that was its terminus. Until the advent of British Rail Class 20 diesels in the early 1960s the characteristic motive power along the branch were the ubiquitous Midland 3F and LMS 4F 0-6-0s hauling the dominant traffic – coal. Coal from Glapwell, Ramcroft, Bolsover and Markham, with a small amount of traffic from Coalite and a smaller amount from Byron Bricks.

The line's leisurely routine was interrupted for a few days in August 1952 when the ex-LD&ECR Doe Lea Viaduct, which straddled the Doe Lea Branch a short distance south of Bolsover Castle station, was demolished by the army using explosives. This was filmed and the film later used in a commercial war film, becoming a bridge in war torn France.

Ramcroft Colliery closed in 1966 and Glapwell followed in 1974, rendering the line south of Bolsover redundant, though it was not lifted until 1978.

Bolsover and Markham Collieries closed in the 1990s and Coalite finally went into receivership in 2004, but it had not provided much traffic for some time.

This left the remaining stub from Seymour Junction to Bolsover Castle station (only slightly longer than the original 1866 Doe Lea line to Bolsover Woodhouse) intact but redundant.

By now, unofficially at least, the branch became called the Bolsover Branch. At 2011, apart from predation by thieves and vandals, it was intact, but overgrown.

== Trackbed uses ==
The branch between Bolsover Castle and the bottom of Rylah Hill between Palterton and M1 J29 is now a public bridleway known as The Stockley Trail.

Glapwell Colliery and all associated tracks have been buried under landscaping of the former pit tip.

Parts of the trackbed in the vicinity of Pleasley West and those of neighbouring lines have been turned into public footpaths and bridleways.

== Possible future ==
The line from Foxlow Junction through Hall Lane Junction to Seymour Junction and Oxcroft Disposal Point off the Clowne Branch has been mothballed as there remains the possibility of opencasting in the area. For example, in 2005 UK Coal (now Coalfield Resources), expressed an interest in extracting c530,000 tons near Mastin Moor.

The Doe Lea line south from Seymour Junction to Bolsover has been mothballed as it runs through the new Markham Vale Enterprise Zone at M1 Junction 29A. It was originally hoped that someone would invest in this infrastructure to create road-rail interchange facilities, however several studies have appraised the cost benefit of this link, and it seems unlikely to progress. A more likely alternative seems to be the extension of the Stockley Trail Greenway along the original track bed, and through the redeveloped Coalite site, connecting into the Markham Vale Scheme and affording a near direct link to the Trans Pennine Trail through Poolsbrook Country Park

The Clowne Branch was purchased in 2016 by Derbyshire County Council and is planned to be developed into a full Greenway all the way to the east and to provide a sustainable transport link with Creswell Rail Station. The greenway has been officially opened as of 2018 and is open to as far as the former junction between the Clowne and Doe Lea Branch. The section towards Staveley and Bolsover is not accessible and there is no plans to open a greenway through to Bolsover via Staveley.
