= Westhouses and Blackwell railway station =

Former railway station in Derbyshire, England

Westhouses and Blackwell
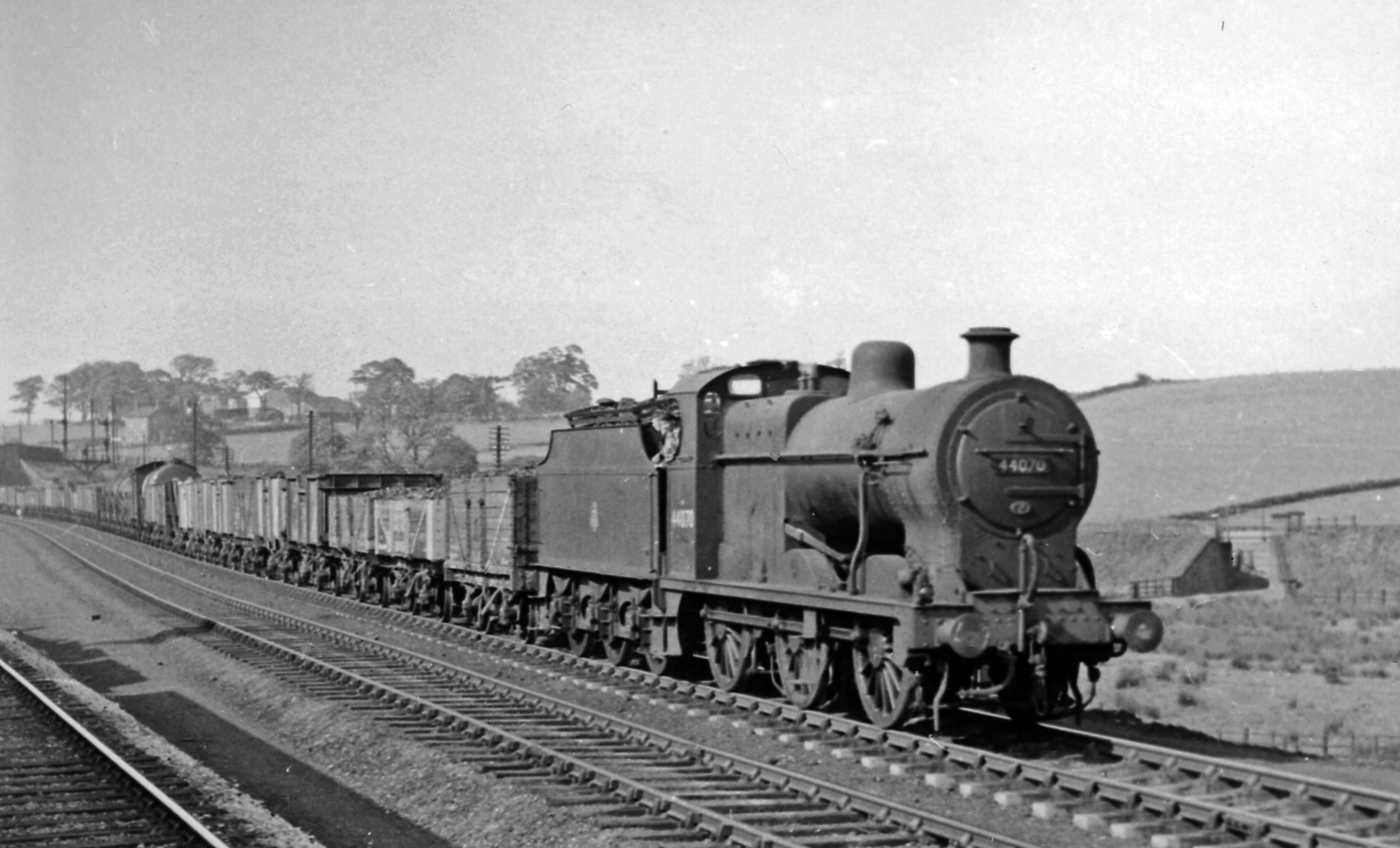
- A freight train at the station in 1957

General information
- Location: Westhouses, Derbyshire, England; England
- Coordinates: 53.117143°N 1.368375°W
- Platforms: 2

Other information
- Status: Disused

History
- Original company: Midland Railway
- Post-grouping: LMSR

Key dates
- 17 October 1881: Opened
- 1933: Pleasley branch line closed to passengers
- 2 January 1967: Station closed
Location

Westhouses and Blackwell railway station is a former railway station in Westhouses, and Blackwell, Derbyshire on the Derbyshire border west of Mansfield. The line served as a junction for both the modern-day Erewash Valley Line and a branch line to Pleasley West.

== History ==
Not much is recorded about the station other than it was opened in 1881. The station building was of typical Midland Railway build and closed to passenger services to Pleasley in 1930. The station closed on 2 January 1967, and nothing remains of the station. The line remains open to services on the Erewash Valley Line. The branch to Pleasley is now the Silverhill Trail.

Preceding station	Disused railways	Following station
Alfreton	Erewash Valley Line; Midland Railway	Doe Hill
Tibshelf & Newton	Pleasley Branch; Midland Railway	Alfreton
