= Meco-Moore Cutter Loader =

The Meco-Moore cutter loader was an early twentieth-century British mining machine. It was invented by Mr M. Moore, and developed by the Mining Engineering Company (MECO) of Worcester. It was a heavy machine (120 hp / 89.5 kW) and was first used in a coal mine in Lancashire, England 1934. The design was such that it worked along the coal seam (along a "longwall panel") The machine's cutter bars, the "jibs" as they were called, (two in the original model and three in a later versions) were designed to both shear and undercut the coal seam. The cut coal was cut onto the connected conveyor belt system which took it towards the mine's entrance. It was, or was among, the first such machines to do both cutting and loading at the same time. The machine increased both productivity and safety.

== See also ==
- Anderton Shearer Loader
- Huwood Power Loader
