= Listed buildings in Pleasley =

Pleasley is a civil parish in the Bolsover District of Derbyshire, England. The parish contains ten listed buildings that are recorded in the National Heritage List for England. Of these, one is listed at Grade II*, the middle of the three grades, and the others are at Grade II, the lowest grade. The parish contains the village of Pleasley and the surrounding area. The listed buildings consist of a church, a medieval cross base, a dam and sluices on the River Meden and a bridge crossing it, a farmhouse, a pair of lodges, buildings remaining from a closed colliery, a village hall, and a war memorial.

== Key ==
Grade	Criteria
II*	Particularly important buildings of more than special interest
II	Buildings of national importance and special interest

== Buildings ==
Name and location	Photograph	Date	Notes	Grade
St Michael's Church; 53.17589°N 1.24690°W		12th century	The church, which dates mainly from the 13th century, has been altered, extended, and restored during the centuries. It is built in sandstone with Welsh slate roofs, and consists of a nave with a south porch, a chancel with a north vestry, and a west tower. The tower has a moulded plinth, two unequal stages, a moulded string course, and diagonal buttresses. On the west front is a blocked doorway and a three-light window, both with four-centred arches, and the bell openings have two cusped lights. At the top are two gargoyles, an embattled parapet, and corner crocketed pinnacles. Inside the church is a 12th-century chancel arch.	II*
Pleasley Cross; 53.17310°N 1.24776°W		14th century (probable)	The cross base is in the middle of a road junction, and is in sandstone. It consists of a plinth of three steps, on which is a smaller plinth, and the square base of the cross.	II
Dam and sluices 53.17271°N 1.24539°W		Late 18th century	The dam and sluices on the River Meden are in stone. The dam is about 3 metres (9.8 ft) thick and 20 metres (66 ft) wide, with a central cutwater flanked by single elliptical-arched sluices, and is closed on the water side by vertical wooden sluice gates and operating gear. On each side it is flanked by walls, and to the east is a stepped spillway.	II
Pleasley Bridge; 53.17293°N 1.24530°W		c. 1800	The bridge carries Chesterfield Road over the River Meden, and is in stone. On the south side are two round arches with [[keystone)|keystones]] and a smaller round arch to the east, with an impost band and a coped parapet wall. The north side has two plain round arches, and to the west is a smaller round arch. At the ends are piers with concave-sided square domed caps.	II
Hall Farmhouse; 53.19132°N 1.26301°W		Early 19th century	The farmhouse, which was later extended, is in sandstone with quoins, and a Welsh slate roof with stone coped gables and plain kneelers. There are two storeys and an attic, and a front of three bays, the left bay lower and later. In the middle bay is a round-arched doorway with a fanlight, impost blocks and a keystone, and above it is a round-arched window with impost blocks and a keystone containing a sash window with Gothic glazing. In both floors of the right bay are Venetian windows, and in the left bay the windows are sashes.	II
East Lodge, Pleasley Vale; 53.18004°N 1.22968°W		Mid 19th century	The lodge, which is in Tudor style, is in sandstone on a plinth, with a moulded sill band, and a Welsh slate roof with coped gables, some with fretted bargeboards and pendants. There is a single storey and an attic, and an irregular plan. On the corner is a triangular porch with a four-centred arched opening and a pyramidal roof. The windows on the front are sashes and a gabled dormer, and on the left return is a canted bay window.	II
West Lodge, Pleasley Vale; 53.17996°N 1.23001°W		Mid 19th century	The lodge, which is in Tudor style, is in sandstone on a plinth, with a moulded sill band, a tile roof, and gables with fretted bargeboards and pendants. There is a single storey and an attic, an irregular plan, and a north front of two bays. In the centre is a gabled porch with a trefoiled-arched entrance and inner doorway. To its left is a canted bay window, to its right is a window with a chamfered surround and a hood mould, and above are two gabled dormers with moulded hood moulds, bargeboards and pendants.	II
Engine house, chimney and headstocks, Pleasley Colliery; 53.17409°N 1.25541°W		1873	The engine room for the former colliery is in sandstone and red brick with a slate roof, hipped at one end, and with a coped gable and kneelers at the other end. There is a T-shaped plan, a louvred lantern on the roof, four round-arched casement windows on each side, and a brick chimney attached to the south. The two headstocks were built in 1898 and 1904, and are in steel on a concrete base.	II
Pleasley Village Hall; 53.17237°N 1.24859°W		1905–06	Also known as The Verney Institute, the hall is in roughcast brick on a stone plinth, with a hipped pantile roof, and is in Arts and Crafts style. On the front are projecting wings with a verandah between, above which is a dormer containing a three-light window and a clock face, and over this is a bellcote with a lead pyramidal roof. The wings contain casement windows, and at the rear are buttresses between three gabled dormers.	II
War Memorial; 53.17410°N 1.25031°W		c. 1918	The war memorial is in stone, and has a rectangular plan. There is a stepped plinth and a moulded base, on which is a plain rectangular block, stepped at the top. On the front are inscriptions relating to both World Wars, and above them is a carved wreath.	II
