= Pleasley Colliery =

Former coal mine in Derbyshire

Coordinates: 53.1742°N 1.2550°W

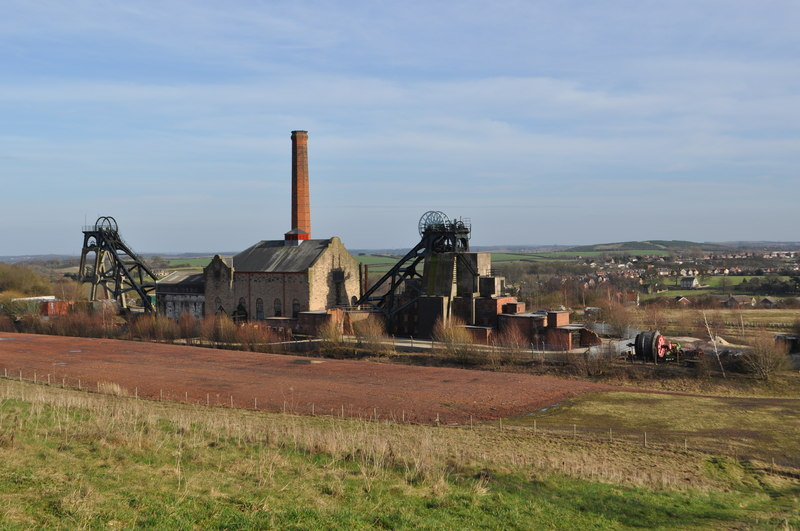
The colliery in 2011

Pleasley Colliery is a former coal mine in central England. It is located to the north-west of Pleasley village, which sits above the north bank of the River Meden on the Nottinghamshire/Derbyshire border. It lies 3 miles (4.8 km) north of Mansfield and 9 miles (14.5 km) south of Chesterfield. From the south it commands a prominent position on the skyline, although less so now than when the winders were in operation and both chimney stacks were in place. The colliery is situated at about 500 ft (152m) above sea level and is aligned on a NE–SW axis following the trend of the river valley at this point.

After closure of the colliery in 1983, most of the surface infrastructure was demolished and what remains are the two headstocks which stood above the shafts, the engine-house complex, containing the two steam winders which were used to raise the coal, one dating from 1905 and the other from 1922, and one of the 40 m high brick chimneys which served the steam boiler range. The engine-house complex is a Grade II listed building and the site has been scheduled as an Ancient Monument.

The site is owned and managed by the Land Trust and the licensed occupiers are the Friends of Pleasley Pit restoration group who set the wheels in motion to ensure the preservation of the site and have been responsible for the renovation the two unique steam winders. The parent organisation of the Friends is the Pleasley Pit Trust, a registered charity, which is undertaking the transformation of the site into a mining heritage centre.

The old pit tip was reworked to extract residual coal, after which it was landscaped to create a nature reserve consisting of footpaths and lakes. The two adjacent railway lines were part of an extensive network serving the Nottinghamshire–Derbyshire coal field and the disused tracks have been converted into cycle trails linking the former collieries to the west and nearby Hardwick Hall.

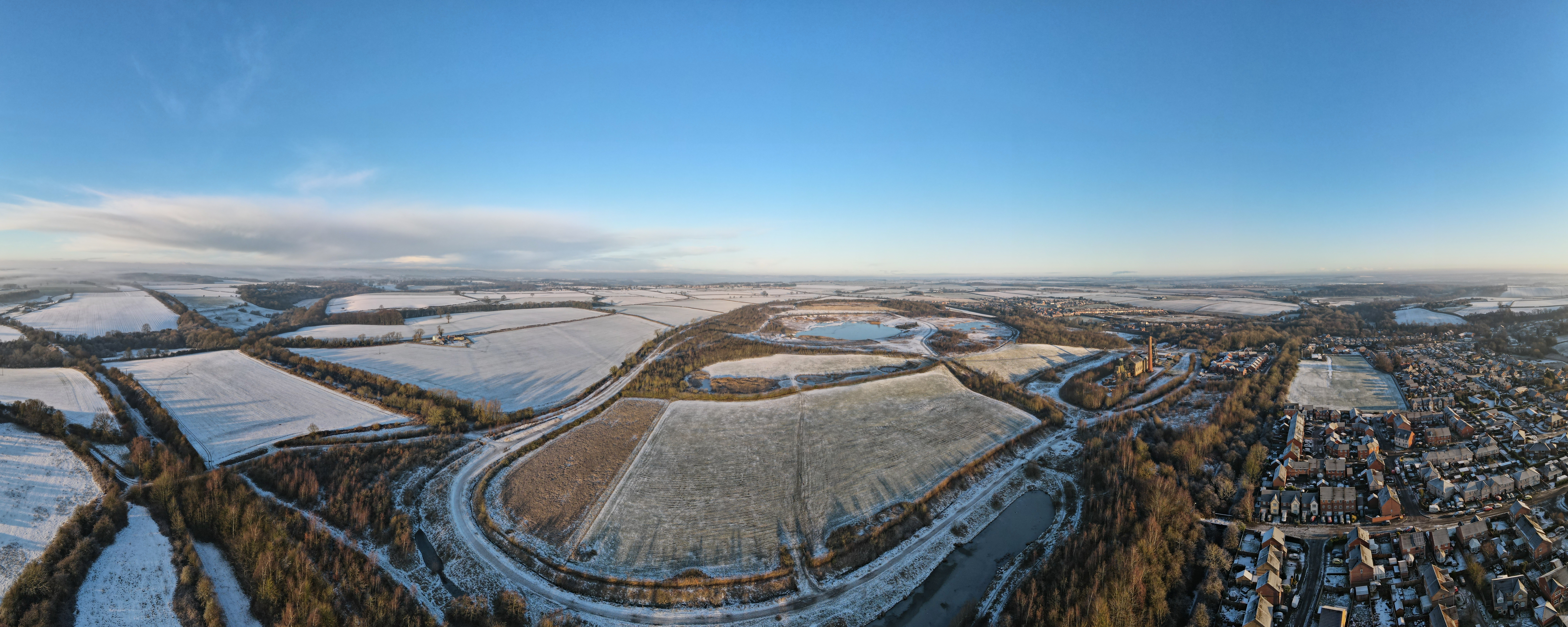
Pleasley Pit & Country Park in 2020

== History ==
=== Timeline ===
It was sunk in the 1870s and produced coal until 1983. It still retains its headstocks, engine-houses and steam winders, one of which was installed in 1905 by Lilleshall Co. Ltd. and the other in 1922 by Markham & Co. Ltd. Pleasley Colliery is now a Scheduled Monument and is in the process of being developed into a mining heritage site. The headstocks, engine-houses and chimney have undergone major conservation work and the two unique steam winders have been restored by members of the Friends of Pleasley Pit preservation group.

=== 1872–1879 ===
In 1870, the Stanton Iron Company (SIC) began looking for a new colliery to provide additional fuel for their blast furnanaces and, having learnt that good coal had been discovered in a borehole at Pleasley a few miles east of their new one at Teversal, they began negotiations with the landowner and in 1872 a lease for the extraction of coal from the Top Hard seam, together with the construction and operation of a colliery, was granted to the Company by William Edward Nightingale, the father of the famous Victorian nursing pioneer, Florence Nightingale. (Florence is reputed to have “turned the first sod” at the commencement of sinking). William (né Shore) was lord of the manor of Pleasley, having bought the manor in 1823 for £38,000. He died in a tragic accident in 1874 and the manor passed to his other daughter, Parthenon, the wife of Sir Harry Verney. A large field on the brow of the hill overlooking the River Meden valley was chosen and work soon started on levelling the site and preparing the surface infrastructure and access roads.

During 1873 sinking commenced at the two 14.5 ft. diameter shafts and the engine-houses were constructed in time for the installation the following year of two pairs of steam winding engines built by the Worsley Mesnes Iron Co which were initially used for powering the pumps. The sinking soon ran into difficulties due to the high volumes of water encountered in the first 150 yds and progress was halted for four to five months after the sinking pumps had been overwhelmed. In order to deal with the large feeders of water now encountered, four 18" diameter pumps were then installed in the No. 1 shaft and sinking at the No. 2 shaft was discontinued. The subsequent impact of the pumping was considerable, with wells and springs over a wide area drying up and the water disappearing from the Mansfield quarries almost 3 miles away.

In order to hold back the water, the shaft had to be lined for about 115 yds with cast-iron tubbing, a slow and expensive operation. When sinking was resumed below this, the strata was much drier and most of the pumping equipment was removed. Sinking proceeded without further problems and the Top Hard seam was eventually reached in February 1877. The pumps were then installed in the No. 2 shaft and sinking was resumed there. Similar volumes of water were encountered and this shaft also required the installation of a similar length of tubbing. Later that year, in order to raise further capital, the Stanton Iron Co. decided to incorporate as a limited company and, early in 1878, 5,752 shares were issued. The sinking headframes were then removed at the No. 1 shaft and the permanent headstocks erected. By the end of the year, the fitting-out work above and below ground was approaching completion and when the Top Hard seam was finally reached in the No. 2 shaft in February 1879 the Directors could report that the sinking had been completed and that production was ready to commence.

=== 1881–1890 ===
The sinking coincided with the onset of a serious depression in the iron and coal trade and although this continued for a number of years, output from Pleasley began to steadily increase thanks to its freedom from serious geological problems. A disturbed fault zone was soon encountered a short distance to the north-east but the workings to the north and west were fault-free. In 1881 electric lighting of the pit bottom and the coal face was demonstrated to the Royal Commission on Accidents in Mines by the electrical engineer R.E.B. Crompton. By October of that year the monthly output was about 9,600 tons and by August the following year it had risen to 13,000 tons. Two years later, the figure for August stood at 17,250 tons, outstripping that of Stanton Iron Co.’s first colliery at Teversal which had been in operation since 1868.

In 1888 production had increased to such an extent that the main winding shaft had reached its maximum capacity. The upcast shaft was then fitted out for coal winding and output continued to climb. By 1890, with output averaging 1,000 tons per day, the underground haulage of coal from the North Dips workings by ponies had become unsustainable and a 60 hp electrically driven underground rope-haulage system – the first of its kind in the world – was installed near the downcast pit bottom to haul coal up the 1-in-12 roadway from the north workings. During the next seven years, a further four electrically driven rope haulages were installed, freeing up 44 horses and raising output to 1,700 tons per day.

=== 1899–1919 ===
By 1899, despite having encountered a 25 ft. fault and an extensive washout in the workings to the west, output was such that the winding capacity had been reached at the upcast shaft and it was decided to install a more powerful winder and boilers, whilst at the same time replacing the old wooden headstock which was now in poor condition. This work was carried out in 1900, with all production temporarily shifted to the downcast shaft by means of two-shift working. The following year, owing to the very poor condition of the old timber frame, the headstock at the downcast shaft was also replaced, although this time it was pre-erected on the pit-top and then winched into position.

Over the next two decades, many changes took place on the surface. In 1904 the drum shaft on the downcast shaft winder fractured and a new, more powerful winder was installed. Older boilers were replaced, more powerful fans were installed, a new screening plant erected and turbine generators running off the exhaust steam from the winders were commissioned. Finally, in 1919, work commenced on deepening the upcast shaft to enable access to the lower seams

=== 1921–1938 ===
In 1921 the deepening to the Blackshale seam was completed. In order to wind from this level a much larger winder was installed requiring the engine-house to be completely rebuilt to accommodate it. The steam plant was consolidated into a single range of boilers, and a new power-house containing a large mixed-pressure turbo-generator was constructed.

Following inspection of the deeper seams, it was decided to only work the Deep Hard coal at that point. A 1-in-2 cross-measures drift was driven from the Top Hard seam for ventilation purposes and the opening-out began. Three longwall faces in the 3 ft thick seam were commenced, but the ensuing recession appears to have made it uneconomic, and production ceased in 1927, all output then being concentrated back in the Top Hard seam, the workings of which were now becoming quite extensive. By this time, most of the coal to the north of the river Meden had been worked out and production had shifted to the reserves to the south. By the late 1930s, however, these reserves were diminishing rapidly, and exploratory working began in the two underlying seams, the Dunsil and 1st Waterloo.

In 1938, 1,261 men were employed underground and a further 283 on the surface. Electric coal-cutters had been in use for some time, but the coal was still being hand loaded, although now onto conveyor belts on the coal-face rather than directly into tubs. The new seams were considerably thinner than the 5.5 ft. thick Top Hard and it was anticipated that a larger quantity of small coal would be created. In order to process this, a 150-ton-per-hour washery plant was constructed a few hundred yards to the south-west. This plant was to play a key role in subsequent years when mechanized loading was introduced and the demand for small coal for power generation soared.

=== 1945–1951 ===
After World War II, the development of the Dunsil and 1st Waterloo seams accelerated and once again the Deep Hard seam was revisited. Manpower was in short supply, though. In 1945, although there were still 281 men on the surface, there were only 895 underground. Now, however, Huwood power loaders were being deployed on the coal face and the washery plant really began to earn its keep. In the late 1940s, following nationalisation, a major development program was begun. Tubs were replaced by 3-ton mine-cars, and on the surface, compact circuits were constructed with fully automatic pneumatic systems controlling their movement and emptying.

At the downcast shaft, a complete new pit-bottom and mine-car haulage system was constructed in the deeper 2nd Waterloo seam, with the shaft itself being deepened by driving up from below, whilst in the upcast pit-bottom, a compact mine-car circuit was constructed, with the coal now being transported almost to the shaft-side by powerful trunk conveyor belts.

In 1951, the last face in the Top Hard seam finished, more than three miles travelling distance south of the pit bottom, but the main output from the downcast shaft had already moved to the Dunsil and 1st Waterloo seams. At this time, the Dunsil was being worked to the south-east of the shaft, whilst the 1st Waterloo workings were to the north-west. Meanwhile, in the Deep Hard seam, whilst redevelopment proceeded, production was focused on the north side.

=== 1957–1983 ===
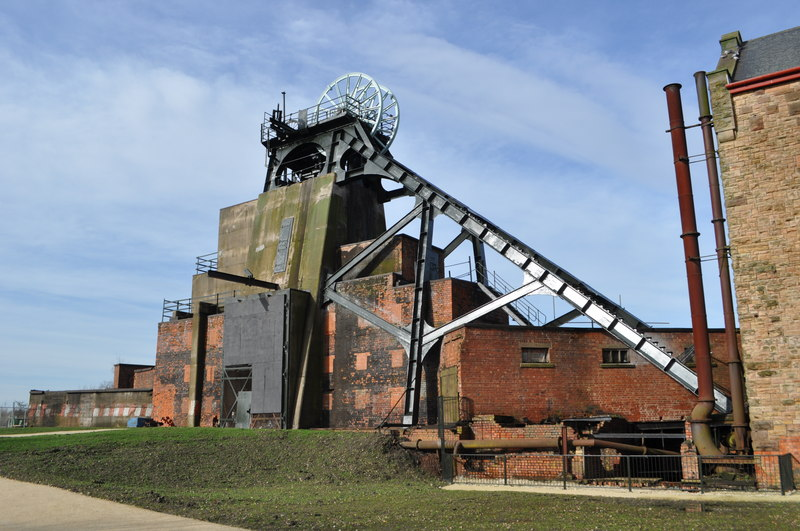
Pleasley Colliery, South Shaft

In 1957 Pleasley saw the launch of a short enclosed tunnel carrying the trunk conveyor from the main intake airway through into a return airway close to the pit-bottom. With typical mining humour, it was named Sputnik by the men. Its official name has been long forgotten.

At about this time, cross-measure drifts were also being driven down to the underlying Piper seam to the south of the pit-bottom and a new face was headed out. This face advanced below the earlier workings in the Deep Hard until it had reached a position beyond their final working point. Near to the pit-bottom, the Piper seam was separated from the Deep Hard by about 10 yds but as the face moved out, the distance decreased until they were separated by only a short distance. At this point short drifts were driven up into the Deep Hard and new faces were then opened out back in this seam and within a short distance they were working a combined thickness of coal of about 2–2.5 m. Two other faces had been opened out closer to the pit-bottom in the Piper, but no further development took place in that seam except for a parallel one running back towards the pit-bottom.

By this time, production had ceased both in the Dunsil and 1st Waterloo seams and in the Deep Hard north-side districts. All subsequent output now came from the combined Deep Hard / Piper workings to the south-east. Although the projected output was high, the surface infrastructure at Pleasley was now feeling its age, and with the sinking of a large surface drift and the construction of new coal processing plant at nearby Shirebrook colliery it was decided to switch all output to there. With the cessation of coal-winding at Pleasley, the colliery had breathed its last, but it received a sort of artificial respiration by being used for man-riding and materials until eventual closure in 1983.

=== 1983–1996 ===
The upcast shaft was converted to supply air to Shirebrook's workings for several years and this turned out to be a blessing in disguise. The work involved in filling the downcast shaft, together with the removal of the baths, washery, screens etc. all took time, and provided the opportunity for the local authority to issue a preservation listing on what remained just as their demolition began in 1986. It then continued in a state of limbo for several more years until 1995 when the preservation group Friends of Pleasley Pit was formed and restoration work began. In 1996 Pleasley Colliery was scheduled as an Ancient Monument and the rapidly deteriorating roof on the engine-house complex was completely renewed and the 40 m tall brick chimney underwent major renovation.

=== 1996-2016 ===
In the 10 years following the formation of the Friends of Pleasley Pit an enormous amount of work was done by the volunteers: first in clearing out the years of accumulated filth from inside the engine-house complex and then beginning the difficult task of dismantling the two steam winders ready for their subsequent renovation. By the end of 2005 the No. 1 winder had been reassembled and painted, and by 2007 it was being turned by an electric-motor friction drive. Restoration work then focused on the much larger No. 2 winder. In 2010, with funding provided by English Heritage, the two headstocks and the engine-house complex underwent major conservation repairs by Robert Woodhouse Ltd., and as a result of the combined efforts of everyone involved, the restoration work won several regional and national awards, including the English Heritage Angel Awards in 2011 and the EMCBE Constructing Excellence Heritage Awards. Meanwhile, the restoration and preservation of the two steam winding engines that are such a special feature of this mining heritage site continues in the capable hands of the Friends of Pleasley Pit volunteers, whose next objective is to commission an electric-motor friction drive for the No. 2 winder, before beginning the next phase of converting the No. 1 winder to be turned by steam.

== See also ==
- Listed buildings in Pleasley

== Sources ==
- John Farey: General view of the agriculture and minerals of Derbyshire, 1811
- UK Ordnance Survey 6-inch map: 1938
- The geology of the country around Nottingham, BGS Memoire (quarter sheet 71NE...), 1852
- Geology of the country around Chesterfield, Matlock and Mansfield, BGS Memoire, 1961
- British Geological Survey (BGS) 6-inch maps : 1875 - 2012
- Edward Hull, FRS: The Coalfields of Great Britain, 5th Ed. 1905
- Sir Arthur Truman: The Coalfields of Great Britain, 1st Ed. 1953
- The concealed Coalfield of Yorkshire and Nottinghamshire, BGS Publications, 1913
- The concealed Coalfield of Yorkshire and Nottinghamshire, BGS Publications, 1951
- UK Ordnance Survey 1in: 1837
- UK Ordnance Survey 6in and 25in: 1875 - 1960
- Stanle Pigott, Hollins a Study of Industry 1784-1949, 1949, pp 61-63
- Experiments with electric lighting on the coal face at Pleasley Colliery, July 1891
- Mansfield & N Notts Chronical Advertiser: 1872 - 1951
- Stanton Ironworks Co. Ltd archives, Derbyshire Records Office, Matlock, Derbyshire.
- Colliery Guardian, 1891
- Transactions of Nottingham Mining Students, 1923
- Colliery Engineering, 1952
- National Coal Board: Pleasley Colliery, 1873–1973 (NCB, North Derbyshire Area, 1973)

== Bibliography ==
- Southworth, P.J.M. Pleasley Pit and its Steam Winding Engines. 2004. Published by author. ISBN 0-9511856-3-2
- Gale & Nicholls, The Lilleshall Company Limited, a history 174-1964, 1979, ISBN 0-86190-000-6
- S.D. Chapman, Stanton and Stavely a business history, 1981, ISBN 0-85941-172-9
