= Pleasley West railway station =

Former railway station in Derbyshire, England

Pleasley West
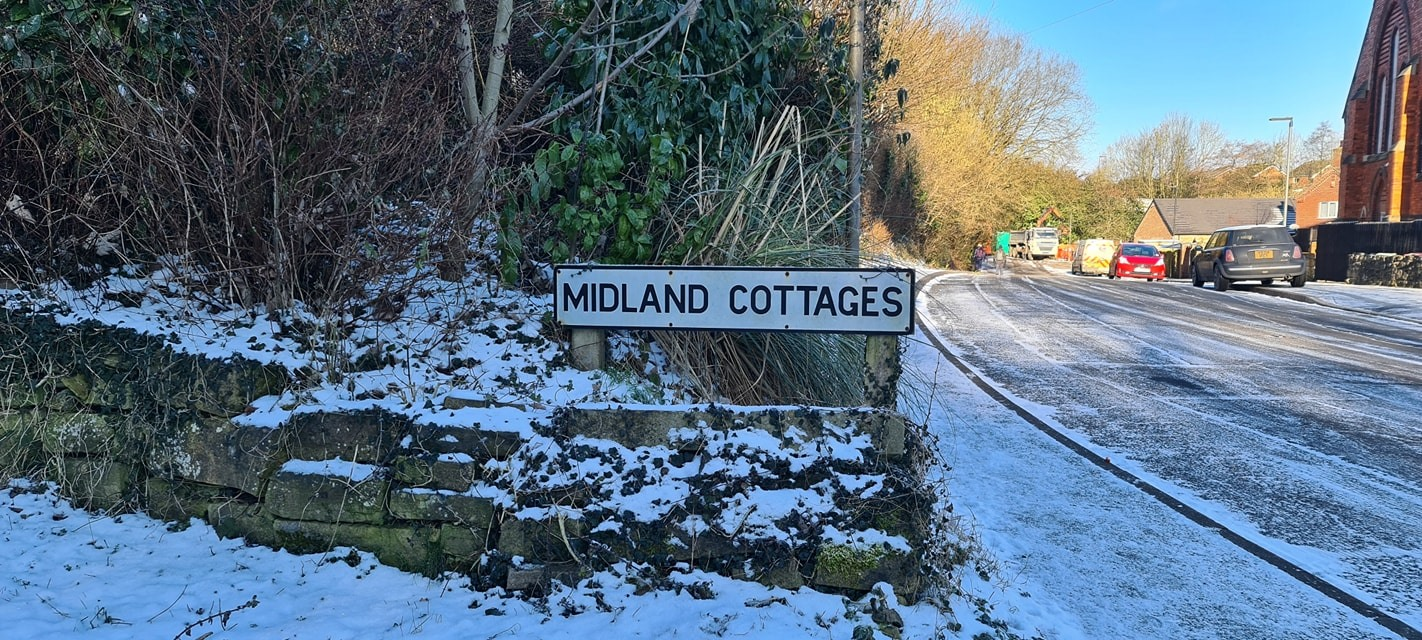

General information
- Location: Old Chesterfield Road, Pleasley, Bolsover & Mansfield; England
- Coordinates: 53.1760°N 1.2530°W
- Grid reference: SK 501 644
- Platforms: 2 originally, reduced to 1 before 1950

Other information
- Status: Disused

History
- Original company: Midland Railway
- Post-grouping: LMSR

Key dates
- 11 May 1886: Opened as "Pleasley", Teversall & Pleasley Branch
- 1 September 1890: Opened Doe Lea Branch
- 28 July 1930: Both lines closed to timetabled passenger traffic
- 1950: Renamed "Pleasley West"
- 1963: Last excursion train
- 3 March 1964: Line severed to the North
- 7 January 1981: Line closed completely
- by November 1982: Tracks lifted
Location

Pleasley West was a railway station on the Doe Lea line in Pleasley, Derbyshire, England on the border of Derbyshire and Nottinghamshire. It opened in 1886 and closed to scheduled services in 1930, though it was served by excursion trains until 1964.

== Context ==
The station was built by the Midland Railway near the junction of the circuitous Mansfield Woodhouse to Westhouses via Teversall Manor line known as "The Teversall & Pleasley Branch" and the equally circuitous Barrow Hill to Pleasley line known as the Doe Lea Branch because it ran for much of its length along the valley of the River Doe Lea.

The railways always spelt Teversal as "Teversall", most other sources use "Teversal." In this article Teversall is used for railway items, and Teversal otherwise.

== History ==
The station was opened without ceremony on 11 May 1886 when the Teversall & Pleasley Branch opened to passenger traffic. It initially provided a service of four trains each way between Mansfield and Alfreton via Mansfield Woodhouse, Teversal and Tibshelf, taking about 40 minutes from end to end. Services more than doubled on 1 September 1890 when the Doe Lea Branch opened, giving four trains a day from Mansfield to Chesterfield via Mansfield Woodhouse, Bolsover and Barrow Hill.

The station originally had two platforms with a typical MR country station building on the western (northbound) side. Unusually the signal box was on one of the platforms. By 1950 all trace of the southbound platform had been erased.

By 1930 the passenger service South from Pleasley West to Westhouses was down to one train a day southbound and, curiously, two a day northbound. Normal passenger traffic along the Doe Lea Branch was three trains a day with an extra on Saturdays. On 28 July 1930 both passenger services were withdrawn. Glapwell Colliery and others in the Doe Lea Valley were still going strong at this time, but all their coal went out northwards, so very little traffic passed through the steep line through Rowthorn Tunnel. The opportunity was therefore taken to abandon the line from just south of Glapwell station to Pleasley Colliery West Junction, a short distance South of Pleasley West, though a short length was left at the Pleasley end as a siding.

Although closed in 1930 the station remained physically intact and was used until 1963 for excursion traffic to places such as Skegness. It was therefore duly renamed in 1950 from "Pleasley" to "Pleasley West" to avoid confusion with its neighbour which became "Pleasley East".

Through traffic was rendered impossible from 1964 when the line North from Pleasley Colliery to the junction with what is now the Robin Hood Line closed. Pleasley Colliery subsequently sent its coal underground to Shirebrook and Teversal Colliery closed in 1980 after which the line through Pleasley West was redundant. It was closed on 7 January 1981 and lifted by November 1982. The station has been razed to the ground.

== Modern times ==
Parts of the trackbed and those of neighbouring lines have been turned into public footpaths and bridleways.

Preceding station	Disused railways	Following station
Rowthorn and Hardwick; Line and station closed	Midland Railway; Doe Lea Branch	Mansfield Woodhouse; Line closed, station open
Teversall Manor; Line and station closed	Midland Railway; Teversall & Pleasley Branch	Mansfield Woodhouse; Line closed, station open
