= River Doe Lea =

River in the Derbyshire, England

Doe Lea
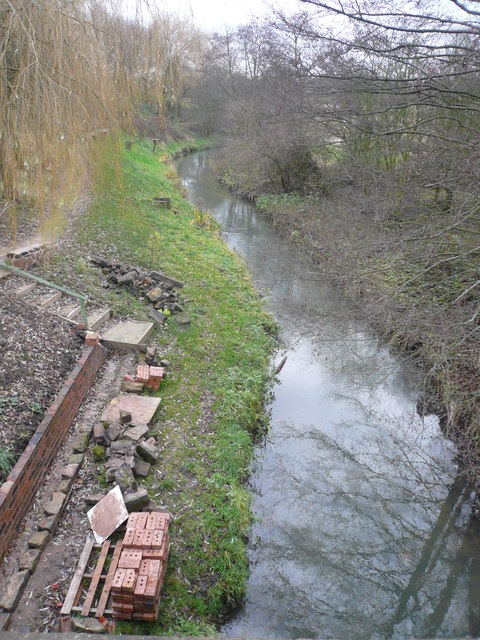
- The river near Doe Lea

Location
- Country: England

Physical characteristics
- Source
  - location: Pilsley
  - elevation: 705 feet (215 m)
- Mouth
  - location: River Rother
  - coordinates: 53.2894°N 1.3373°W
  - elevation: 163 feet (50 m)
- Length: 11 mi (18 km)

The River Doe Lea is a river which flows near Glapwell and Doe Lea in Derbyshire, England. The river eventually joins the River Rother near Renishaw. The river contained 1,000 times the safe level of dioxins in 1991, according to a statement made by Dennis Skinner, (MP) in the House of Commons in 1992. The river flows through the site of the former Coalite plant near Bolsover, where coke, tar and industrial chemicals were manufactured until the plant closed in 2004.

The stream section is designated an SSSI for its geological interest.

== Hydrology ==
The river flows in a generally south to north direction through a region where the underlying geology is predominantly Carboniferous coal measures. To the east of its catchment there is a band of Permian Magnesian Limestone, which forms an escarpment. Magnesian Limestone is so called because it contains quantities of the mineral dolomite, which is rich in magnesium. The river and its tributary streams drain an area of about 26.2 square miles (68 km^{2}). During its 11-mile (18 km) course, it descends from an altitude of 705 feet (215 m) to around 163 feet (50 m) at the point where it joins the River Rother.

The stream section of the river is a designated geological Site of Special Scientific Interest; according to the SSSI citation, it "shows an internationally significant section through the Upper Coal Measures of the Carboniferous" and is "one of Britain's most important geological sites."

== Route ==
The river rises as a series of springs near Tibshelf, and flows generally northwards, with the M1 motorway following its course a little to the west. Just before it reaches Hardwick Park, it is joined by another stream which rises at Hardstoft and flows eastwards under the motorway. Hardwick Park contains a grade I listed country house, built in the 1590s and now owned by the National Trust, while the river feeds two lakes, the Great Pond and the Millers Pond. Two more streams, rising at Hardstoft Common and Common End combine near Stainsby Pond, and flow under the motorway to join the Doe Lea. The combined flow has powered Stainsby water mill since the thirteenth century. The present structure was restored in 1850, and worked commercially until 1952. It is now owned by the National Trust, and still operates to grind flour for sale to visitors.

At the village of Doe Lea, the A617 road crosses as it approaches junction 29 on the motorway, as does a minor road to Palterton. A stream joins from the east, and another from Sutton Scarsdale joins from the west. The river passes under Doe Lea bridge, which carries another minor road, beyond which a small section of the stream has been designated as a Site of Special Scientific Interest (SSSI). 0.336 acres (0.136 ha) were so designated in 1988, because of its geological interest. Beyond the SSSI, the river passes a series of lakes to the west of Bolsover. The southern part of this area is known as the Carr Vale Flash, and is a nature reserve managed by the Derbyshire Wildlife Trust. To the north of it is the Peter Fidler Reserve, managed by Derbyshire County Council, and named after Peter Fidler, who was born nearby at Mill Farm in 1769. He went on to explore North America for the Hudson's Bay Company, and became its chief surveyor in Canada.

The river continues under bridges on the A632 and B6418 roads, next to the former site of the Coalite plant which closed in 2004, and an industrial railway runs parallel to it which crosses to the west bank before both pass under the motorway. The railway crosses twice more, between which a stream from Barlborough Common joins from the north east, and after which Poolsbrook, which flows northwards from Arkwright Town and Duckmanton, joins. The A619 road crosses between Staveley and Mastin Moor. The river then flows into the Norbriggs Flash nature reserve. The course of the river was ‘re-meandered’ by the landowner, Chesterfield Borough Council in 2018. This work involved the creation of a dam on the straightened section to direct the river into reconnected oxbow lakes. Further downstream, the river passed under the Chesterfield Canal through an oval culvert, constructed of brick and stone. Due to its small size, the culvert was removed in the 1970s by removing a section of the closed canal. When the canal is restored, the river will be spanned by a 37-metre (121 ft) aqueduct. Just before its junction with the River Rother to the south of Renishaw, a former railway bridge carries the Trans Pennine Trail long-distance footpath over the river.

== Water quality ==
In common with most of the rivers of the River Don catchment, and especially the River Rother, the Doe Lea was affected by the development of coal mining in the nineteenth century. Small villages developed rapidly to service the new collieries, often with little or no provision for sewage treatment. Consequently, sewage entered the river, together with minewater, which often contained large volumes of solids, which were deposited on the bed of the river and choked plant life. The minewater also contained heavy metals, arsenic, cyanides and phenols, all of which are toxic to fish. By the beginning of the twentieth century, the river was little more than a lifeless sewer.

Despite the pollution of the lower river, the upper reaches retained a population of fish. Brown trout were present around Stainsby, and there were small numbers of coarse fish, which had originated in the lakes at Hardwick Hall. They could not exist further down river, because of the pollution. Part of the problem was caused by efforts to reduce air pollution, which resulted in the production of smokeless fuels. While this reduced smoke from domestic fires, the liquors which were removed from the coal were highly toxic and rich in ammonia. The coking plant at Bolsover run by Coalite was a significant producer of pollution, and the site was also producing chlorinated compounds by distilling the liquors resulting from the coking process, which added to the toxic mix. The effluent was treated by an activated sludge process, before discharge to the river.

Efforts were made to improve the quality of the effluent in 1984 and in 1989. The river was also affected by dioxins, and in February 1992, Dennis Skinner MP raised the issue in the House of Commons, because sampling by the National Rivers Authority revealed that dioxin levels were over 1000 times safe levels. Two years later, Her Majesty's Inspectorate of Pollution took control of the works, and in 1996 new storage lagoons were built, to contain surface drainage water in times of flood. These measures lead to a steady decrease in the biochemical oxygen demand in the river, and in the Rother. Although the plant closed in 2004, experience on the River Dearne and elsewhere would suggest that it may be many years before leaching of chemicals into the river finally ceases.

The Environment Agency measure water quality of the river systems in England. Each is given an overall ecological status, which may be one of five levels: high, good, moderate, poor and bad. There are several components that are used to determine this, including biological status, which looks at the quantity and varieties of invertebrates, angiosperms and fish. Chemical status, which compares the concentrations of various chemicals against known safe concentrations, is rated good or fail.

The water quality of the Doe Lea was as follows in 2019.

Section	Ecological Status	Chemical Status	Length	Catchment	Channel
Doe Lea from Source to Hawke Brook	Moderate	Fail	10.6 miles (17.1 km)	16.34 square miles (42.3 km^{2})	heavily modified
Doe Lea from Hawke Brooke to River Rother	Moderate	Fail	2.8 miles (4.5 km)	2.55 square miles (6.6 km^{2})	heavily modified
Hawke Brook from Source to Doe Lea	Poor	Fail	5.8 miles (9.3 km)	4.16 square miles (10.8 km^{2})	
Pools Brook from Source to Doe Lea	Moderate	Fail	3.2 miles (5.1 km)	4.82 square miles (12.5 km^{2})	heavily modified

Hawke Brook was classified as bad in 2009, and has seen considerable improvement since. The lower Doe Lea is quite variable, in that it was rated poor on biological grounds, but high in relation to specific pollutants, both of which are sub-categories of the ecological status. Like most rivers in the UK, the chemical status changed from good to fail in 2019, due to the presence of polybrominated diphenyl ethers (PBDE), perfluorooctane sulphonate (PFOS), mercury compounds, and cypermethrin, none of which had previously been included in the assessment.

== Points of interest ==
Point	Coordinates (Links to map resources)	OS Grid Ref	Notes
Junction with River Rother	53.2897°N 1.3369°W	SK443771	Mouth, Renishaw
Junction with Pools Brook	53.2638°N 1.3419°W	SK439742	Staveley
M1 Motorway bridge	53.2556°N 1.3268°W	SK450733	Staveley
Bolsover Nature Reserves	53.2251°N 1.3133°W	SK459700	
Stainsby Mill	53.1828°N 1.3190°W	SK456652	
Great Pond, Hardwick Hall	53.1696°N 1.3201°W	SK455638	
Hardstoft springs	53.1601°N 1.3419°W	SK441627	
Source at Tibshelf Wharf	53.1443°N 1.3181°W	SK457610	

== See also ==
- List of rivers in England

== Bibliography ==
- Firth, Christopher (1997). Domesday to the dawn of the New Millennium - 900 years of the Don fishery (PDF). Environment Agency. Archived (PDF) from the original on 17 July 2019. (This is available online at The Don Catchment Rivers Trust. Page numbers refer to the pdf file).
- Lexartza-Artza, Irantzu; Lerner, David; Tkachenko, Nataliya (August 2009). "Preliminary Study of the Doe Lea Catchment" (PDF). University of Sheffield. Archived (PDF) from the original on 8 February 2021.
