= List of United Kingdom locations: Cl-Cn =

The United Kingdom

This is part of the list of United Kingdom locations: a gazetteer of place names in the United Kingdom showing each place's locality and geographical coordinates.

== Cl ==
=== Cla ===
==== Clab-Clap ====
Location	Locality	Coordinates (links to map & photo sources)	OS grid reference
Clabhach	Argyll and Bute	56.62°N 06.60°W	NM1858
Clachaig	Highland	57.24°N 03.62°W	NJ0218
Clachaig	Argyll and Bute	55.98°N 05.03°W	NS1181
Clachan (Sutherland)	Highland	58.52°N 04.23°W	NC7062
Clachan (Skye)	Highland	57.61°N 06.20°W	NG4966
Clachan (Raasay)	Highland	57.34°N 06.09°W	NG5436
Clachan	Western Isles	57.39°N 07.37°W	NF7746
Clachan (Cowal)	Argyll and Bute	56.16°N 05.07°W	NN0901
Clachan (Kintyre)	Argyll and Bute	55.74°N 05.57°W	NR7656
Clachan (Lismore)	Argyll and Bute	56.53°N 05.48°W	NM8643
Clachan an Luib	Western Isles	57.54°N 07.33°W	NF8163
Clachan of Campsie	East Dunbartonshire	55.98°N 04.22°W	NS6179
Clachan of Glendaruel	Argyll and Bute	56.00°N 05.22°W	NR9984
Clachan Seil	Argyll and Bute	56.31°N 05.59°W	NM7819
Clachbreck	Argyll and Bute	55.91°N 05.58°W	NR7675
Clachnaharry	Highland	57.48°N 04.25°W	NH6546
Clachtoll	Highland	58.18°N 05.33°W	NC0427
Clackmannan	Clackmannanshire	56.09°N 03.75°W	NS9191
Clackmarras	Moray	57.60°N 03.27°W	NJ2458
Clacton-on-Sea	Essex	51.79°N 01.14°E	TM1715
Cladach	North Ayrshire	55.58°N 05.15°W	NS0137
Cladach a' Bhaile Shear	Western Isles	57.53°N 07.33°W	NF8162
Claddach	Argyll and Bute	55.68°N 06.52°W	NR1653
Claddach Illeray	Western Isles	57.55°N 07.36°W	NF7964
Claddach Kirkibost	Western Isles	57.56°N 07.38°W	NF7865
Claddach-knockline	Western Isles	57.57°N 07.43°W	NF7567
Cladh a' Mhanaich	Highland	57.74°N 06.43°W	NG361813
Cladich	Argyll and Bute	56.34°N 05.09°W	NN0921
Cladswell	Worcestershire	52.22°N 01.94°W	SP0458
Claggan	Highland	56.81°N 05.09°W	NN1174
Claigan	Highland	57.48°N 06.62°W	NG2353
Claines	Worcestershire	52.22°N 02.22°W	SO8558
Clairinsh	Stirling	56.07°N 04.54°W	NS415896
Clandown	Bath and North East Somerset	51.29°N 02.46°W	ST6855
Clanfield	Hampshire	50.93°N 01.00°W	SU7016
Clanfield	Oxfordshire	51.70°N 01.59°W	SP2801
Clanking	Buckinghamshire	51.75°N 00.81°W	SP8207
Clanville	Hampshire	51.23°N 01.55°W	SU3149
Clanville	Somerset	51.08°N 02.54°W	ST6232
Clanville	Wiltshire	51.51°N 02.11°W	ST9279
Claonaig	Argyll and Bute	55.75°N 05.39°W	NR8756
Clapgate	Dorset	50.81°N 01.98°W	SU0102
Clapgate	Hertfordshire	51.90°N 00.09°E	TL4425
Clapham	Bedfordshire	52.16°N 00.50°W	TL0253
Clapham	Devon	50.67°N 03.57°W	SX8987
Clapham	Lambeth	51.45°N 00.14°W	TQ2975
Clapham	North Yorkshire	54.11°N 02.39°W	SD7469
Clapham	West Sussex	50.84°N 00.45°W	TQ0906
Clapham Green	Bedfordshire	52.15°N 00.49°W	TL0352
Clapham Green	North Yorkshire	54.01°N 01.63°W	SE2458
Clapham Hill	Kent	51.33°N 01.01°E	TR1064
Clapham Park	Wandsworth	51.45°N 00.14°W	TQ2974
Clap Hill	Kent	51.08°N 00.92°E	TR0536
Clapper	Cornwall	50.50°N 04.82°W	SX0071
Clapper Hill	Kent	51.09°N 00.62°E	TQ8436
Clappersgate	Cumbria	54.41°N 02.98°W	NY3603
Clapton	Berkshire	51.42°N 01.45°W	SU3870
Clapton (Wayford)	Somerset	50.85°N 02.83°W	ST4106
Clapton (Ston Easton)	Somerset	51.27°N 02.51°W	ST6453
Clapton in Gordano	North Somerset	51.46°N 02.76°W	ST4774
Clapton-on-the-Hill	Gloucestershire	51.85°N 01.76°W	SP1617
Clapton Park	Hackney	51.54°N 00.05°W	TQ3585
Clapworthy	Devon	51.00°N 03.89°W	SS6724

==== Clar ====
Location	Locality	Coordinates (links to map & photo sources)	OS grid reference
Clarach	Ceredigion	52.42°N 04.06°W	SN6083
Clara Vale	Gateshead	54.97°N 01.79°W	NZ1364
Clarbeston	Pembrokeshire	51.85°N 04.84°W	SN0421
Clarbeston Road	Pembrokeshire	51.84°N 04.89°W	SN0120
Clarborough	Nottinghamshire	53.33°N 00.90°W	SK7383
Clare	Oxfordshire	51.67°N 01.03°W	SU6798
Clare	Suffolk	52.07°N 00.56°E	TL7645
Claregate	Wolverhampton	52.60°N 02.16°W	SJ8901
Claremont Park	Surrey	51.35°N 00.37°W	TQ1363
Claremount	Calderdale	53.72°N 01.86°W	SE0925
Clarencefield	Dumfries and Galloway	54.99°N 03.42°W	NY0968
Clarence Park	North Somerset	51.33°N 02.99°W	ST3160
Clarendon Park	City of Leicester	52.61°N 01.12°W	SK5902
Clareston	Pembrokeshire	51.75°N 04.97°W	SM9510
Clareton	North Yorkshire	54.03°N 01.41°W	SM9510
Clarilaw	Scottish Borders	55.53°N 02.71°W	NT5527
Clarken Green	Hampshire	51.24°N 01.19°W	SU5650
Clark Green	Cheshire	53.30°N 02.10°W	SJ9379
Clarksfield	Oldham	53.53°N 02.09°W	SD9404
Clark's Green	Surrey	51.13°N 00.32°W	TQ1739
Clark's Hill	Lincolnshire	52.76°N 00.04°E	TF3820
Clarkston	North Lanarkshire	55.87°N 03.96°W	NS7766
Clarkston	East Renfrewshire	55.77°N 04.29°W	NS5656

==== Clas-Clau ====
Location	Locality	Coordinates (links to map & photo sources)	OS grid reference
Clase	Swansea	51.65°N 03.95°W	SS6597
Clashandorran	Highland	57.49°N 04.48°W	NH5148
Clashmore (Assynt)	Highland	58.22°N 05.35°W	NC0331
Clashmore (Dornoch)	Highland	57.87°N 04.12°W	NH7489
Clashnessie	Highland	58.21°N 05.32°W	NC0530
Clashnoir	Moray	57.28°N 03.29°W	NJ2222
Clate	Shetland Islands	60.33°N 01.02°W	HU5461
Clatford	Wiltshire	51.41°N 01.78°W	SU1568
Clatford Oakcuts	Hampshire	51.14°N 01.52°W	SU3339
Clathy	Perth and Kinross	56.35°N 03.63°W	NN9919
Clatt	Aberdeenshire	57.31°N 02.78°W	NJ5325
Clatter	Powys	52.53°N 03.49°W	SN9994
Clatterford	Isle of Wight	50.68°N 01.32°W	SZ4887
Clatterford End (Chelmsford)	Essex	51.79°N 00.33°E	TL6113
Clatterford End (Toot Hill)	Essex	51.69°N 00.19°E	TL5202
Clatterford End (Fyfield)	Essex	51.73°N 00.25°E	TL5606
Clatto	Fife	56.32°N 02.92°W	NO4315
Clatworthy	Somerset	51.06°N 03.35°W	ST0530
Clauchlands	North Ayrshire	55.54°N 05.10°W	NS0432
Clauchlands Point	North Ayrshire	55.55°N 05.09°W	NS050329
Claughton (Lancaster)	Lancashire	54.08°N 02.67°W	SD5666
Claughton (Claughton on Brock)	Lancashire	53.87°N 02.73°W	SD5242
Claughton	Wirral	53.38°N 03.05°W	SJ3088

==== Clav-Clax ====
Location	Locality	Coordinates (links to map & photo sources)	OS grid reference
Clavelshay	Somerset	51.07°N 03.07°W	ST2531
Claverdon	Warwickshire	52.27°N 01.72°W	SP1964
Claverham	North Somerset	51.39°N 02.80°W	ST4466
Claverhambury	Essex	51.70°N 00.02°E	TL4003
Clavering	Essex	51.95°N 00.13°E	TL4731
Claverley	Shropshire	52.53°N 02.31°W	SO7993
Claverton	Bath and North East Somerset	51.37°N 02.31°W	ST7864
Claverton Down	Bath and North East Somerset	51.36°N 02.33°W	ST7763
Clawdd Coch	The Vale Of Glamorgan	51.48°N 03.36°W	ST0577
Clawdd-newydd	Denbighshire	53.05°N 03.37°W	SJ0852
Clawdd Poncen	Denbighshire	52.98°N 03.38°W	SJ0744
Clawthorpe	Cumbria	54.18°N 02.72°W	SD5377
Clawton	Devon	50.76°N 04.34°W	SX3599
Claxby (by Normanby)	Lincolnshire	53.43°N 00.33°W	TF1194
Claxby (St Andrew)	Lincolnshire	53.21°N 00.17°E	TF4571
Claxton	Norfolk	52.57°N 01.43°E	TG3303
Claxton	North Yorkshire	54.03°N 00.94°W	SE6960

==== Clay ====
Location	Locality	Coordinates (links to map & photo sources)	OS grid reference
Claybrooke Magna	Leicestershire	52.48°N 01.27°W	SP4988
Claybrooke Parva	Leicestershire	52.47°N 01.27°W	SP4987
Clay Common	Suffolk	52.37°N 01.62°E	TM4781
Clay Coton	Northamptonshire	52.38°N 01.13°W	SP5977
Clay Cross	Derbyshire	53.16°N 01.41°W	SK3963
Claydon	Warwickshire	52.14°N 01.34°W	SP4550
Claydon	Suffolk	52.09°N 01.10°E	TM1349
Claydon	Gloucestershire	51.97°N 02.10°W	SO9331
Clay End	Hertfordshire	51.90°N 00.11°W	TL3025
Claygate (Collier Street)	Kent	51.16°N 00.44°E	TQ7144
Claygate (Shipbourne)	Kent	51.23°N 00.29°E	TQ6051
Claygate	Surrey	51.35°N 00.33°W	TQ1663
Claygate	Dumfries and Galloway	55.10°N 02.95°W	NY3979
Claygate Cross	Kent	51.27°N 00.30°E	TQ6155
Clayhall	Hampshire	50.77°N 01.13°W	SZ6198
Clayhall	Redbridge	51.59°N 00.04°E	TQ4290
Clayhanger	Devon	50.98°N 03.39°W	ST0222
Clayhanger	Somerset	50.89°N 02.98°W	ST3111
Clayhanger	Walsall	52.63°N 01.94°W	SK0404
Clay Head	Isle of Man	54.19°N 04.39°W	SC439804
Clayhidon	Devon	50.92°N 03.19°W	ST1615
Clayhill	East Sussex	50.97°N 00.61°E	TQ8423
Clayhill	Hampshire	50.86°N 01.57°W	SU3007
Clay Hill	Berkshire	51.42°N 01.18°W	SU5770
Clay Hill	City of Bristol	51.46°N 02.54°W	ST6274
Clay Hill	Enfield	51.66°N 00.09°W	TQ3298
Clayhithe	Cambridgeshire	52.25°N 00.19°E	TL5064
Clayholes	Angus	56.50°N 02.73°W	NO5535
Clay Lake	Lincolnshire	52.77°N 00.16°W	TF2421
Clayland	Stirling	56.05°N 04.33°W	NS5587
Clay Mills	Staffordshire	52.84°N 01.61°W	SK2627
Claypit Hill	Cambridgeshire	52.16°N 00.02°W	TL3554
Claypits	Gloucestershire	51.74°N 02.34°W	SO7605
Claypits	Kent	51.24°N 01.22°E	TR2555
Claypits	Suffolk	52.40°N 00.51°E	TL7181
Claypole	Lincolnshire	53.03°N 00.73°W	SK8549
Clays End	Bath and North East Somerset	51.37°N 02.43°W	ST7064
Claythorpe	Lincolnshire	53.28°N 00.11°E	TF4179
Clayton	Bradford	53.77°N 01.81°W	SE1231
Clayton	Doncaster	53.55°N 01.32°W	SE4507
Clayton	Fife	56.35°N 02.92°W	NO4318
Clayton	Manchester	53.47°N 02.18°W	SJ8898
Clayton	Staffordshire	52.98°N 02.22°W	SJ8543
Clayton	West Sussex	50.91°N 00.15°W	TQ3014
Clayton Brook	Lancashire	53.71°N 02.65°W	SD5724
Clayton Green	Lancashire	53.70°N 02.65°W	SD5723
Clayton Heights	Bradford	53.76°N 01.83°W	SE1130
Clayton-le-Dale	Lancashire	53.79°N 02.50°W	SD6733
Clayton-Le-Moors	Lancashire	53.77°N 02.39°W	SD7431
Clayton-le-Woods	Lancashire	53.69°N 02.66°W	SD5622
Clayton West	Kirklees	53.58°N 01.62°W	SE2510
Clayworth	Nottinghamshire	53.38°N 00.91°W	SK7288

=== Cle ===
Location	Locality	Coordinates (links to map & photo sources)	OS grid reference
Cleadale	Highland	56.91°N 06.15°W	NM4788
Cleadon	South Tyneside	54.95°N 01.40°W	NZ3862
Cleadon Park	South Tyneside	54.96°N 01.40°W	NZ3863
Clearbrook	Devon	50.46°N 04.08°W	SX5265
Clearwell	Gloucestershire	51.77°N 2.62°W	SO5708
Clearwell	City of Newport	51.56°N 03.08°W	ST2585
Clearwood	Wiltshire	51.24°N 02.24°W	ST8349
Cleasby	North Yorkshire	54.51°N 01.61°W	NZ2513
Cleat	Orkney Islands	58.74°N 02.95°W	ND4584
Cleat	Western Isles	57.00°N 07.50°W	NF6604
Cleatlam	Durham	54.55°N 01.83°W	NZ1118
Cleator	Cumbria	54.50°N 03.53°W	NY0113
Cleator Moor	Cumbria	54.51°N 03.51°W	NY0214
Cleave	Devon	50.79°N 03.13°W	ST2000
Cleckheaton	Kirklees	53.72°N 01.72°W	SE1825
Cleddon	Monmouthshire	51.72°N 02.71°W	SO5103
Cleedownton	Shropshire	52.41°N 02.61°W	SO5880
Cleehill	Shropshire	52.37°N 02.60°W	SO5975
Cleekhimin	North Lanarkshire	55.79°N 03.96°W	NS7757
Cleemarsh	Shropshire	52.45°N 02.64°W	SO5684
Cleestanton	Shropshire	52.40°N 02.63°W	SO5779
Clee St Margaret	Shropshire	52.45°N 02.64°W	SO5684
Cleethorpes	North East Lincolnshire	53.55°N 00.03°W	TA3008
Cleeton St Mary	Shropshire	52.39°N 02.57°W	SO6178
Cleeve	Gloucestershire	51.80°N 02.40°W	SO7212
Cleeve	Oxfordshire	51.52°N 01.13°W	SU6081
Cleeve	North Somerset	51.39°N 02.77°W	ST4666
Cleeve Hill	Gloucestershire	51.93°N 02.03°W	SO9826
Cleeve Prior	Worcestershire	52.13°N 01.88°W	SP0849
Cleghorn	South Lanarkshire	55.68°N 03.75°W	NS9045
Clehonger	Herefordshire	52.02°N 02.80°W	SO4537
Cleigh	Argyll and Bute	56.36°N 05.45°W	NM8725
Cleish	Perth and Kinross	56.16°N 03.46°W	NT0998
Cleland	North Lanarkshire	55.80°N 03.93°W	NS7958
Clements End	Gloucestershire	51.76°N 02.61°W	SO5807
Clement's End	Bedfordshire	51.82°N 00.52°W	TL0215
Clement Street	Kent	51.40°N 00.19°E	TQ5370
Clench	Wiltshire	51.35°N 01.74°W	SU1862
Clench Common	Wiltshire	51.38°N 01.75°W	SU1765
Clencher's Mill	Herefordshire	52.01°N 02.39°W	SO7335
Clenchwarton	Norfolk	52.75°N 00.35°E	TF5920
Clennell	Northumberland	55.35°N 02.12°W	NT9207
Clent	Worcestershire	52.40°N 02.11°W	SO9279
Cleobury Mortimer	Shropshire	52.37°N 02.48°W	SO6775
Cleobury North	Shropshire	52.47°N 02.56°W	SO6286
Clephanton	Highland	57.52°N 03.98°W	NH8150
Clerkenwater	Cornwall	50.47°N 04.73°W	SX0668
Clerkenwell	Camden	51.52°N 00.11°W	TQ3182
Clerk Green	Kirklees	53.70°N 01.65°W	SE2323
Clerkhill	Aberdeenshire	57.49°N 01.80°W	NK1245
Clerklands	Scottish Borders	55.50°N 02.79°W	NT5024
Clermiston	City of Edinburgh	55.95°N 03.29°W	NT1974
Cleuch Head	Scottish Borders	55.38°N 02.64°W	NT5910
Clevancy	Wiltshire	51.47°N 01.92°W	SU0575
Clevans	Renfrewshire	55.85°N 04.60°W	NS3765
Clevedon	North Somerset	51.43°N 02.87°W	ST3971
Cleveley	Oxfordshire	51.91°N 01.44°W	SP3824
Cleveleys	Lancashire	53.87°N 03.05°W	SD3143
Cleverton	Wiltshire	51.56°N 02.04°W	ST9785
Clewer	Somerset	51.25°N 02.80°W	ST4451
Clewer Green	Berkshire	51.46°N 00.64°W	SU9475
Clewer New Town	Berkshire	51.47°N 00.63°W	SU9576
Clewer Village	Berkshire	51.48°N 00.63°W	SU9577
Cley next the Sea	Norfolk	52.94°N 01.03°E	TG0443

=== Cli ===
Location	Locality	Coordinates (links to map & photo sources)	OS grid reference
Cliasay More	Western Isles	57.61°N 07.14°W	NF929701
Clibberswick	Shetland Islands	60.78°N 00.82°W	HP6412
Cliburn	Cumbria	54.60°N 02.65°W	NY5824
Cliddesden	Hampshire	51.23°N 01.09°W	SU6349
Cliff	Derbyshire	53.38°N 01.97°W	SK0287
Cliff	Highland	56.75°N 05.81°W	NM6769
Cliff	Warwickshire	52.57°N 01.70°W	SP2098
Cliff	Western Isles	58.20°N 06.97°W	NB0835
Cliffburn	Angus	56.56°N 02.57°W	NO6541
Cliffe	Lancashire	53.78°N 02.42°W	SD7232
Cliffe (Richmondshire)	North Yorkshire	54.53°N 01.67°W	NZ2115
Cliffe (Selby)	North Yorkshire	53.78°N 00.99°W	SE6632
Cliffe	Kent	51.45°N 00.48°E	TQ7376
Cliff End	East Sussex	50.88°N 00.67°E	TQ8813
Cliff End	Kirklees	53.64°N 01.81°W	SE1216
Cliffe Woods	Kent	51.42°N 00.48°E	TQ7373
Clifford	Devon	50.96°N 04.42°W	SS3021
Clifford	Herefordshire	52.09°N 03.11°W	SO2445
Clifford	Leeds	53.89°N 01.36°W	SE4244
Clifford Chambers	Warwickshire	52.16°N 01.72°W	SP1952
Cliffords Mesne	Gloucestershire	51.90°N 02.43°W	SO7023
Cliffs End	Kent	51.32°N 01.35°E	TR3464
Clifftown	Essex	51.53°N 00.69°E	TQ8785
Clifton	Bedfordshire	52.02°N 00.31°W	TL1638
Clifton	Calderdale	53.69°N 01.77°W	SE1522
Clifton	Cheshire	53.30°N 02.72°W	SJ5279
Clifton	Cumbria	54.62°N 02.72°W	NY5326
Clifton	Derbyshire	53.00°N 01.75°W	SK1644
Clifton	Devon	51.15°N 04.01°W	SS5941
Clifton	Doncaster	53.45°N 01.23°W	SK5196
Clifton	Worcestershire	52.11°N 02.23°W	SO8446
Clifton	Lancashire	53.76°N 02.82°W	SD4630
Clifton	Bristol	51.45°N 02.63°W	ST5673
Clifton	North Yorkshire	53.92°N 01.71°W	SE1948
Clifton	Northumberland	55.13°N 01.68°W	NZ2082
Clifton	Nottinghamshire	52.90°N 01.18°W	SK5534
Clifton	Oxfordshire	51.97°N 01.30°W	SP4831
Clifton	Rotherham	53.42°N 01.35°W	SK4392
Clifton	Salford	53.52°N 02.34°W	SD7703
Clifton	Stirling	56.43°N 04.72°W	NN3230
Clifton	York	53.97°N 01.10°W	SE5953
Clifton Campville	Staffordshire	52.68°N 01.63°W	SK2510
Clifton Green	Salford	53.51°N 02.33°W	SD7802
Clifton Hampden	Oxfordshire	51.65°N 01.22°W	SU5495
Clifton Junction	Salford	53.52°N 02.31°W	SD7903
Clifton Maybank	Dorset	50.91°N 02.61°W	ST5713
Clifton Reynes	Milton Keynes	52.15°N 00.68°W	SP9051
Clifton upon Dunsmore	Warwickshire	52.37°N 01.22°W	SP5376
Clifton upon Teme	Worcestershire	52.24°N 02.42°W	SO7161
Cliftonville	Kent	51.38°N 01.39°E	TR3671
Cliftonville	Norfolk	52.88°N 01.41°E	TG3037
Cliftonville	North Lanarkshire	55.86°N 04.01°W	NS7465
Climping	West Sussex	50.80°N 00.59°W	SU9902
Clinkham Wood	St Helens	53.47°N 02.73°W	SJ5198
Clint	North Yorkshire	54.02°N 01.61°W	SE2559
Clint Green	Norfolk	52.65°N 00.98°E	TG0211
Clints	North Yorkshire	54.39°N 01.84°W	NZ1000
Clipiau	Powys	52.67°N 03.71°W	SH8410
Clippesby	Norfolk	52.66°N 01.57°E	TG4214
Clippings Green	Norfolk	52.66°N 01.01°E	TG0412
Clipsham	Rutland	52.73°N 00.57°W	SK9616
Clipston	Northamptonshire	52.42°N 00.95°W	SP7181
Clipston	Nottinghamshire	52.90°N 01.06°W	SK6334
Clipstone	Bedfordshire	51.92°N 00.63°W	SP9426
Clipstone	Nottinghamshire	53.16°N 01.13°W	SK5863
Clitheroe	Lancashire	53.86°N 02.39°W	SD7441
Cliton Manor	Bedfordshire	52.03°N 00.31°W	TL1639
Cliuthar	Western Isles	57.80°N 06.81°W	NG1490
Clive	Cheshire	53.19°N 02.49°W	SJ6766
Clive	Shropshire	52.81°N 02.72°W	SJ5124
Clive Green	Cheshire	53.18°N 02.49°W	SJ6765
Clive Vale	East Sussex	50.86°N 00.59°E	TQ8310
Clivocast	Shetland Islands	60.67°N 00.90°W	HP6000
Clixby	Lincolnshire	53.52°N 00.34°W	TA1004

=== Clo ===
Location	Locality	Coordinates (links to map & photo sources)	OS grid reference
Cloatley	Wiltshire	51.60°N 02.03°W	ST9890
Cloatley End	Wiltshire	51.60°N 02.01°W	ST9990
Clocaenog	Denbighshire	53.07°N 03.37°W	SJ0854
Clochan	Moray	57.62°N 03.00°W	NJ4060
Clock Face	St Helens	53.41°N 02.72°W	SJ5291
Clock House	Sutton	51.32°N 00.16°W	TQ2860
Clock Mills	Herefordshire	52.09°N 03.03°W	SO2945
Cloddiau	Powys	52.67°N 03.18°W	SJ2009
Cloddymoss	Moray	57.61°N 03.70°W	NH9860
Clodock	Herefordshire	51.93°N 02.99°W	SO3227
Cloford	Somerset	51.18°N 02.40°W	ST7243
Cloford Common	Somerset	51.18°N 02.40°W	ST7243
Cloigyn	Carmarthenshire	51.80°N 04.27°W	SN4314
Clola	Aberdeenshire	57.47°N 02.00°W	NK0043
Clophill	Bedfordshire	52.02°N 00.42°W	TL0837
Clopton	Northamptonshire	52.40°N 00.44°W	TL0680
Clopton Corner	Suffolk	52.13°N 01.24°E	TM2254
Clopton Green (Rattlesden)	Suffolk	52.20°N 00.88°E	TL9760
Clopton Green (Wickhambrook)	Suffolk	52.15°N 00.57°E	TL7654
Closeburn	Dumfries and Galloway	55.21°N 03.74°W	NX8992
Close House	Durham	54.63°N 01.64°W	NZ2327
Closworth	Somerset	50.88°N 02.62°W	ST5610
Clothall	Hertfordshire	51.96°N 00.15°W	TL2731
Clothall Common	Hertfordshire	51.98°N 00.18°W	TL2533
Clotherholme	North Yorkshire	54.14°N 01.54°W	SE2872
Clotton	Cheshire	53.16°N 02.71°W	SJ5263
Clotton Common	Cheshire	53.17°N 02.71°W	SJ5264
Cloudesley Bush	Warwickshire	52.47°N 01.32°W	SP4686
Clouds	Herefordshire	52.03°N 02.61°W	SO5838
Cloud Side	Staffordshire	53.15°N 02.13°W	SJ9162
Clough	Kirklees	53.61°N 01.86°W	SE0913
Clough	Oldham	53.56°N 02.09°W	SD9408
Clough	Rochdale	53.64°N 02.10°W	SD9317
Clough Dene	Durham	54.88°N 01.73°W	NZ1755
Cloughfold	Lancashire	53.69°N 02.28°W	SD8122
Clough Foot	Calderdale	53.70°N 02.15°W	SD9023
Clough Hall	Staffordshire	53.07°N 02.25°W	SJ8353
Clough Head	Calderdale	53.69°N 01.91°W	SE0622
Clough Head	Kirklees	53.63°N 01.88°W	SE0815
Cloughton	North Yorkshire	54.33°N 00.46°W	TA0094
Cloughton Newlands	North Yorkshire	54.34°N 00.44°W	TA0195
Clousta	Shetland Islands	60.29°N 01.45°W	HU3057
Clouston	Orkney Islands	58.98°N 03.21°W	HY3011
Clova	Angus	56.84°N 03.11°W	NO3273
Clovelly	Devon	50.99°N 04.40°W	SS3124
Clovenfords	Scottish Borders	55.61°N 02.89°W	NT4436
Clovenstone	Aberdeenshire	57.24°N 02.38°W	NJ7717
Clovullin	Highland	56.71°N 05.27°W	NN0063
Clowance Wood	Cornwall	50.15°N 05.33°W	SW6234
Clow Bridge	Lancashire	53.74°N 02.27°W	SD8228
Clowne	Derbyshire	53.27°N 01.26°W	SK4975
Clows Top	Worcestershire	52.33°N 02.42°W	SO7171
Cloy	Wrexham	52.98°N 02.91°W	SJ3943

=== Clu ===
Location	Locality	Coordinates (links to map & photo sources)	OS grid reference
Clubmoor	Liverpool	53.43°N 02.93°W	SJ3893
Clubworthy	Cornwall	50.70°N 04.45°W	SX2792
Cluddley	Shropshire	52.68°N 02.54°W	SJ6310
Clun	Shropshire	52.41°N 03.03°W	SO3080
Clunbury	Shropshire	52.41°N 02.92°W	SO3780
Clunderwen / Clynderwen	Pembrokeshire	51.83°N 04.73°W	SN1219
Clune	Highland	57.30°N 04.00°W	NH7925
Clunes	Highland	56.94°N 04.96°W	NN2088
Clungunford	Shropshire	52.39°N 02.89°W	SO3978
Clunie	Perth and Kinross	56.57°N 03.46°W	NO1043
Clunton	Shropshire	52.42°N 02.98°W	SO3381
Cluny	Fife	56.14°N 03.22°W	NT2495
Clutton	Cheshire	53.08°N 02.80°W	SJ4654
Clutton	Bath and North East Somerset	51.32°N 02.54°W	ST6259
Clutton Hill	Bath and North East Somerset	51.32°N 02.53°W	ST6359

=== Clw ===
Location	Locality	Coordinates (links to map & photo sources)	OS grid reference
Clwt-y-bont	Gwynedd	53.13°N 04.13°W	SH5762
Clwydyfagwyr	Merthyr Tydfil	51.74°N 03.42°W	SO0206

=== Cly ===
Location	Locality	Coordinates (links to map & photo sources)	OS grid reference
Clydach	Monmouthshire	51.81°N 03.13°W	SO2213
Clydach	Swansea	51.69°N 03.91°W	SN6801
Clydach Terrace	Blaenau Gwent	51.80°N 03.19°W	SO1813
Clydach Vale	Rhondda, Cynon, Taff	51.62°N 03.48°W	SS9793
Clydebank	West Dunbartonshire	55.89°N 04.41°W	NS4970
Clyffe Pypard	Wiltshire	51.48°N 01.90°W	SU0776
Clynder	Argyll and Bute	56.01°N 04.82°W	NS2484
Clyne	Neath Port Talbot	51.68°N 03.73°W	SN8000
Clynnog Fawr	Gwynedd	53.01°N 04.37°W	SH4149
Clyro	Powys	52.07°N 03.15°W	SO2143
Clyst Honiton	Devon	50.72°N 03.44°W	SX9893
Clyst Hydon	Devon	50.80°N 03.37°W	ST0301
Clyst St George	Devon	50.68°N 03.44°W	SX9888
Clyst St Lawrence	Devon	50.79°N 03.39°W	ST0200
Clyst St Mary	Devon	50.70°N 03.46°W	SX9791

== Cn ==
Location	Locality	Coordinates (links to map & photo sources)	OS grid reference
Cnoc Amhlaigh	Western Isles	58.24°N 06.17°W	NB5536
Cnoc an t-Solais	Western Isles	58.27°N 06.31°W	NB4740
Cnoc Ard / Knockaird	Western Isles	58.49°N 06.24°W	NB5364
Cnocbreac	Argyll and Bute	55.88°N 06.09°W	NR4473
Cnoc Mairi	Western Isles	58.21°N 06.42°W	NB4034
Cnoc nan Gobhar / Goat Hill	Western Isles	58.21°N 06.37°W	NB4333
Cnwch Coch	Ceredigion	52.35°N 03.95°W	SN6775
