= Cloy =

Cloy or CLOY may refer to:

- Cloy, County Fermanagh, a townland in Ireland
- Cloy, Wrexham, a location in Wales
- Crash Landing on You (CLOY), a South Korean TV drama series
- George Cloy, Scottish footballer
- Cloy Mattox, baseball player
