= Clifton Junction =

Clifton Junction may refer to:

- Clifton Junction, Greater Manchester, a location in England
- Clifton railway station (Greater Manchester), England, formerly called Clifton Junction
- Clifton Junction, Tennessee, an unincorporated community located in Wayne County, Tennessee, United States
