= Women's Land Army =

British civilian organisation

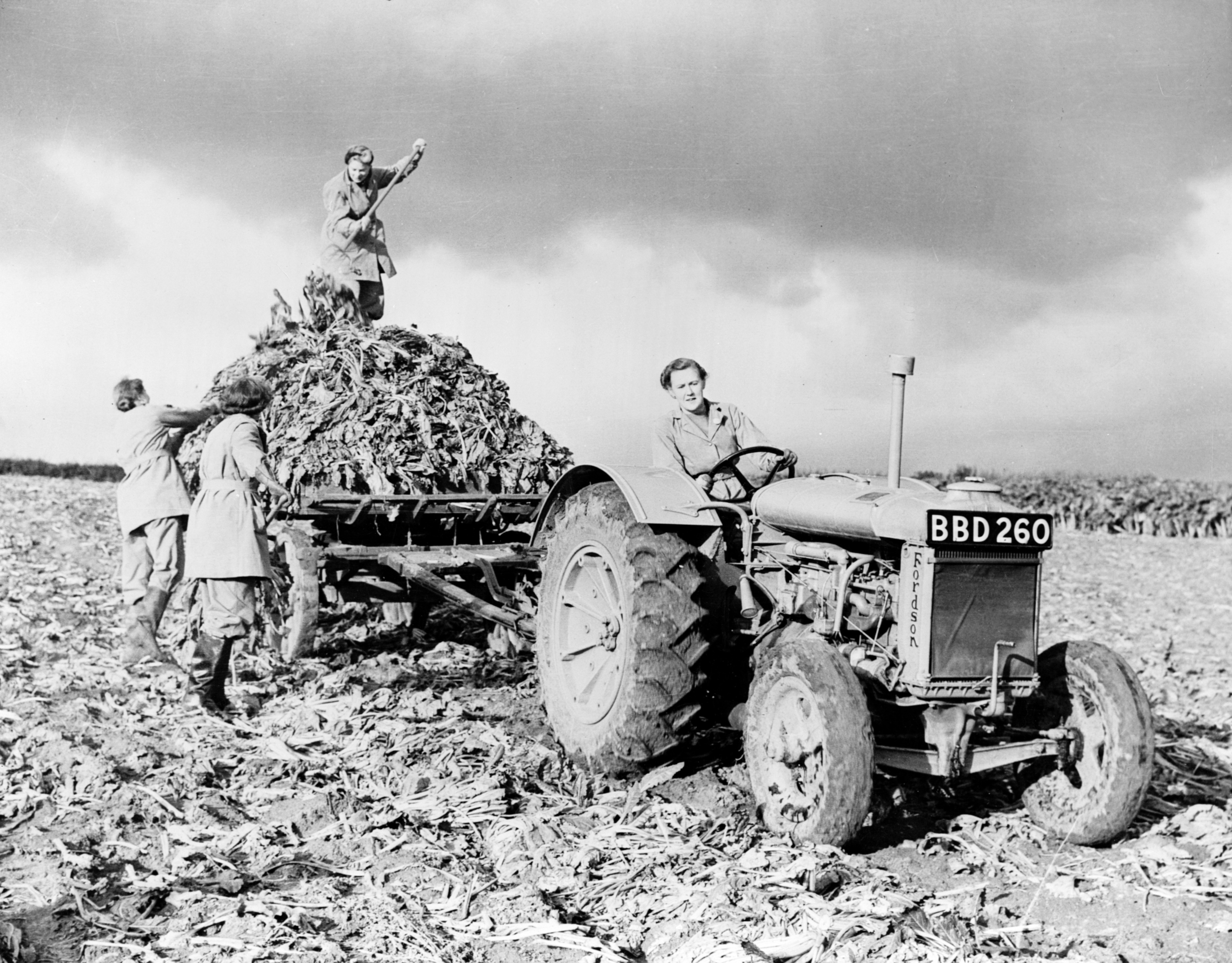
Members of the British Women's Land Army harvesting beetroot (1942/43)

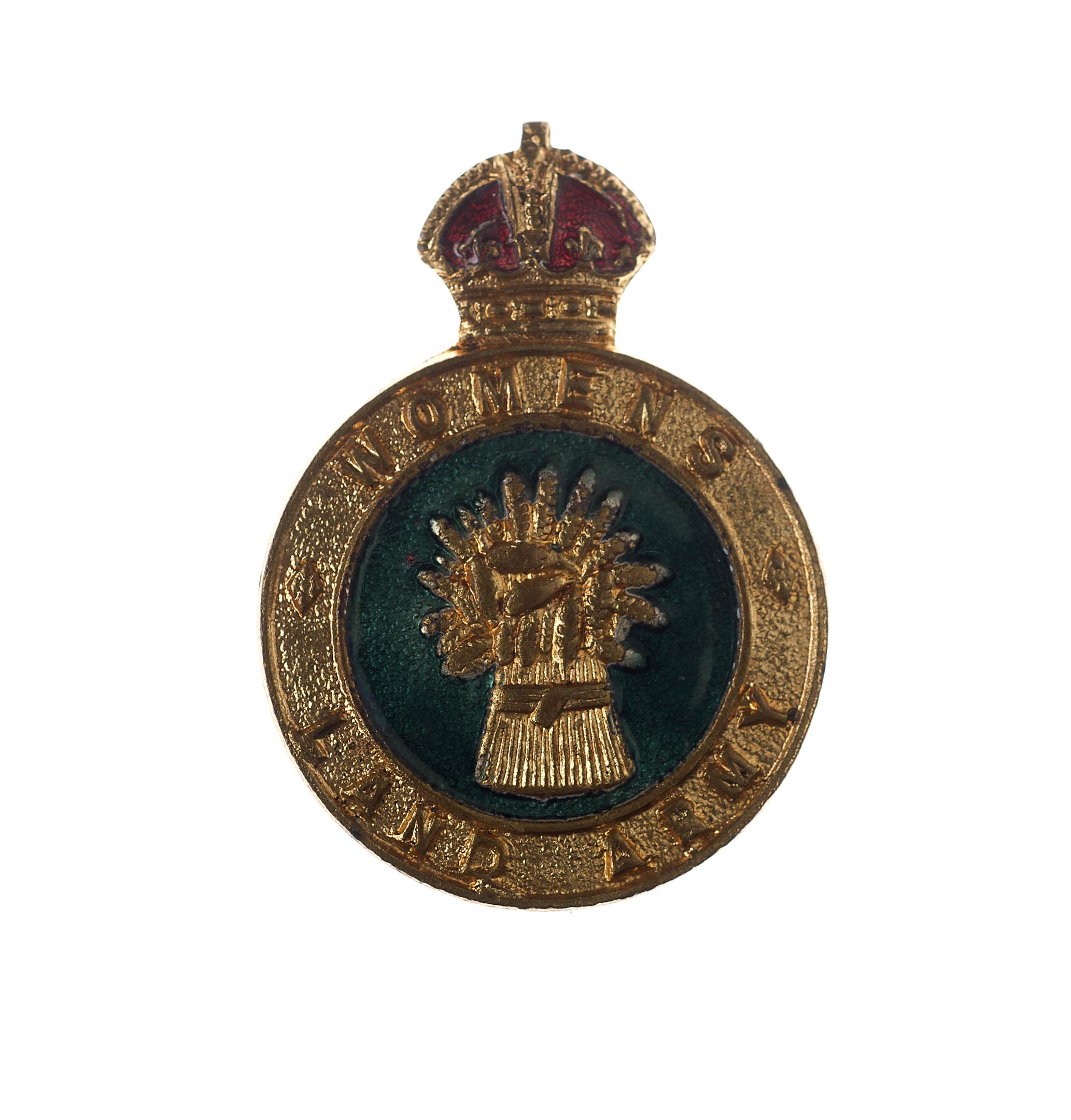
Women's Land Army Badge

The Women's Land Army (WLA) was a British civilian organisation created in 1917 by the Board of Agriculture during the First World War to bring women into work in agriculture, replacing men conscripted into the military. Women who worked for the WLA were commonly known as Land Girls (Land Lassies). The Land Army placed women with farms that needed workers, the farmers being their employers. The members picked crops and did all the labour to feed the country. Notable members include Joan Quennell, later a Member of Parliament; John Stewart Collis, Irish author and pioneer ecologist; the archaeologist Lily Chitty and the botanist Ethel Thomas. It was disbanded in 1919 but revived in June 1939 under the same name to again organise new workers to replace workers that served in the military during the Second World War. It was finally disbanded in 1950.

== History ==
=== First World War ===
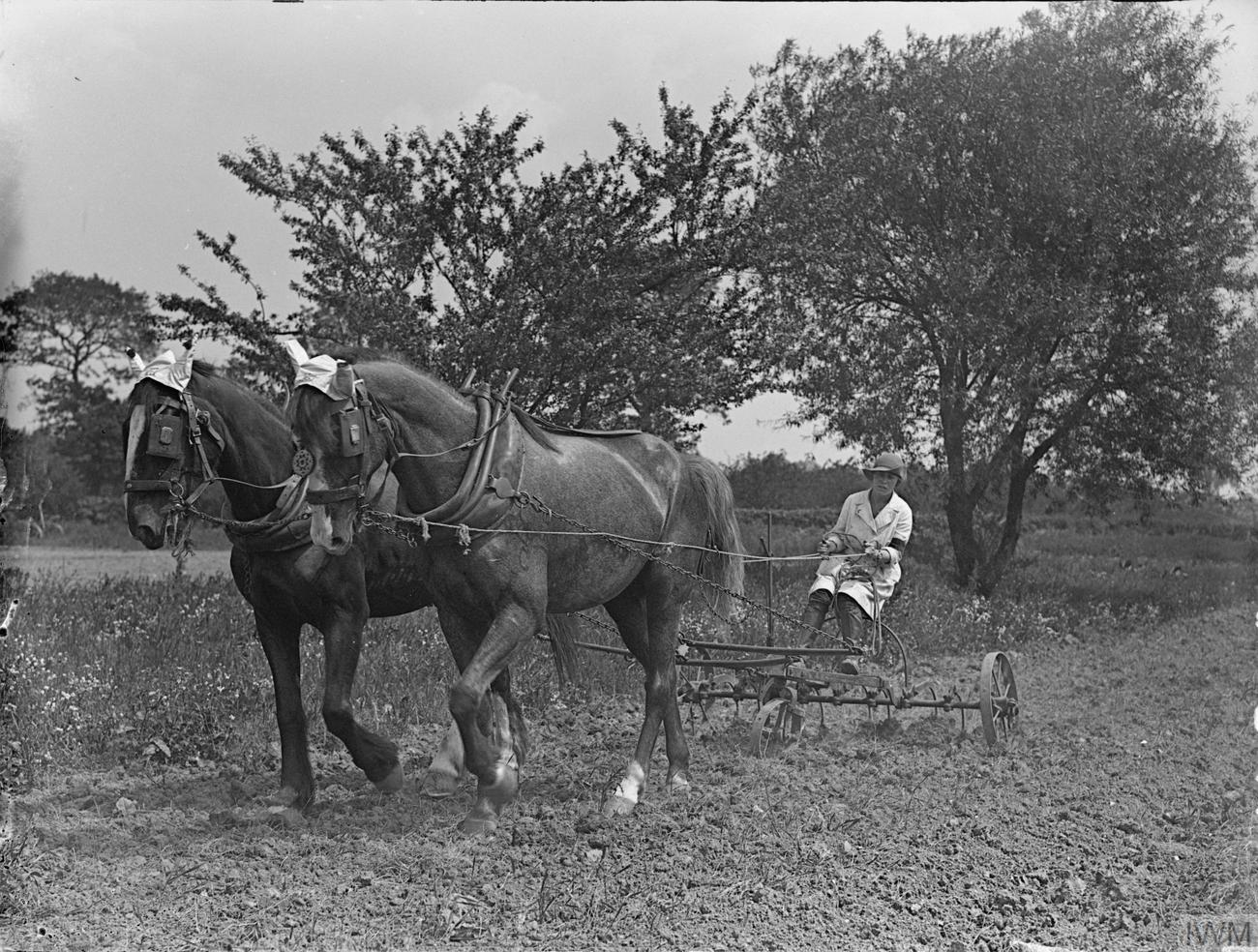
Working on a potato crop during the First World War

The Women's Farm and Garden Union had existed since 1899 and in February 1916 they sent a deputation to meet Lord Selborne. Selborne's Ministry of Agriculture agreed to fund a Women’s National Land Service Corps with a grant of £150. Louise Wilkins was to lead the new organisation that was to focus on recruiting women for emergency war work. They were tasked with improving recruitment and provide propaganda about the good cause of women of all classes undertaking agricultural work. The new members of the organisation were to not become agricultural workers but to organise others (e.g. in villages) to do this work. By the end of 1916 they had recruited 2,000 volunteers but they estimated that 40,000 was required. At the Women’s National Land Service Corps's suggestion a Land Army was formed. The WNLSC continued to deal with recruitment and the network assisted in the launch of a "Land Army"; by April 1917 they had over 500 replies and 88 joined the new Land Army where they became group leaders and supervisors.

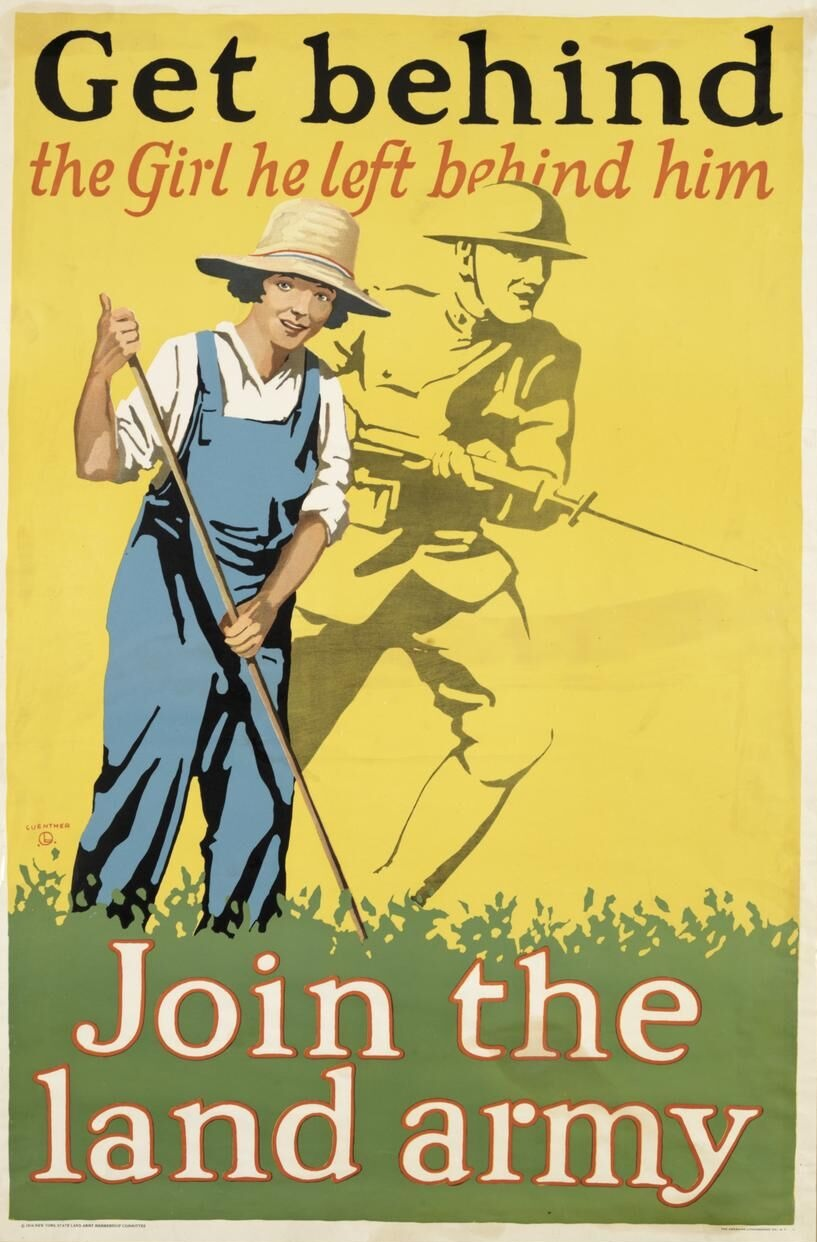
First World War poster

In time the Land Army would take on 23,000 workers who took the place of the 100,000 workers lost to the forces. The women were paid 18 shillings a week and this could be increased to 20 shillings (a pound) if they were considered efficient. 23,000 was a significant contribution but there were estimated to be 300,000 women working on the land during the First World War.

A Good Service Ribbon was awarded to eligible women. January 1918 saw the publication of the first issue of The Landswoman, the official monthly magazine of the Women’s Land Army and the Women’s Institutes. The organisation was disbanded in November 1919.

=== Second World War ===
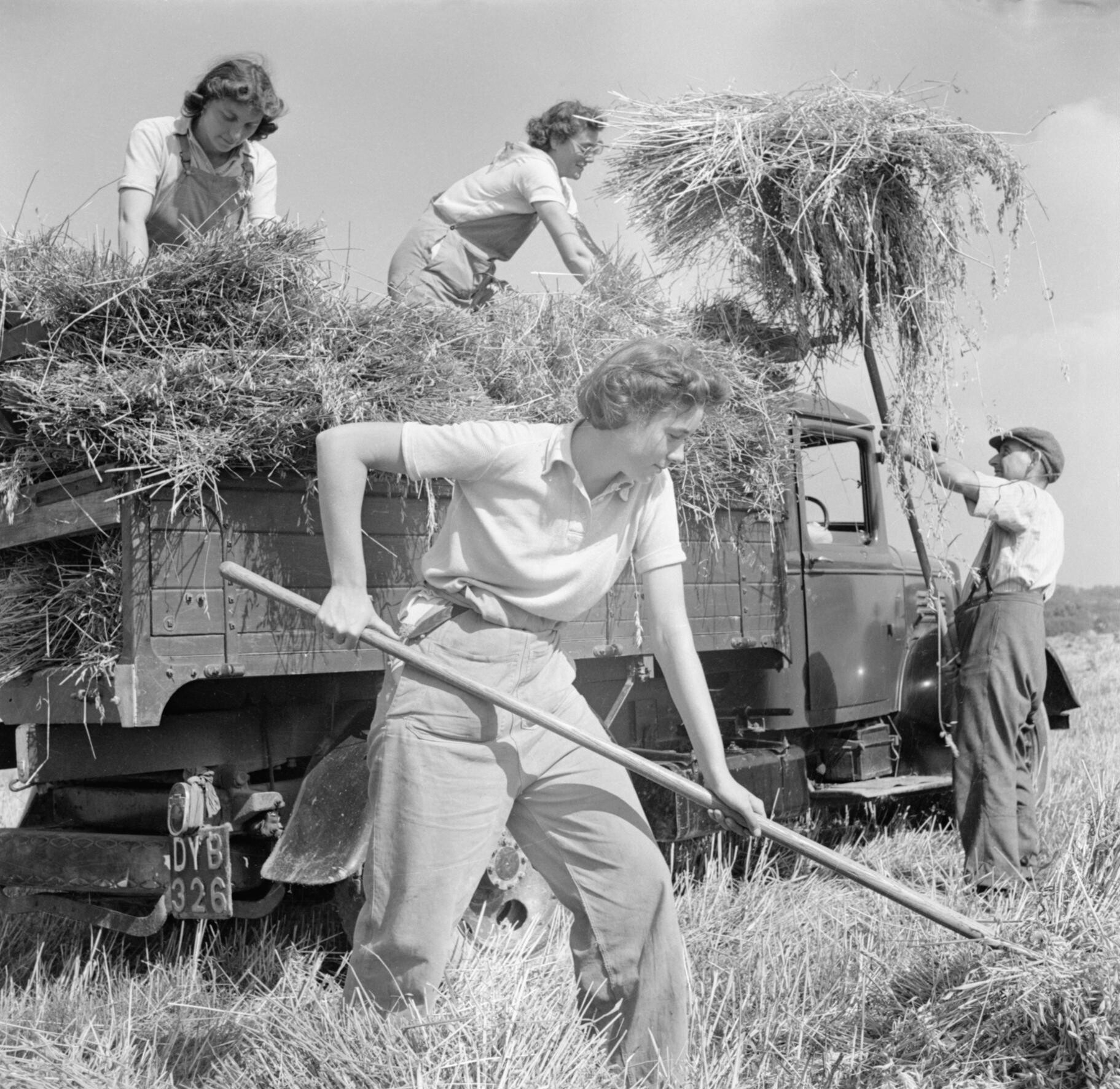
Harvesting at Mount Barton, Devon, 1942

As the prospect of war became increasingly likely, the government wanted to increase the amount of food grown within Britain. In April 1939, peacetime conscription was introduced for the first time in British history, which led to shortages of workers on the farms. To grow more food, more help was needed on the farms and so the government restarted the Women's Land Army in July 1939. Though under the Ministry of Agriculture and Fisheries, it was given an honorary head – Lady Denman. At first it asked for volunteers. This was supplemented by conscription, so that by 1944 it had over 80,000 members.

Inez Jenkins, who had served as Lady Denman's assistant director during the establishment of the WLA served as Chief Administrative Officer until 1948. The last Chief of the WLA was Amy Curtis. The WLA lasted until its official disbandment on 30 November 1950.

The majority of the Land Girls already lived in the countryside, but more than a third came from London and the industrial cities of the north of England. A separate branch was set up in 1942 for forestry industry work, officially known as the Women's Timber Corps and with its members colloquially known as "Lumber Jills" – this was disbanded in 1946.

In 1943, during the Second World War, Amelia King was refused work because she was black. The decision was overturned after being raised in the House of Commons by her MP, Walter Edwards.

A magazine for WLA members, The Land Girl was first published in April 1940. Originally unofficial, it was funded by the Ministry of Agriculture once its popularity was established. The final issue was published in March 1947.

=== Commemoration ===
In October 2012, the then Charles, Prince of Wales unveiled the first memorial to the WLA of both World Wars in Clochan, Moray. The sculpture was designed by Peter Naylor. In October 2014, a memorial statue to the Women's Timber Corps and both incarnations of the Women's Land Army was unveiled at the National Memorial Arboretum in Staffordshire, England.

== Recognition ==
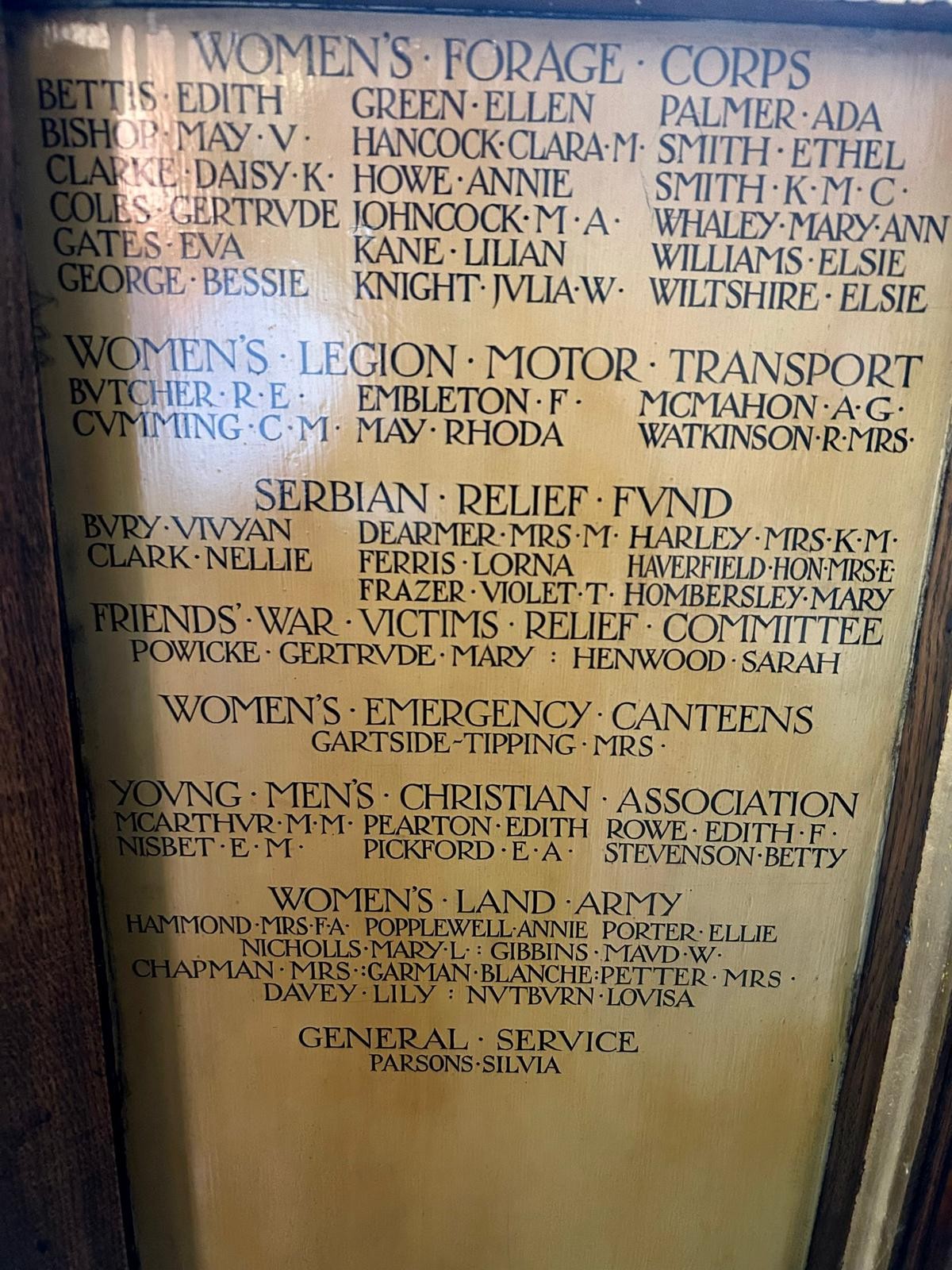
Oak panel from York Minster's Five Sisters window memorial including ten Women's Land Army who died in the line of service

In 1925 the Five Sisters window at York Minster was rededicated to the 1,513 women who died in the line of service during WWI, including ten women from the Land Army.

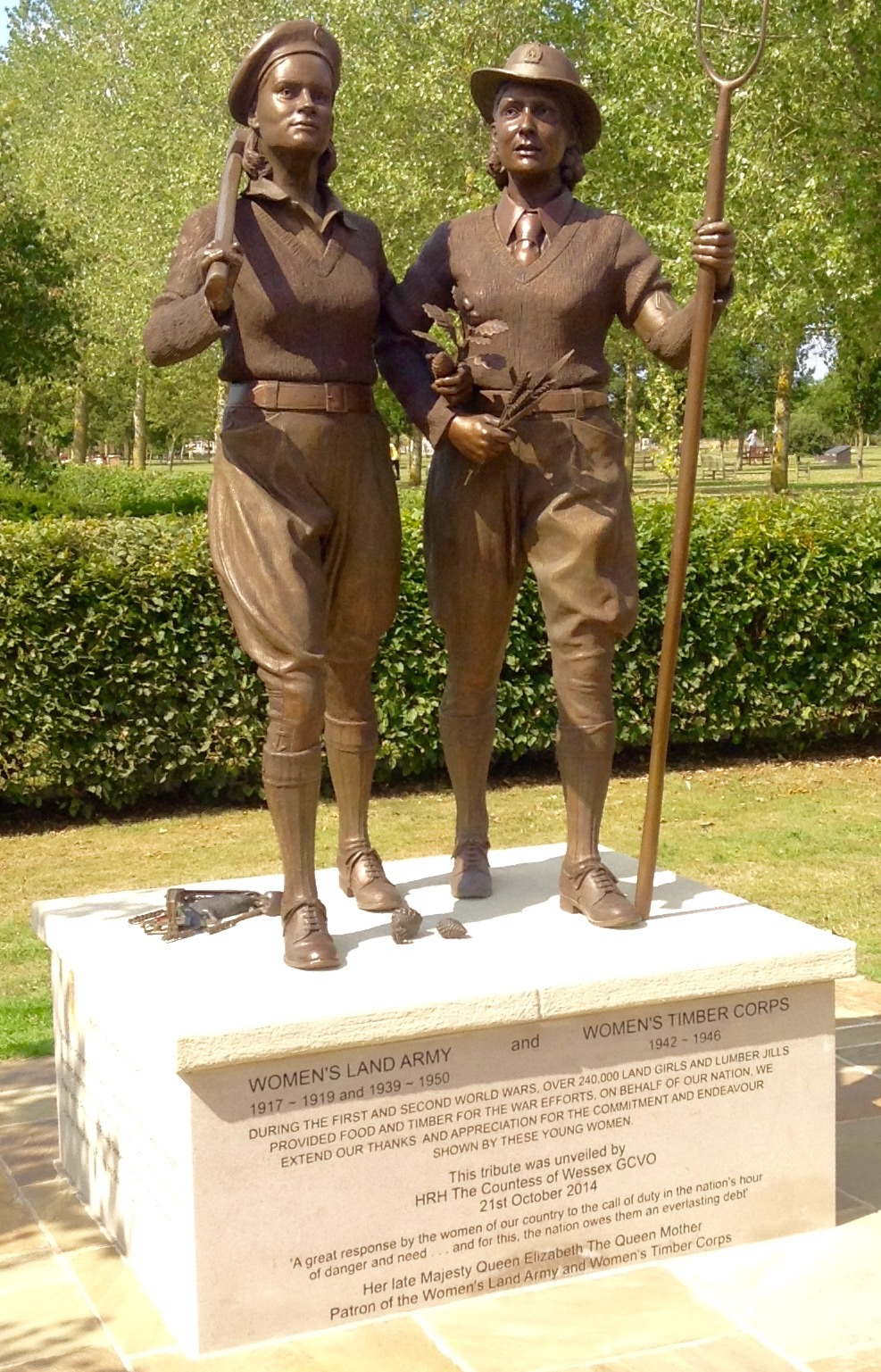
Statue at the National Memorial Arboretum, Alrewas, Staffordshire

In December 2007, following campaigning by former Land Girl Hilda Gibson, the Department for Environment, Food and Rural Affairs (DEFRA) announced that the efforts of the Women's Land Army and the Women's Timber Corps would be formally recognised with the presentation of a specially designed commemorative badge to the surviving members. The badge of honour was awarded in July 2008 to over 45,000 former Land Girls.

In October 2012, the Prince of Wales unveiled the first memorial to the WLA of both World Wars, on the Fochabers estate in Moray, Scotland. The sculpture was designed by Peter Naylor. In October 2014, a memorial statue to the Women's Timber Corps and both incarnations of the Women's Land Army was unveiled at the National Memorial Arboretum in Staffordshire, England.

== In popular culture ==
The Women's Land Army was the subject of:

- The Land Girls (1998), a film loosely based on Angela Huth's book Land Girls (1995)
- The ITV sitcom Backs to the Land (1977–78)
- The BBC dramatic TV series Land Girls (2009–11)
- The Powell and Pressburger 1944 film A Canterbury Tale features as the female lead a Land Girl, portrayed by Sheila Sim.
- The play Lilies of the Land (2010) by theatre company The Lions Part.

It also figured largely in:

- Series 3, Episode 3 (2004) of the ITV detective series Foyle's War, entitled "They Fought in the Fields".
- In the 2002 detective novel A Presumption of Death by Jill Paton Walsh and Dorothy L. Sayers, the plot centres on Harriet Vane and Lord Peter Wimsey trying to solve the murder of a land girl in Hertfordshire.
- The Play For Today episode Rainy Day Women.
- In the 2021 novel The Last English Garden by Julia Kelly. Beth Pedley, a main character, is a land girl in Warwickshire. (Gallery Books, Simon & Schuster, New York NY)
- in the series the call the midwife in season 12x01 there are two women who were part of The Women's Land Army

== See also ==
- Australian Women's Land Army
- Air Transport Auxiliary, civilian female pilots who flew newly built planes from the factories to airfields
- Feeding Britain in World War II
- Mechanised Transport Corps, British women's organisation that provided drivers for government departments and other agencies during WWII
- Women's Auxiliary Air Force
- Boatwomen's training scheme, a replacement for men conscripted from the inland waterways
- Home front during World War II
- Rosie the Riveter
- Victory garden
