= Plym Valley Railway =

Heritage railway in Devon, England

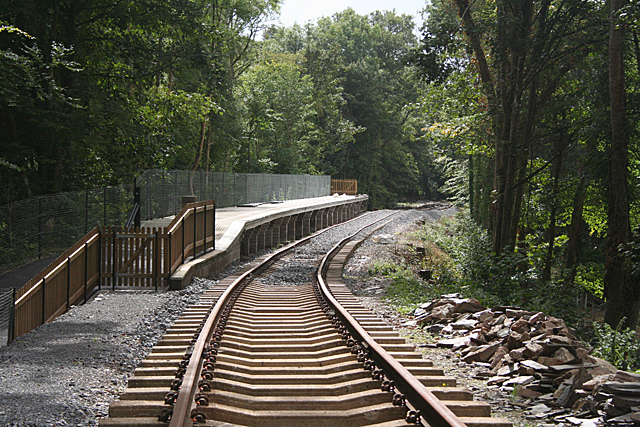
- Plym Bridge Halt
- Locale: Devon
- Coordinates: 50.395°N 4.083°W

Commercial operations
- Name: The Woodland Line
- Built by: South Devon and Tavistock Railway
- Original gauge: 7 ft 1/4 in (2,140 mm) Brunel gauge

Preserved operations
- Length: 1 mi 14 ch (1.9 km)
- Preserved gauge: 4 ft 8 1/2 in (1,435 mm) standard gauge

Commercial history
- Opened: 1859
- 1892: converted to 4 ft 8 1/2 in (1,435 mm)
- Closed: 1962

Preservation history
- 2008: Re-opened
- 2012: Extended to Plym Bridge
- Headquarters: Marsh Mills

The Plym Valley Railway is a 1-mile-14-chain (1.9 km) heritage railway based on part of the now-closed South Devon and Tavistock Railway, a branch line of the Great Western Railway in Devon, England. The line originally opened in 1859 and closed in 1962. Heritage trains first ran in 2001.

== History ==
The line was originally part of the South Devon and Tavistock Railway, a 7 ft 1/4 in (2,140 mm) broad gauge railway linking Plymouth with Tavistock in Devon, England. This opened in 1859, was converted to 4 ft 8 1/2 in (1,435 mm) in 1892 and closed in 1962.

Some local enthusiasts formed the Plym Valley Railway Association in 1980 to restore part of the line. Work started near Coypool in 1982 and they bought Bickleigh Siding in 1988 which became the site for a new Marsh Mills railway station. Trains could run the 713 yd (652 m) northwards to 'World's End' from October 2001 and another 617 yd (564 m) to the site of the Lee Moor Tramway crossing from May 2008. At this time the only station was at Marsh Mills but the line was extended to a new platform at Plym Bridge on 30 December 2012, exactly 50 years after the original line closed. This brought the heritage railway to a total length of 1 mile 14 chains (1.9 km).

== Location ==
The Plym Valley Railway is based at Marsh Mills on the eastern side of Plymouth.

=== Marsh Mills ===
Located at 50.3953°N 4.0827°W.

The original Marsh Mills railway station opened on 1 February 1860 to enable people in the area around Plympton to reach Tavistock without a lengthy detour to change trains at Plymouth. It was located 25 chains (500 m) from Tavistock Junction where the Tavistock line joined the South Devon Railway's line. Extensive goods facilities grew up around the station including a china clay works on the east side of the line and a military depot at Coypool on the west side of the line. Most of the station site has now been replaced by a road. The Plym Valley Railway opened a new station 7 ch (140 m) further north in 1988. Its single platform is on the west side of the line. The engine shed and sidings are on the same side of the line to the north of the station.

=== Plym Bridge ===
Located at 50.4085°N 4.0794°W.

The platform at Plym Bridge opened on 1 May 1906 to bring tourists to the picturesque area of the Plym valley. It was on the east side of the line. Originally built from timber, it was replaced by a shorter concrete platform in 1949. After the line closed, the concrete platform was moved to St Ives railway station so the Plym Valley Railway built a new one on the same foundations which opened on 30 December 2012.

== Rolling stock ==
=== Steam locomotives ===
Image	Number & name	Builder	Wheels	Built	To PVR	Notes
	Albert	Andrew Barclay	0-4-0ST	1948	2004	Works number 2248, this was built for the British Sugar Corporation and worked in Worcester and Somerset. It was preserved at the Nene Valley Railway and then the East Kent Railway before coming to the Plym Valley Railway in 2004.
	Byfield No. 2	Bagnall	0-6-0ST	1942	2002	Works number 2655, this was built in 1942 and worked at ironstone quarries in Northamptonshire. It later carried the name ‘'Loddington No. 2’' while working for another company. It was preserved on the Gloucestershire Warwickshire Railway in the 1980s but purchased by the Plym Valley Railway in 2002.
	705	Andrew Barclay	0-4-0ST	1937	2011	Works number 2047 was built for The Clyde Valley Electrical Power Company's Yoker power station where it was numbered 4. It was withdrawn in the 1970s and stored at the Strathspey Railway until it was moved to the East Somerset Railway where it was restored in 1994 and given the fictional Great Western Railway number 705. It was sold in 2011 and an overhaul was undertaken before it entered service on the Plym Valley Railway in 2018.
	5374 Lord Oliver Brown	Fablok TKh49	0-6-0T	1959	2016	This industrial shunting locomotive was built by Fablok in Poland. It was based at the Northampton & Lamport Railway in England from 1992.

=== Diesel locomotives ===
Image	Number & name	Class	Built	To PVR	Notes
	429; River Annan	Ruston & Hornsby LSSH	1961	Unknown	A former Ministry of Defence 0-6-0DM locomotive, Army number 429.
	10077	4w Sentinel	1961	2015	Works number 10077 worked at a quarry at Coxhoe in County Durham. It was preserved by the Durham Locomotive Preservation Group in 2002 on the Weardale Railway. It later moved to the Plym Valley Railway for restoration, entering service here in 2018.
	13002	Class 08	1952	1982	This shunter was built at Derby Works, the third Class 08 to be built. Originally numbered 13002, it was renumbered to D3002 in 1960. It was sold by British Rail in 1972 to Foster Yeoman and moved to Merehead Quarry in Somerset where it became number 11 Dulcote. It is painted in its original black colour scheme and numbered 13002.
	31190	Class 31	1960	2021	Originally numbered D5613, it was withdrawn in 2005.
	Vanguard	Thomas Hill 'Vanguard'	1963	1990	This 0-4-0DH shunter, works number 125V, was used at the Blue Circle Industries cement works in Plymstock. It came to the Plym Valley Railway on 30 March 1990.
	43063	Class 43	1977	2024	Built at Crewe Works in 1977 as part of unit 254004, alongside 43062, and originally finished in InterCity blue livery. It was later operated by Great Western Railway before being gifted to the Plym Valley Railway in 2024. In 2026, it was repainted into InterCity Swallow livery.

=== Diesel multiple units ===
Image	Number	Class	Built	To PVR	Notes
	50222 & 50338	Class 101	1958	2023	After it was taken out of passenger service, this unit were converted for departmental service. The cars were renumbered RDB977963 and RDB977964, the whole unit being known as Iris II. It was preserved on the West Somerset Railway in 2008 but moved to the Barry Tourist Railway the following year.
	51365 & 51407	Class 117	1960	1995	Originally a Western Region three-car unit number B427 (later L427), it moved to Tyseley in 1989 and became London Midland unit T304. It was withdrawn in 1992 but the two power cars were then reinstated and sent to Laira depot when there was a shortage of more modern units for services in Devon and Cornwall.
	142023	Class 142	1985	2021	This 'Pacer' unit (or 'Skipper' as they were known in Devon) entered service at Laira depot when it was painted in a GWR-inspired chocolate and cream livery. It was last in service with Northern Rail and entered service on the Plym Valley railway in their livery. Its individual cars are numbered are 55564+55614.
	143618	Class 143	1986	2022	This 'Pacer' unit finished its service with Great Western Railway at Exeter depot in 2022. Its car numbers are 55659 and 55684.

=== Former Plym Valley Railway locomotives ===
==== Steam ====
Image	Number & name	Class	Wheels	Built	On PVR	Notes
	3	Hawthorn Leslie	0-4-0ST	1926	Unknown	Works number 3597. This worked at Falmouth Docks and was believed to be the last steam locomotive working at any dock in the United Kingdom.
	4112 Springbok	SAR class GMA	4-8-2+2-8-4	1957	Unknown	A 3 ft 6 in (1,067 mm) gauge South African Railways articulated locomotive, Beyer Peacock works number 7827.
	34007 Wadebridge	SR West Country	4-6-2	1945	1981-2001	Moved to the Bodmin and Wenford Railway where its restoration was completed but then moved to the Mid-Hants Railway.
	75079	BR Class 4	4-6-0	1956	1993-2007	Sold to the Mid-Hants Railway

==== Diesel ====
Image	Number & name	Class	Built	On PVR	Notes
	D2046	Class 03	1958	2006-2023	D2046 was built at Doncaster Works in 1958 and withdrawn in 1971. It then saw industrial service with Gulf Oil at Waterston Refinery, Milford Haven, their number 2.
	50017; Royal Oak	Class 50	1968	2009-2014	After withdrawal in 1991, 50017 was restored on the West Somerset Railway and then worked on the main line for a while. It was rededicated to HMS Royal Oak in 2012 while based on the Plym Valley Railway.
	The Planet	Planet	1948	1993-?	An 0-4-0DM shunter built by F. C. Hibberd & Co., works number 3281. It used to work on Victoria Wharves at Plymouth and was moved to the Plym Valley Railway on 22 November 1993.
