= Clearbrook Halt railway station =

Disused railway station in Devon, England

Clearbrook Halt

General information
- Location: Clearbrook, Devon; England
- Coordinates: 50.47140°N 4.07985°W
- Platforms: 1

Other information
- Status: Demolished

History
- Opened: 29 October 1928
- Closed: 29 December 1962
- Original company: Great Western Railway
Location

Clearbrook Halt railway station was on the Launceston Branch Line a little over 6 miles (10 km) north of Plymouth in Devon, close to the village of Clearbrook. It opened in 1928 and closed with the branch line at the end of 1962.

== History ==
The South Devon and Tavistock Railway opened between Plymouth and Tavistock on 21 June 1859. At this time the only intermediate stations were at Bickleigh and Horrabridge. Other stations were added later to serve smaller communities. The Great Western Railway (GWR) which now owned the line, opened Clearbrook Halt on 29 October 1928.

The line closed in December 1962. The last train was scheduled to run on Saturday 29 December but got stuck in snow. It was eventually cleared from the line on Monday 31 December. The land was sold and turned into a private garden.

== Description ==
The station was situated 6 miles 25 chains (10.2 km; 6.31 mi) from Plymouth Millbay railway station.

The railway had just a single track. A short platform was built on the west side of the track made from earth supported by old railway sleepers. A corrugated iron shelter with a curved roof was erected at the north end of the platform. A path led up to the road that crossed the line by a bridge to the north of the station.

== Services ==
The timetable for September 1956 shows 9 trains to Tavistock and 10 to Plymouth North Road, Mondays to Fridays with 1 more in each direction on Saturdays. 4 trains continued beyond Tavistock to Launceston (6 on Saturdays). There was no Sunday service. The journey to Plymouth took around 20 or 30 minutes depending on the number of stops; the time to Tavistock was similar.

Trains of two or four coaches were worked by 4500 Class and 4575 Class 'Prairie tanks'. There were also autotrains worked by 6400 Class 'Pannier tanks'.

Preceding station	Disused railways	Following station
Shaugh Bridge	Great Western Railway (Launceston Branch Line)	Yelverton
