= South Devon and Tavistock Railway =

Railway line in England

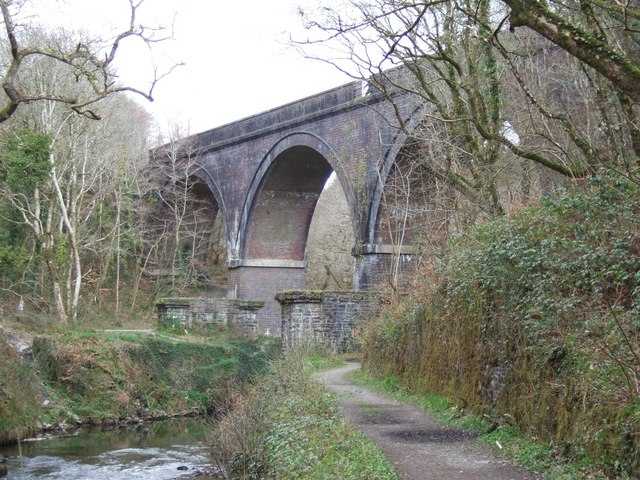
- Cann Viaduct over the River Plym

The South Devon and Tavistock Railway linked Plymouth with Tavistock in Devon; it opened in 1859. It was extended by the Launceston and South Devon Railway to Launceston, in Cornwall in 1865. It was a broad gauge line but from 1876 also carried the standard gauge (then referred to as narrow gauge) trains of the London and South Western Railway between Lydford and Plymouth: a third rail was provided, making a mixed gauge. In 1892 the whole line was converted to standard gauge only.

The line closed to passengers in 1962 although sections at either end were retained for a while to carry freight traffic. A short section has since been reopened as a preserved line by the Plym Valley Railway.

== History ==
The Plymouth and Dartmoor Railway, a horse-worked line, had been constructed to bring minerals from quarries near Princetown to Plymouth; it opened on 26 September 1823.

The South Devon Railway (SDR) built its line from Exeter to Plymouth, opening to a temporary station at Laira Green on 5 May 1848. It extended to its Plymouth terminus at Millbay on 2 April 1849 for passengers, with goods traffic starting on 1 May 1849. Continuous rail transport from Plymouth to London was now possible.

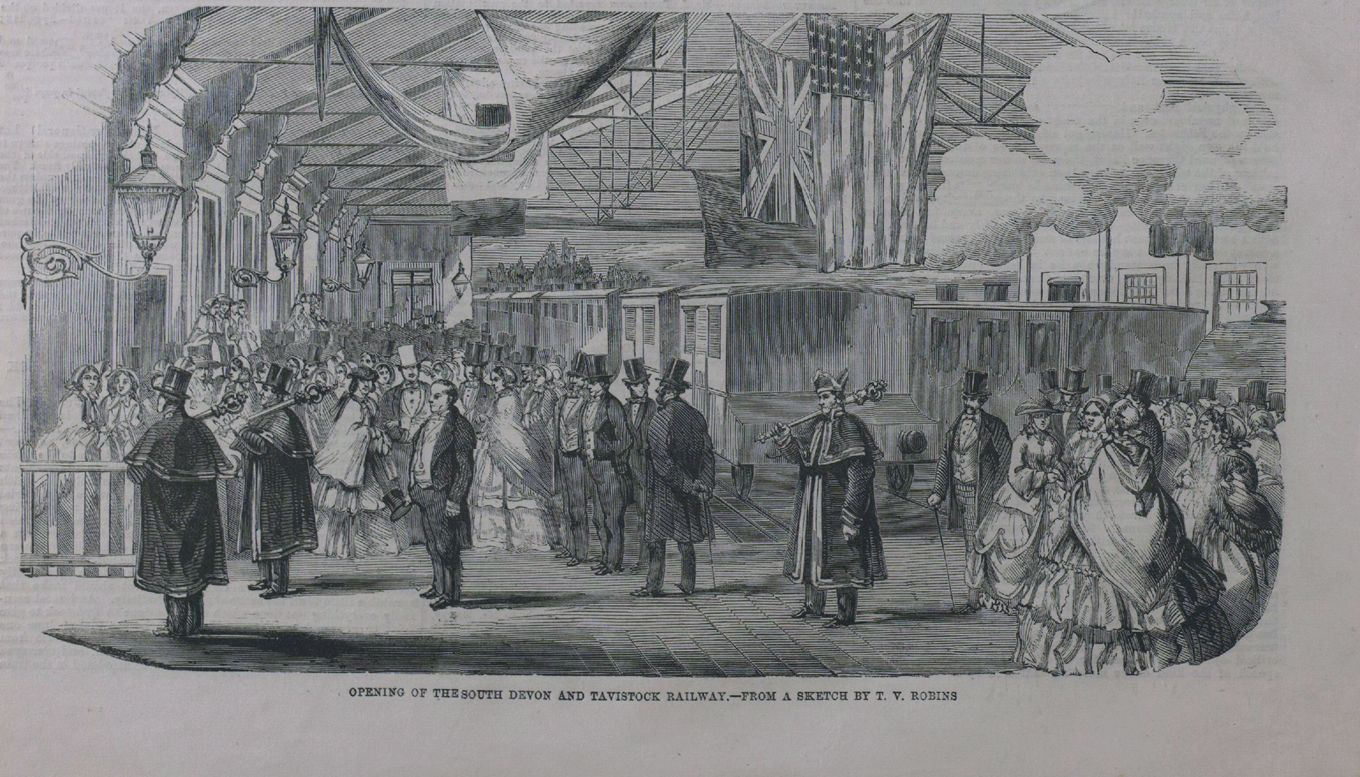
Opening ceremony of South Devon and Tavistock Railway in 1859; the US flag has only thirty stars; this was superseded in 1851, and by this date the correct flag had 32.

Promoters in the important towns near the Devon–Cornwall border developed schemes to connect their region to the new railway main line, including an early Launceston and South Devon Railway, but that proposal expired in 1846; there were also competing schemes, including a Plymouth, Tavistock, Okehampton, North Devon and Exeter Railway for a line connecting with the London and South Western Railway.

South Devon and Tavistock Railway Act 1854
- Act of Parliament
- Parliament of the United Kingdom
- Long title: An Act for making a Railway from the South Devon Railway near Plymouth to Tavistock, with a Branch, to be called "The South Devon and Tavistock Railway," and for other Purposes.
- Citation: 17 & 18 Vict. c. clxxxix

Dates
- Royal assent: 24 July 1854

Text of statute as originally enacted

South Devon and Tavistock Railway Act 1858
- Act of Parliament
- Parliament of the United Kingdom
- Long title: An Act to authorize the South Devon and Tavistock Railway Company to lease their Railway, to enable them to raise further Capital for the Completion of their Undertaking, and to make Arrangements as to their Share and borrowed Capital; and for other Purposes.
- Citation: 21 & 22 Vict. c. cii

Dates
- Royal assent: 12 July 1858

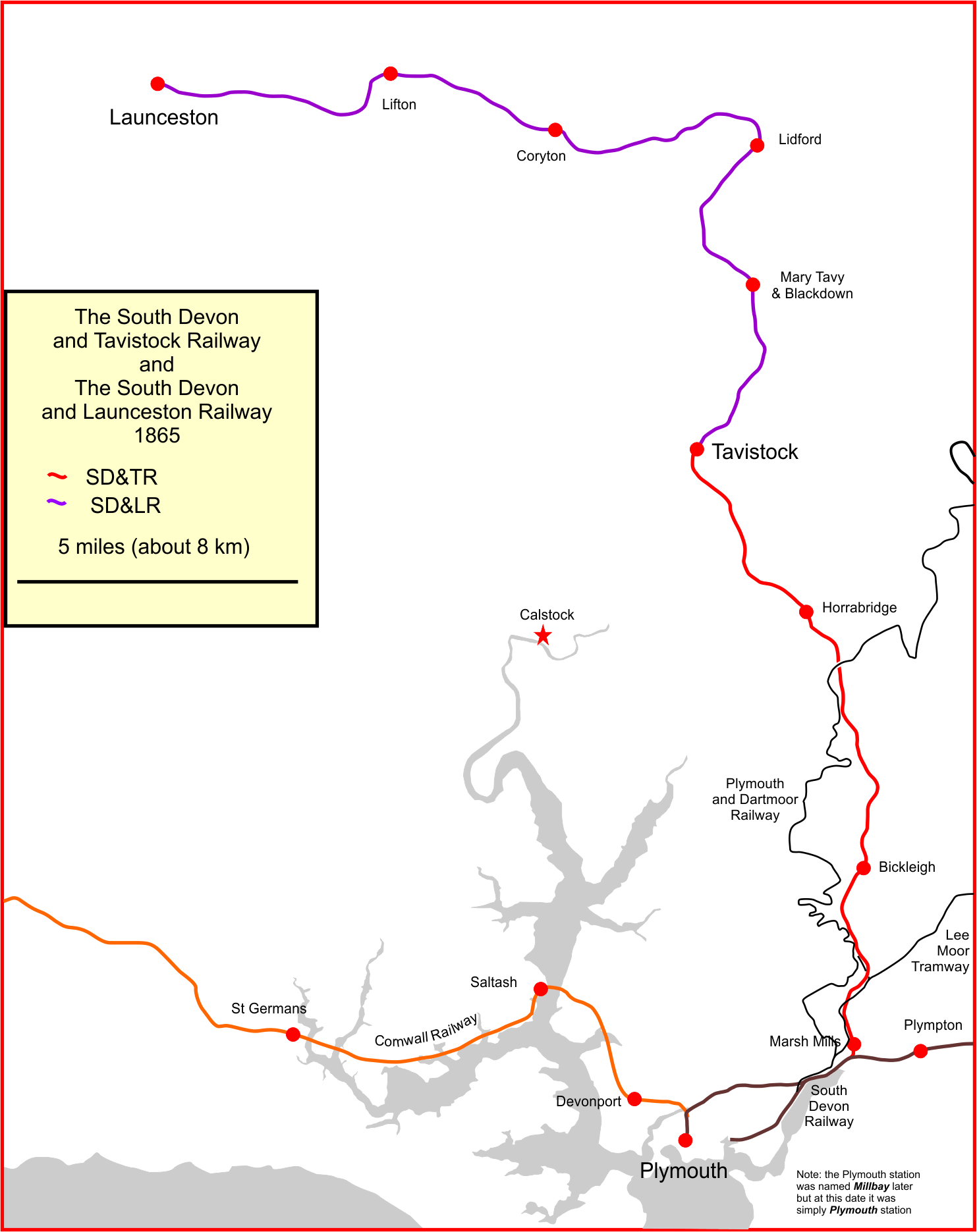
Tavistock Launceston lines in 1865

It was the South Devon and Tavistock Railway which obtained its act of Parliament, the South Devon and Tavistock Railway Act 1854 (17 & 18 Vict. c. clxxxix), on 24 July 1854, authorising construction of a 13-mile (21 km) line from Tavistock to a junction with the South Devon Railway east of Plymouth; the track gauge was to be the broad gauge, 7 ft 1/4 in (2,140 mm), and authorised capital was £160,000 with borrowing powers of £53,600.

As well as serving the connected communities, the line had the strategic purpose of blocking incursion by competing narrow gauge companies, sponsored by the London and South Western Railway (LSWR). However, in the final stage of getting the bill passed, it was in the Lords committee stage. Anthony says

There was period of anxiety in May, when it was rumoured that the House of Lords would compel the Company to introduce a clause for the narrow gauge to be adopted over the whole of the line, and even to carry it into Plymouth. The Lords did not, in fact, insist on the narrow gauge being laid throughout, but at the last moment, when the Bill came before Lord Reedsdale, he, without receiving any evidence upon the subject, and "by the immense authority he possessed in such matters", forced into the Bill a clause, that should a narrow gauge line ever connect itself with the Tavistock branch the Company would be obliged to admit the narrow gauge upon their system.

The Crimean War was in progress at the time, and the start of construction was delayed until September 1856. The chief engineer, A. H. Bampton, died a few months after the start of work, and the services of Isambard Kingdom Brunel were called in. The works were heavy, with three tunnels and six timber viaducts on stone piers.

The line was opened to passenger traffic on 22 June 1859, and for goods on 1 February 1860; it was worked by the South Devon Railway (SDR); trains from Tavistock joined the SDR main line at Tavistock Junction and ran to their Plymouth terminus at Millbay, a distance of 3½ miles.

=== Extension to Launceston ===
Launceston and South Devon Railway Act 1862
- Act of Parliament
- Parliament of the United Kingdom
- Long title: An Act for incorporating a Company for making a Railway in the Counties of Devon and Cornwall, to be called "The Launceston and South Devon Railway;" and for other Purposes.
- Citation: 25 & 26 Vict. c. cxi

Dates
- Royal assent: 30 June 1862

Text of statute as originally enacted

Launceston and South Devon Railway Act 1863
- Act of Parliament
- Parliament of the United Kingdom
- Long title: An Act to enable the Launceston and South Devon Railway Company to make a Deviation of their authorized Line of Railway; and for other Purposes.
- Citation: 26 & 27 Vict. c. cv

Dates
- Royal assent: 29 June 1863

Text of statute as originally enacted

Launceston and South Devon Railway Act 1866
- Act of Parliament
- Parliament of the United Kingdom
- Long title: An Act for conferring further Powers on the Launceston and South Devon Railway Company in relation to their Capital; and for other Purposes.
- Citation: 29 & 30 Vict. c. cxlvii

Dates
- Royal assent: 28 June 1866

Launceston and South Devon Railway Act 1869
- Act of Parliament
- Parliament of the United Kingdom
- Long title: An Act for altering and enlarging the powers of the Launceston and South Devon Railway Company for raising money, and for vesting their undertaking in the South Devon Railway Company; and for other purposes.
- Citation: 32 & 33 Vict. c. xli

Dates
- Royal assent: 24 June 1869

Text of statute as originally enacted

The Launceston and South Devon Railway Act 1862 (25 & 26 Vict. c. cxi) empowered an independent company to extend the broad gauge line from Tavistock on to Launceston. In contrast to the South Devon and Tavistock line, there were no engineering works of any difficulty, and the line opened to passengers on 1 June 1865, and for goods in October 1865. The Launceston line too was worked by the SDR from the outset.

The South Devon and Tavistock Railway merged with the South Devon Railway (SDR) on 1 July 1865 under the South Devon Railway Act 1865 (28 & 29 Vict. c. cclv). The Launceston company was absorbed into the SDR on 31 December 1873 under powers in the Launceston and South Devon Railway Act 1869 (32 & 33 Vict. c. xli). The South Devon Railway, in turn, amalgamated with the Great Western Railway (GWR) and the Bristol and Exeter Railway on 1 February 1876. The combined company was called the Great Western Railway.

== Connecting lines ==
=== LSWR to Lidford ===
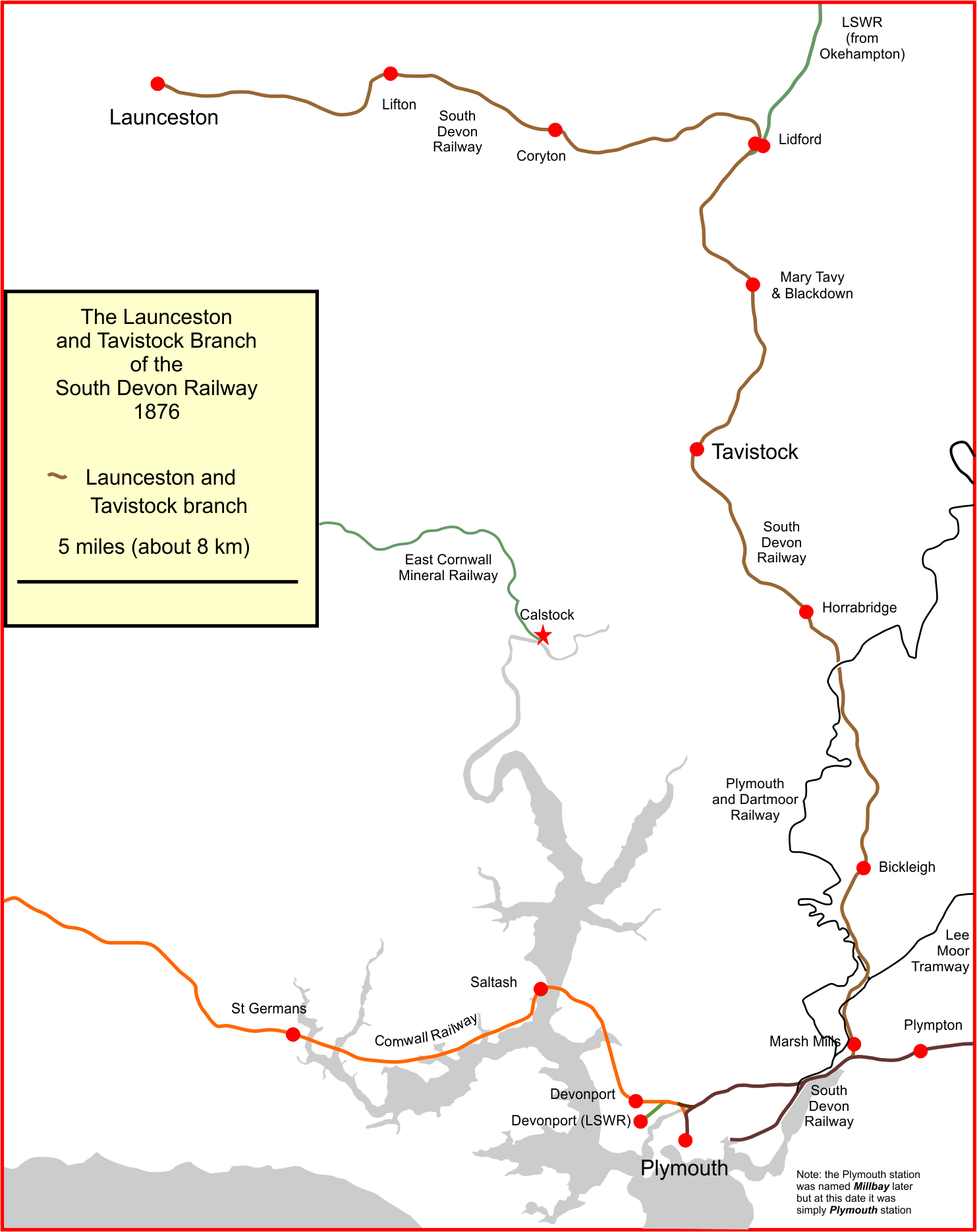
Tavistock and Launceston lines in 1874

Meanwhile, the London and South Western Railway (LSWR) had been extending its westward route from Exeter, and with the intention of reaching Plymouth it encouraged a nominally local company, the Devon and Cornwall Railway (D&CR), to obtain powers to build a line to Lidford (called Lydford from 3 June 1897). The D&CR opened its line to Okehampton on 3 October 1871, and continued construction towards Lidford, opening the line to there on 12 October 1874. The D&CR line was worked by the LSWR.

The station at Lidford was in fact a two-platform terminus, and at first there was no rail connection between the D&CR and the former Launceston and South Devon line (now part of the SDR itself). However under the clause inserted by Lord Reedsdale in the company's acts of Parliament, the South Devon was compelled to lay a third rail to make mixed gauge, so as to carry the LSWR's standard gauge trains over its line to Plymouth (the Millbay terminus and Sutton Harbour).

The D&CR planned to build a new line from Marsh Mills to new stations in Plymouth and Devonport, by-passing the SDR main line, but the SDR managed to block the application by undertaking to enlarge the Millbay station and improve the Sutton Harbour line. In the following parliamentary session the D&CR re-applied for powers to build independent lines at Plymouth, and this led to an agreement to facilitate separate goods accommodation at Plymouth for the D&CR, and to provide a new Plymouth station at North Road.

From 17 May 1876 LSWR trains ran from Exeter to the D&CR Devonport station over the SDR line from Lidford via Tavistock Junction.

=== Princetown Railway ===
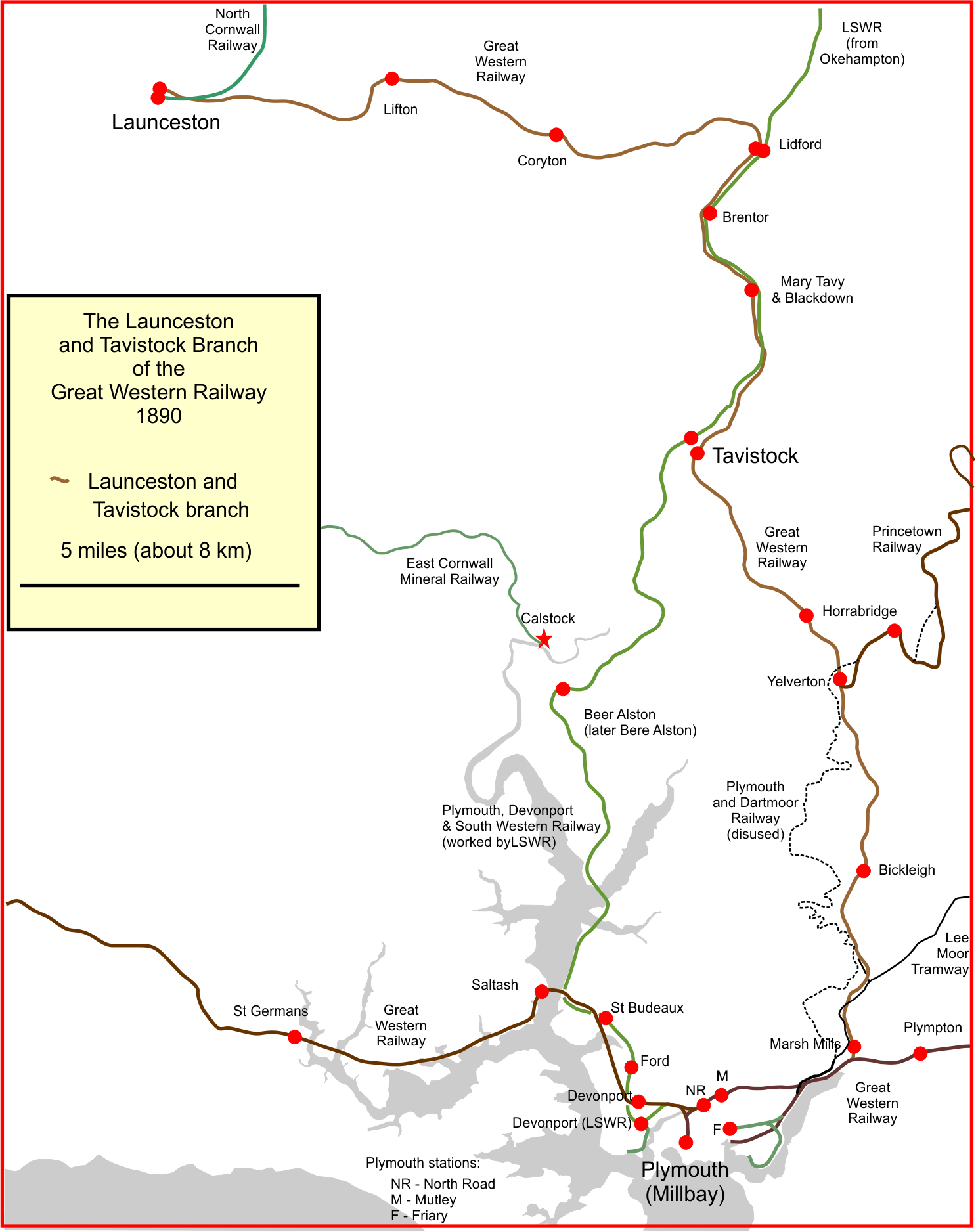
Tavistock and Launceston lines in 1890

The upper portion of the old Plymouth and Dartmoor Railway was taken over by the Princetown Railway, which opened a passenger line on 11 August 1883. This was standard gauge and connected with the Tavistock line at Yelverton Siding, but passenger trains on the branch used Horrabridge station as the connecting point until 1 May 1885, when Yelverton passenger station opened.

Trains and rolling stock running from Plymouth to the Princetown line used the standard gauge rail, laid for the LSWR, as far as Horrabridge.

=== LSWR independent route to Plymouth ===
The LSWR opened its independent line (Note: The line was constructed by the Plymouth, Devonport and South Western Junction Railway but worked by the LSWR) to Plymouth on 31 May 1890, after which its trains no longer used the South Devon line. The new route closely followed the South Devon route from Lydford most of the way to Tavistock, then swinging west to approach Plymouth from the west. The standard gauge north of Yelverton was little used for the next two years, but on 20 May 1892 the entire Launceston to Plymouth line, along with all the other remaining broad gauge lines, was converted to standard gauge.

Another LSWR line reached Launceston on 21 July 1886, offering the town a more direct route to London via Okehampton and Exeter.

== After nationalisation ==
Following nationalisation on 1 January 1948, steps were taken to consolidate the railways in the area. The South Devon station at Launceston was closed to passengers on 30 June 1952 and passenger trains used the former LSWR station.

The Princetown branch closed entirely on 3 March 1956.

The last passenger trains were scheduled to run from Launceston to Plymouth via Tavistock on 29 December 1962, the "closure" taking effect from the following Monday, 31 December. In the event heavy snow falls put an end to any celebrations: the 18:20 train from Plymouth reached Tavistock after midnight, and the 19:10 Tavistock to Plymouth was stranded at Bickleigh overnight.

Goods traffic continued to and from Lifton until 1964, serving a dairy there; trains reached Lifton via the LSWR line as far as Lydford. After 1964 Lifton was served by a trip from Launceston; it was finally withdrawn on 28 February 1966.

A new east to north connection to the branch was laid at Tavistock Junction to allow trains of china clay to shunt from the yard there to the china clay works at Marsh Mills.

== The line today ==
Much of the old line is now used for the Plym Valley Cycle Path (part of the National Cycle Network route 27), almost as far as Clearbrook.

A 1 1/2-mile (2.4 km) section of the line from Marsh Mills to Plym Bridge is operated as a heritage railway known as the Plym Valley Railway.

== Locomotives ==
=== Broad gauge ===
The Great Western Railway Leo class 2-4-0 was tried on the line before opening but found unsuitable.

On opening the South Devon Railway 4-4-0ST Corsair and Brigand were used on passenger traffic. From the opening to Launceston, Giraffe and Castor of the same type were transferred in. Goods traffic was handled by 0-6-0STs Dido and Ajax, followed by Bulkeley.

From 1878 the GWR Hawthorn class engines Melling and Ostrich were in use, followed by several member of the 3541 class of 0-4-2ST, based at Millbay. The last broad gauge train on the line was 4-4-0ST no 2134 Heron.

=== LSWR engines ===
On the opening of the mixed gauge, the LSWR 318 Metro type 4-4-0 tank engines were used, but they were found to be unsuitable and were replaced by the 0298 class of Beattie Well tanks.

When Drummond's large LSWR M7 class 0-4-4 tank engines were introduced in 1897, several of the class were allocated to work semi-fast passenger services between Exeter and Plymouth. However they were withdrawn from these duties after a high-speed derailment near Tavistock in 1898, following criticism by the Board of Trade inspector about the use of front-coupled locomotives on fast services. As a result, the class was transferred to stopping services, and the London suburban lines.

=== After gauge conversion ===
Dean type 35XX tank engines were employed on the line, followed by 3521 class rebuilt 4-4-0 tender engines.

When railmotors were introduced on GWR branches, they worked on these lines as far as Tavistock. They were replaced later with class 517 type engines fitted for auto-train working. From the 1920s the 45XX and 44XX type were dominant.

== Viaducts ==
The Tavistock section of the line involved traversing difficult terrain, and there were six large viaducts on the route. These, and a bridge, were designed in timber by Brunel. All built in 1859, from south to north they are:

Name	Mileage	Length	Number of spans	Longest span	Rebuilt	Spans in rebuilt structure
Cann Viaduct	2 m 15 ch	324 feet	7	62 feet	1907	6
Riverford Viaduct	2 m 65 ch	372 feet	6	65 feet	1893	5
Bickleigh Viaduct	3 m 37½ ch	501 feet	8	65 feet	1893	7
Ham Green Viaduct	4 m 27 ch	570 feet	probably 10	65 feet	1899	6
Tavistock Turnpike Road	8 m 71 ch	66 feet	1	66 feet	not known	1
Magpie Viaduct	9 m 46 ch	300 feet	6	60 feet	1902	4
Walkham Viaduct	10 m 14 ch	1101 feet	17	66 feet	1910	15

The viaducts were of the type classified as Continuous Laminated Beam. There were three longitudinal beams supporting the deck; these were in turn supported by the fans of four raking timbers springing from stone piers. On reconstruction the viaducts were built as stone arches.

The turnpike bridge was probably a King Through Truss, in which a timber A-frame provides the compression members, with wrought iron tie bars underneath; this design gives the best (least) depth of construction.

Mileages are mile post mileages from Tavistock Junction. (Note: Lewis says they are from Plymouth but this is a mistake. However he says that some of the spans given in MacDermot have been found by recent research to be inaccurate.)

== Route ==
The Tavistock line opened with just three stations and a further five were constructed by the Launceston company, but by 1938 the line had a total of fifteen stations and halts.

From Millbay, trains for the branch left the Exeter main line at Tavistock Junction; towards Launceston was nominated the down direction. A large goods marshalling yard was constructed at Tavistock Junction in GWR days in the angle between the Exeter main line and the Tavistock line; there were 25 sidings on the up side of the main line.

The junction was followed by

=== Marsh Mills ===
The station at Marsh Mills near Plympton was opened to passengers on 1 November 1865 although "some form of passenger facility was provided from 15th March 1861 so that residents from the Plympton area could travel to Tavistock, principally for the Friday market". A private siding had been existence from 1860. Local people had requested a station on the South Devon Railway main line, but instead this station was opened just 396 yards (362 m) along the Tavistock line.

The line was doubled through the station and as far as Tavistock Junction, probably for the LSWR trains in 1874.

Goods traffic was important with a flour mill, and china clay and stone traffic, and a tarmacadam plant. The china clay works near the station closed in 2008–09. Public goods traffic ceased on 1 June 1964.

A new station just north of the original was opened in 2008 and is now the headquarters of the Plym Valley Railway which started running trains towards Lee Moor Crossing, before extending further up the track to Plym Bridge four years later.

=== Plym Bridge Platform ===
Plym Bridge Platform was opened by the Great Western Railway on 1 May 1906 and was mainly used by people visiting the nearby countryside. Constructed of timber at first, it was rebuilt in concrete in 1949. There was no lighting, and early and late trains did not call.

It was reopened by the Plym Valley Railway on 30 December 2012 (exactly 50 years after its closure).

Between Plym Bridge and Bickleigh there were three viaducts, Cann Viaduct, Riverford Viaduct and Bickleigh Viaduct.

=== Bickleigh ===
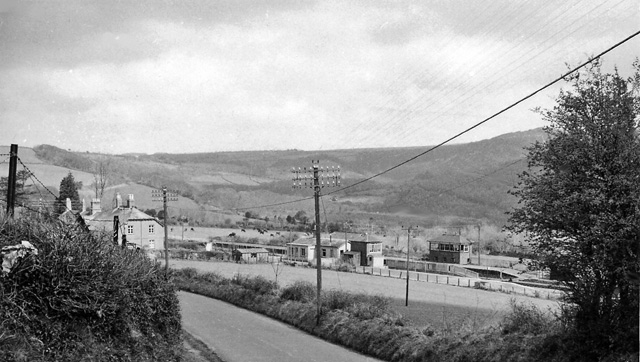
Remains in 1964 of Bickleigh Station

A station was provided at Bickleigh from the opening of the line, with a passing loop. Goods traffic was handled from 1 February 1860.

A short distance to the north of the station was Ham Green Viaduct.

=== Shaugh Bridge Platform ===
Another of the Great Western Railway's countryside halts, Shaugh Bridge Platform opened on 21 August 1907 near the village of Shaugh Prior and was convenient for visitors to the picturesque Dewerstone Rock. The platform still stands today (2020).

The platform was situated a short distance south of Shaugh Tunnel, 307 yards.

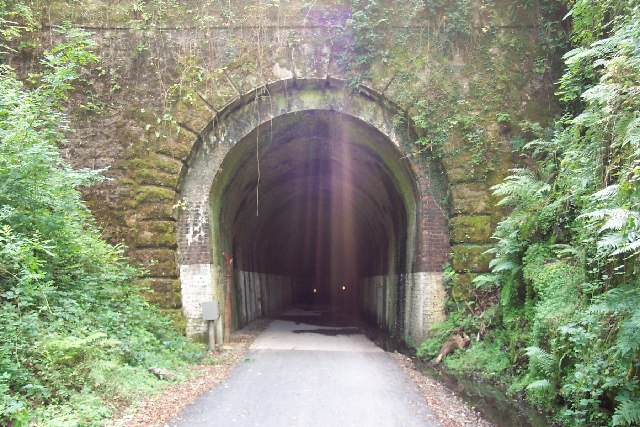
Shaugh Tunnel

=== Clearbrook ===
Clearbrook Halt opened on 29 October 1928, much later than others in the area. It was convenient for day visitors to the surrounding countryside, as well as for the villages of Clearbrook, Hoo Meavy and Goodmeavy.

=== Yelverton ===
Yelverton station opened on 1 May 1885, and was the junction station for the Princetown branch. The branch had opened on 11 August 1883, but the company could not secure an access route to the site, and so branch passenger trains initially continued to Horrabridge.

The Tavistock line at Yelverton was provided with two platforms; the Princetown line had a single platform, and the main line connection faced Tavistock. The branch platform was sharply curved; a five-sided waiting room was provided between the platforms. A 23-foot-6-inch (7.16 m) turntable was provided at the Princetown end of the platform. Branch passenger trains arriving were propelled out of the platform after passengers had alighted; the locomotive then ran into the turntable siding and the carriages were then gravitated into the platform, after which the locomotive could be attached to the Princetown end for the next journey.

The Princetown line closed on 5 March 1956 but the station was retained until the Tavistock line itself was closed on 31 December 1962.

The 641-yard (586 m) Yelverton Tunnel was just north of the platforms and was the summit of the Tavistock line.

=== Horrabridge ===
One of the stations provided for the opening of the line, this served the village of Horrabridge. It generated copper ore which was sent to Plymouth for shipping to South Wales.

From 11 August 1883 until the opening of Yelverton station on 1 May 1885 it was the junction station for the Princetown Railway.

The main platform and goods yard was on the side used by trains towards Plymouth, but a loop and second platform was provided for trains towards Tavistock. There was originally a level crossing at the south end of the station, but this was closed on 5 March 1952. The original crossing gates were said to have the largest single span in the country.

Between Horrabridge and Whitchurch Down the line passed over Magpie Viaduct and then Walkham Viaduct, the longest on the line; it was rebuilt in 1910 using metal girders. The line then passed through Grenofen Tunnel (374 yards (342 m)).

=== Whitchurch Down Platform ===
The Great Western Railway opened Whitchurch Down Platform on 1 September 1906 to serve the village of Whitchurch. The platform was on the right for trains going northwards to Tavistock. There had been a siding for loading copper ore from Wheal Crelake here.

=== Tavistock South ===
As befitting the terminus of the South Devon and Tavistock Railway, the station (50.5471°N 4.1442°W) at Tavistock was provided with a large train shed that spanned the two platforms and three tracks. The station was situated on the hillside close to the town centre. The original buildings were of timber, but they were badly damaged by a fire in 1887 and were replaced by a stone structure.

The main buildings were on the side used by trains going towards Plymouth. A footbridge was eventually provided at the north end of the station beyond the train shed. A small engine shed was provided at the other end of the station, but this was no longer needed once the Launceston and South Devon Railway opened on 1 July 1865.

On 26 September 1949 the station was renamed Tavistock South to distinguish it from the Southern Region station on the Plymouth to London Waterloo route, which was then named "Tavistock North". Passenger services were withdrawn on 31 December 1962 but goods traffic continued until 7 September 1964. Passengers could still travel by train from Tavistock North until it closed in 1968.

=== Mary Tavy and Blackdown ===
This station was situated about 1/2 mile (0.80 km) from both Mary Tavy and Blackdown, and was originally known as just Mary Tavy. It was renamed Mary Tavy and Blackdown in 1906. A passing loop was provided, but it was removed in 1892, leaving in use just the platform on the right of trains going towards Launceston. Goods traffic was only handled until 11 August 1941.

=== Lydford ===
The station was known as Lidford until 3 June 1897.

When the London and South Western Railway (LSWR) reached Lydford from Okehampton on 12 October 1874, it opened a terminal station adjoining the SD&LR station; passengers travelling on to Plymouth changed trains there. From 17 May 1876, it made a junction with the South Devon line, and using running powers, its trains ran over the SD&LR and SD&TR lines to Plymouth.

After 31 May 1890 the LSWR opened its independent line to Plymouth, running broadly parallel to the South Devon line as far as Tavistock, but crossing over; after Tavistock it diverged westward to reach Plymouth via Bere Alston. It constructed its own Lydford station, immediately adjacent to the South Devon station, with a broad, shared, central island platform. The connecting line remained in place until 1895, although it was only used for wagon exchange. The two stations were operated separately until March 1914 when a joint economy initiative led to common operation here. In 1916 the separate signal boxes were abolished, control passing to a new common signal box that had two lever frames, one on each side of the operating floor, for the respective routes.

The connecting line was reinstated as a running line in the summer of 1943 as a wartime emergency measure.

When the SD&LR line closed, the station continued in use for Southern Region trains until May 1968.

=== Liddaton Halt ===
The halt at Liddaton was opened much later than the other stations on the line, on 4 April 1938. It was a simple wooden platform with a small waiting hut, also constructed from wood.

=== Coryton ===
The opening of the line on 1 June 1865 saw the opening of a station to serve Coryton. The platform was on the right of trains going towards Launceston. It was unstaffed from 14 September 1959 but was retained until the closure of the line on 31 December 1962. The station master's house survives (2007), as does the main office although this has been extended since closure.

=== Lifton ===
The station at Lifton was opened with the railway on 1 June 1865. The main building was on the platform used by trains towards Plymouth but there was a loop and second platform to allow trains to pass. There was a level crossing at the west end of the station.

The goods yard was on the same side as the buildings but a private siding was opened in 1894 to serve a corn mill, and a factory was opened in the goods yard in 1917 that handled milk, and later made "Ambrosia" rice pudding. Passenger trains and public goods traffic ceased on 31 December 1962 but the line to Lydford was retained to carry the trains from the milk factory but this closed on 28 February 1966.

=== Launceston ===
The terminus of the line. The North Cornwall Railway opened a station adjacent as part of its main line, which crossed over the South Devon route east of the town. The two companies kept separate stations for many years but from August 1915 they were operated under a common management, and on 31 December 1916 the SD&LR signal box was abolished, and the LSWR box controlled movements in both stations. On 22 September 1943 a connection was established between the two lines as a wartime precautionary measure. From 18 June 1951 the station was retitled Launceston North, but from 30 June 1952 all passenger trains were diverted to use the former LSWR platforms. The station remained open for goods traffic until 28 February 1966, the LSWR station, Launceston South, being closed completely on 3 October 1966.
