= Amy Curtis =

Irish WRNS superintendent (1894–1970)

- Born: 4 February 1894; Dublin, Ireland
- Died: 29 July 1970 (aged 76); Kilpedder, County Wicklow, Ireland
- Burial place: St Patrick's Church Graveyard, Enniskerry, County Wicklow, Ireland
- Military career
- Allegiance: United Kingdom
- Branch: British Army; Royal Navy
- Service years: 1915-1920; 1939-1950
- Rank: Superintendent (WRNS); Chief Administrative Officer (WLA)
- Units: Voluntary Aid Detachment; Queen Mary's Army Auxiliary Corps; Women's Royal Naval Service; Women's Land Army
- Conflicts: First World War; Second World War
- Awards: CBE

Amy Curtis, CBE (4 February 1894 - 29 July 1970) was an Irish administrator, superintendent of the Women's Royal Naval Service in the Portsmouth command and the final chief administrative officer of the Women's Land Army.

== Early life ==
Amy Curtis was born in Dublin on 4 February 1894. Her parents were George Frederick Wilkinson and Mary Noble Curtis (née Hewson). The family lived in 5 Proby Square, Blackrock, County Dublin. Curtis was educated at home, and later at Belgrave School, Rathmines.

== Military service ==
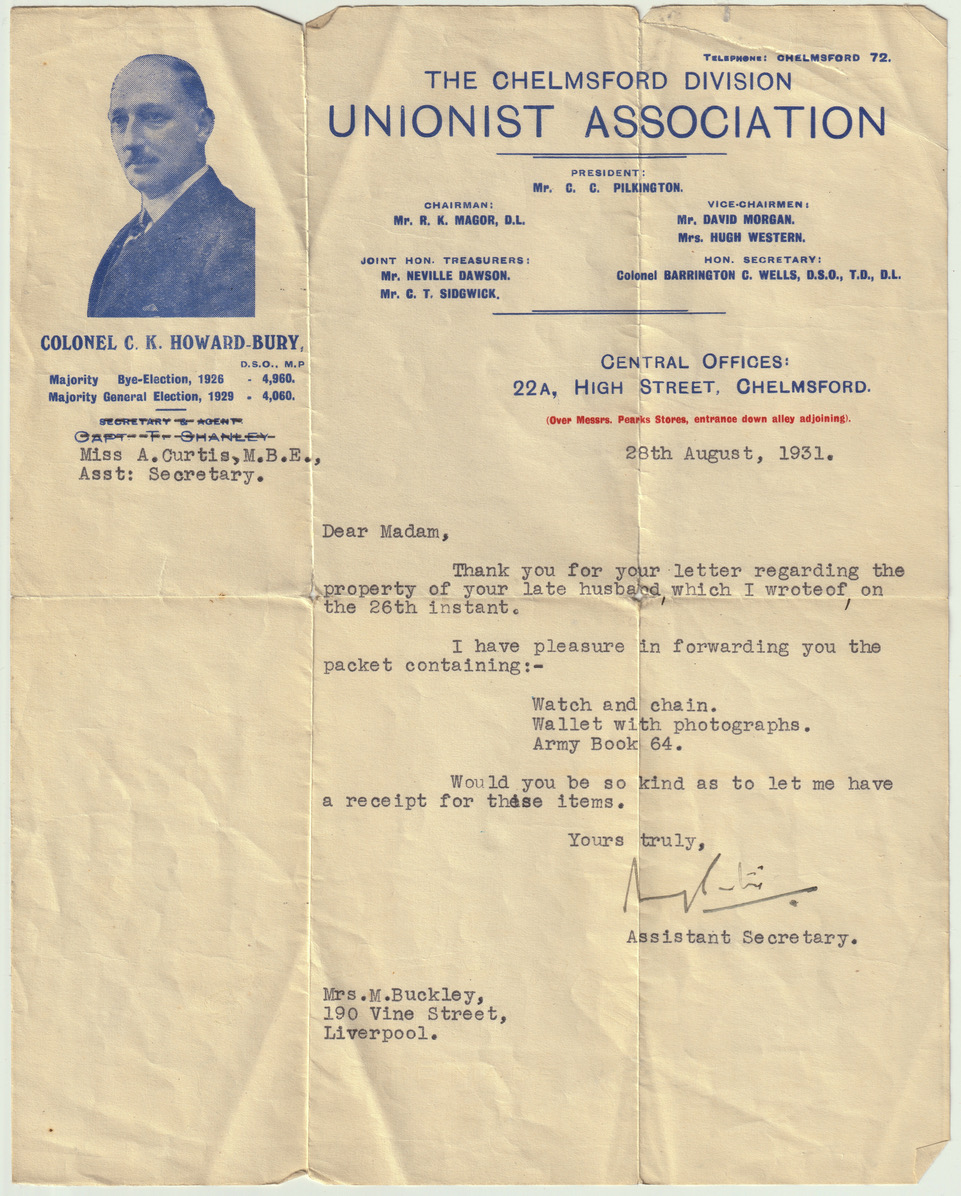
Letter from Curtis regarding reuniting a family with a soldier's belongings

During World War I, from 1915 to 1917, Curtis served as a Voluntary Aid Detachment clerk. She was an administrator in Queen Mary's Army Auxiliary Corps from 1917 to 1920. Between 1920 and 1930 she was partner in a Guernsey firm of growers, and from 1930 to 1939 she worked as an agent to the Chelmsford unionist association.

After the outbreak of World War II she reentered public service, appointed superintendent of the Women's Royal Naval Service in the Portsmouth command from 1939 to 1944. From 1945 to 1948 she was part of the resettlement advice service of the British Ministry of Labour and National Service. She was the last chief administrative officer of the Women's Land Army between 1948 and 1950.

In 1919 she received an MBE, and in 1946 a CBE. Curtis was an avid gardener, and moved to Ram Park Cottage, Kilpedder, County Wicklow. She died on 29 July 1970. Admiral Sir William James said of Curtis: "I am most fortunate in my Superintendent, a Miss Amy Curtis. She is a most remarkable woman and combines firmness, tact and charm to a degree rare in women of authority. The Wrens all admire and respect her ... though there are 6,000 Wrens, I have never had a disciplinary case to deal with. I put this down to her fine example and leadership." She was buried in St Patrick's Church Graveyard, Enniskerry.
