= Hilda Gibson =

- Hilda Gibson at Downing Street (2008)
- Born: Hilda Gibson; 16 January 1925; Blackpool, England
- Died: 30 December 2013 (aged 87–88); Huddersfield, England
- Known for: Campaign for recognition of Women's Land Army

Hilda Kaye Gibson (1925 – 30 December 2013) was a member of the Women's Land Army, colloquially known as the Land Girls, during the Second World War, and campaigned to gain official governmental recognition for the service of WLA members.

Gibson worked as a member of the WLA from 1944 to 1946, initially stationed at Lincolnshire to control pests then was stationed at a poultry farm in Norfolk to feed poultry and clean their quarters.

She married Kenneth Gibson in 1948 and had three children: Stella, Laurence and Edward. In later life, Gibson was a poet, and was interviewed a number of times on BBC Radio 4 about her experiences as a Land Girl.

Gibson received the badge of recognition in 2008 during a Prime Ministerial reception at Downing Street. On receipt of her medal, Gibson stated that "To serve one’s country in its greatest hour of need, in whatever capacity, for me remains memorable. To receive an award honouring the wartime work of the Women’s Land Army is a powerful and touching recognition."
