= Clashnoir =

Coordinates: 57.282°N 3.286°W

Clashnoir is a hamlet in Moray, Scotland, 92 miles north of Edinburgh and 25 miles south of Elgin.
