= Clotherholme =

Hamlet in North Yorkshire England

Coordinates: 54.142°N 1.545°W

- Village
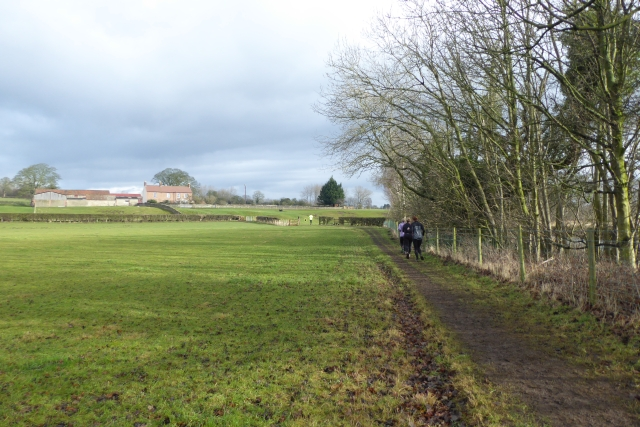
- Footpath to Clotherholme Farm

- Location within North Yorkshire
- OS grid reference: SE285723
- Civil parish: Ripon
- Unitary authority: North Yorkshire
- Ceremonial county: North Yorkshire
- Region: Yorkshire and the Humber
- Country: England
- Sovereign state: United Kingdom
- Post town: RIPON
- Postcode district: HG4
- Police: North Yorkshire
- Fire: North Yorkshire
- Ambulance: Yorkshire
- UK Parliament: Skipton and Ripon constituency

Clotherholme is a settlement 2 miles (3.2 km) to the north-west of Ripon in North Yorkshire, England. The village of Clotherholme was mostly depopulated at some unknown time thereafter becoming a very small settlement with a population of just 12 in 1871. The British Army opened up a training camp in the area in 1914 which was named as Claro and Deverell Barracks; these camps are due to close in the late 2020s and are proposed to be redeveloped into a new village with 1300 homes, also called Clotherholme.

== History ==
Clotherholme was mentioned in the Domesday Book as belonging to William of Percy and having one ploughland. Much of the land that formed the later Clotherholme parish was granted to the monks of Fountains Abbey in the late 12th century. In 1312, Roger De Coltherum (Note: Coltherum was one of the other precursor names of the settlement; by 1788 it was known as Clitherhom.) was granted the right to found a chantry in the Chapel of St Mary the Virgin in Clotherholme. Eight years later, the manor came into the possession of the Pygot family when De Coltherum's daughter, Joan, married into the Pygot family, and two years later (in 1322), the village was said to have been devastated in a raid by the Scots. The chapel was still in use in 1535 as it is mentioned in a subsidy roll for Henry VIII. The priest in charge was Constantyne. The manor house at Clotherholme, which has been destroyed, was the seat of the Pigot family; it is thought that at least one member of the Pigot family took part in the Wars of the Roses, and another fulfilled the role of Wakeman in Ripon. The house was demolished in the 17th century, though there are some remains. Evidence points to the site possibly being demolished after a fire. Beresford describes the site of the village as "small but interesting" in his Lost Villages survey.

The name of the settlement derives from the Old English clũder, or clũderum, meaning rocks, or stony ground. The parish registers for Ripon from 1574 to 1628, which documented baptisms, marriages and burials, had various different entries for Clotherholme; Clotheram, Clotherem, Cloddrum, Cloderum, Clouderum, and Clitheran. A metal sword found in the area is believed to date from the c. 100 BC; it was dug up in 1914 and at the time, it was the oldest sword found in West Yorkshire. A map from 1849 shows only Bishopton Close (which became the grammar school) as the only building in the Clotherholme area, though that would later be registered in the later parish of Bishopton. Similarly in 1835, Clotherholme had only one registered voter out of the 619 in the Pateley Bridge district, and Bishopton had six. A survey from 1881 determined that the settlement was 2 miles (3.2 km) north-west of Ripon and covered 339 acres (137 ha).

The two army barracks of Claro and Deverell, are all that is left of a huge encampment created in 1914 upon the outbreak of the First World War. Not long after opening, the army camp housed over 30,000 men, and stretched around the north and western sides of the city, with another site at Ure Bank on the north-eastern side of Ripon. The camp was mostly demolished apart from the two extant camps at Claro and Deverell, but aerial imagery still shows the groundworks of the rest of the camp covering some 25 hectares (62 acres) west of Ripon from Clotherholme to Studley Roger. In 1993 the total number of personnel serving at the site totalled 1,000 (70% military and 30% civilian), and by the 2010s, it was expected that the site would close in 2017 but the final closure date was pushed back. It is hoped that the creation of a new village on the site of the army camps will retain some of the historical buildings associated with both the World Wars, in particular those which were used as training for the D-Day Landings. Homes England announced in June 2025 that they had acquired the sites from the army and intend to start building when the British military vacate the area in 2026. The plan calls for 1,300 homes, a primary school, a community centre and a retail centre. The new village also to be called Clotherholme is projected to increase Ripon's population by a fifth. There are some World War One era huts on the site of the barracks and efforts were made to preserve these for their historical value; however the developers said they will need to be demolished as they contain asbestos.

== Parish and population ==
Historically, the parish of Clotherholme was in the wapentake of Burgshire at the Domesday survey, later known as Claro, and in the Rural District of Ripon and of Pateley Bridge. During the 19th century it was described as a township in the parish of Ripon and the census of 1811 determined that the population of 18 was spread across only eight family groups. It was transferred into North Yorkshire from the old West Riding of Yorkshire in 1974. In 1866, the legal definition of 'parish' was changed to be the areas used for administering the poor laws, and so Clotherholme became a civil parish. At the 1971 census (one of the last before the abolition of the parish), Clotherholme had a population of 1463. It is now part of the Ripon civil parish, having been subsumed into the parish of Ripon on 1 April 1988, and is represented at Westminster as part of the Skipton and Ripon Constituency. The ancient Ecclesiastical parish for the area was Ripon which is now Ripon Cathedral Parish with Littlethorpe.

Population of Clotherholme 1801–1971
Year	1801	1811	1821	1831	1841	1851	1861	1871	1881	1891	1901	1911	1921	1931	1951	1961	1971
Population	11	18	16	14	10	17	12	12	12	11	28	43	118	118	2,010	1,025	1,463

In 1965, it was estimated that the parish was 644 acres (261 ha) and had 94 inhabited houses.

== See also ==
- Claro Barracks
