= Clochan, Moray =

Hamlet in Moray, Scotland

Coordinates: 57.63411216998°N 3.003853337302°W

Clochan: Scottish Gaelic: Clochan
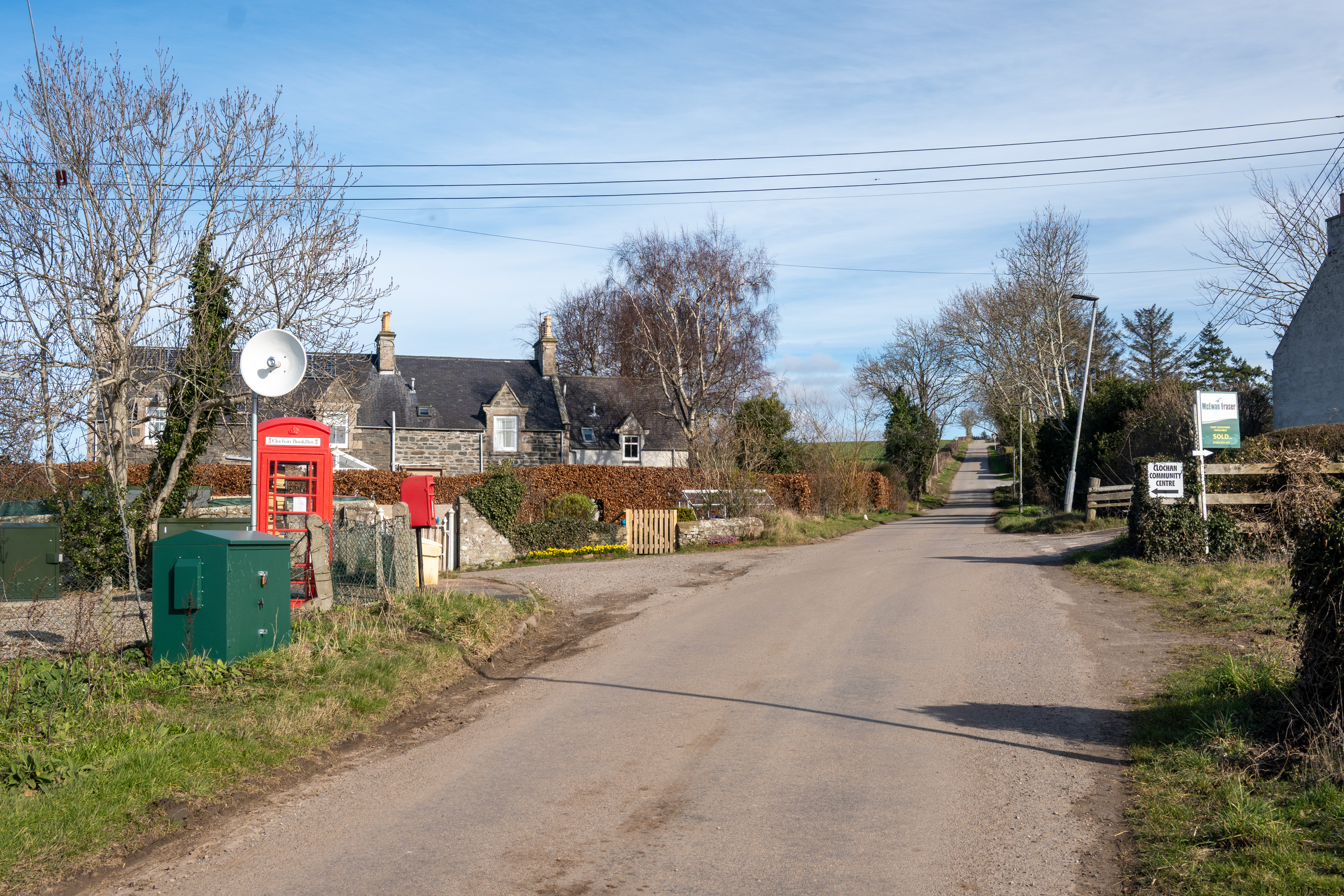

- Location within Moray
- OS grid reference: NJ3664
- Council area: Moray
- Lieutenancy area: Moray
- Country: Scotland
- Sovereign state: United Kingdom
- Police: Scotland
- Fire: Scottish
- Ambulance: Scottish

Clochan is a hamlet in Moray, Scotland located about 2.5 miles (4 kilometres) south-west of Buckie.

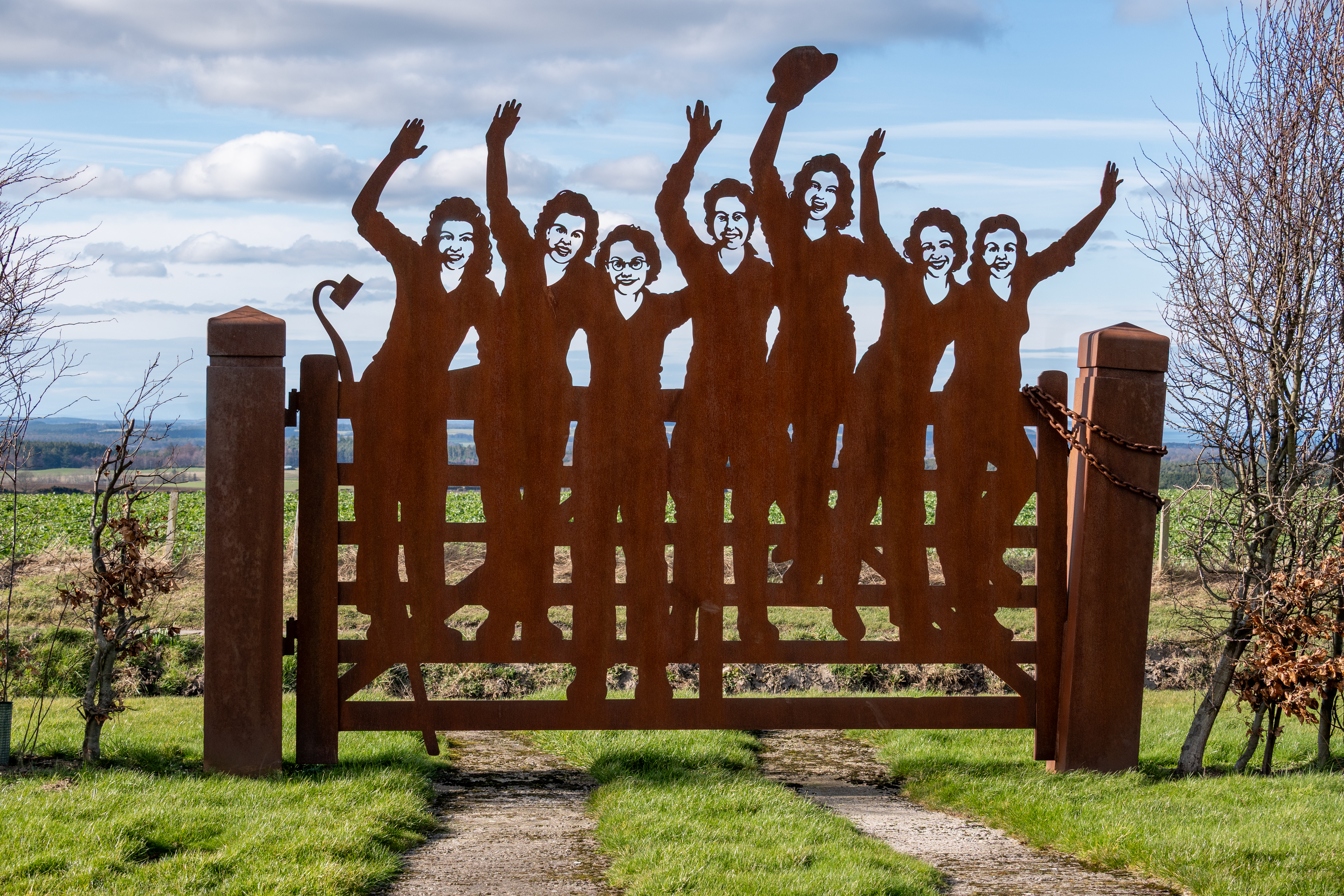
Women's Land Army memorial by Peter Naylor

The hamlet is known for the memorial dedicated to the Women's Land Army, designed by Peter Naylor and unveiled in 2012 by the then Charles, Prince of Wales. The villages of Broadley and Bridge of Tynet are nearby to the west.
