= Clerkhill =

Coordinates: 57°30′05″N 1°47′56″W

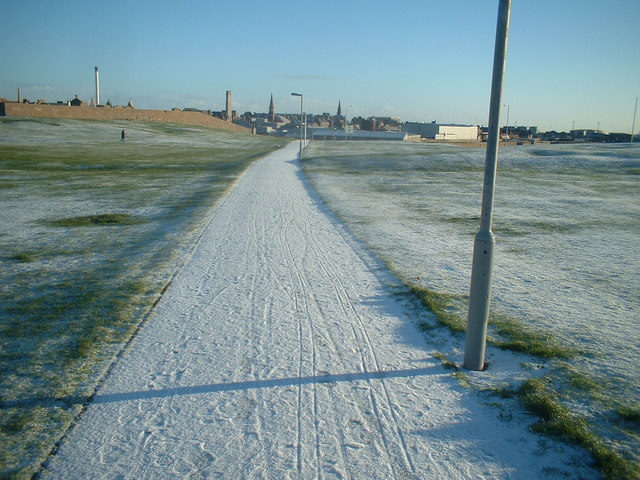
Path head in Clerkhill suburbs

Clerkhill is an area of the town of Peterhead in north east Scotland. Surrounded by the areas of Meethill, Dales Park and Coplandhill, it is one of the bigger areas of the town.

Clerkhill has two schools, Clerkhill Primary School, founded in 1969, and Anna Ritchie School. There is a shopping area and a public house named the Clerkhill Inn. Clerkhill has two large green areas. The Links in the north east is adjacent to the town's Lido bay; it has two football pitches. In the west is Eden Park, which has playground facilities.
