= Clerkenwater =

Hamlet in Cornwall, England

Coordinates: 50.487°N 4.725°W

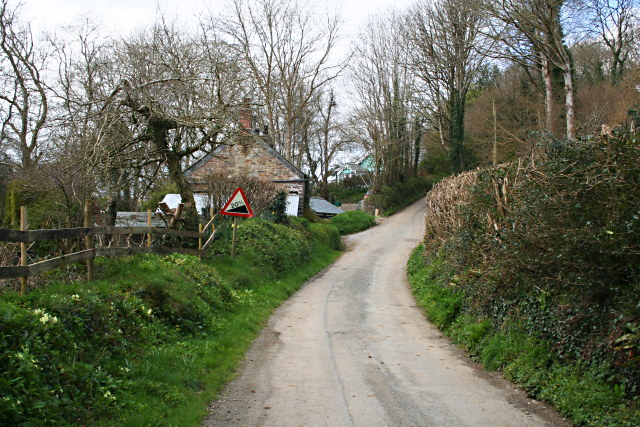
Clarkenwater

Clerkenwater is a hamlet in the parish of Helland, Cornwall, England. Clerkenwater is situated 1.2 miles (1.9 km) north of Bodmin.
