= Clearbrook, Devon =

Village in West Devon, England

Coordinates: 50.47014°N 4.07875°W

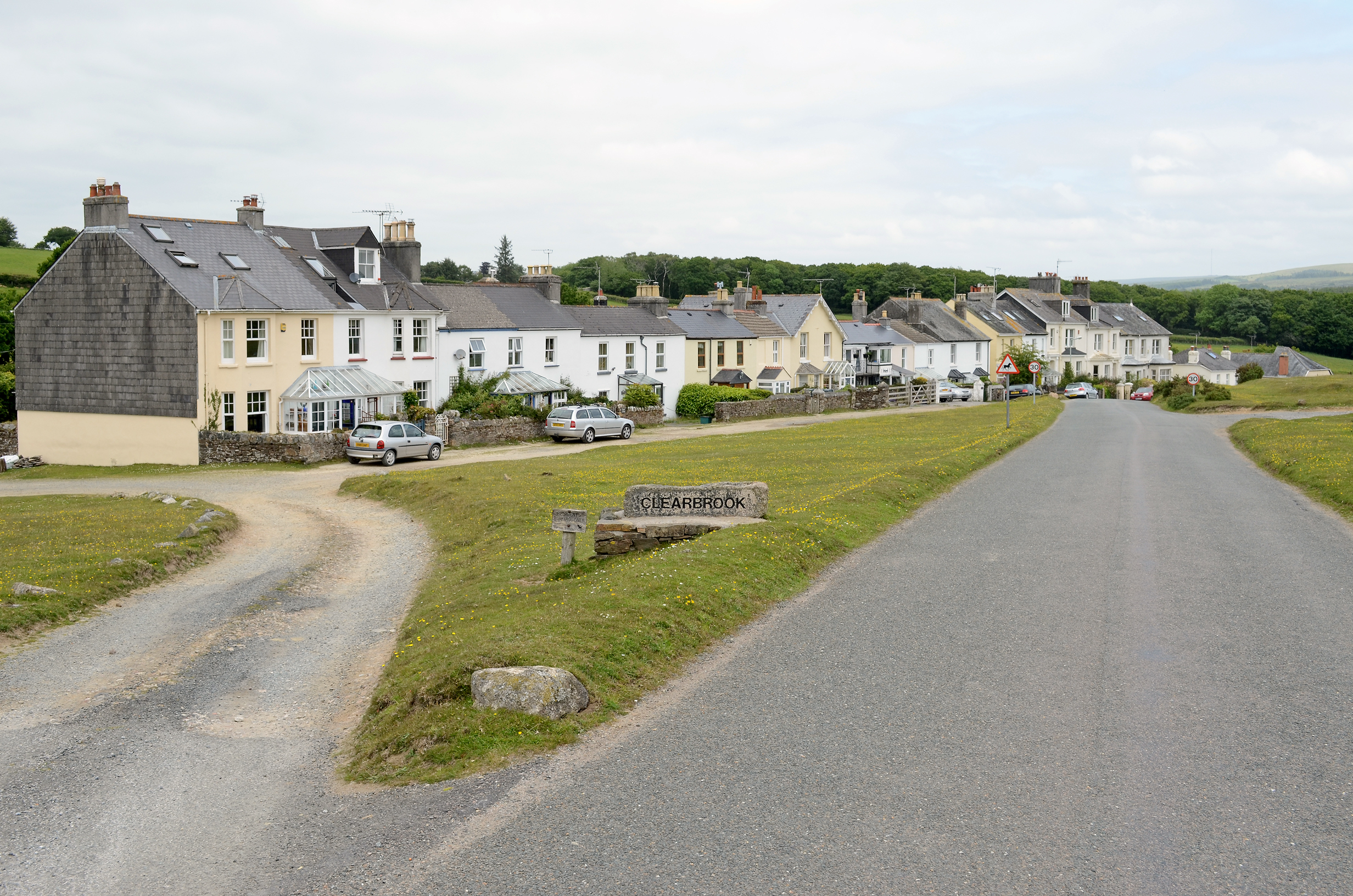
Clearbrook in 2011

Clearbrook is a village in the parish of Buckland Monachorum in West Devon district, Devon, England. The village lies on the River Meavy, south of Yelverton.

The village has a pub, The Skylark. It has been said that it is the only one of that name in Britain, but as of 2024 there is also a Skylark in Wellington, Somerset.

Clearbrook Halt railway station on the South Devon and Tavistock Railway served the village from 1928 until the line closed in 1962.

Clearbrook also has a cycle path, which links towards Plymbridge, Yelverton, Woolwell, Plympton, and onwards towards the city centre of Plymouth.

Clearbrook has a village hall, for events and worship.
