= Dousland railway station =

Former railway station in Devon, England

Dousland
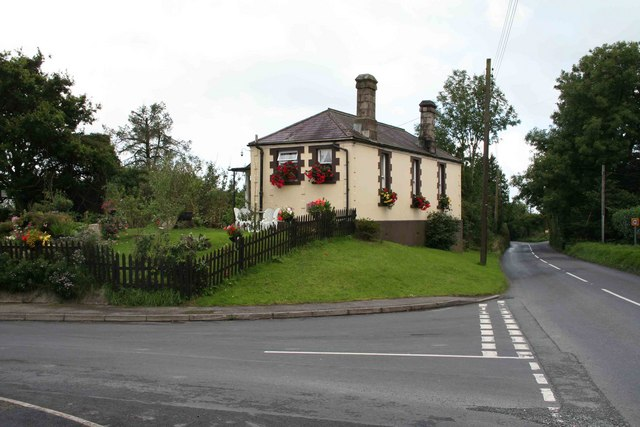
- The disused station in 2009

General information
- Location: Yelverton, West Devon; England
- Coordinates: 50.5009°N 4.0654°W
- Grid reference: SX5362068838
- Platforms: 1

Other information
- Status: Disused

History
- Original company: Princetown Railway
- Pre-grouping: Princetown Railway
- Post-grouping: Great Western Railway

Key dates
- 11 August 1883: Station opens as Dousland Barn
- 1915: Station renamed as Dousland
- 3 March 1956: Station closed to passengers
Location

Dousland railway station, originally opened at Dousland Barn in 1883 was located on the 10 1/2-mile (16.9 km) long single track branch railway line in Devon, England, running from Yelverton to Princetown with eventually four intermediate stops, three being halts and one at Dousland as a fully fledged station.

== History ==
The branch line was authorised in 1878 and opened on 11 August 1883. On opening the line ran from Horrabridge through Dousland to Princetown, however in 1885 Yelverton was opened and replaced Horrabridge as the start of the line Yelverton. Three other stops had been added to the line in the 1920s, Burrator and Sheepstor Halt in 1924, King Tor Halt in 1928, and Ingra Tor Halt in 1936. Much of the route followed the course of the old Plymouth and Dartmoor Railway. The freight traffic on the branch line included granite from the rail served quarries of Swelltor and Foggintor which were closed in 1906.

Owned by the Princetown Railway until 1 January 1922, the company then merged with the Great Western Railway (GWR). The line passed to British Railways (Western Region) in 1948 and closed on 3 March 1956.

The station did not have a passing loop being only a block post splitting the line into two sections. It had a goods yard, signal box, goods shed, and a level crossing with gates. The signal box near the level crossing was replaced by a signal box located on the platform in 1915. The signal box was renamed Dousland from Dousland Barn.

Much of the old track formation now forms the route of the Dousland to Princetown Railway Track, Dousland station house survives as a private dwelling and the platform is still visible.

There was a proposal reported in the Western Evening Herald in 1956 by a Mr P Morshead, supported by Lydford Parish Council, to purchase the track, re-lay it to narrow gauge and use three narrow gauge tank locomotives to run trains between Yelverton and Dousland in order to earn money to reopen the remainder of the line.

== Services ==
Preceding station	Disused railways	Following station
Yelverton; Line and station closed	Great Western Railway; Princetown Railway	Burrator and Sheepstor Halt; Line and station closed
