= Princetown railway station =

Former railway station in Devon, England

Princetown

General information
- Location: Princetown, West Devon; England
- Coordinates: 50.5435°N 3.9959°W
- Grid reference: SX5867273436
- Platforms: 1

Other information
- Status: Disused

History
- Original company: Princetown Railway
- Pre-grouping: Princetown Railway
- Post-grouping: Great Western Railway

Key dates
- 11 August 1883: Station opened
- 3 March 1956: Station closed
Location

Princetown railway station, opened in 1883 was the terminus of the 10 1/2-mile (16.9 km) long single track branch line in Devon, England, running from Yelverton with eventually four intermediate stops, three being halts and one at Dousland as a fully fledged station.

== History ==
The branch line was authorised in 1878 and opened on 11 August 1883. The station had a single platform, a passing loop, goods yard, signal box, goods shed, an engine shed for two locomotives, a 180 foot long carriage shed and a turntable.

Yelverton was the junction for the line when the station opened, three other stations were later added to the line : Burrator and Sheepstor Halt in 1924, King Tor Halt in 1928, and Ingra Tor Halt in 1936. Much of the route followed the course of the old Plymouth and Dartmoor Railway. The freight traffic on the branch line included granite from the rail served quarries of Swelltor and Foggintor which were closed in 1906.

The line was owned by the Princetown Railway until 1 January 1922, the company then merged with the Great Western Railway (GWR).

The station was host to a GWR camp coach in 1934 and 1938.

The line passed to British Railways (Western Region) in 1948 and closed on 3 March 1956. The station buildings were all demolished soon after closure.

Much of the old track formation now forms the route of the Dousland to Princetown Railway Track.

Preceding station	Disused railways	Following station
King Tor Halt; Line and station closed	Great Western Railway; Princetown Railway	Terminus
