= Princetown Railway =

Railway line in Devon, England

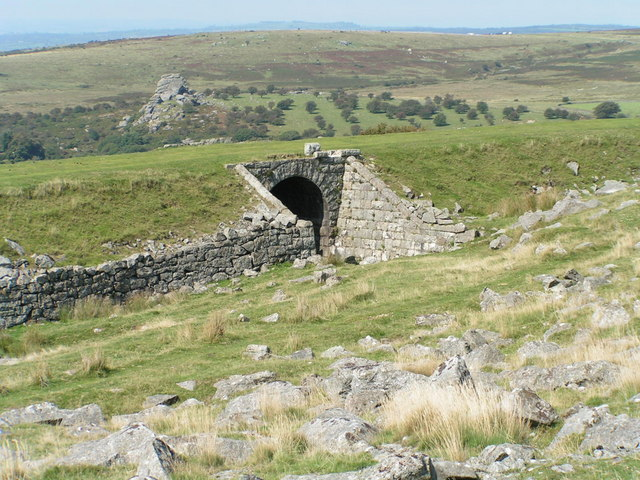
The remains of the line near King's Tor, nearby to Foggintor Quarry and Princetown

The Princetown Railway was a 10¼ mile single track branch railway line in Devon, England, that ran from Yelverton on the Plymouth to Tavistock line, to Princetown via four intermediate stations, Dousland, Burrator and Sheepstor Halt, Ingra Tor Halt and King Tor Halt. The line closed in 1956 and today forms part of a popular cycling and walking route.

== Origins ==
In 1823 the Plymouth and Dartmoor Railway had opened its line connecting Princetown with a wharf on the River Plym near Plymouth. The original intention of encouraging agricultural development of the moor had been frustrated, but the line was carrying considerable traffic in granite from quarries a little below Princetown. It used horses for pulling the wagons and had a distinct track gauge of 4 ft 6in (1,372 mm). It did not convey passengers.

In 1852 business interests were formulating the prospectus of the South Devon and Tavistock Railway Company (SD&TR), which was to connect Tavistock with the main line railway near Plymouth. They wrote that arrangements would also be made, if found desirable, to form a branch line to government establishments at Princetown. The Government establishments were of course Dartmoor Prison, then recently re-opened as a convict prison. The proposed branch was not proceeded with, and the SD&TR opened its line on 22 June 1859. It left the Exeter - Plymouth line of the South Devon Railway near Marsh Mills and ran northwards to Tavistock, passing through a tunnel under Roborough Down, near the settlement of Yelverton.

In 1874 an independent company proposed a branch line from Yelverton to Princetown, with a short branch there to the prison. This scheme failed to gain support.

Princetown Railway Act 1878
- Act of Parliament
- Parliament of the United Kingdom
- Long title: An Act for incorporating the Princetown Railway Company; and for other purposes.
- Citation: 41 & 42 Vict. c. ccxxix

Dates
- Royal assent: 13 August 1878

Text of statute as originally enacted

By now the Great Western Railway (GWR) had taken over the SD&TR line, and proposed a Princetown branch from Yelverton; it obtained powers by an act of Parliament, the Princetown Railway Act 1878 (41 & 42 Vict. c. ccxxix) on 13 August 1878, by which a nominally independent company, the Princetown Railway, was incorporated. The GWR was to work the line when built, and to have a controlling interest. Notwithstanding GWR sponsorship, the line was to be built on the standard gauge (4 ft 8½in, 1,435 mm).

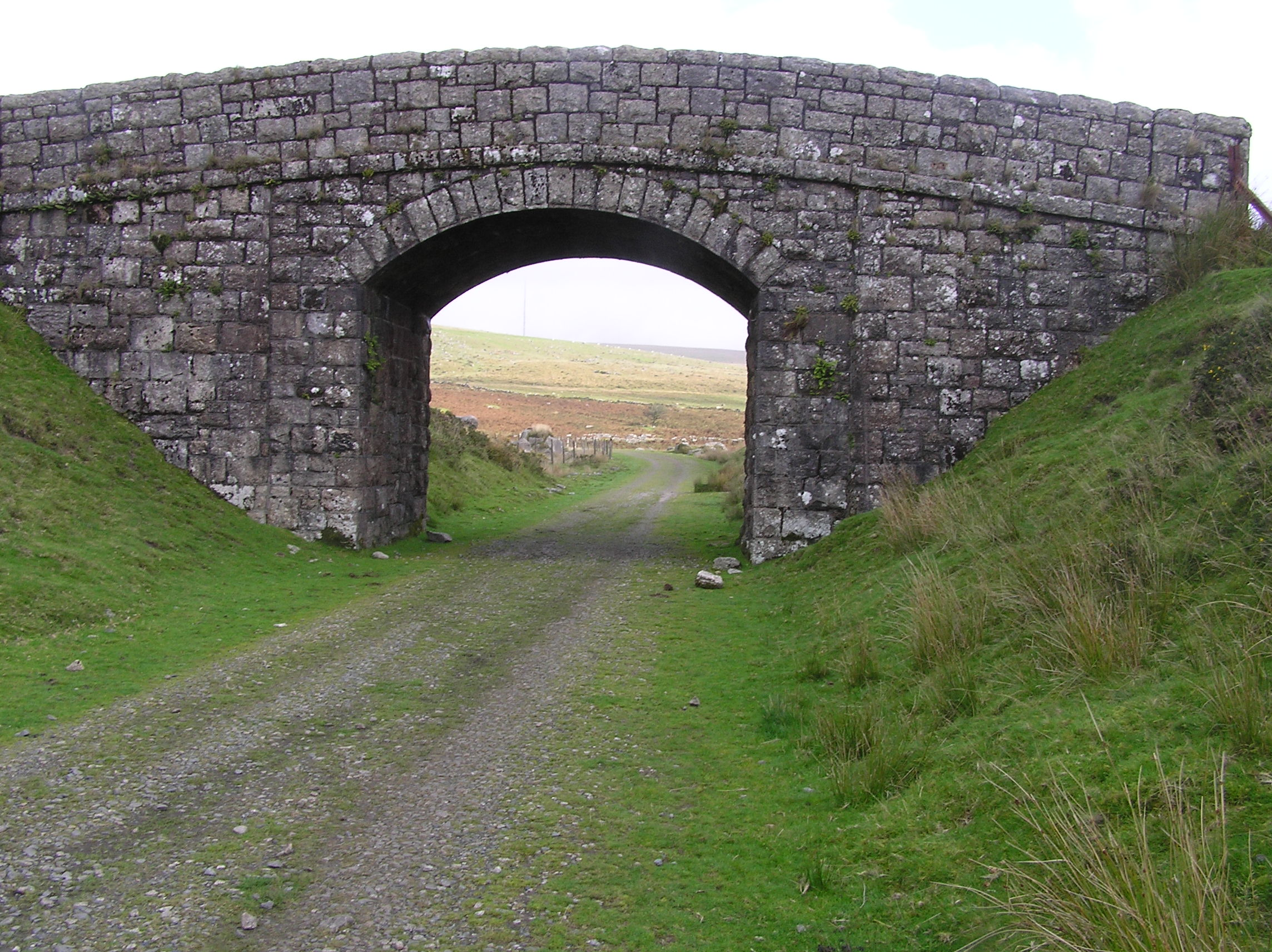
Princetown Railway overbridge at 18 milepost looking north-east

The line was to be 10¼ miles in length from Yelverton Siding (on the Plymouth to Tavistock line, at the south end of the tunnel) to Princetown. Adopting part of the route of the 1814 Plymouth and Dartmoor Railway and joining with the GWR, it made working arrangements with those companies and received subscription support from them towards its authorised capital of £60,000, with borrowing powers of £20,000.

The company purchased the upper section of the Plymouth and Dartmoor Railway (P&DR) for £22,000, in order to use the P&DR trackbed. It did so for much of the route, but it ran to the east of Yennadon Down. There were also a number of local realignments where very sharp tramway curves had to be smoothed for locomotive operation.

The line was evidently partly supported by the Home Office, as a financial grant towards the construction was expected to be made. It was also anticipated that convict labour might be used for the construction, but this was abandoned as impractical.

On 7 July 1883 Colonel Yolland of the Board of Trade made an inspection of the line, but found several issues to be unsatisfactory, and he refused the sanction to open. He made a second visit after alterations had been made, and the line opened without ceremony on 11 August 1883.

== Operation ==
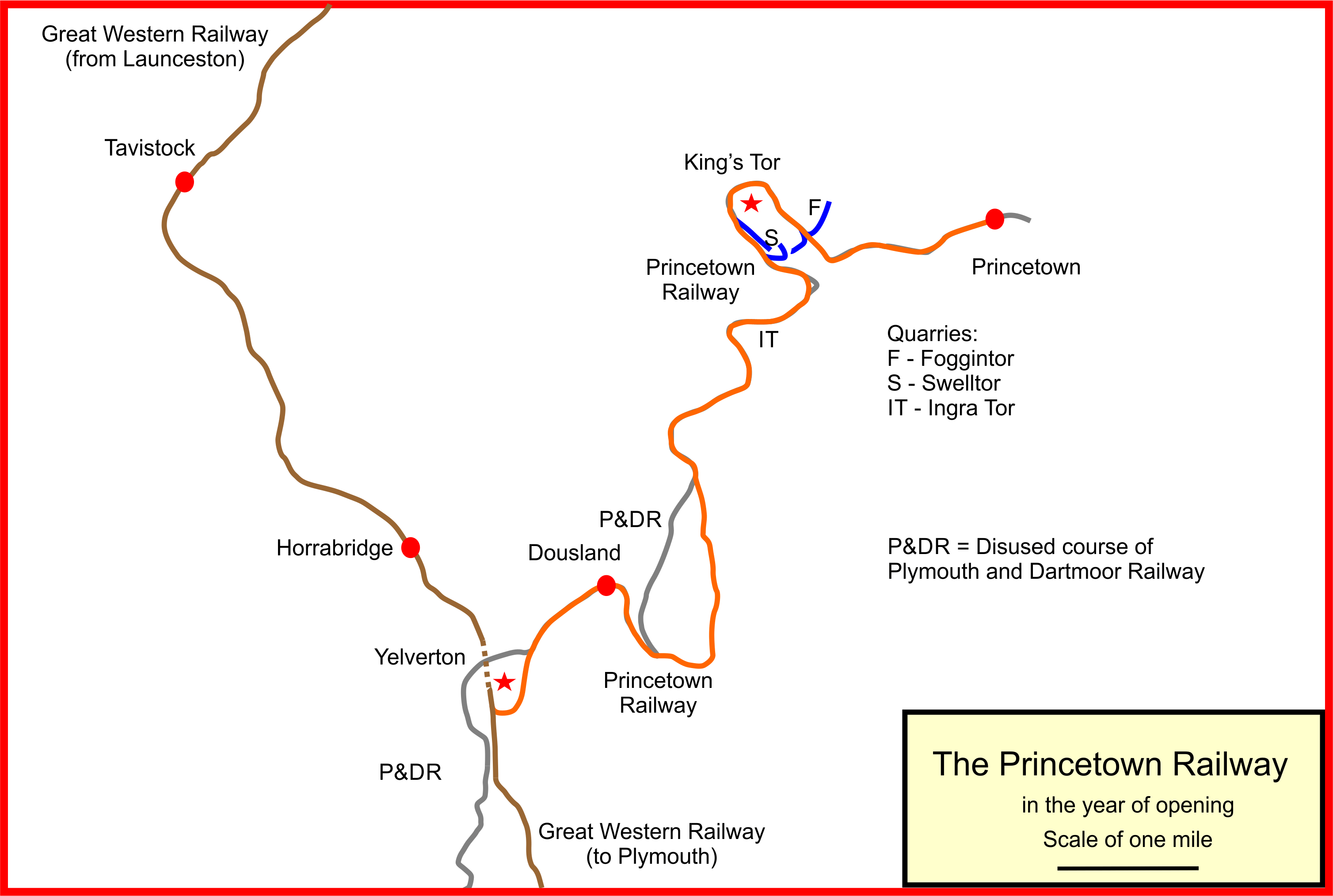
Map of the Princetown Railway in the year of opening

On opening, passenger trains ran from Horrabridge through Dousland to Princetown, as there was only a goods siding at Yelverton. Yolland had required that either a junction station should be provided at Yelverton, or that Horrabridge station should be extended to accommodate interchange traffic. For the time being Horrabridge served as the junction station, but the GWR opened a station at Yelverton on 1 May 1885, and from that time the branch passenger trains operated to and from that point.

The Tavistock line had been equipped with mixed gauge track (standard and broad gauge rails) to accommodate the trains of the London and South Western Railway (LSWR) and the Princetown branch trains were able to use the standard gauge rails; they also travelled through to Plymouth for servicing.

The ruling gradient was 1 in 40, rising almost continuously to Princetown, with short-radius curves, making locomotive operation difficult.

The branch line left Yelverton in a southerly direction and curved sharply east on a steeply rising gradient. Immediately at the platform end there was a spur siding which led back to a 23 ft 6 in (7.16 m) turntable. Normal operation in the twentieth century was that a train from Princetown arriving would unload and then be propelled empty up the gradient past the siding connection. The engine would then move into the spur and the coaches would be gravitated into the platform under the control of the guard.

Stations on the branch were:

- Dousland station — it was a block post and had a single platform.
- Burrator & Sheepstor Halt – opened on 4 February 1924, the area having become an attraction for ramblers as Burrator Reservoir is nearby.
- Ingra Tor Halt – opened on 2 March 1936.
- King Tor Halt – opened 2 April 1928
- Princetown – the terminus was at an altitude of 1,373 feet (418 m) feet above sea level.

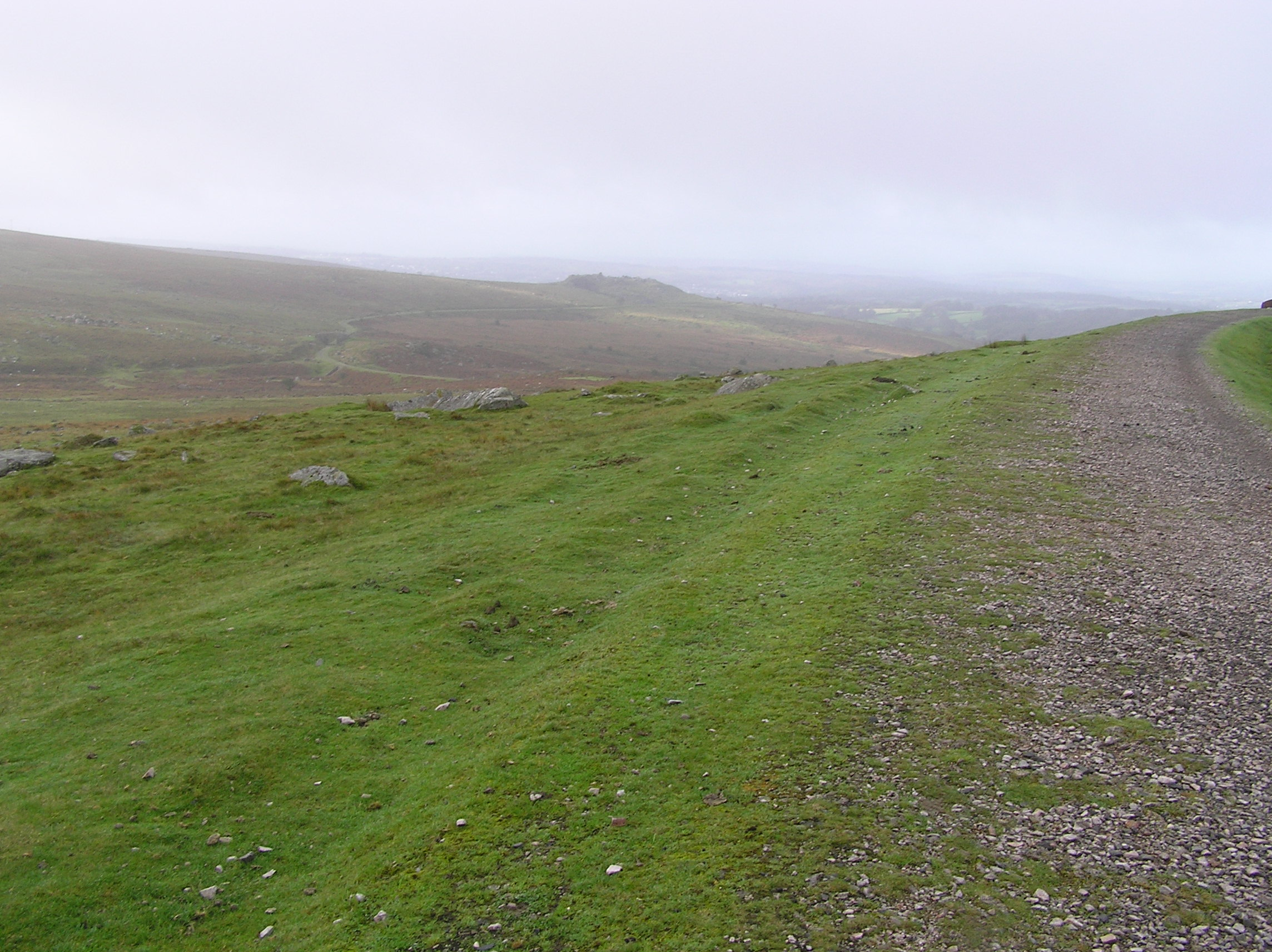
Near Foggintor looking south-west to the lower alignment below Kings Tor

There was a 23 ft 6 in (7.16 m) turntable at Princetown.

The motive power on the line in the twentieth century was almost exclusively the 44XX class of 2-6-2T; mixed train (passenger and freight combined) operation was commonly used.

== Traffic ==
Most of the traffic came from carrying prisoners, prison officers, and supplies for Dartmoor Prison, with some traffic from the quarries near the line, and also some excursion traffic. In 1924 Burrator Platform was opened for workmen employed on the raising of the Burrator and Sheepstor Dams.

Prisoners destined for the prison were no longer conveyed by the route after 1930 except during and just after World War 2, as the Southern Railway route to Tavistock and a road connection were more convenient. Two more halts (King Tor and Ingra Tor) were opened (in 1928 and 1936 respectively) to counter competition from local bus services and encourage tourist traffic.

In 1949 the service from Yelverton to Princetown comprised three passenger and two mixed traffic trains daily from Monday to Saturday, with an additional passenger train on Saturday. The service from Princetown to Yelverton comprised four passenger trains, with an additional passenger train on Saturday. There was also a mixed traffic train (Tuesdays, Thursdays, and Saturdays), and a freight train (Mondays, Wednesdays, and Fridays) which stopped only at Swell Tor siding (if required), Dousland, and Yelverton, before running on to Horrabridge.

== Ownership ==
The line was operated by the Great Western Railway, but owned by the Princetown Railway until 1 January 1922 when the Company amalgamated with the GWR. The line passed to British Railways in 1948 and closed on 3 March 1956.

== Preservation ==
Much of the disused trackbed now forms the Dousland to Princetown Railway Track walkway and rough cycle track.
