= King Tor Halt railway station =

Former railway station in Devon, England

King Tor Halt
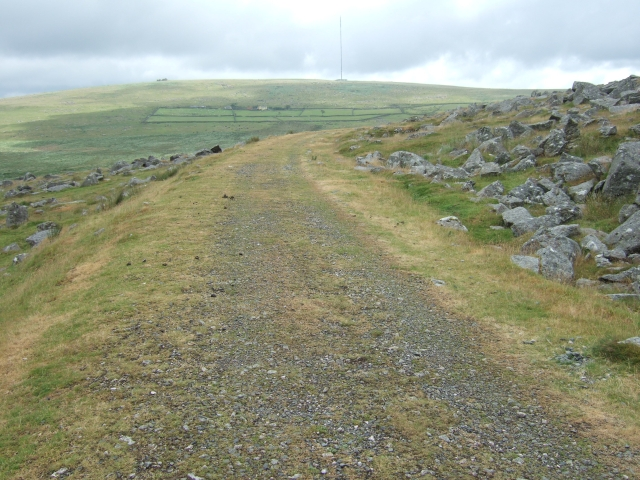
- The railway trackbed near the old station

General information
- Location: Princetown, West Devon; England
- Coordinates: 50.5409°N 4.0261°W
- Grid reference: SX5652473206
- Platforms: 1

Other information
- Status: Disused

History
- Original company: Great Western Railway
- Post-grouping: Great Western Railway

Key dates
- 2 April 1928: Station opens
- 3 March 1956: Station closed to passengers
Location

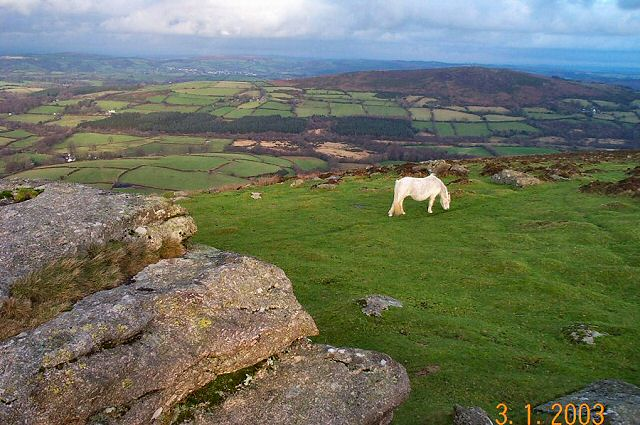
King Tor

King Tor Halt railway station was located on the 10 1/2-mile (16.9 km) long single track branch railway line in Devon, England, running from Yelverton to Princetown with four intermediate stations. It was opened with only a basic wood platform and shelter in connection with the adjacent granite quarry and the associated worker's houses. Its later traffic was entirely walkers and like Ingra Tor Halt it was retained in an attempt to counter competition from local bus services and encourage tourist traffic.

== History ==
The branch line was authorised in 1878 and opened on 11 August 1883. Yelverton was the junction for the line when the halt opened, three other stations had been added to the line in the 1920s, Burrator and Sheepstor Halt in 1924, Ingra Tor Halt in 1936. Much of the route followed the course of the old Plymouth and Dartmoor Railway. King Tor Halt was opened almost on the site of the old Royal Oak Sidings.

The freight traffic on the branch line included granite from the rail served quarries of Swelltor and Foggintor which were closed in 1906.

Owned by the Princetown Railway until 1 January 1922, the company then merged with the Great Western Railway (GWR). The line passed to British Railways (Western Region) in 1948 and closed on 3 March 1956. The track was lifted during winter of 1956/7.

Much of the old track formation now forms the route of the Dousland to Princetown Railway Track, and only the concrete base of the shelter at the halt remains.

== Services ==
Preceding station	Disused railways	Following station
Ingra Tor Halt; Line and station closed	Great Western Railway; Princetown Railway	Princetown; Line and station closed
