= Burrator and Sheepstor Halt railway station =

Former railway station in Devon, England

Burrator and Sheepstor Halt
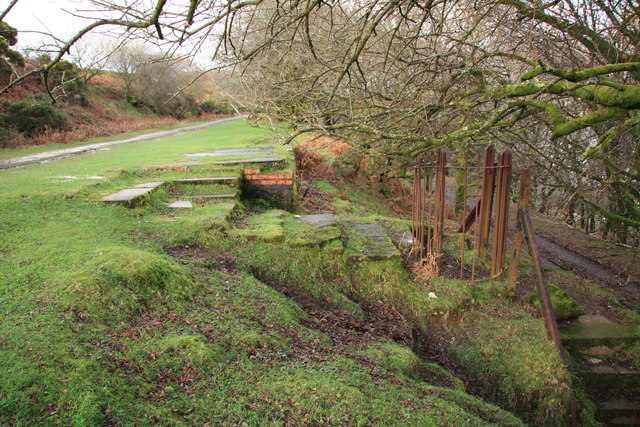
- The remains of Burrator and Sheepstor Halt

General information
- Location: Princetown, West Devon; England
- Coordinates: 50.4935°N 4.0458°W
- Grid reference: SX5498667972
- Platforms: 1

Other information
- Status: Disused

History
- Original company: Great Western Railway
- Post-grouping: Great Western Railway

Key dates
- 4 February 1924: Station opens as Burrator Platform for workmen
- 18 May 1925: Station opened to the public as Burrator Halt
- 1929: Renamed Burrator and Sheepstor Halt
- 3 March 1956: Station closed to passengers
Location

Burrator and Sheepstor Halt railway station was located on the 10 1/2-mile (16.9 km) long single track branch railway line in Devon, England, running from Yelverton to Princetown with eventually four intermediate stations. The station was opened as Burrator Platform and became Burrator Halt when it was opened to the public, the name being changed again in 1929 to Burrator and Sheepstor Halt.

Opened as Burrator Platform on Monday 4 February 1924 the station at first only catered for workmen employed on the raising of the Burrator and Sheepstor Dams when Burrator Reservoir was enlarged. This service consisted of a morning train that left Princetown at 6:27 am for Dousland and Yelverton and then, after collecting workmen off the 6:20 am from Millbay Station, left Yelverton Station at 6:58 am, stopping at Burrator and Sheepstor Platform at 7:05 am to set them down. On Mondays to Fridays the 4:05 pm from Princetown called at Burrator at 4:30 pm to pick up workmen for the homeward journey. On Saturday mornings the 12:25 pm from Princetown called at 12:50 pm to collect workers and the later train would then not stop.

From Thursday 6 November 1924 the early morning trains ran only on Monday mornings. The 4:05 pm from Princetown no longer called, but the return journey, the 4:55 pm from Yelverton did. For the remainder of the week the 7:38 am from Princetown conveyed the workmen to Burrator. Burrator and Sheepstor Platform was opened to the general public as from Monday 18 May 1925 and was served by trains during daylight hours only.

Its later traffic was almost entirely walkers and like Ingra Tor Halt it was retained in an attempt to counter competition from local bus services and encourage tourist traffic.

== History ==
The branch line was authorised in 1878 and opened on 11 August 1883. Yelverton was the junction for the line when the halt opened, three other stations had been added to the line in the 1920s, Ingra Tor Halt in 1936. Much of the route followed the course of the old Plymouth and Dartmoor Railway. King Tor Halt was opened almost on the site of the old Royal Oak Sidings.

The freight traffic on the branch line included granite from the rail served quarries of Swelltor and Foggintor which were closed in 1906.

Owned by the Princetown Railway until 1 January 1922, the company then merged with the Great Western Railway (GWR). The line passed to British Railways (Western Region) in 1948 and closed on 3 March 1956. The track was lifted in December 1956.

Only the foundations of the station remain, together with the old steps up from the lane and a swing gate. Much of the old track formation now forms the route of the Dousland to Princetown Railway Track.

== Services ==
Preceding station	Disused railways	Following station
Dousland; Line and station closed	Great Western Railway; Princetown Railway	Ingra Tor Halt; Line and station closed
