= Cann Quarry Canal =

Former canal in Devon, England

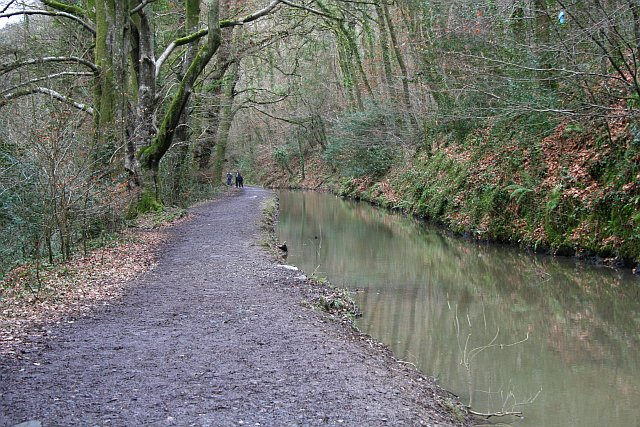
- Much of the canal is still visible
- Interactive map of Cann Quarry Canal

Specifications
- Status: abandoned

History
- Date of act: Privately built
- Date of first use: 1829
- Date closed: 1839

Geography
- Start point: Cann Quarry
- End point: Marsh Mills

The Cann Quarry Canal was a canal in Devon, England, which ran for just under 2 miles (3.2 km) from Cann Quarry to the River Plym at Marsh Mills. It opened in 1829, and a short tramway connected it to the Plymouth and Dartmoor Railway at Crabtree Junction. It had been replaced by a tramway within ten years, but continued to be used as a mill leat to supply Marsh Mills corn mill, and most of it is still visible.

== History ==
In 1778, the Cann Slate Quarry was owned by John Parker, and in order to make transport of the slate easier, he asked the engineer John Smeaton to survey a canal, to run from the quarry to the bridge at Marsh Mills. The River Plym between the bridge and Plymouth was navigable by barges. Although Smeaton carried out the work, he concluded that the canal, which would be 2.25 miles (3.62 km) long and would need several locks to accommodate the drop of 30 feet (9.1 m) in level, was unlikely to be economic, since the only trade would be the output from the quarry. He therefore suggested that a tramway would be a better solution, and could be built for about half the cost of the canal. Parker did not proceed with either option.

In 1819, an act of Parliament, the Plymouth and Dartmoor Railway Act 1819 (59 Geo. 3. c. cxv), was obtained which authorised the construction of a horse tramway between Princetown and Plymouth. In 1821, the directors of the Plymouth and Dartmoor horse tramway applied for a second act of Parliament, the Plymouth and Dartmoor Railway Act 1821, to authorise a deviation to the route, and in order to obtain consent for the new route from Parker's son, also called John Parker and Earl of Morley since 1815, they agreed to build a branch, possibly including an inclined plane, to the quarry. The company ran into financial difficulties, and the branch was not built. Despite the fact that he was a member of the management committee for the tramway, Parker took legal action against the three directors who had proposed the branch. They suggested that he should build the branch himself, and in return, all goods transferring from it to the existing tramway would be subject to lower tolls.

Parker proceeded to build a tub-boat canal from the quarry to Marsh Mills. It was about 6 feet (1.8 m) wide, and stopped above the bridge. He then wrote to the tramway company, suggesting that he was undecided whether to complete the canal by tunnelling under the turnpike road to connect it to the river, or to link it to their tramway at Crabtree by building a private branch. The letter resulted in an agreement on tolls, and the private tramway was built to complete the link. The canal was a little under 2 miles (3.2 km) long, and the tramway was about 0.5 miles (0.80 km) long. It crossed the river on a cast iron bridge with two arches.

The canal was opened on 20 November 1829. Some time after 1834 and before 1839, Earl Morley's tramway was extended up the valley to Cann Quarry. Near the quarry, it was built on the canal bank, but lower down it was built further to the west. Once it was opened, the canal ceased to be used as a navigation and served as a mill leat for the corn mill at Marsh Mills. A branch of the tramway, which was built to the unusual gauge of 4 ft 6 in (1,372 mm), was constructed from Plym Bridge to the quarries at Lee Moor, and the whole railway became known as the Lee Moor Tramway. The South Devon and Tavistock Railway built a branch up the Plym Valley, which was completed in 1854. For most of its route between Marsh Mills and the quarry, it was built between Earl Morley's tramway and the canal. The new railway cut across the quarry, which closed the following year. Marsh Mills corn mill continued to operate until 1927, when the owners became bankrupt.

== Route ==
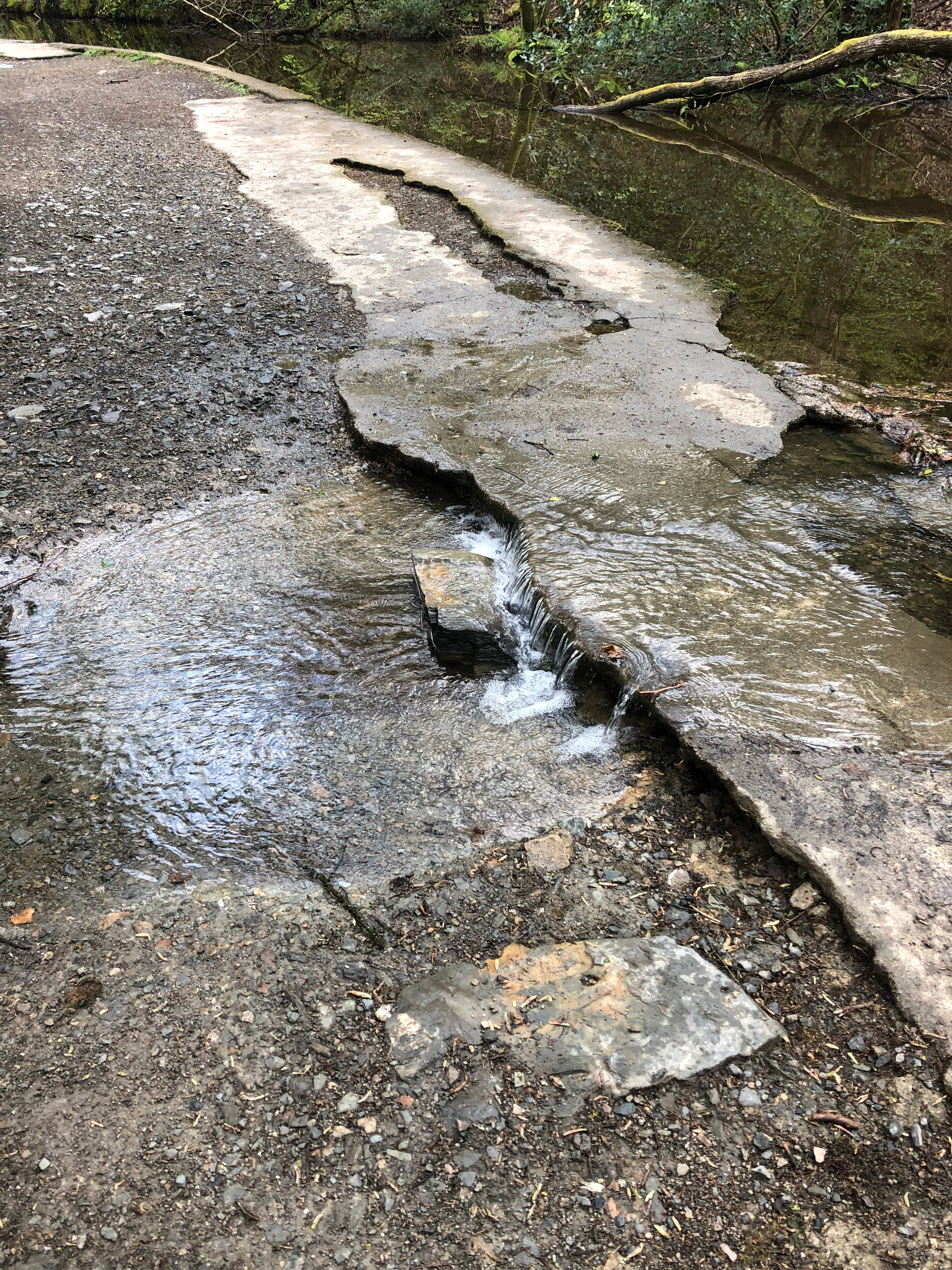
The towpath of the disused Cann Quarry Canal, Plymbridge, after rain

Crabtree Junction, where Earl Morley's Tramway joined the Plymouth and Dartmouth Railway, has disappeared, covered by a motel and the interchange between the A38 road and the A374 road, although the two-arched cast iron bridge over the River Plym remains. The tramway towards the quarry has become a cycleway and long-distance footpath, known as the West Devon Way, while most of the canal is still visible, and is often filled with water after rainfall, although the final section at Marsh Mills is not visible. The South Devon and Tavistock Railway branch was abandoned, but the lower end is now part of the Plym Valley Railway. The current Marsh Mills Station is a little further to the north than the original one, as a mineral line which serves a china clay works still passes through the old site. The Plym Valley Railway is being extended to Plym Bridge, where the Lee Moor incline branched off. The railway crosses the route of the canal in two places on this section, and both of the bridges have been rebuilt as part of the restoration. Beyond Plym Bridge, the cycleway leaves Earl Morley's tramway and follows the South Devon and Tavistock Railway instead, allowing it to cross the River Plym just beyond Cann Quarry, and continue on to Yelverton.

== Points of interest ==
Point	Coordinates (Links to map resources)	OS Grid Ref	Notes
Cann Quarry wharf	50.4167°N 4.0806°W	SX522594	Canal and tramway
Plym Bridge	50.4091°N 4.0784°W	SX524586	Tramway jn with Lee Moor branch
Rebuilt bridge 3	50.4024°N 4.0862°W	SX518579	Plym Valley Railway
Rebuilt bridge 2	50.4007°N 4.0860°W	SX518577	Plym Valley Railway
Marsh Mills corn mill	50.3924°N 4.0813°W	SX521567	southern terminus
Cast iron tramway bridge	50.3927°N 4.0835°W	SX519568	built 1823
Crabtree Junction	50.3903°N 4.0888°W	SX516565	End of Earl Morley's Tramway

== See also ==
- Canals of the United Kingdom
- History of the British canal system

== Bibliography ==
- Hadfield, Charles (1985). The Canals of Southwest England (2nd ed.). Newton Abbot, Devon: David & Charles. ISBN 978-0-7153-8645-3.
