= Ingra Tor Halt railway station =

Former railway station in Devon, England

Ingra Tor Halt
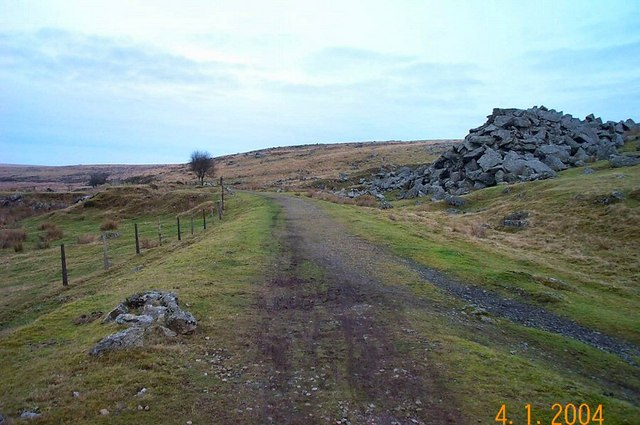
- Site of Ingra Tor Halt

General information
- Location: Princetown, West Devon; England
- Coordinates: 50.5318°N 4.0392°W
- Grid reference: SX5557272219
- Platforms: 1

Other information
- Status: Disused

History
- Original company: Great Western Railway
- Post-grouping: Great Western Railway

Key dates
- 2 March 1936: Station opens
- 3 March 1956: Station closed to passengers
Location

Ingra Tor Halt railway station was located on the 10 1/2-mile (16.9 km) long single track Princetown Railway in Devon, England, running from Yelverton to Princetown with four intermediate stations. It was opened with only a basic wood platform and shelter in connection with the short-lived re-opening of the adjacent quarry. Its later traffic was entirely walkers and it was retained in an attempt to counter competition from local bus services and encourage tourist traffic.

== History ==
The branch line, on which Ingra Tor Halt was a stop, was authorised in 1878 and opened on 11 August 1883. Yelverton was the junction for the line when the halt opened, two other stations had been added to the line in the 1920s, Burrator and Sheepstor Halt in 1924, King Tor Halt in 1936. Much of the route followed the course of the old Plymouth and Dartmoor Railway.

At the time of the opening of the halt in 1936 the single fares were: to Princetown, 11 1/2d First Class or 7d Second Class; to Burrator Halt, 9d and 5 1/2d; to King Tor Halt, 7 1/2d and 4 1/2d; to Dousland, 1s 1d and 7 1/2d; to Yelverton, 1s 5d and 10d; and to Plymouth, Millbay, 3s 8d and 2s 3d. A Cheap Day Return ticket to Plymouth cost 2s 3d Third Class; or to Princetown and back for 7d.

The main purpose for opening of the line was freight, h included substantial amount of granite from the quarries Swelltor and Foggintor which were closed in 1906.

Owned by the Princetown Railway until 1 January 1922, the company then merged with the Great Western Railway. It was the GWR which opened the Halt in 1936. At one time a sign at the halt stated that passengers should keep dogs on a leash due to the presence of adders. The notice is now in the Plymouth Railway Circle collection and can be seen in the Lee Moor Tramway Shed which is generally opened on special event days at Buckfastleigh Station on the South Devon Railway.

The halt remained open when the line passed to British Railways (Western Region) in 1948. It was closed along with the rest of the railway on 3 March 1956. The track was lifted in December 1956.

== Preservation ==
All wooden structures at the halt have been removed; only the concrete base of the halt's shelter remains. The former disused line is now part of the Dousland to Princetown Railway trail.

== Services ==
Preceding station	Disused railways	Following station
Burrator and Sheepstor Halt; Line and station closed	Great Western Railway; Princetown Railway	King Tor Halt; Line and station closed
