= Dousland =

Village in Devon, England

Coordinates: 50.49°N 04.07°W

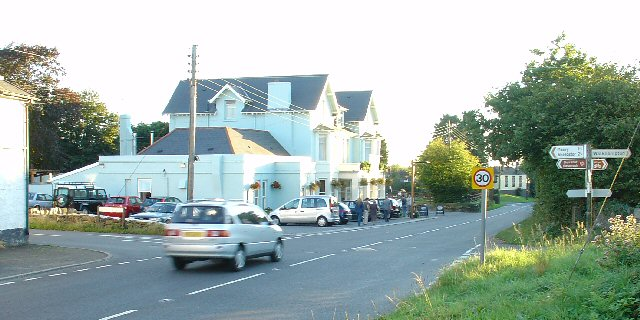
- The road junction and pub at Dousland

- Location within Devon
- OS grid reference: SX5368
- Civil parish: Meavy, Walkhampton
- District: West Devon
- Shire county: Devon
- Region: South West
- Country: England
- Sovereign state: United Kingdom
- Police: Devon and Cornwall
- Fire: Devon and Somerset
- Ambulance: South Western

Dousland is a small settlement in Devon, England. It is near the A386 road at Yelverton and is 10 kilometres (6 mi) northeast of the city of Plymouth by road. The northern part of the settlement is in Walkhampton parish, along the B3212 road from Yelverton to Princetown, and the southern part is in Meavy parish, along the road towards Meavy. Dousland is within the boundary of Dartmoor National Park.

Dousland had a railway station on the branch line to Princetown that opened in 1883 and closed in 1956. It was operated by the Great Western Railway until nationalisation took place. The station building is now a private dwelling and the platform still survives.

Dousland has a pub, the Burrator Inn.

The "Edwardian Lady" Edith Holden stayed regularly at Dousland between 1902 and 1910. Edith became friendly with the Trathern family who lived in Belbert Cottage. She frequently spent time on Yennadown with Berta and Bella Trathern. Edith noted " Up on the moor the world seemed to be made of sky and Gorse-such acres of fragrant Golden Blossom under a sky of cloudless blue".
