= River Plym =

River in Devon, England

Coordinates: 50°22′N 4°07′W

The upper part of the Plym estuary, known as the Laira

The River Plym is a river in Devon, England. It runs from Dartmoor in the centre of the county southwest to meet the River Meavy, then south towards Plymouth Sound. The river is popular with canoeists, and the Plym Valley Railway runs alongside a section of the river.

== Course ==
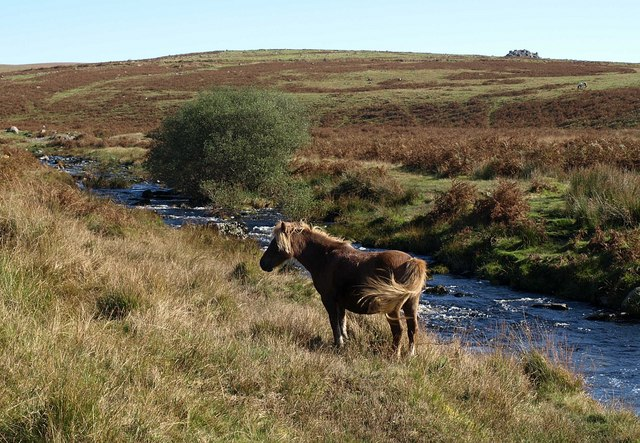
The river running across Dartmoor

The river's source is around 450 metres (1,480 ft) above sea level on Dartmoor, in an upland marshy area called Plym Head. From the upper reaches, which contain antiquities and mining remains, the river flows roughly southwest past clay workings at Shaugh Prior before the Dewerstone, where it meets the River Meavy. The course then changes to run southwards, between Plymouth and Plympton passing through the National Trust property of Plymbridge Woods and under the ancient Plym Bridge. Its upper tidal estuary is known as the Laira and the lower part is called Cattewater, which is navigable and leads towards Plymouth Sound. It is approximately 20 miles (32 km) long.

== History ==
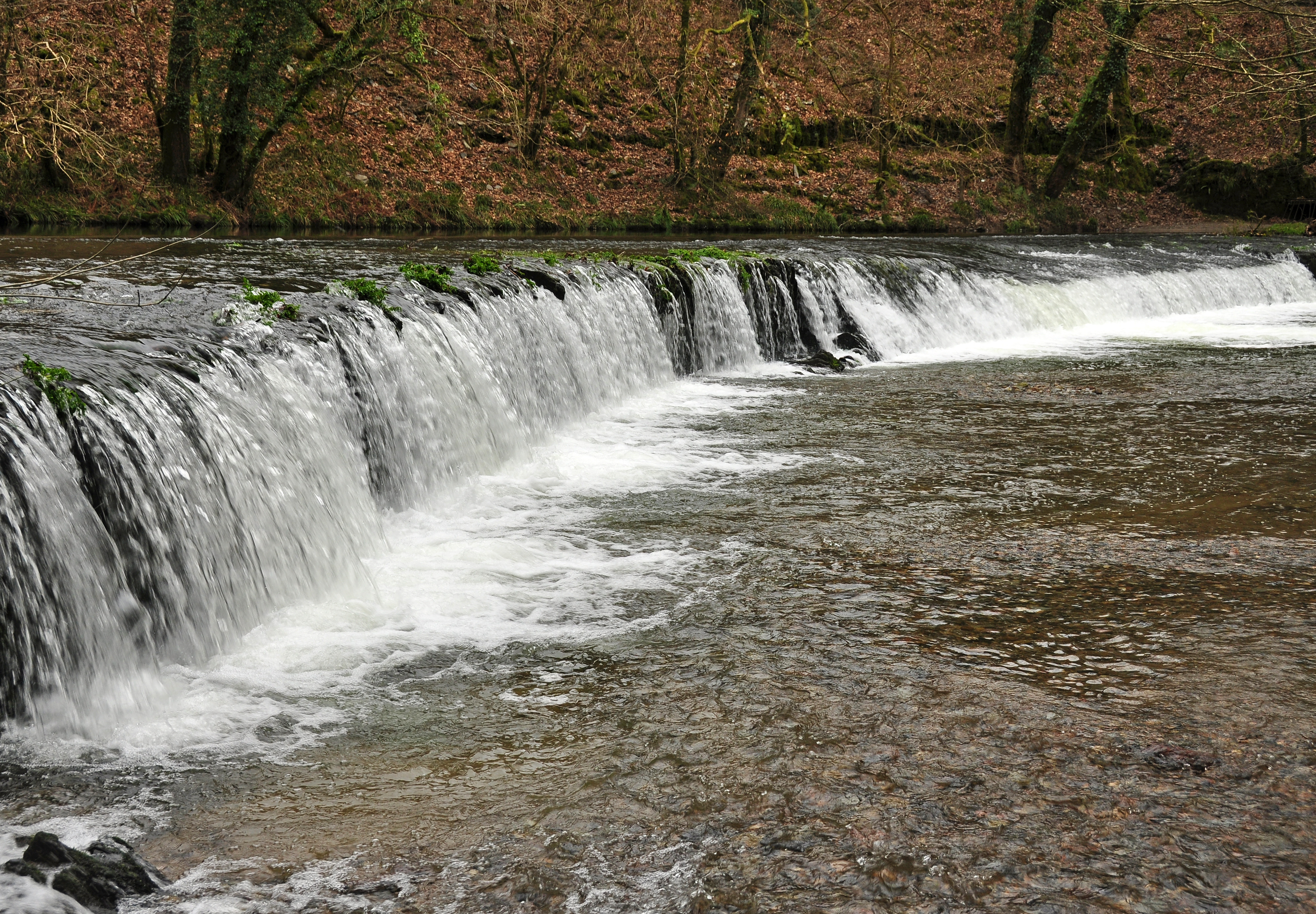
The only weir on the River Plym, near the former Cann Quarry Canal

HMS Plym, a River-class antisubmarine frigate, was named after the river during World War II. It carried out convoy escort duties in the North Atlantic and was later destroyed in the UK's first nuclear explosion.

When it was in operation, the Cann Quarry Canal left the river at Marsh Mills.

The Plym Valley Railway runs alongside the River Plym. It opened in 1856 as a section of the South Devon and Tavistock Railway, which followed the river as far as the tributary with the River Meavy. The line closed to passengers in 1962, and goods services stopped four years later. The new railway is a volunteer-run railway that operates steam and diesel-hauled train rides. The first section from Plym Valley from Marsh Mills station opened in 2001, with an extension to Lee Moor Crossing in 2008. In 2013, the line was extended to Plymbridge. The remainder of the line forms part of the Plym Valley Trail, a cycle route from Plymouth to Ilfracombe.

== Leisure ==
The River Plym is popular for canoeing. The upper section of Dartmoor from Cadover Bridge to Shaugh Bridge is considered challenging and has been described by the British Canoe Union as the hardest section of the river to navigate. It is often the first river to fill during heavy rain and one of the first to drop afterward. Experienced canoeists judge the water level carefully around the weather. This section has some pool drops, which are not recommended for novices. Lower sections beyond Shaugh Bridge to Bickleigh Bridge are easier to navigate past the first rapid, provided the river is at a sufficient water level.

In addition, the Plym is rich with brown trout, sea trout, and salmon. Angling is allowed in both lower and upper areas with much of the water being managed by Plymouth & District Freshwater Angling Association.

== See also ==
- Rivers of the United Kingdom
