= Plymouth and Dartmoor Railway =

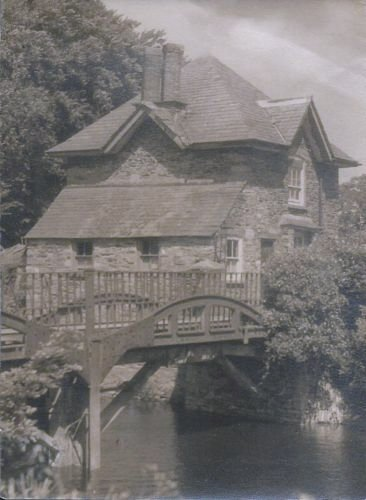
Marsh Mills bridge

The Plymouth and Dartmoor Railway (P&DR) was a 4 ft 6 in (1,372 mm) gauge railway built to improve the economy of moorland areas around Princetown in Devon, England. Independent carriers operated horse-drawn wagons and paid the company a toll. It opened in 1823, and a number of short branches were built in the next few years.

The Lee Moor Tramway (LMT) was opened as a branch of the original line in 1856; the extraction of china clay had become an important industry, and the LMT brought the mineral down to processing areas and to shipment at Plymouth. The LMT too operated with horse traction, in conjunction with steam locomotives and rope worked inclines.

The Omen Beam Tramway was an independent tramway for the gathering of peat from the moor above Dartmoor prison, for the manufacturing of naphtha.

The P&DR cost much more than the estimate and the intended generation of agriculture on the moor did not take place. The railway was dominated by a trading company who used it for bringing granite to Plymouth for coastal shipping transport. China clay deposits on Lee Moor were exploited and a branch of the P&DR was built to bring the mineral to Plymouth. The original P&DR line declined and its upper section was later adopted for the Princetown Railway branch line, but the LMT branch, and a short section of the lower end of the P&DR, remained in use until 1960. The line crossed the important Exeter to Plymouth main line on the flat, and many photographs have been circulated depicting the incongruous sight of the horse-drawn wagons crossing the busy main line railway.

== Origins ==
=== Conception ===
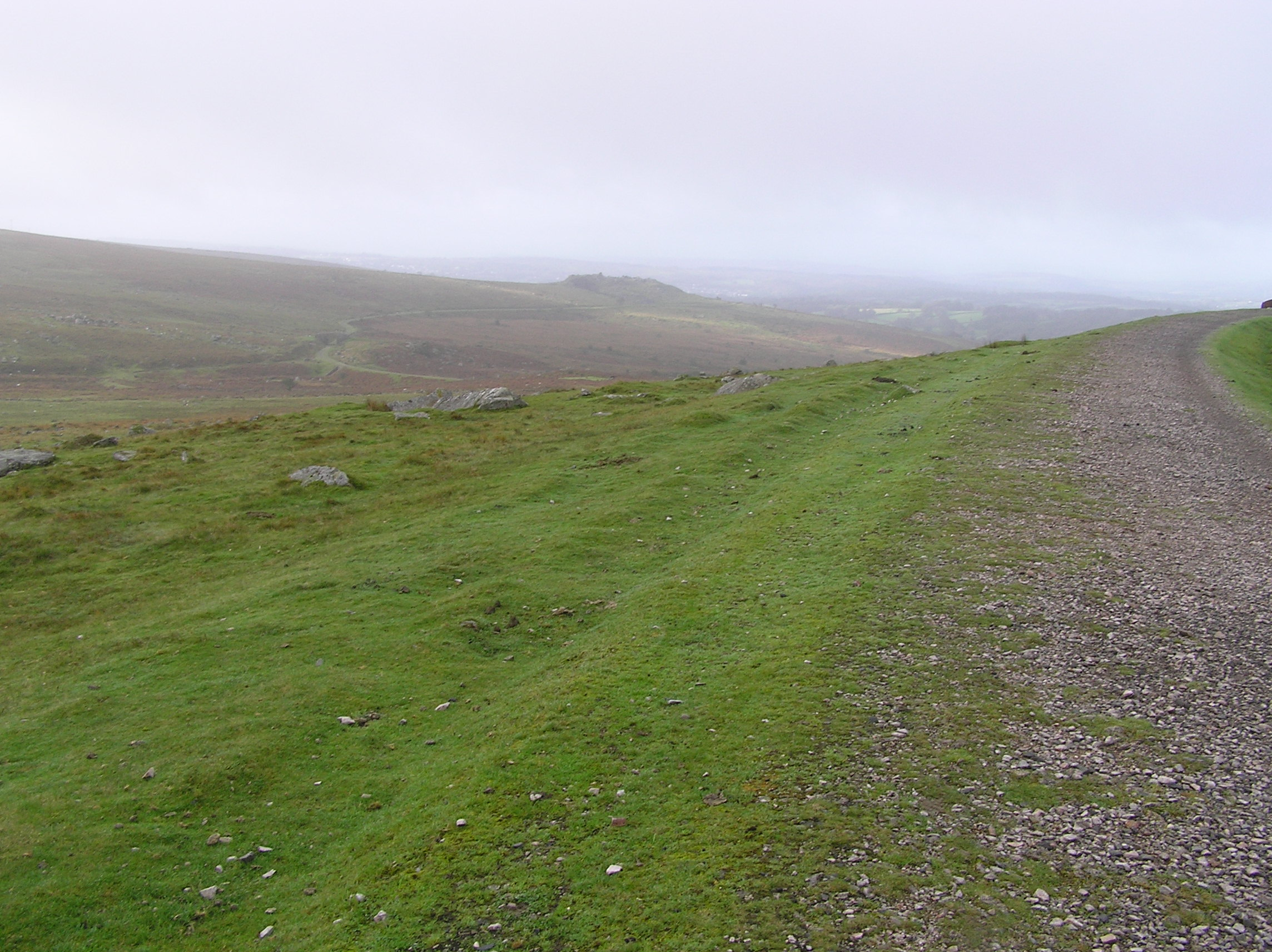
Near Foggintor looking south-west to the lower alignment

Sir Thomas Tyrwhitt was a substantial and philanthropic landowner in Devon and Cornwall. He had founded the settlement that he called Princetown, on Dartmoor, and he was anxious to improve the living conditions of the inhabitants. Dartmoor prison had been completed at Princetown in 1809 as a prisoner-of-war detention facility, but the peace following 1815 emptied the prison.

Tyrwhitt wished to improve agriculture and extractive industries on Dartmoor, and he conceived the idea of a railway to connect Princetown and Plymouth. This was to bring lime and sea-sand up to the Moor for the improvement of land, together with timber and coal. Granite, peat, mineral products and agricultural produce would be carried down. Goods would be conveyed in wagons drawn by horses, on the turnpike principle, in which all-comers might run their wagons on the railway on payment of a toll.

Plymouth and Dartmoor Railway Act 1819
- Act of Parliament
- Parliament of the United Kingdom
- Long title: An Act for making and maintaining a Railway or Tramroad from Crabtree, in the Parish of Egg Buckland, in the County of Devon, to communicate with the Prison of War on the Forest of Dartmoor, in the Parish of Lydford, in the said County.
- Citation: 59 Geo. 3. c. cxv

Dates
- Royal assent: 2 July 1819

Other legislation
- Repealed by: Plymouth and Dartmoor Railway Act 1865

Status: Repealed

Text of statute as originally enacted

He put forward proposals at Plymouth Chamber of Commerce in 1818 suggesting an 18% return on capital, and obtained subscribers, and a line was surveyed by William Shillabear of Walkhampton, a schoolmaster and surveyor. William Stuart was the engineer supervising the construction of the Plymouth Breakwater at the time, and this had a primitive internal tramway at the stoneyard. Stuart provided a cost estimate for the construction, and a parliamentary bill was submitted to form the Plymouth and Dartmoor Railway, with Stuart as its engineer. It was incorporated by the Plymouth and Dartmoor Railway Act 1819 (59 Geo. 3. c. cxv) on 2 July 1819 with capital of £27,783, authorising it to build from Crabtree to Princetown. (Note: Carter refers to the company as the Plymouth and Dartmoor Tramroad, and Gillham refers to the Plymouth & Dartmoor Tramway (in Dart's book). The original company seal, illustrated in Kendall, names it the Plymouth and Dartmoor Iron Railroad.)

Tyrwhitt ceremonially laid the first rail on 12 August 1819, but in fact contracts had not yet been let for the construction, and some re-appraisal of the engineering of the railway was to intervene. At a committee meeting on 26 July 1819 Stuart had been instructed to re-survey the line.

=== Extension to Sutton Pool, and first contracts ===
Plymouth and Dartmoor Railway (Crabtree and Sutton Pool Branch) Act 1820
- Act of Parliament
- Parliament of the United Kingdom
- Long title: An Act for making a Branch Railway or Tram Road from a Place called Crabtree, in the Parish of Egg Buckland, to certain Lime Works at a Place called Catdown, and from thence to Sutton Pool, in the Parish of Charles, all in the County of Devon, to communicate with the Plymouth and Dartmoor Railway, at Crabtree aforesaid.
- Citation: 1 Geo. 4. c. liv

Dates
- Royal assent: 8 July 1820

Other legislation
- Repealed by: Plymouth and Dartmoor Railway Act 1865

Status: Repealed

Text of statute as originally enacted

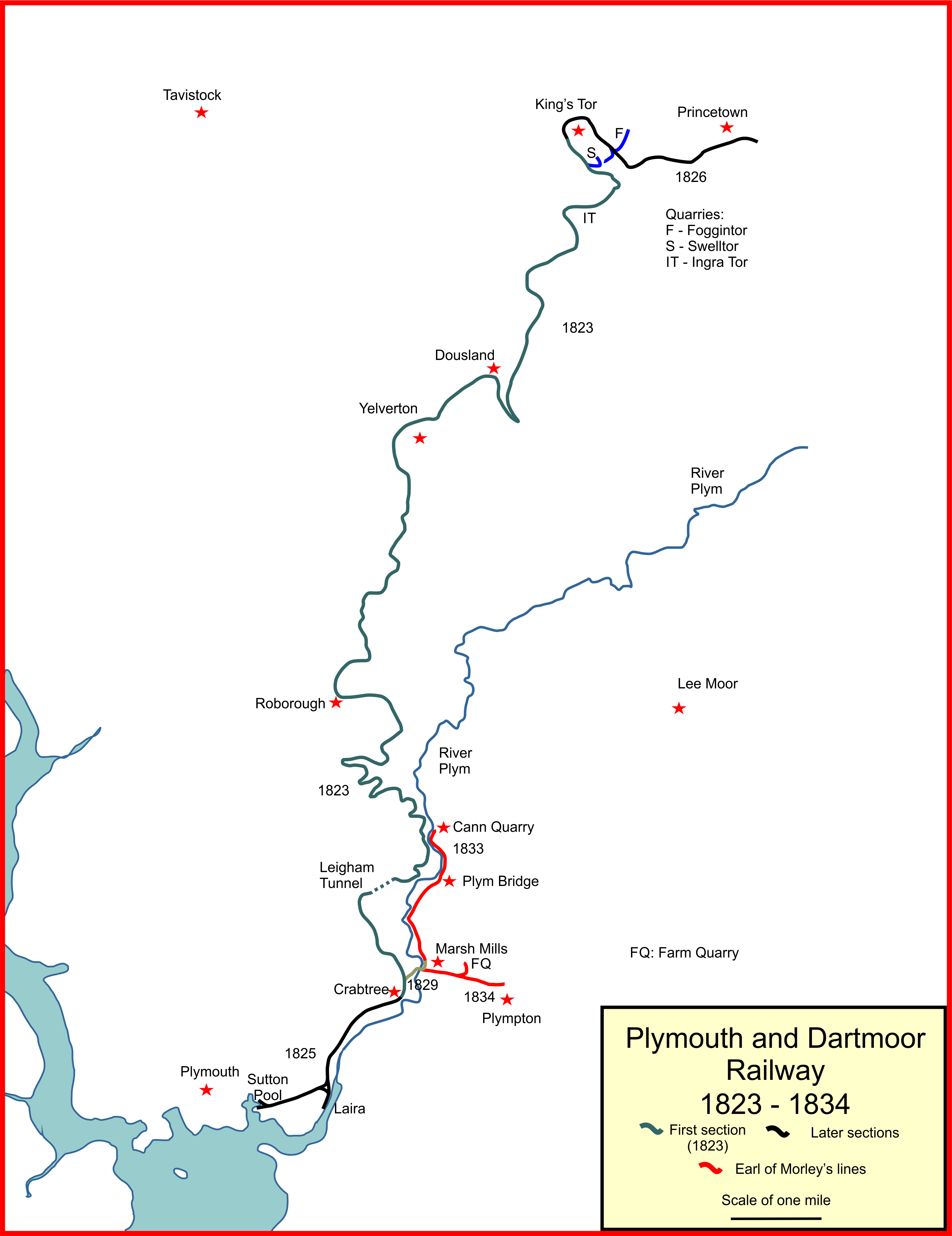
The Plymouth and Dartmoor Railway as built, 1823 to 1834

The line was to run from Crabtree to Princetown; Crabtree was chosen because it gave access to tidal water, at a small dock on the River Plym near the Rising Sun Inn there. The location was about 2 1/2 miles (4.0 km) east of the centre of Plymouth. However, the wharf would only be accessible at high tide and the river approach was lengthy and awkward, and it was decided to extend the course of the railway westward to reach Sutton Pool. Accordingly, a further act of Parliament, the Plymouth and Dartmoor Railway (Crabtree and Sutton Pool Branch) Act 1820 (1 Geo. 4. c. liv), passed on 8 August 1820, was needed authorising the extension, and also a branch to the Cattewater. This added £7,200 to the projected cost of the line. The whole of this extension was referred to as the branch railway, being considered a branch from Crabtree. William Stuart was now appointed to superintend the construction. At this time the company had contemplated acting as dealers in granite, that is suppliers of the mineral at Plymouth, rather than simply carriers. There is reason to believe from committee minutes that they intended to do so, but the necessary clauses were not inserted into the 1820 act.

In April 1820, contracts had been let to William Bailey for the supply of cast iron rails; they were to be of the fishbelly pattern 2 ft 10 in (860 mm) long and 6 inches (150 mm) deep; they were to be butt jointed at the supports on stone blocks. The gauge was to be 4 ft 6 in (1,372 mm), it is not clear who chose this, or why.

A contract for the construction of the formation was let to Hugh McIntosh of London in June 1820, for 9s 3d per yard; it was to be a single line with a number of passing sidings (referred to as "turnouts")—two per mile. Some sidings – at least at Roborough and Yelverton – were to be constructed of granite blocks dressed so as to provide a flange guide, similar to the construction of the main line of the Haytor Granite Tramway.

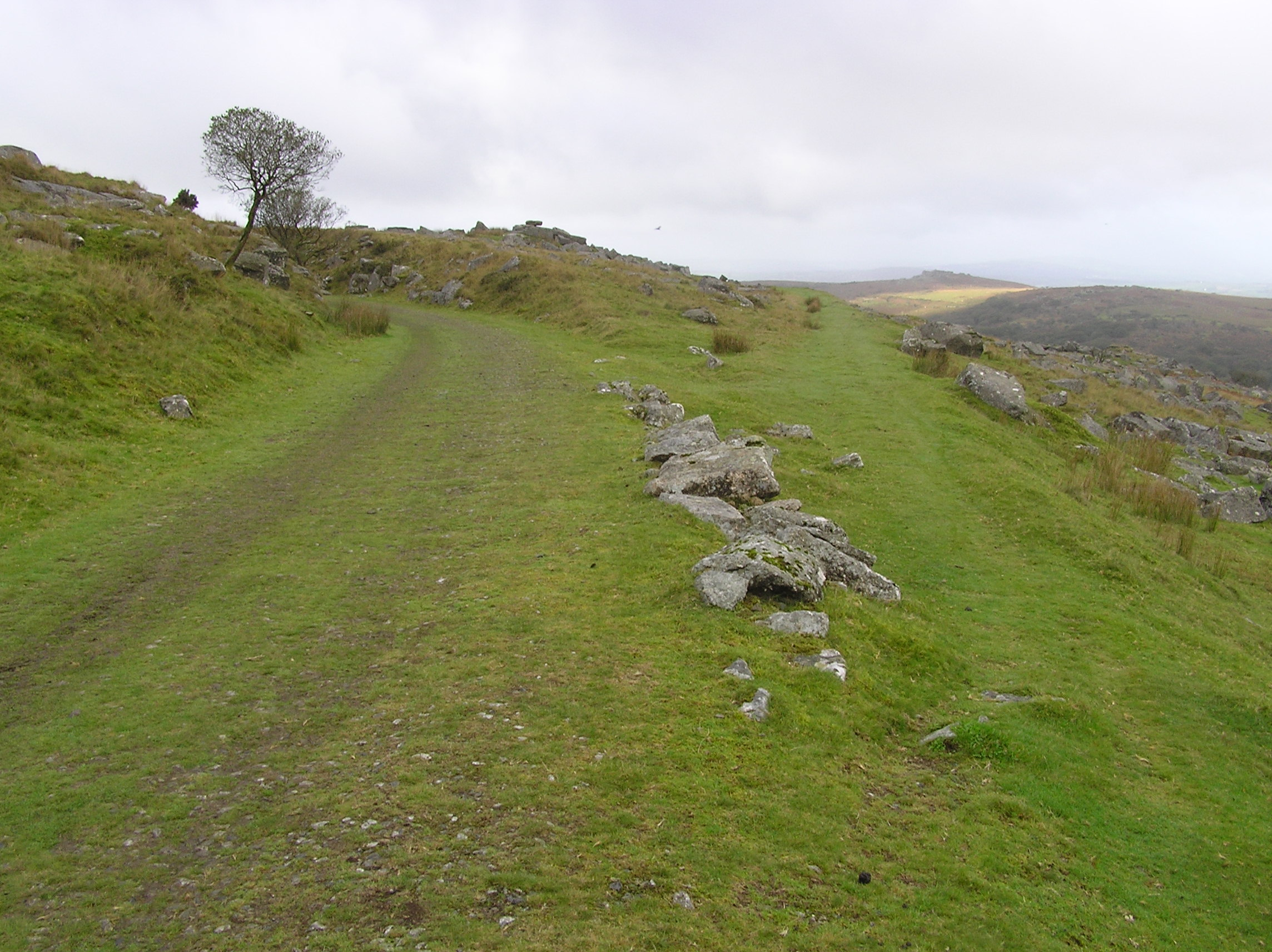
North of Kings Tor; the P&DR route goes straight ahead, and the later Princetown Railway route turns left

On 21 September 1820 the committee signed a momentous agreement with the firm of Johnson and Bryse. They had acquired tenancy rights to extract granite from Dartmoor and needed to bring it down to Plymouth for use there in the breakwater project, and to coastal shipping for onward transit. They would pay a flat rate of 2s 6d per ton irrespective of distance for a volume averaging 8,000 tons per annum: a steady income of £1,000 a year for the company. This was ratified at a meeting of all the proprietors on 3 March 1821.

=== Alteration to the main route ===
Plymouth and Dartmoor Railway Act 1821
- Act of Parliament
- Parliament of the United Kingdom
- Long title: An Act to authorize the Plymouth and Dartmoor Railway Company to vary the Line of a certain Part of the said Railway; and to amend the Acts passed for making the said Railway.
- Citation: 1 & 2 Geo. 4. c. cxxv

Dates
- Royal assent: 2 July 1821

Other legislation
- Repealed by: Plymouth and Dartmoor Railway Act 1865

Status: Repealed

On 26 December 1820 the engineer Stuart reported that Shillabear's route as far as Jump (later called Roborough) which ran via Fursdon was too steep for horse traction. He proposed a variation of the route on "Mr Archer's Land" that would reduce the gradient from 22" to 18" in the chain. (From 1 in 36 to 1 in 44; Kendall comments "as opposed to the estimated 1 in 72 maximum".) This required a further revision of the route immediately after obtaining the second act of Parliament, and after the letting of contracts for construction, and Stuart's report was unwelcome. Some embankment works near Roborough had already been undertaken. The committee held Stuart responsible and brought in Roger Hopkins as assistant engineer. In due course a new route with easier gradients was surveyed and approved; its course ran to the east of the earlier proposed route, but required a tunnel (Leigham Tunnel) and added a further £5,000 to the cost of the line. An act of Parliament, the Plymouth and Dartmoor Railway Act 1821 (1 & 2 Geo. 4. c. cxxv), authorising this was passed on 2 July 1821. The total estimated cost thus became £40,000 and the length 25½ miles (41 km).

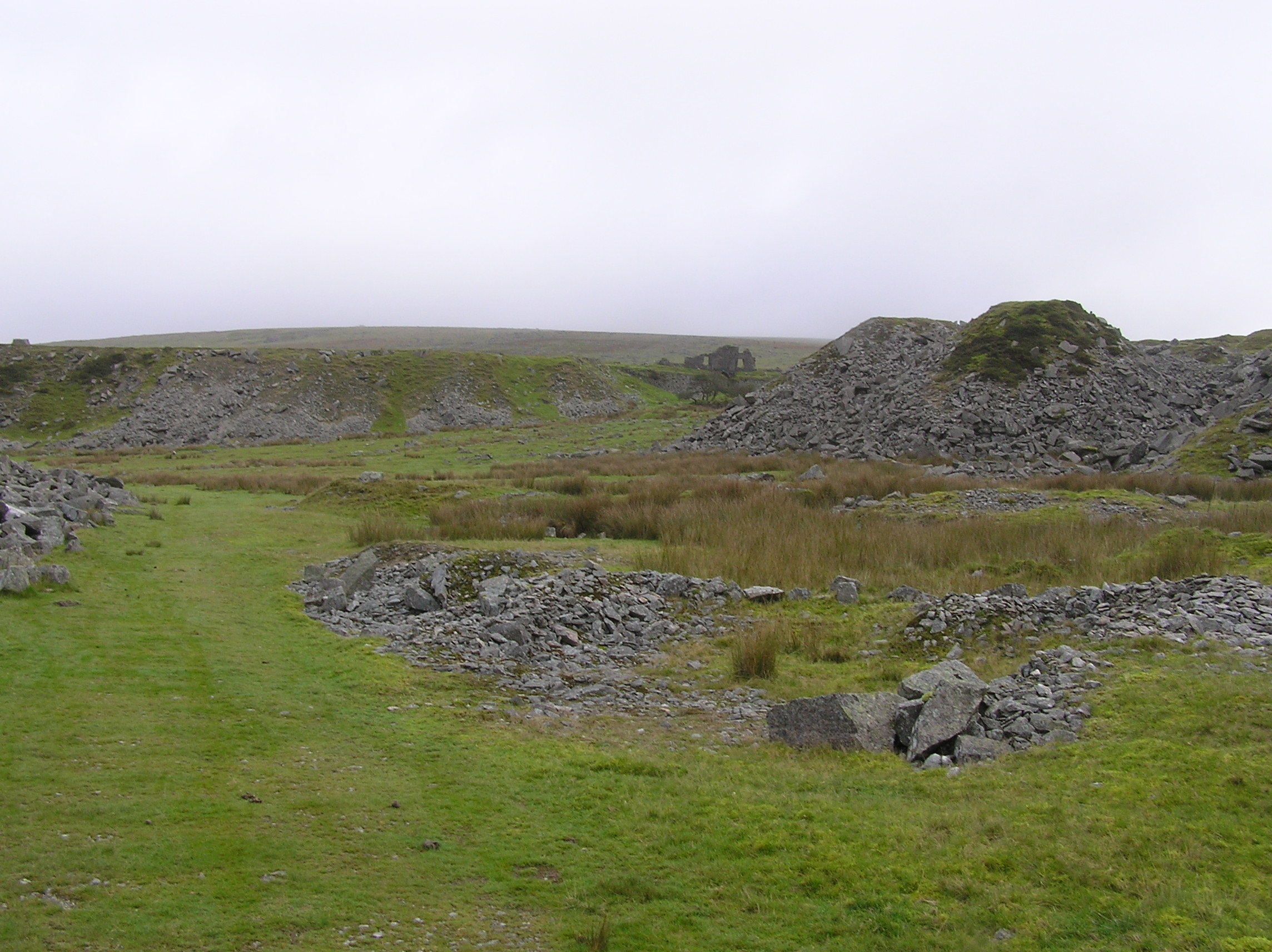
Foggintor quarry looking north

The new route needed to pass through the lands of the Earl of Morley, and he had a slatestone quarry at Cann; this was not far from the proposed line, but at a lower level in steeply sloping terrain, and the other side of the River Plym. He demanded a connection from the line to serve the quarry, and this was formally (but perhaps injudiciously) agreed to by three committee members on 6 June 1821 without reference to the full Committee. The connection might be a conventional branch line, or an incline crossing the Plym.

The engineer William Stuart engaged in a dispute with the committee over responsibility for the route selection, and was dismissed in October 1821. The contractor McIntosh was also dismissed amidst controversy over construction standards in June 1822, and Johnson Brothers (as successor to Johnson & Bryse) took over the work. Hopkins was now in charge as sole Engineer, he modified the specification for the later batch of rails; they were to be 3 ft 10 in (1,170 mm) long, with lapped joints at the sleeper blocks.

== Opening, and extensions ==
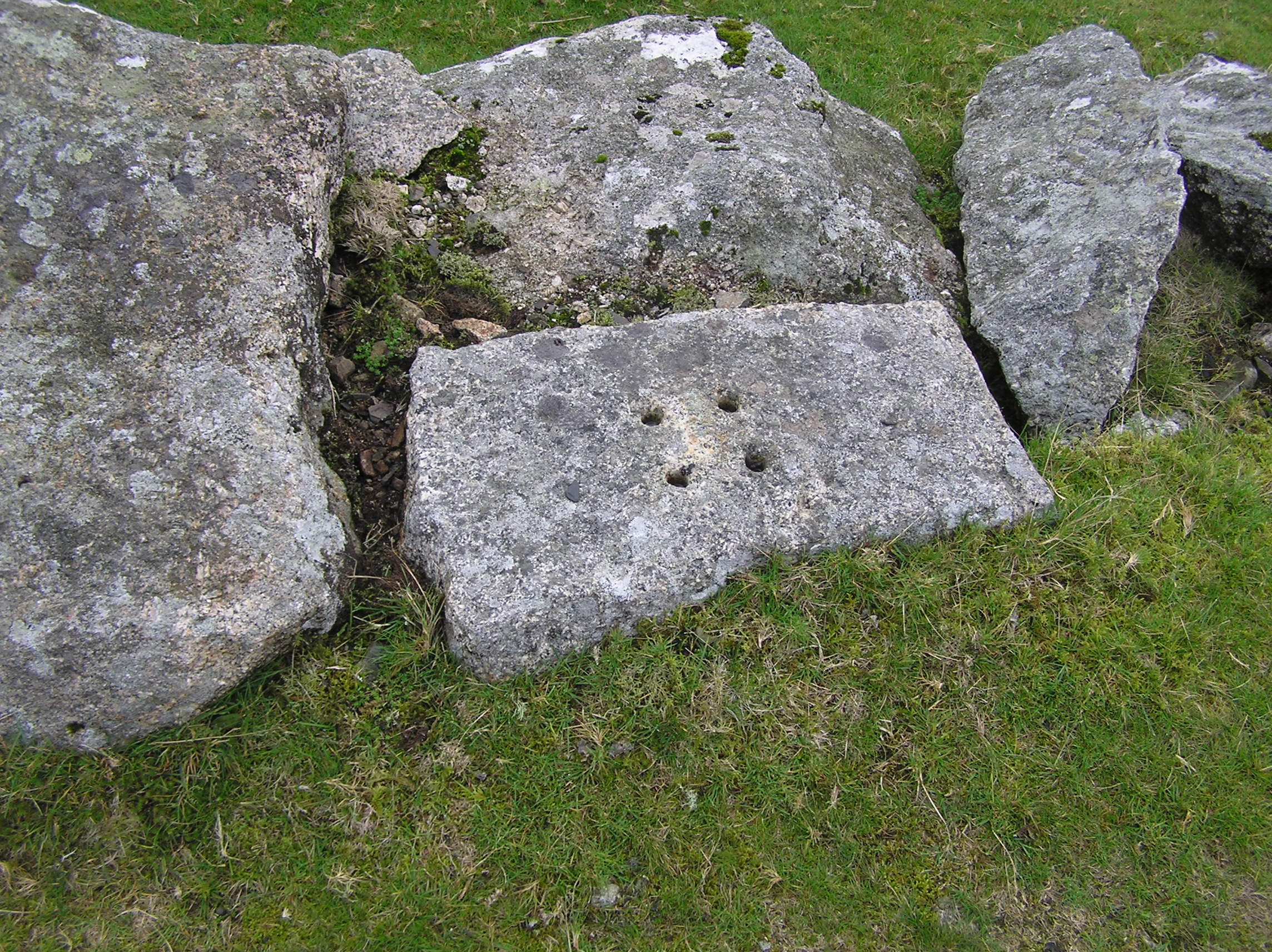
The finances of the company during the construction phase had been extremely difficult, and work had only been kept going by repeated Exchequer Loans and other financial arrangements. There must therefore have been considerable relief when the line was opened on 26 September 1823 with a celebration breakfast. The opening was between Crabtree and the foot of Kings Tor, Walkhampton. (Note: Authorities are imprecise about the extent of the first opening. The most thorough works are probably Kendall, and also Shepherd, who on page 51 simply refers to "Opening Day" without indicating the extent. On the same page he says that "the extensions at each end of the line—to Sutton Pool in the south and to Princetown in the north—were completed in December 1825 and December 1826 respectively". However his map of the line on page 9 shows "original terminus of the line" at Crabtree. Dart, in "Devon Narrow Gauge" says on the page following plate 21, that "In 1825 the line was extended to Sutton Harbour, with a branch to Laira (Martin's) Wharf. The section from the quarries to Princetown opened in 1826." (Laira is on the Cattewater, a location also referred to.) Dart reproduces part of a map prepared by J. C. Gillham which shows the line at Sutton Harbour (actually Bayly Wharf and Lockyer's Quay), forked and straddling "tidal mud"; this is labelled "Plymouth & Dartmoor Tramway Sutton Harbour Branch Opened 26 Sept 1823." The branch to "Laira Wharves" is marked "Terminus of Lee Moor Tramway" and "LMT opened 1825". In the caption to another map at plate XVII they say "When opened in 1823, the Plymouth & Dartmoor Railway ran both to Laira Wharf and Sutton Pool.” A sleeper block near King's Tor Mitchell and Smith in "Branch Lines Around Plymouth", caption to map XVII, say "When opened in 1823, the Plymouth and Dartmoor Railway ran both to Laira Wharf and Sutton Pool. Williams and Lee (in The Railway Magazine, March 1934), say that "From Sutton Pool, the Plymouth terminus, to King's Tor, a couple of miles short of Princetown, the line was opened with a procession on September 26, 1823". Priestley writing in 1831 refers to the line running to "Crabtree in the parish of Egg Buckland, where it crosses the turnpike road from Plymouth to Exeter, and where the original line terminated". As contracts were let in 1820 for the originally intended extent (from Crabtree) before the 1821 act of Parliament authorised the westward extensions, it might be concluded that the impecunious company opened to Crabtree first, in 1823, and extended to Sutton Harbour and Laira in 1825. At the northern end, Shepherd refers to "the quarries" at Walkhampton; the King's Tor quarry was on the high ground within the northward loop of the line when later completed. Given the shortage of money it seems likely that the temporary northern terminus was on the approach to Kings Tor; there are indications on the earliest available Ordnance Survey map (1884) that support this.)

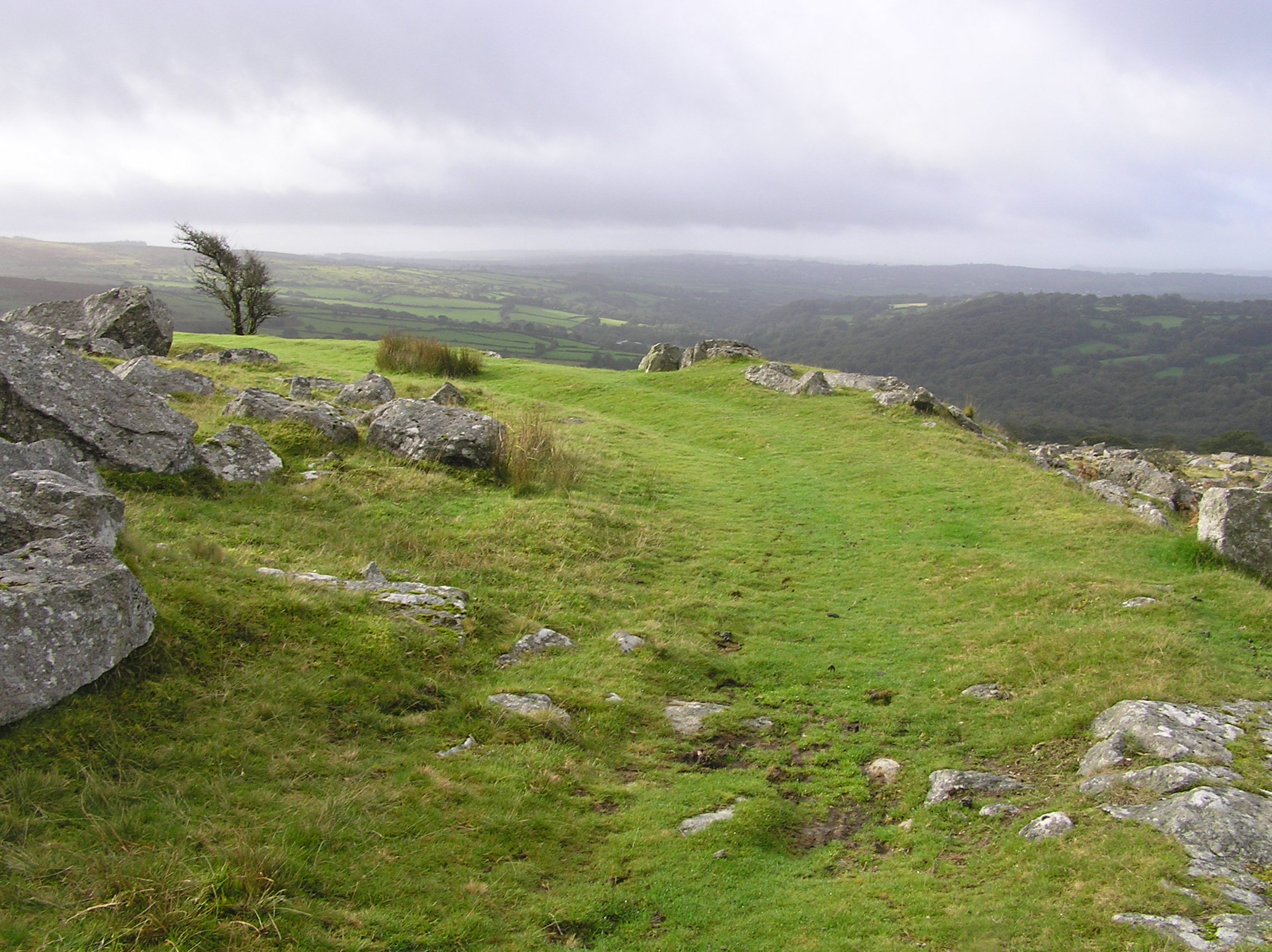
P&DR route north-west of Kings Tor; the later Princetown Railway ran on a different alignment here

The line followed a sinuous course to maintain a gentle falling gradient towards Plymouth: in a straight line the distance was 13 miles (21 km). The track gauge was 4 ft 6 in (1,370 mm) and the rails were bolted to cast iron chairs on stone blocks. The Leigham tunnel was 620 yards (570 m) long and there was one stone arch road bridge near Plym Bridge over the Roborough to Plympton road.

John and William Johnson were the operators of the quarries at Walkhampton, and the company soon found that their traffic dominated the income of the line: the hoped-for agricultural and general merchandise traffics had not materialised. Moreover, the company had expended all the capital that they had, and indeed were unable to repay the exchequer loans they had taken out. The extensions to Sutton Pool and to Princetown were therefore carried out by the Johnson Brothers as contractors, and in return they took a mortgage on the company and were able to offset their tolls against the sums due. In this way the line was completed to Princetown itself in 1826. The Princetown terminus was a few hundred yards east of the later Great Western Railway station.

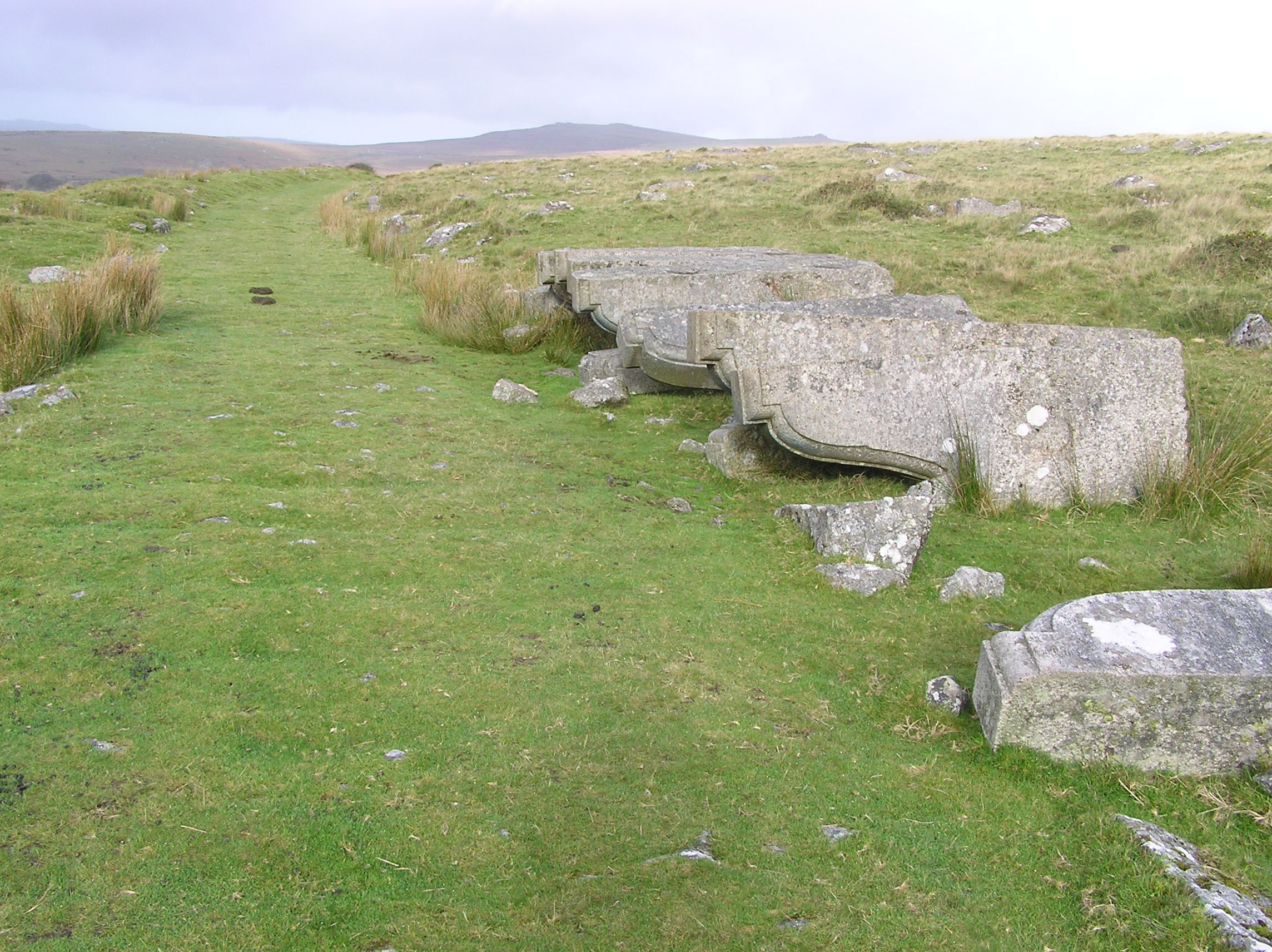
Corbels at Royal Oak; cut but never delivered

The Earl of Morley had granted land for the line conditionally upon a branch line being constructed to his quarry in Cann Wood, and he exerted pressure on the company to comply. However, in fact he converted an existing leat into a canal, the Cann Quarry Canal from his quarry to near Marsh Mills, and the Plymouth and Dartmoor Railway built a half-mile branch from near Crabtree to a basin on the canal. These works opened either on 20 November 1829 or 20 January 1830. This required transshipment from canal to the Railway, and boat operation on the fast flowing converted leat was difficult; the branch was extended northwards to Plymbridge mostly on the towpath of the canal, in 1833.

Morley also had interests in the extraction of china clay (a form of kaolinite) at Lee Moor, somewhat to the north-east of Marsh Mills, and he arranged with Johnson Brothers for them to extend the P&DR eastwards from Marsh Mills to Plympton, where the china clay could be brought down a pack horse road from Lee Moor. This opened in 1834. It is not clear whether the railway extension was Morley's property or the Johnsons', but it is generally regarded as being part of the P&DR.

=== Passengers ===
The P&DR was not planned, or authorised, as a passenger railway. However, Kendall reports an extract from a "chronicle in diary form compiled by one William Bray, sometime Rector of Tavistock"; approaching King's Tor he found that

Some huts, one a blacksmith's shop now presented themselves, and before this stood a vehicle not much unlike a rude kind of vis-a-vis with an awning. This I had observed passing on with some degree of rapidity before us. I conclude that in these carriages with iron wheels, though as cumbrous and uneasy as the scythed cars of the Britons, many pleasure parties make excursions from Plymouth, for a man accosted me and said that if I wanted to see the works, Mr. Johnson, or Thomson or some such name, would show them to me ...

This seems to be a non sequitur, and it may be that the carriage was simply a stone wagon equipped with boards as seats for the Engineer to view the works on the line.

== After opening day ==
The original estimate for completion of the line had been £27,783 on which a return of 18% had been foretold. Now that the line was open, £37,000 had been subscribed and £28,000 borrowed from the Exchequer; the Johnson Brothers had negotiated an advantageous rate for their traffic, and any receipts from it would return to them for moneys owing to them; and there seemed to be little general traffic. The dominance of Johnson Brothers traffic is shown by the return of receipts from 26 September 1823 to 5 July 1825:

- Johnson Brothers: £1093
- Cash (i.e. everyone else): £29.

Now however the Earl of Morley demanded that the commitment of 1821, to connect his Cann Wood Quarry to the line, should be honoured at once. With the Exchequer demanding payment of capital and interest on Exchequer loans, the company was now in serious trouble.

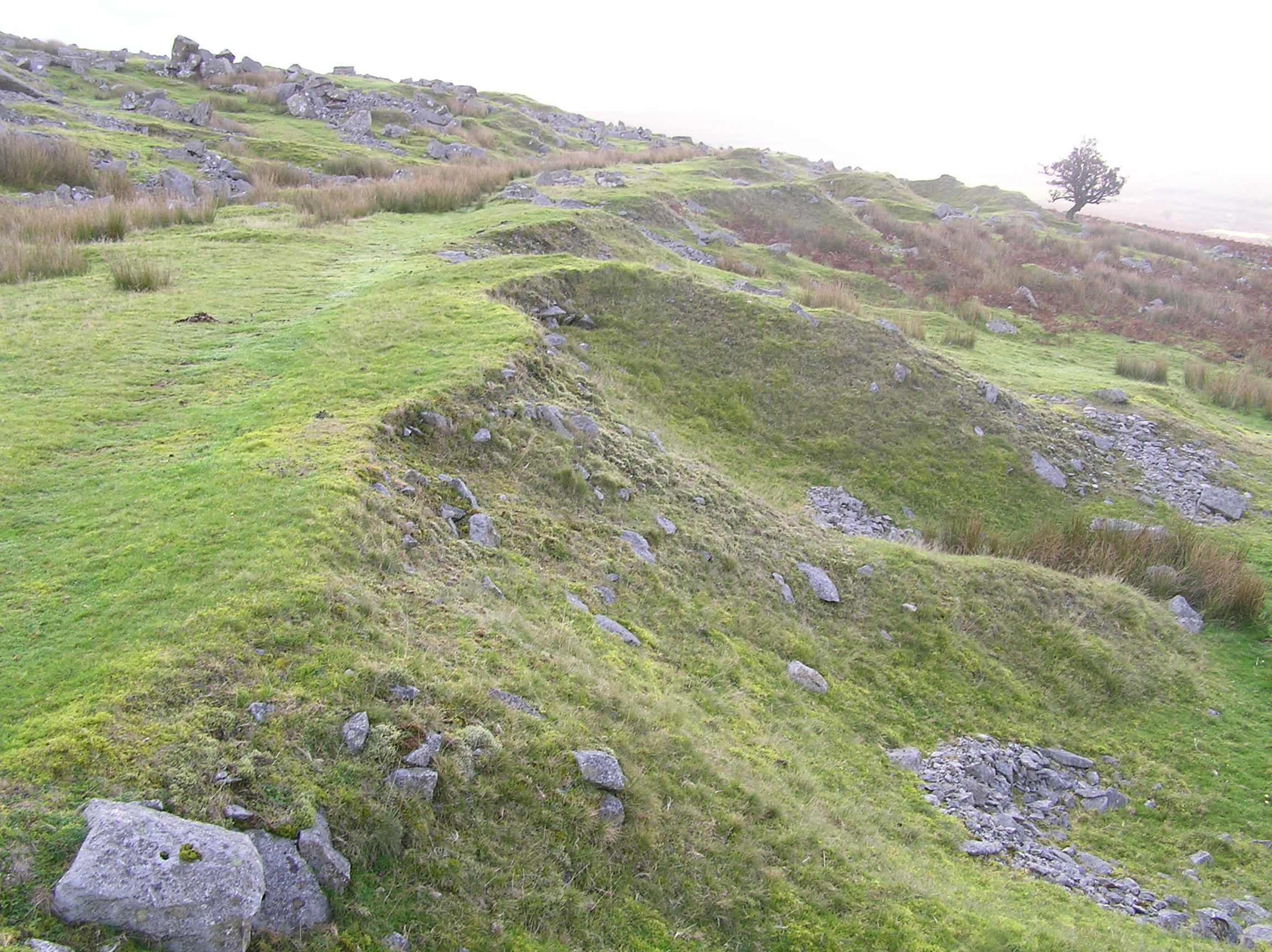
Internal incline at Swelltor

Nonetheless the Sutton Harbour "branch" (i.e. extension from Crabtree) was completed in December 1825 and the final section to Princetown in December 1826. The terminal of the line there was at the rear of the later Railway Inn; the railway "ran across the present street from the road which now leads to the Railway Station (which was formerly known as Frenchman's Row), up into a little garden in the rear of the Railway Inn, where it ended." (Note: The original Plymouth and Dartmoor Railway Act 1819 had stated that the northern terminus was to be at Bachelor's Hall, an agricultural store built by Tyrwhitt. The Hall is still in existence: it is about 1 km east of Princetown, but it is at a considerably lower altitude; in fact an incline on a gradient of 1 in 8 would probably have been required to reach it. It appears that this aspiration was quietly dropped. An 1850 map reproduced by Kingdom in The Princetown Branch indicates a mine at this location, and Harris refers to it as a small-scale tin mine.)

In desperation, the company agreed a reduction in tolls to the Johnson Brothers in return for an end date to their effective monopoly seven years later; this was agreed in the face of objection from the Exchequer. Lord Morley, seeing the reality of the situation, cut a canal from his quarry down to Marsh Mills, in exchange for low rates. This was actually simply a widening of an existing leat and proved unsatisfactory as a canal. However, a branch from the P&DR to Marsh Mills, crossing the River Plym. (Note: Kendall and others are ambiguous as to whether the company or Morley paid the construction cost.) The branch opened on 20 November 1829 or 20 January 1830

Lord Morley had interests in china clay (kaolinite) deposits on Lee Moor, and in 1833 he agreed with the Johnson Brothers that they would build a branch line to Plympton largely on the northern margin of the Exeter Turnpike. China clay was to be brought down from Lee Moor by packhorse to Plympton. The line was completed by mid 1834 and leased for 75 years to the Johnson Brothers.

The seven-year agreement with the Johnson Brothers had given them an effective monopoly of granite transport until 1834, but on expiry of that period no other trader came forward to challenge their established position.

Thomas Tyrwhitt died in 1833; his vision, to generate agricultural development on the moor, had failed. As early as 1825–6, this had been evident to von Oeynhausen and von Dechen, who had made a tour of English railways:

The railway was completed satisfactorily, but the plan for cultivation on Dartmoor has encountered such severe difficulties, that it seems that there is little to show for the effort. Consequently this expensive project has missed its main objective and can only service the interest on the capital outlay with difficulty, as it is limited to the transport of granite alone.

The huge overspend on the originally subscribed capital outlay had been partly funded by Exchequer loans of £28,000; the administrators periodically pressed the company for repayment, which the company could not afford. The line was effectively the private property of the Johnson Brothers and it appears likely that they made some payments on account to prevent premature seizure by the Exchequer.

Johnson Brothers' activity increased with the years; Rachel Evans, writing in 1846 passed the quarries:

An immense excavation presents itself studded with workmen ... some are boring holes in the flinty rock; others are filling the cavities with powder; some are chipping the rude blocks into shape; others are lifting their ponderous weight by cranes and levers; horses, carts and railway waggons, are in constant employment, to convey away the heavy masses of stone, (some twenty feet in length) which have been available in the principal public works, lately carried on in the metropolis: the Post Office and London Bridge, were constructed of this strong material, and at present it is furnished for building the new houses of parliament ... Three hundred men were recently in constant employment on the spot.

== General physical description ==
=== Main line ===
The P&DR railway was a horse-worked line with short cast iron rails on stone blocks, using a track gauge of 4 ft 6 in (1,372 mm), built with the intention of improving the moorland areas around Princetown. In fact granite quarries provided the dominant traffic. The main line descended from Princetown to Crabtree, east of Laira, following a very sinuous course in an attempt to limit the maximum gradient for the uphill haul; extremely small-radius curves were adopted in places to avoid major earthworks.

Priestley, writing in 1831 said

Commencing at Bachelor's Hall (Note: The line never reached this point.) in the parish of Lydford, at no great distance from the prison erected for the reception of prisoners of war on Dartmoor, the Plymouth and Dartmoor Railway runs in a very circuitous course from north to south by Moortown, Grenofen, Buckland Abbey, Hoo Meavy, and Borringdon to Crabtree in the parish of Egg Buckland, where it crosses the turnpike road from Plymouth to Exeter, and where the original line terminated; from thence, however, its course was continued, under powers granted by subsequent acts, to the sound at Sutton Pool, a short distance south of Plymouth.

From Princetown, where the terminal was intended for general merchandise servicing the small community there, the line ran west, passing between the Foggintor Quarry (to the north) and Swelltor Quarries (to the south, on the promontory formed by King's Tor); it swept round the north of King's Tor and to the west of Ingra Tor, now heading general south past Peekhill and across the western flank of Yennadon Down. South of Dousland there was a sharp turn to head north again, to maintain the contour, passing west to Yelverton where the line passed through the centre of the common. Close to the Roborough road, the line descended southwards curving past Clearbrook, and now with multiple twists the line descended to the west of the Tavistock Road through wooded terrain, before turning west through Leigham Tunnel. Negotiating more twist the line descended to the west of the River Plym to reach a point a little west of Marsh Mills. Here it turned west and followed close to the north bank of the Plym, eventually reaching Crabtree wharf.

On some similar lines a vehicle was provided for the horses to ride on the downhill journey but there is no evidence of this arrangement on the P&DR. The line was single-track and there were frequent passing sidings to enable opposing "trains" to pass one another.

The line was conceived as a toll line, where any carrier might use the line for his own wagons, but the overwhelming dominance of the Johnson Brothers' quarry traffic meant that the main line was effectively their private railway.

The intermediate land was moorland and agricultural upland but there were few significant settlements. Sidings, apparently for general merchandise, were provided at Yelverton and Roborough. Nearing Plymouth, the line ran to a wharf at Crabtree, and the later extension reached both Sutton Harbour and a wharf on the River Plym at Laira; at the time of construction the city had not been built up in those areas.

=== Branches ===
The extension to Marsh Mills was of similar construction, but in generally flatter terrain, and the further extension to Plympton ran on the north margin of the Exeter turnpike road. There was a two-span cast iron bridge at Marsh Mills. When the line was extended again to Cann Quarry, it was laid on the towpath of the erstwhile canal.

At the crossing of the South Devon Railway main line, boards were laid between the rails of the P&DR for the horses to walk on.

=== Permanent Way ===
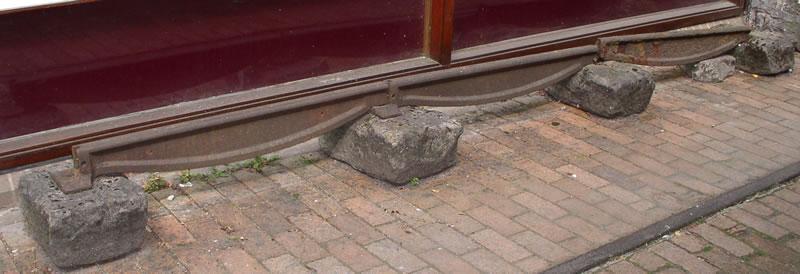
Fishbelly rail from the Cromford and High Peak Railway

The track gauge was 4 ft 6 in (1,370 mm); the rails were of the cast iron fishbelly pattern 3 to 4 feet (910 to 1,220 mm) in length. In contrast to later railways the rail spanned only a single space between stone sleeper blocks, being fastened in cast iron chairs. The "later" rails (after Hopkins' redesign) were 46.5 inches (1,180 mm) long with a 2.5 inches (64 mm) lap; the rail head was 1.75 inches (44 mm) wide with a web 3/4 inch (19 mm) thick; the depth of the rails was 4 inches (100 mm) at the sleeper block and 6 inches (150 mm) at mid span. In some places wooden sleepers were used, 5 feet long by 6 inches wide by 3 inches thick (1,524 by 152 by 76 mm). The earlier rails were butt ended and 36 inches (910 mm) long with a head width of only 1/2 inch (13 mm).

"These rails do not appear to be fastened so securely and durably as those with overlapping end laps." (Note: Die Befestigung dieser Schienen scheint nicht so sicher und dauerhaft, wie die mit übergreifenden Laschen. (Page 117.))

=== Wagons and operation ===
The main line had a generally falling gradient, and it was steep enough to require efficient braking. The wagon structure was founded on two main beams 9 feet (2.7 m) long, with the bed formed of 2 1/2 inches (64 mm) planking armoured with longitudinal iron strips. The wheels were cast iron, 29 inches (740 mm) diameter with 4 1/2 inches (110 mm) treads; the wheel treads were conical "so that the diameter close to the flange is 29¾ inches" (756 mm) . The axles were 41 1/2 inches (1,050 mm) apart. The brakes were cast iron and fixed to a long wooden lever, acting on both wheels on the same side. The couplings were connecting links 15 inches (380 mm) long.

There was a mobile crane, mounted on a wagon body; it was capable of lifting loads of 80 cwt (4 tonnes). It was in addition to the fixed cranes.

== South Devon Railway ==
=== Crossing at Laira Green ===
For some years the P&DR line was the only significant line in the area: but in 1843 the South Devon Railway (SDR) deposited plans for its proposed line from Exeter to Plymouth. When the bill was presented in the 1844 parliamentary session, it contained the statement that:

"Messrs John and William Johnson are in possession of and claim to be entitled as mortgagees or assignees to the said Plymouth and Dartmoor Railway ... "

This was the de facto position, and the P&DR proprietors were unable to have the clause containing the words removed. The section from Plympton to the junction near Marsh Mills was sold to the SDR and closed in 1847 to allow them to construct their main line without the necessity of making a crossing of the P&DR. Lord Morley seems to have acquiesced in this; his china clay traffic from Lee Moor used Plympton as a railhead and he may have considered the SDR a more efficient carrier from there to Plymouth.

The SDR obtained powers in the 1846 session to take over the P&DR line between Crabtree and Sutton Pool, but the terms were subject to negotiation, and this proved difficult and slow. At one stage the SDR attempted to install a crossing of the P&DR without agreement:

The progress of this extension was stopped by a dispute between the South Devon Railway Company and the mortgagee in possession of the Dartmoor Railway, a line 24 miles long, constructed in 1820. This railway was crossed on the level at right angles by the South Devon line. The mortgagee not getting the terms he asked from the South Devon Railway, brought immense blocks of granite from his Dartmoor quarries, and deposited them on the line where the South Devon wished to cross. This effectually prevented the railway from proceeding with the line and they soon arranged a compromise, which had the desired effect, the granite blocks being then removed by the mortgagee of the Dartmoor Railway.

This crossing became "the well-known oblique crossing at Laira", although the location was really Laira Green as opposed to Laira Wharf on the River Plym.

The South Devon Railway opened its line to Laira Green on 5 May 1848. The station was immediately on the Exeter side of the Laira crossing, (Note: From the map in Gregory, and the mileage of the station was 244m 40c; the later Laira signal box was at 244m 42c; see MacDermot vol II and Cooke.) at the turnpike bridge. The completion to Millbay took place on 2 April 1849.

=== Sutton Pool line sold ===
The South Devon Railway was anxious to get rail access to Sutton Pool, and on 23 April 1851 they finalised an agreement with the Johnson Brothers: it transferred ownership to the SDR; the SDR would lay mixed gauge track (broad gauge and 4 ft 6in) to maintain P&DR access to Sutton Pool while giving themselves access from Laira. The Cattewater section (the stub to the wharf on the Plym) was excluded from the arrangement. The triangular junction between the line to Sutton Pool and that to Cattewater had very short radius curves, but this area (referred to as "the Granite Works"), and wharves at Laira, were horse-operated for the first years. Some improvement to the curve was made, and the broad gauge rails opened in May 1853. The SDR obtained the South Devon Railway (Sutton Harbour Branch) Act 1854 (17 & 18 Vict. c. cxxii) on 3 July 1854 authorising the strengthening of the line for locomotive operation, and a deviation near the Granite Works to further ease the curve there.

=== Tavistock line ===
At the time of the South Devon Railway reaching Plymouth, promoters were already proposing a branch line to Tavistock, and after initial uncertainty it was the South Devon and Tavistock Railway (SD&TR) that seized the initiative. On 5 July 1852, the committee negotiated an agreement with Lord Morley, owner of the china clay extractive works on Lee Moor. The SD&TR agreed to build a branch line to Lee Moor for Morley; in doing so they would acquire the right to take over the P&DR Cann Quarry branch from Marsh Mills, which they needed to build their line. The Lee Moor line "would be at once constructed": presumably entirely on Morley's land no authorising Act was required, but the company was not yet incorporated.

Work started on building the Lee Moor branch in September 1852: it was to be an intrinsic part of the SD&TR lines, and possibly on the broad gauge. The SD&TR got its authorising act of Parliament, the South Devon and Tavistock Railway Act 1854 (17 & 18 Vict. c. clxxxix), on 24 July 1854. In August 1854 trial operations on the Lee Moor line were under way, but were suspended following an accident on 4 October 1854. An investigation revealed that the construction of the line was gravely inadequate.

William Phillips (as J & W Phillips) was the lessee of Morley's china clay deposits and had been relying on the completion of the line to get the mineral to Plymouth. After an investigation he undertook, it was plain that the works were unsatisfactory, and an agreement of 5 June 1856 the SD&TR relinquished its interest in the line, and Phillips took over.

The SD&TR opened its line to Tavistock on 21 June 1859, but without taking over any of the P&DR line.

=== Sutton Pool improvements ===
The SDR closed the Laira to Sutton Pool line in 1856 so that it could be rebuilt for locomotive working, implementing the authorisation of 3 July 1854. When it reopened in 1857 the 4 ft 6in gauge and broad gauge lines had been separated between Laira, Prince Rock and Cattewater. In 1869 the obligation on the South Devon Railway (by agreement with Phillips) to maintain the 4 ft 6in gauge access to Sutton Pool lapsed, and on 19 April they introduced locomotive operation, having removed the Dartmoor gauge rails.

== Lee Moor Tramway: construction ==
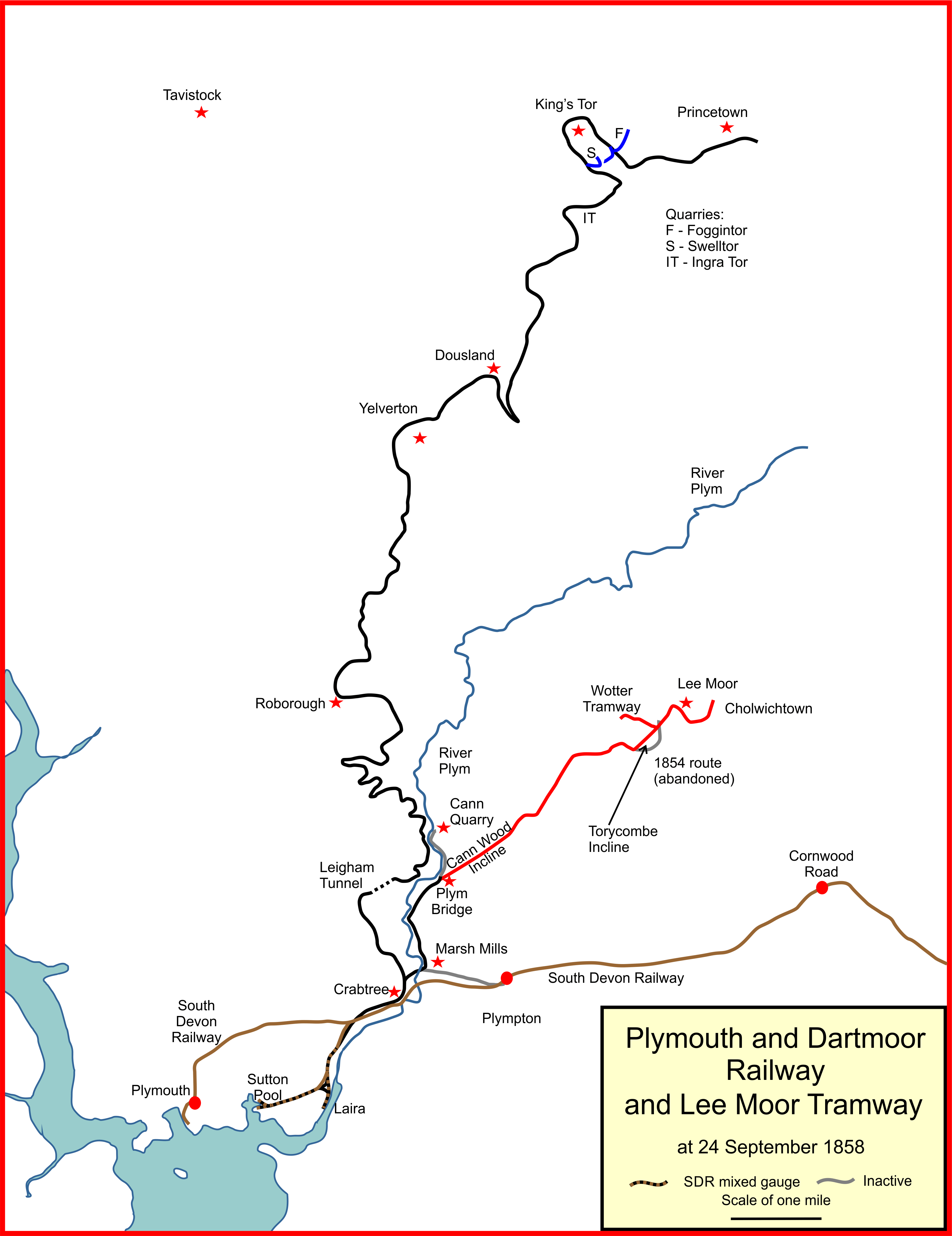
Map of the P&DR and Lee Moor Tramway

The heavy mineral commodity being extracted by William Phillips, lessee of Lord Morley was situated on Lee Moor at an altitude of 900 feet (270 m). After the failed attempt of the SD&TR to build a branch line to Lee Moor, Phillips took over the line on 20 December 1855, determined to construct the line himself. This was to become the Lee Moor Tramway, from Lee Moor to join the P&DR line near Plym Bridge (on the Cann Quarry branch, not the P&DR main line), a distance of 4.2 kilometres (2.6 miles) including a spur line to Wotter village. His line was built to the same track gauge as the P&DR. There was much to do, involving a completely new alignment at the Torycombe incline and total or partial reconstruction of several bridges. Phillips finally opened the line on 24 September 1858.

There were two inclines, called Cann Wood and Torycombe; they were of the counterbalanced self-acting type. There was a passing loop in the middle of each; above the loop there was a three-rail section, with the middle rail common; below the loop there was a single track. When the ascending and descending cuts crossed at the loop, the descending cut pushed through the points at the lower end of the loop, and they were therefore correctly set for the next ascending cut.

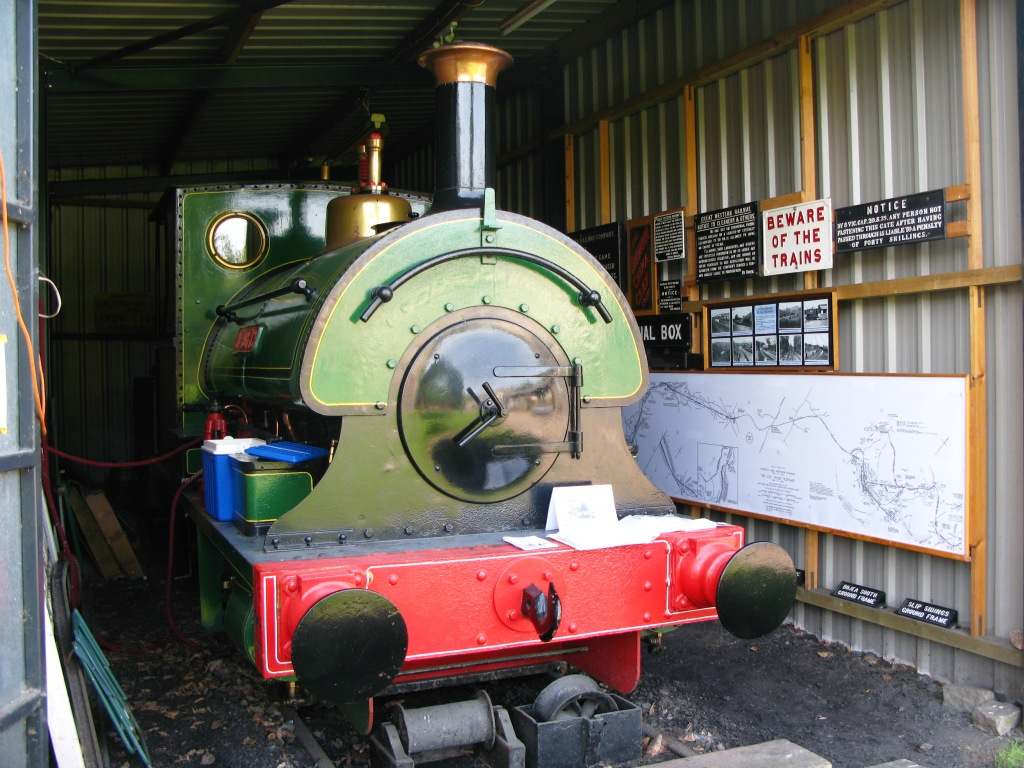
Lee Moor No. 2, one of only two steam locomotives to work on the Lee Moor line. It is preserved at Buckfastleigh, along with the one surviving wagon.

Cann Wood incline was 6,600 feet (2,000 m) long on a gradient on 1 in 11; Torycombe was 2,145 feet (654 m) long on a gradient of 1 in 7.

The line ran through Lee Moor village to Cholwichtown, and a spur line to Wotter Village (the Wotter Tramway). The original alignment and incline approaching Lee Moor was closed, but part of it was used as a dead-end approach to kilns.

== The P&DR from 1865 ==
Plymouth and Dartmoor Railway Act 1865
- Act of Parliament
- Parliament of the United Kingdom
- Long title: An Act to repeal the Acts relating to the Plymouth and Dartmoor Railway Company; to authorize the raising of additional Capital, and Arrangements with the South Devon Railway Company; and for other Purposes.
- Citation: 28 & 29 Vict. c. cxxxi

Dates
- Royal assent: 19 June 1865

Text of statute as originally enacted

An agreement was made on 3 May 1865 to reconstitute the Plymouth and Dartmoor Railway Company, with all the preference shares owned by William Johnson. This was confirmed by the Plymouth and Dartmoor Railway Act 1865 (28 & 29 Vict. c. cxxxi). The new company was sufficiently profitable to be able to pay a 0.25% dividend in 1870.

Relaying on the P&DR main line proceeded: 600 tons of new rail were laid in 1873–4.

=== Princetown Railway ===
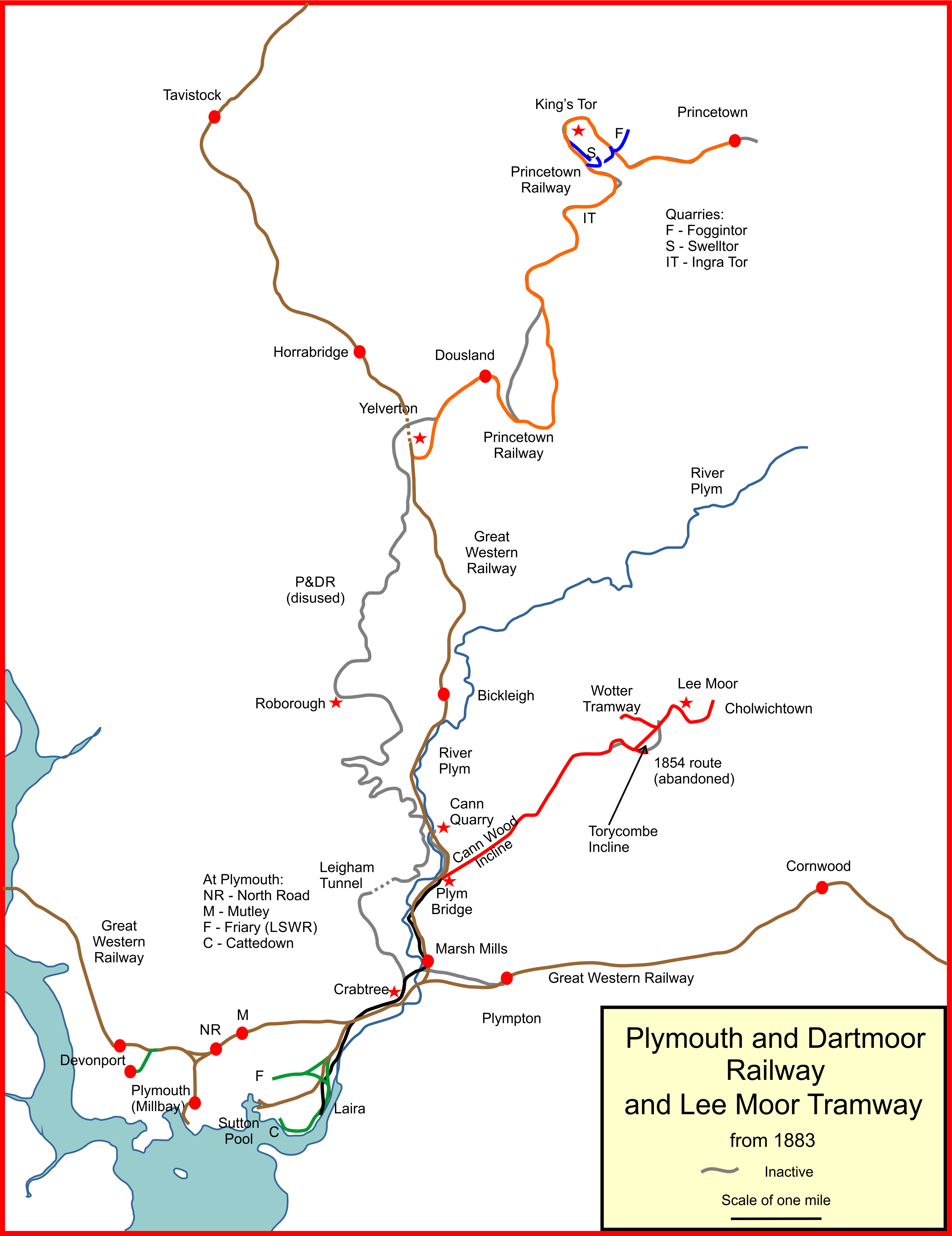
Map of P&DR after opening of the Princetown Railway

However in November 1877 plans were deposited for the Princetown Railway: a standard gauge branch line from a junction on the Tavistock line at Yelverton. Near Princetown this would serve the town and the quarries on the P&DR line, which it was to replace. Some minor alignment improvements were made to accommodate locomotive working, and a major section of new route to pass east of Yennadon Down and to descend to the Tavistock line at Yelverton.

The transfer took place in 1878: the Princetown Railway paid £22,000 in shares for the necessary part of the line, and it opened on 11 August 1883. The activities of the Plymouth and Dartmoor Railway were now confined to the Lee Moor traffic from the point where that line joined; in Plymouth there were interchange arrangements with the Great Western Railway (GWR) at Laira, and a wharf on the Plym, also at Laira.

=== Turnchapel branch ===
Plymouth and Dartmoor Railway (Plymouth Extensions) Act 1875
- Act of Parliament
- Parliament of the United Kingdom
- Long title: An Act for conferring further powers on the Plymouth and Dartmoor Railway Company for the construction of Works and the raising of Moneys, and otherwise in relation to their Undertaking, and for authorising Agreements between them and other Railway Companies; and for other purposes.
- Citation: 38 & 39 Vict. c. cliv

Dates
- Royal assent: 19 July 1875

In the 1870s the GWR and the LSWR were competing for possession of territory around Plymouth, especially in the South Hams, the area east of the Plym. The Plymouth and Dartmoor Railway worked as an ally of the LSWR in promoting a branch lines locally, and they obtained powers in the Plymouth and Dartmoor Railway (Plymouth Extensions) Act 1875 (38 & 39 Vict. c. cliv) to construct short branches from the P&DR line at Cattewater. The LSWR took over these powers in 1882 and the branches were from the LSWR Friary line.

Plymouth and Dartmoor Railway Act 1883
- Act of Parliament
- Parliament of the United Kingdom
- Long title: An Act for conferring further powers on the Plymouth and Dartmoor Railway Company for the construction of Works the raising of Money and otherwise in relation to their Undertaking and for providing for the distribution of the proceeds of the sale of a portion of the Undertaking of the Company and for other purposes.
- Citation: 46 & 47 Vict. c. cxxxix

Dates
- Royal assent: 2 August 1883

Plymouth and Dartmoor Railway (South Hams Extension) Act 1888
- Act of Parliament
- Parliament of the United Kingdom
- Long title: An Act for conferring further Powers on the Plymouth and Dartmoor Railway Company for the construction of a new railway to Modbury and otherwise in relation to their Undertaking; and for other purposes.
- Citation: 51 & 52 Vict. c. liii

Dates
- Royal assent: 28 June 1888

Text of statute as originally enacted

Plymouth and Dartmoor Railway Act 1891
- Act of Parliament
- Parliament of the United Kingdom
- Long title: An Act to confer further powers upon the Plymouth and Dartmoor Railway Company.
- Citation: 54 & 55 Vict. c. lxxiii

Dates
- Royal assent: 3 July 1891

Text of statute as originally enacted

Plymouth and Dartmoor Railway Act 1894
- Act of Parliament
- Parliament of the United Kingdom
- Long title: An Act to revive the Powers and Extend the Time for the Compulsory Purchase of Land and Completion of Works authorised by the Plymouth and Dartmoor Railway Act 1883 the Plymouth and Dartmoor Railway (South Hams Extension) Act 1888 and the Plymouth and Dartmoor Railway Act 1891 and for other purposes.
- Citation: 57 & 58 Vict. c. clxxxviii

Dates
- Royal assent: 17 August 1894

Text of statute as originally enacted

On 2 August 1883 the P&DR obtained powers in the Plymouth and Dartmoor Railway Act 1883 (46 & 47 Vict. c. cxxxix) to build a line to Turnchapel; it succeeded in building a bridge over the Plym near Laira road bridge, opened as far as Plymstock (then called Pomphlett) in 1887. The LSWR took over the powers for the branch, and they opened it on 1 January 1897.

=== Final years of the P&DR ===
Towards the end of the nineteenth century the P&DR had lost the quarry traffic from Dartmoor (to the Princetown Railway) and practically all the general merchandise traffic. The Lee Moor line flourished as the trade in the mineral flourished, and the china clay work therefore dominated the residue of the company. In 1916 the rails on the disused section above Cann Wood were recovered for scrap, and under the Railways Act 1921 the company was transferred to the new Southern Railway. In practice this referred to the short branches around the Cattewater. The Lee Moor Tramway continued in use, traversing the southern end of the P&DR main line, and the entire section of route from Lee Moor to Laira became colloquially known as the Lee Moor Tramway.

== Lee Moor Tramway in operation ==
In 1862 Phillips, having managed all the difficulty of creating the Lee Moor line, sold his china clay business and the lease of the line to Mrs R. Martin.

The dominant traffic was china clay downhill to the Cattewater or Laira exchange sidings and stores and coal uphill to Lee Moor. The inclines operated by balancing loaded wagons with empties; at Cann incline five loaded wagons downhill would pull three empties and two loaded wagons up. At Torycombe water tank wagons were kept ready when an unbalanced uphill movement was required.

Increasing volumes of traffic caused to locomotives to be acquired in 1899; they worked the section between the inclines, horses continuing to haul the wagons above and below. Heavier rails were installed ready for locomotive operation.

At Lee Moor there had been short branches to Wotter and Cholwich Town but these closed in 1900 and 1910 respectively.

In 1919 the china clay operation and the tramway were sold to English China Clays Limited (ECC), and this company became part of English Clays, Lovering Pochin Ltd (ECLP). From 1936 the section above Torycombe incline ceased to be used, and the operating company increasingly installed pipelines to transmit the china clay in slurry form, and also by road.

The last commercial use of the tramway seems to have been at the end of 1945 and commissioning of a major pipeline from Lee Moor to Marsh Mills in 1947 made the closure irrevocable. The owning company did not wish to relinquish the right of way, however, and token movements carrying sand from Marsh Mills to Maddock's concrete works were made at three-monthly intervals. This continued until the final movement on 26 August 1960, the last time the Lee Moor Tramway horses pulled wagons across the Great Western Railway main line. The trackwork in the main line was removed in October–November.

== Omen Beam Tramway ==
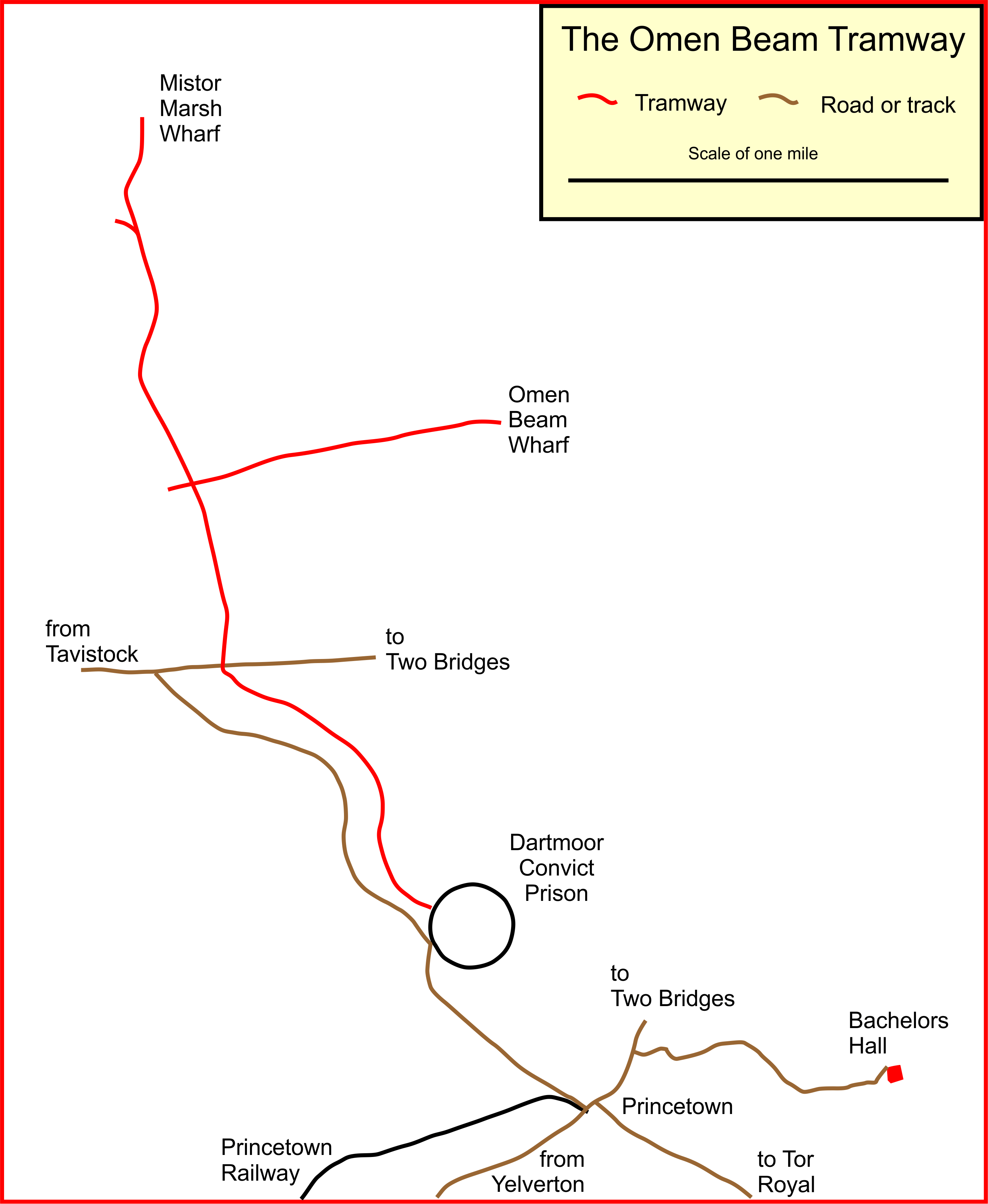
Map of the Omen Beam Tramway

In 1844 two Plymouth businessmen, Jacob Hall-Drew and Peter Adams, attempted to generate a business in processing peat to make naphtha. They rented Tyrwhitt's mill at Bachelor's Hall, east of Princetown, and in 1846 moved to Dartmoor Prison, which was not otherwise in use. They formed the British Patent Naphtha Company and built a tramroad to Yearlick Ball, north of the prison, to bring the peat down from that point to a works at the prison building; they also built a branch to Omen Beam near Fice's Well. The track gauge was probably 4 ft 6in, and horse traction was used.

The peat was processed to produce naphtha, used for making candles and mothballs, and the fibrous material in the peat was used in paper making. Over 30 tons of peat were used daily.

The track rails were spiked direct to wooden sleepers, not stone setts, and fine ballast was laid between the rails for the horses' walkway. The total cost (probably including the works) was £19,000. The total length was 2 3/4 miles (4.4 km).

When the prison was reopened as a convict prison, the entire building was at first lit using naphtha gas, and in the twentieth century a gas engine ran on the fuel.

The track may easily be seen from the Two Bridges Road east of Rundlestone Corner.

A present-day description and photographs are available on Richard Knight's Dartmoor Walks website at and a description of the process of peat processing, and references to the Omen Beam activity are on the Legendary Dartmoor website at

== See also ==
- Railways in Plymouth
