= List of rail trails =

Former railway lines now converted to shared-use paths

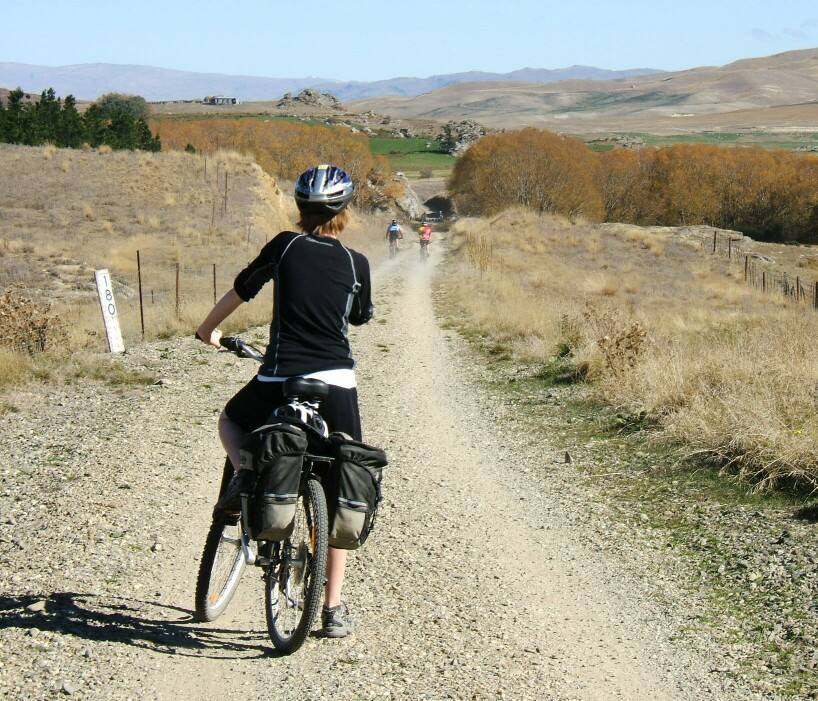
Cyclists on the Otago Central Rail Trail, in Otago, New Zealand

Rail trails are former railway lines that have been converted to paths designed for pedestrian, bicycle, equestrian and/or light motorised traffic. Most are shared-use paths, offering at least pedestrians and cyclists recreational access and right-of-way to the routes.

Rail trails around the world longer than 0.1 miles (161 m) include the following:

== Asia ==
=== Burma ===
- Parts of Burma Railway.

=== Israel ===
- The Jerusalem Railway Park.

=== Japan ===
- Kōchi Aki Bicycle Path 高知安芸自転車道 on the former "Tosa Electric Railway Aki Line".
- Maple Yaba Cycling Road メイプル耶馬サイクリングロード from Nakatsu to the Morizane Hot Springs in Yamakuni.

=== Malaysia/Singapore ===
- Parts of Johor Bahru-Tanjong Pagar KTM railway, known as the Green Corridor.

=== South Korea ===
- Section of the historic Jungang line between Paldang and Yangpyeong.

=== Taiwan ===
- DongFeng Bicycle Green Way 東豐自行車綠廊 and HuoFeng Bike Path 后豐鐵馬道 in Taichung City, connects the towns of FengYuan, HouLi and DongShi
- Tanya Shen Green Bikeway 潭雅神綠園道 from TanZi to DaYa, Taichung City
- Taolin Bikeway 桃林鐵路自行車道 on the Linkou Line, 1968 build for the coal transport from Taoyuan to the Linkou Power Plant.

== Europe ==
=== Austria ===
A more complete reference can be found at www.bahntrassenradeln.de.

- Dampfross und Drahtesel on the former de:Stammersdorfer Lokalbahn
- de:Traisentalradweg on the former de:Leobersdorfer Bahn
- Reichraminger Hintergebirgs on former de:Waldbahn Reichraming
- Part of de:Steyrtalradweg follows the former de:Steyrtalbahn
- Salzkammergut-Lokalbahn-Radweg on the former de:Salzkammergut-Lokalbahn between Strobl and St. Gilgen
- de:Salzkammergut-Radweg on the former de:Ischlerbahn and de:Salzkammergut-Lokalbahn from Salzburg to Bad Ischl
- de:Feistritztal-Radweg: the first 18 km (11 mi) between Ratten and de:Birkfeld on a dismantled part of the de:Feistritztalbahn.

=== Belgium ===
- Line 29 from Aarschot to Herentals
- Line 29 north of Turnhout towards the Dutch border
- Line 38 from Liège to Hombourg (Ravel 5)
- Line 62 from Ostend to Torhout
- Line 108 from Binche to Erquelinnes
- Parts of line 109 from Chimay to Froidchapelle, from Faurœulx to Estinnes, and from Faurœulx to Thuin
- Line 142 from Namur to Hoegaarden (Ravel 2)
- Most of Line 160 from Brussels to Tervuren
- Part of line 163A from Sainte-Cécile to Muno.

=== Croatia ===
- Parenzana from Koper to Poreč.

=== Czechia ===
- Line 14a from Horní Žďár to Jáchymov
- Line 144 from Loket to Horní Slavkov
- Line 257 from Kyjov to Mutěnice
- Line 302 from Nezamyslice to Morkovice-Slížany
- Line 326 from Hostašovice to Nový Jičín
- Line 703 from Cheb to Hundsbach.

=== Denmark ===
- Fodsporet: 40 km (25 mi) between Slagelse and Næstved, via Dalmose, plus 12 km (7 mi) between Dalmose and Skælskør in the south-eastern part of Sjælland; opened 2011
- Himmerlandsstien: 70 km (43 mi) between Viborg and Løgstør, in the northern part of Jutland; opened 2007 (Danish: da:Himmerlandsstien)
- Naturstien Horsens-Silkeborg: Naturetrail, 60 km (37 mi) between Horsens and Silkeborg, in the middle of Jutland.

=== Finland ===
- Baana, a 1.5 km (0.9 mi) section of the former Helsinki harbour railway line.

=== France ===
France had rail trails with a total length of 7,044 km (4,377 mi) as at November 2025. More projects are being planned or under construction; these are some already in place:

- Avenue Verte between St-Aubin-le-Cauf (near Dieppe) and Forges-les-Eaux
- Promenade plantée (walk with trees) 4.5 km (2.8 mi) in the 12th arrondissement of Paris; built on the former railway line between Bastille and the eastern suburbs of Paris (1859-1969)
- Coulée verte (green belt) 29 km (18 mi), on the former railway lines from Amiens and Beauvais, 43 km (27 mi) was opened for the traffic between 1874 and 1972 or 1990
- Coulée verte 1 km (0.6 mi), on the former transversal line (closed in 1979) between the station of Colombes and the station of Les Vallées la Garenne-Colombes
- Roger Lapébie path runs for 57 km (35 mi) from Bordeaux, through Créon and onto Sauveterre-de-Guyenne
- Voie verte (green way) in the Vosges, linking Remiremont to Bussang, and Remiremont to Cornimont
- Voie verte from Givry to Mâcon
- Voie verte from Mios to Bazas, 76 km (47 mi) in the Aquitaine.

=== Germany ===
There were 613 rail trails with a total length of 4,400 km (2,734 mi) in September 2013; eighty more projects are being planned or under construction. These are some of the longest rail trails:

- Bahnradweg Hessen with a total length of 250 km (155 mi) following old tracks of the Vogelsbergbahn, Vogelsberger Südbahn, Biebertalbahn and Ulstertalbahn.
- Bockl-Radweg in Bavaria with a total length of 45 km (28 mi) on the old track, from Neustadt a.d. Waldnaab to Eslarn
- Freital East–Possendorf railway line was a standard-gauge branch line near Dresden, in Saxony
- Maare-Mosel-Radweg with 39 km (24 mi) on the old trackbed
- Nordbahntrasse trail crosses the city of Wuppertal 23 km (14 mi)
- Ruwer-Hochwald-Radweg, with 44 km (27 mi) on the former trackbed
- Schinderhannes-Radweg, with 36 km (22 mi) on the former trackbed of the Hunsrück Railway
- Vennbahn trail is a cross-border trail between Germany, Belgium and Luxembourg, which follows the route of the former Vennbahn railway line for approximately 130 km (81 mi) from the city of Aachen through the High Fens – Eifel Nature Park and the Ardennes to Troisvierges.

=== Hungary ===
- Part of line 11 from Szentkirályszabadja to Balatonalmádi
- Line 25 from Bagod to Zalalövő
- Part of line 49 from Tamási to Pári
- Part of line 63 from Pécs to Pellérd
- Part of line 65 from Harkány to Drávaszabolcs
- Part of the former narrow gauge line from Sátoraljaújhely to Pálháza
- Part of the former line from Bárdudvarnok to Lipótfa.

=== Ireland ===
- Connemara Greenway: 76 km (47 mi) between Galway and Clifden, in County Galway
- Great Southern Trail: West Limerick/North Kerry; the 85 km (53 mi) route was taken by the Limerick-Tralee railway line
- Great Western Greenway: between Westport and Achill, County Mayo (42 km (26 mi))
- Old Rail Trail: Athlone to Mullingar Cycleway, County Westmeath (42 km (26 mi))
- Tralee-Fenit Greenway: the former North Kerry railway, County Kerry (14 km (9 mi))
- Waterford Greenway: the Deise Greenway, on 46 km (29 mi) of the former Dungarvan to Waterford railway, County Waterford.

=== Italy ===
- Syracuse - Ragusa Railway, part in Val dell' Anapo
- Trieste - Kozina (Slovenia) Railway, passing through Val Rosandra.

=== Luxembourg ===
- Prince Henri railway in Clemency.

=== Norway ===
- Skreia Line.

=== Poland ===
- Stary Kolejowy Szlak
- Żelazny Szlak Rowerowy
- Ścieżka rowerowa na trasie linii kolejowej Swarzewo – Krokowa.

=== Portugal ===
- Ecopista do Rio Minho
- Ecovia do Rio Lima
- Ecopista do Tâmega
- Ecopista do Dão.

=== Slovenia ===
- Jesenice to Tarvisio, Italy: c. 35 miles (56 km)
- Kozina - Trieste, Italy. (Note: See Italy subsection.)

=== Spain ===
- Senda del oso, Asturias
- Vía Verde de la Sierra (mountain's rail track), Cádiz and Seville
- Vía Verde de la Sierra de la Demanda, Burgos
- Vía Verde de Ojos Negros, Valencia and Teruel
- Girona - narrow gauge railway route 1: this 57 km (35 mi) route crosses three regions and twelve towns, following the valleys of the Fluvià, Brugent and Ter rivers. The trail descends smoothly from Olot (440 m (1,444 ft)) to Girona (70 m (230 ft))
- Girona - narrow gauge railway route 2: The trail is 40 kilometres (25 mi) long. With a smooth incline from Girona to Sant Feliu de Guíxols (15 m (49 ft)), its highest point is at Cassà de la Selva (136 m (446 ft)). From Girona to Sant Feliu, it passes through the Gironès and the Baix Empordà; from the Ter River basin, it crosses the Selva depression and ends in the Ridaura valley.

=== Sweden ===
- Banvallsleden (c. 150 km (93 mi))
- Sjuhäradsrundan Borås to Ulricehamn (45 km (28 mi))
- Ätradalsleden Falköping to Ambjörnarp (93 km (58 mi)).

=== United Kingdom ===
==== England ====
- Addiscombe Railway Park: Addiscombe to Woodside, in Croydon, south London (0.6 mi (1.0 km))
- Alban Way: St Albans Abbey to Hatfield, Hertfordshire (6.3 mi (10.1 km))
- Angel Walk: Meridian Water to Edmonton Green, north London (0.2 mi (0.3 km))
- Apethorne Junction to Godley Junction: Hyde, Greater Manchester (3 mi (4.8 km))
- Ashchurch-Tewkesbury: Ashchurch to Tewkesbury: Gloucestershire (1 mi (1.6 km))
- Auckland Way: Spennymoor to Bishop Auckland, County Durham (4.3 mi (6.9 km))
- Ayot Greenway: Welwyn Garden City to Wheathampstead, Hertfordshire (3 mi (4.8 km))
- Beckton Corridor: Beckton DLR station to Connaught Bridge, east London (0.5 mi (0.8 km))
- Belmont Trail: Stanmore Village to Harrow, north-west London (2.2 mi (3.5 km))
- Bembridge to Brading: Isle of Wight (4 mi (6.4 km))
- Bermondsey (Stubbs Drive to Surrey Canal Road): south London (0.5 mi (0.8 km))
- Biddulph Valley Way: Ford Green & Smallthorne, Cheshire, to Mossley, Staffordshire (6.5 mi (10.5 km))
- Bingham Linear Walk: Nottinghamshire (2 mi (3.2 km))
- Blackwater Rail Trail: Witham to Maldon East, Essex (8 mi (12.9 km))
- Bowes Railway Path: Jarrow to Tanfield Railway Museum, Tyne and Wear (11.5 mi (19 km))
- Bradley Fold Cycleway: Bolton to Bury, Greater Manchester
- Brampton Valley Way: Northampton to Market Harborough, Northamptonshire (14 mi (23 km))
- Brandon to Bishop Auckland: Broompark to Bishop Auckland, County Durham (9 mi (14.5 km))
- Bridport to West Bay: Dorset (1 mi (1.6 km))
- Bristol and Bath Railway Path: Bristol to Bath, Somerset (15 mi (24 km))
- Bubwith Rail Trail: Bubwith to Market Weighton, East Riding of Yorkshire (8 mi (12.9 km))
- Buckingham Railway Walk: Buckinghamshire (1 mi (1.6 km))
- Bungay: Suffolk (1 mi (1.6 km))
- Bure Valley Path: Wroxham to Aylsham, Norfolk (9 mi (14.5 km))
- Camel Trail: Padstow to Wenford Bridge, Cornwall (17.3 mi (28 km))
- Castle Eden Walkway: Castle Eden to Thorpe Thewles, County Durham (9 mi (14.5 km))
- Castleman Trailway: Ringwood to Upton Country Park, Hampshire (16 mi (26 km))
- Centurion Way: Chichester to Singleton, West Sussex (7 mi (11.3 km))
- Chedworth Nature Reserve: Chedworth to Withington, Gloucestershire (1 mi (1.6 km))
- Chippenham to Calne Railway Path: Chippenham to Calne, Wiltshire (6 mi (9.7 km))
- Chiseldon to Marlborough Railway Path: Wiltshire (7.3 mi (11.7 km))
- Cinder Track: Scarborough to Whitby, North Yorkshire (21 mi (34 km))
- Cloud Trail: Worthington, Leicestershire, to Chellaston, Derbyshire (part of National Cycle Route no. 6)
- Clowne Greenway: Clowne to Cresswell, Derbyshire.(7km)
- Cole Green Way: Welwyn Garden City to Hertford, Hertfordshire (6 mi (9.7 km))
- Consett and Sunderland Railway Path: County Durham (24 mi (39 km))
- Cotgrave Country Park: Nottinghamshire (2 mi (3.2 km))
- Cotmanhay Linear Park: Derbyshire (0.4 mi (0.6 km))
- Crab and Winkle Way: uses part of Canterbury and Whitstable Railway, Kent (8 mi (12.9 km))
- Cuckoo Trail: Hampden Park to Heathfield, East Sussex (14 mi (23 km))
- Deerness Valley Way: Broompark to Crook, County Durham
- Delph Donkey Trail: Delph to Moorgate, Greater Manchester (2 mi (3.2 km))
- Derwent Walk: Consett to Swalwell, County Durham (12 mi (19 km))
- Dousland to Princetown Railway Track: Devon (8 mi (12.9 km))
- Downs Link: Guildford to Christ's Hospital, Steyning and Shoreham-by-Sea, Surrey/West Sussex (36.7 mi (59 km))
- Drakes Trail: Plymouth Millbay to Tavistock South, Devon (21 mi (34 km))
- Dyke Railway Trail: Hangleton to Brighton & Hove Golf Club, East Sussex (1.25 mi (2.0 km))
- Ebury Way: Rickmansworth to near Watford High Street, Hertfordshire (3.5 mi (5.6 km))
- Eling Way: Hermitage to Hampstead Norreys, Berkshire (2 mi (3.2 km))
- Exmouth to Budleigh Salterton, Devon (4 mi (6.4 km))
- Fallowfield Loop: Fairfield to St Werburgh's Road, Greater Manchester (6.5 mi (10.5 km))
- Five Pits Trail: Grassmoor to Tibshelf Town, Derbyshire (5.5 mi (8.9 km))
- Flitch Way: Bishops Stortford, Hertfordshire to Braintree, Essex (15 mi (24 km))
- Forest Way: East Grinstead to Groombridge, East/West Sussex (10 mi (16 km))
- Freshwater to Yarmouth: Isle of Wight
- Garstang and Knot-End Railway: The Fylde, Lancashire (1 mi (1.6 km))
- Goathland to Grosmont, along the original Whitby and Pickering Railway alignment
- Gorleston-on-Sea, Norfolk (0.5 mi (0.8 km))
- Gosport to Stokes Bay: Hampshire (0.7 mi (1.1 km))
- Gosport to Fareham, Hampshire (2 mi (3.2 km))
- Granite Way: Okehampton to Lydford, Devon (11 mi (17.7 km))
- Great Central Walk: Rugby Central to Brownsover, Warwickshire (4.5 mi (7.2 km))
- Great Central Way: Braunstone Gate to Glenhills, Leicestershire (3.5 mi (5.6 km))
- Great Eastern Linear Park: Lowestoft North, Suffolk (1.1 mi (1.8 km))
- Great Northern Railway Trail: Cullingworth to Queensbury, West Yorkshire
- Hadleigh Railway Walk: Hadleigh to Raydon Wood, Suffolk (2 mi (3.2 km))
- Hamble Rail Trail: Hamble to Southampton Water, Hampshire (4.5 mi (7.2 km))
- Harborne Walkway: Harborne to Icknield Port Road, Birmingham, West Midlands (2.4 mi (3.9 km))
- Hart to Haswell Walkway: Monk Hesleden to Hart, County Durham
- Haverhill, Suffolk (1.5 mi (2.4 km))
- Hawthorn to Ryhope Way: Seaton to South Hetton, County Durham
- Hayling Billy Trail: Havant to South Hayling, Hampshire (5 mi (8.0 km))
- High Peak Trail: Hurdlow to Cromford, Derbyshire (17 mi (27 km))
- Hincaster Trailway: Hincaster to Arnside, Cumbria
- Honeybourne Line Walk: Cheltenham Spa to just short of Cheltenham Racecourse, Gloucestershire (2.1 mi (3.4 km))
- Hornsea Rail Trail: Hull to Hornsea, East Riding of Yorkshire (26 mi (41.8 km))
- Hudson Way: Market Weighton to Beverley, East Riding of Yorkshire (10 mi (16.1 km))
- Hull to Winestead Rail Trail: East Riding of Yorkshire (20 mi (32.2 km))
- Hurworth Burn to Station Town, Wingate path: County Durham (1.8 mi (2.9 km))
- Isabel Trail: Stafford, Staffordshire (1.7 mi (2.7 km))
- Kelloe Way: Kelloe, County Durham (1.3 mi (2.1 km))
- Kenilworth Greenway Linear Park: Kenilworth, Warwickshire (4 mi (6.4 km))
- Keswick Railway Path: Keswick to Threlkeld, Cumbria (3.5 mi (5.6 km))
- Killamarsh Central to Renishaw; part of the Trans Pennine Trail, Derbyshire
- Kirklees Trail: Bury Bolton Street to Greenmount, Greater Manchester
- Lakenham Way: Norwich, Norfolk (1.4 mi (2.3 km))
- Lancaster to Caton, Lancashire (6 mi (9.7 km))
- Lancaster to Morecambe, Lancashire
- Lanchester Valley Railway path: Durham to Consett, County Durham (12 mi (19.3 km))
- Lavenham to Long Melford, Suffolk (4.5 mi (7.2 km))
- Ledbury Town Trail: Ledbury, Herefordshire (1.6 mi (2.6 km))
- Leicester West Bridge to Ratby: Leicestershire
- Lines Way: Garforth to Allerton Bywater, West Yorkshire (4 mi (6.4 km))
- Liss to Liss Forest Road: Hampshire (1 mi (1.6 km))
- Longdendale Trail: Hadfield to Woodhead, Derbyshire (6.5 mi (10.5 km)); forms part of the Trans Pennine Trail
- Lune Estuary Path: Lancaster to Glasson Dock, Lancashire
- Manifold Way: Hulme End to Waterhouses, Staffordshire (8 mi (12.9 km))
- Marriott's Way: Norwich City to Aylsham South, Norfolk (25 mi (40.2 km))
- Meon Valley Railway Line: West Meon to Knowle Junction, Hampshire (11 mi (18 km))
- Mercian Way: Ironbridge to near Bridgnorth, Shropshire
- Merton Park Green Walks: Merton Park to South Wimbledon, London (0.1 mi (0.2 km))
- Meltham Greenway: Meltham, West Yorkshire (0.8 mi (1.3 km))
- Middlewood Way: Macclesfield, Cheshire, to Rose Hill Marple, Greater Manchester (10 mi (16 km))
- Millennium Greenway: Mickle Trafford, Cheshire, to Connah's Quay, Flintshire, Wales (10 mi (16 km))
- Milton Keynes redway system: former Wolverton–Newport Pagnell line, Buckinghamshire
- Mineral Tramway Trails: mid-west Cornwall
- Monsal Trail: Topley Pike junction to Coombs Viaduct near Bakewell, Derbyshire (7.1 mi (11.5 km))
- Newark Northgate to Bottesford: Nottinghamshire/Leicestershire (4.8 mi (7.7 km))
- Newham Trail: Highertown to Newham, Truro, Cornwall (1.6 mi (2.6 km))
- Newport to Wootton, Isle of Wight
- Nickey line: Harpenden to Hemel Hempstead, Hertfordshire (8.6 mi (13.8 km))
- Nidderdale Greenway: Harrogate to Ripley, North Yorkshire (4 mi (6.4 km)):
- North Dorset Trailway: Spetisbury to Sturminster Newton, Dorset (14 mi (22.5 km))
- North Liverpool Extension Line: Merseyside
- Offchurch Greenway: Leamington Spa to Rugby, Warwickshire (1.5 mi (2.4 km))
- Onny Trail: Craven Arms to Horderley, Shropshire
- Outwood Trail: Prestwich to Radcliffe, Greater Manchester (2.6 mi (4.2 km))
- Padiham Greenway: Padiham, Lancashire (2 mi (3.2 km))
- Parkend to Cinderford, Gloucestershire
- Parkland Walk: Finsbury Park to Alexandra Palace, north London (3.1 mi (5.0 km))
- Pedersen Way: Uley to Cam and Dursley, Gloucestershire
- Pegasus Way: Okehampton to Halwill, Devon
- Pentewan Trail: St Austell to Pentewan, Cornwall (8 mi (12.9 km))
- Perry Way: part of the Stafford-Wellington line, Shropshire (3 mi (4.8 km))
- Phoenix Trail: Thame, Oxfordshire, to Princes Risborough, Buckinghamshire (7 mi (11.3 km))
- Pittington Way: Pittington to Hetton-le-Hole, County Durham (0.9 mi (1.4 km))
- Plym Valley Cycle Trail: Clearbrook to Marsh Mills, Devon (7 mi (11.3 km))
- Preston to Bamber Bridge, Lancashire
- Preston to Grimsagh, Lancashire
- Princetown Railway Walk: Princetown to Dousland, Devon
- Raisby Way: Trimdon to Coxhoe, County Durham (1.6 mi (2.6 km))
- Radstock West to Frome, Somerset
- Rea Brook Way: Shrewsbury, Shropshire (1 mi (1.6 km))
- Red Squirrel Trail: Cowes to Sandown, Isle of Wight (14 mi (23 km))
- Red Squirrel Trail: Shanklin to Wroxall, Isle of Wight
- Ripley Greenway: Ripley, Derbyshire (2 mi (3.2 km))
- Rodwell Trail: Weymouth to Wyke Regis, Dorset (2 mi (3.2 km))
- Roe Green Loop: Roe Green to Monton, Lancashire
- Rowthorn Trail: Rowthorn and Hardwick, Derbyshire, to Pleasley Colliery, Nottinghamshire
- Saddleworth Linear: between Greenfield, Uppermill and Dobcross, Greater Manchester (4 mi (6.4 km))
- Sandringham Railway Path: King's Lynn (Tennyson Avenue to A1078), Norfolk (1.7 mi (2.7 km))
- Scarborough & Whitby Rail Trail: Scarborough to Whitby, North Yorkshire
- Sett Valley Trail: Hayfield to New Mills Central, Derbyshire (2.5 mi (4.0 km))
- Severn and Wye Railway: in part, Forest of Dean, Gloucestershire
- Sewell Cutting Nature Reserve: Stanbridgeford to Dunstable North, Bedfordshire (2.2 mi (3.5 km))
- Sherburn Way: Sherburn Hill, County Durham (1.4 mi (2.3 km))
- Silkin Way: Malins Lee to Coalport (Ironbridge), Shropshire
- Skegby Trail: Sutton-in-Ashfield to Pleasley Colliery, Nottinghamshire (5 mi (8 km))
- Southport and Cheshire Lines Extension Railway: Merseyside/Lancashire
- South Staffordshire Railway Walk: Castlecroft to Wall Heath, Staffordshire (5.5 mi (8.9 km))
- South Tyne Trail: Haltwhistle, Northumberland, to Alston, Cumbria (13 mi (21 km))
- Southwell Trail: Southwell to Bilsthorpe, Nottinghamshire (7.5 mi (12.1 km))
- Spa Trail and Viking Way: Horncastle to Woodhall Spa (4.8 mi (7.7 km))
- Spen Valley Greenway: Oakenshaw to Dewsbury, West Yorkshire (7 mi (11.3 km))
- Stockley Trail: Bolsover Castle, Derbyshire (2 mi (3.2 km))
- Stratford Greenway: Stratford-upon-Avon to Long Marston, Warwickshire (4.5 mi (7.2 km))
- Stroud Valleys Trail: Nailsworth to Stonehouse, Gloucestershire (5 mi (8 km))
- Strawberry Line Trail: Yatton to Cheddar, Somerset
- Sudbury to Long Melford, Suffolk (3 mi (4.8 km))
- Tarka Trail (parts): Braunton to Meeth, via Barnstaple, north Devon (31 mi (50 km))
- Swindon to Rushey Platt, Wiltshire
- Tees Railway Path: Middleton-in-Teesdale to Cotherstone, County Durham (5.5 mi (8.9 km))
- Tenterden - The Old Railway Path: Tenterden Town to St Michael's, Kent (1 mi (1.6 km))
- Testway: Stonymarsh to Stockbridge, Hampshire (5 mi (8.0 km))
- Tetbury Trail: Tetbury to Culkerton, Gloucestershire (3 mi (4.8 km))
- Teversal Trail: Kirkby-in-Ashfield to Pleasley Colliery, Nottinghamshire.
- Thornhill Trail: Bamford, Derbyshire (2 mi (3.2 km))
- Tissington Trail: Parsley Hay to Ashbourne, Derbyshire (13 mi (21 km))
- Trans Pennine Trail: Dunford Bridge, Derbyshire, to Stocksbridge, South Yorkshire (10.1 mi (16.3 km))
- Trans Pennine Trail: Latchford to Broadheath, Cheshire
- Two Tunnels Greenway (3.5 mi (5.6 km)) and Colliers Way (2.5 mi (4.0 km)): Bath Green Park to Wellow, Somerset
- Tyne Riverside Country Park: Newcastle to Wylam, Tyne and Wear (4 mi (6.4 km))
- Varsity Way: Bedford St Johns to Sandy, 4.3 mi (6.9 km) in Bedfordshire
- Walker Riverside Park: St Peters to Carville, Tyne and Wear
- Waskerley Way: Consett to Stanhope, County Durham (9.7 mi (15.6 km))
- Water Rail Way: Lincoln to Boston, Lincolnshire (33 mi (53 km))
- Weavers' Way: Bengate to Stalham, Norfolk (4.5 mi (7.2 km))
- Weavers' Way: North Walsham to Aylsham North, Norfolk (4.5 mi (7.2 km))
- West Auckland to Ramshaw: County Durham
- West Bridgford Green Line: Nottinghamshire
- Wetherby (York Road) to Thorp Arch: West Yorkshire
- Wetherby (York Road) to Spofforth: West/North Yorkshire
- Whitegate Way: Winsford to Cuddington, Cheshire (6 mi (9.7 km))
- Whitehaven to Ennerdale, Cumbria (10 mi (16.1 km))
- Wirral Way: West Kirby, Merseyside, to Hooton, Cheshire (12.2 mi (19.6 km))
- Worth Way: Three Bridges to East Grinstead, West Sussex (7 mi (11.3 km))
- Wray Valley Trail: Bovey Tracey to Moretonhampstead, Devon (7 mi (11.3 km))
- Wye Valley Greenway: Chepstow to Tintern, Gloucestershire (5 mi (8.0 km))
- Yeovil Country Park: Yeovil Pen Mill to Hendford, Somerset (1.5 mi (2.4 km))
- York to Osbaldwick, North Yorkshire
- York to Riccall Railway Path: North Yorkshire (14 mi (23 km)).

==== Northern Ireland ====
- Comber Greenway: Dee Street, east Belfast, to Comber, County Down (7 mi (11.3 km))
- Foyle Valley Cycle Route: Derry to Strabane (21 mi (34 km)).

==== Scotland ====
- Ayr to Greenan, Ayrshire
- Ballachulish to North Connel, (in parts, now National Cycle Route no. 78)
- Corstorphine to Balgreen, Edinburgh
- Dava Way: Forres to Grantown-on-Spey (West) (24 mi (39 km))
- Deeside Way: Aberdeen to Ballater (41 mi (66 km))
- Devon Way: Dollar to Tillicoultry (3.2 mi (5.1 km))
- Elgin to Lossiemouth
- Formartine and Buchan Way: Dyce to Fraserburgh and Peterhead (53 mi (85 km))
- Haddington to Longniddry Railway Walk
- Hillend Loch Railway Path (15 mi (24 km)) Airdrie to Bathgate (14 mi (23 km))
- Hopeman to Burghead
- Innocent Railway Cycle Path: Newington to Brunstane (8.2 mi (13.2 km))
- Old Fordell Train Line Trail: Cowdenbeath (5 mi (8 km))
- Paisley and Clyde Coast railway path: Paisley Canal to Gourock railway path
- Pencaitland Railway Walk: East Lothian (6.5 mi (10.5 km))
- Rob Roy Way: Callander to Killin
- Speyside Way: Craigellachie to Grantown-on-Spey (East) (31 mi (50 km))
- Strathkelvin Railway Path: Gartcosh to Strathblane (6 mi (9.7 km))
- Tweed Valley Railway Path: Peebles to Innerleithen, Scottish Borders (5 mi (8 km))
- Water of Leith Walkway: Balerno to Slateford, Edinburgh (5.3 mi (8.5 km)).

==== Wales ====
- Aberaeron Cycle Path: (2.8 mi (4.5 km))
- Brunel Trail: Johnston to Neyland
- Bryngwyn to Tryfan Junction, Gwynedd
- Cilgerran to Cardigan
- Clyne Valley Country Park (5 mi (8 km))
- Elan Valley Trail: Rhayader to Craig Goch Dam (9 mi (14.5 km))
- Greenfield Valley: Holywell Junction to Holywell Town, Flintshire (1.5 mi (2.4 km))
- Lôn Eifion, Gwynedd (12 mi (19.3 km))
- Milford Haven, Pembrokeshire (0.5 mi (0.8 km))
- Lôn Las Cymru; Cardiff to Holyhead (National Cycle Route 8) (Note: Some of its route follows the trackbed of former railway lines, such as Lôn Las Menai, Lôn Eifion, the Mawddach Trail and the Taff Trail; in other places, the route is on public highways.)
- Lôn Las Menai, Gwynedd (4 mi (6.4 km))
- Lôn Las Ogwen: in parts, from Porth Penrhyn, on the north coast, to Llyn Ogwen in Snowdonia(4 mi (6.4 km))
- Mawddach Trail: Morfa Mawddach to Dolgellau (8 mi (12.9 km))
- Prestatyn to Dyserth (2.5 mi (4.0 km))
- Swansea to Gowerton
- Swiss Valley Cycle Route: Llanelli to Cross Hands Halt, Carmarthenshire (10.8 mi (17 km))
- Taff Trail: in parts, between Cardiff Bay and Brecon (55 mi (89 km))
- Ystwyth Trail: Aberystwyth to Tregaron (21 mi (34 km)).

==== Crown dependencies ====
- Steam Heritage Trail: Douglas to Peel, Isle of Man (11 mi (18 km))
- The Railway Walk: St Aubin to Corbière, Jersey (3.7 mi (6.0 km)).

== North America ==
=== Bermuda ===
- Bermuda Railway.

=== Mexico ===
- The abandoned Mexico City to Cuernavaca line (Linea C), transformed into a "ciclopista" or "ciclovía" (bicycle trail)

== Oceania ==
=== Australia ===
Rails trails of significant length include:

Name	State	Length	Location	Accessibility										Ref
Name	State	Length	Location	Walking	Mountain biking	Horse riding	Touring hybrid cycling	Four wheel driving	Wheelchair suitable	Pram suitable	In-line skating and scooters	Two wheel drive following	Dogs on leash allowed	Ref
Munda Biddi Trail	Western Australia	1,060 km (660 mi)	20 km (12 mi) west of Perth (northern end point)	●	●									
Great Victorian Rail Trail	Victoria	134 km (83 mi)	110 km (68 mi) north of Melbourne	●	●	●	●		●	●				
Brisbane Valley Rail Trail	Queensland	161 km (100 mi)	70 km (43 mi) west of Brisbane	●	●	●								
Murray to the Mountains Rail Trail	Victoria	116 km (72 mi)	250 km (160 mi) north-east of Melbourne	●	●		●		●	●				
East Gippsland Rail Trail	Victoria	94 km (58 mi)	280 km (170 mi) east of Melbourne	●	●	●	●							
Kilkivan - Kingaroy Rail Trail	Queensland	89 km (55 mi)	225 km (140 mi) north-west of Brisbane	●	●	●	●						●	
Railway Reserves Heritage Trail	Western Australia	82 km (51 mi)	19 km (12 mi) east of Perth	●	●	●								
Great Southern Rail Trail and Tarra Trail	Victoria	74 km (46 mi)	130 km (81 mi) east of Melbourne	●	●	●	●		●	●				
High Country Rail Trail	Victoria	65 km (40 mi)	300 km (190 mi) north-east of Melbourne	●	●	●	●		●					
Gippsland Plains Rail Trail	Victoria	63 km (39 mi)	190 km (120 mi) east of Melbourne	●	●	●	●							
Ballarat-Skipton Rail Trail	Victoria	57 km (35 mi)	110 km (68 mi) north-west of Melbourne	●	●		●							
Mt Garnet to Lappa Junction Rail Trail	Queensland	55 km (34 mi)	190 km (120 mi) south-west of Cairns	●	●			●						
Denmark to Nornalup Rail Trail	Western Australia	54.5 km (33.9 mi)	415 km (258 mi) south of Perth	●	●	●								
The Reisling and Rattler Trail	South Australia	54 km (34 mi)	130 km (81 mi) north of Adelaide	●	●		●		●	●				
O'Keefe Rail Trail	Victoria	50 km (31 mi)	150 km (93 mi) north-east of Melbourne	●	●		●							
Old Beechy Rail Trail	Victoria	50 km (31 mi)	152 km (94 mi) south-west of Melbourne	●	●									

=== New Zealand ===
- Dun Mountain Trail
- Little River Rail Trail
- Otago Central Rail Trail
- Remutaka Rail Trail.
