= Hadleigh railway station =

Former railway station in England

Hadleigh
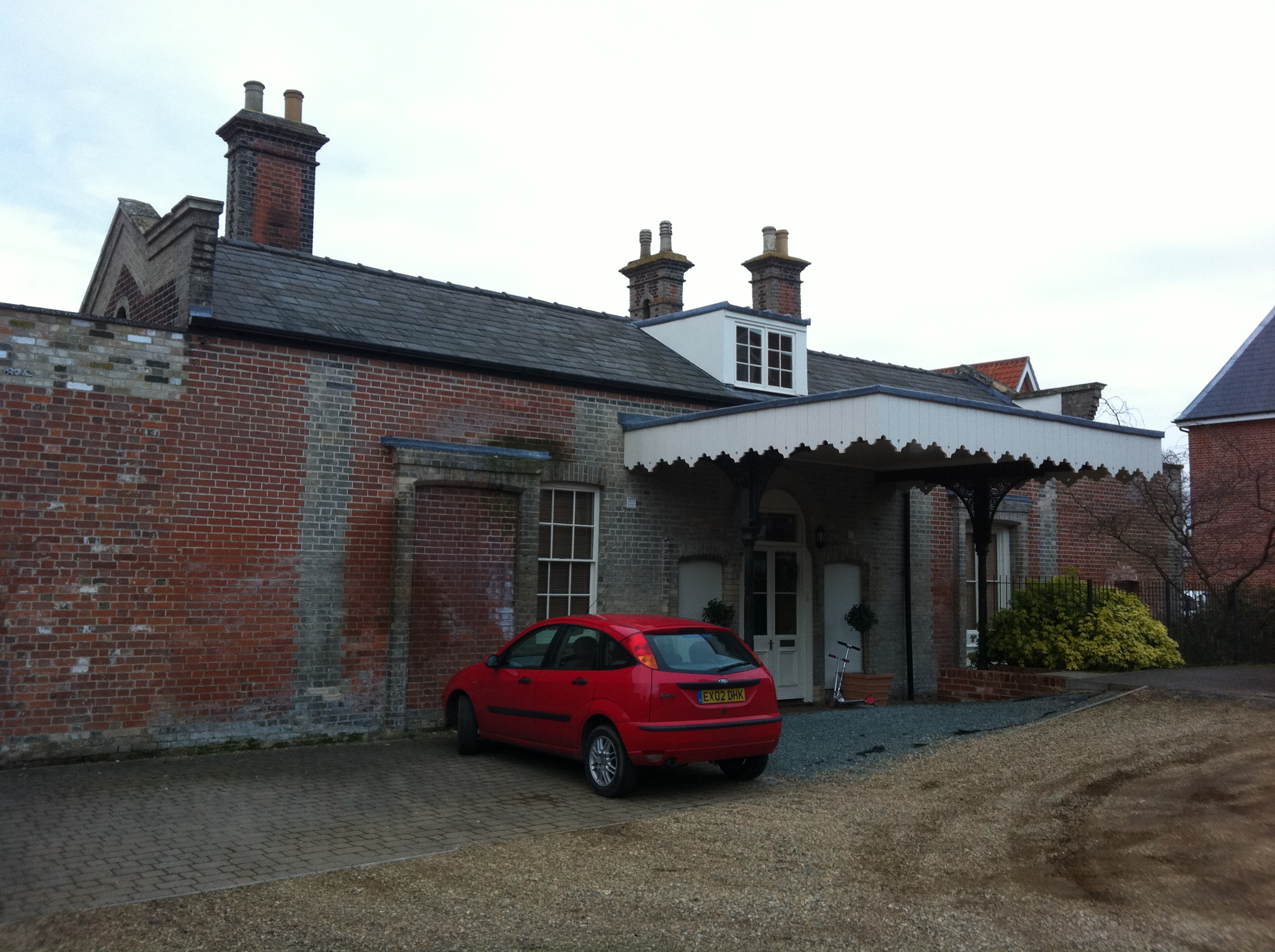
- Hadleigh railway station in 2011

General information
- Location: Hadleigh, Babergh; England
- Coordinates: 52.0407°N 0.9605°E
- Platforms: 1

Other information
- Status: Disused

History
- Original company: Eastern Union & Hadleigh Junction Railway
- Pre-grouping: Great Eastern Railway
- Post-grouping: London and North Eastern Railway

Key dates
- 2 September 1847: Opened
- 29 February 1932: Closed to passengers
- 19 April 1965: closed to freight
Location

Hadleigh railway station was a station in Hadleigh, Suffolk, the terminus of the Hadleigh Railway, a short branch line from Bentley Junction. The line opened in 1847. The original intermediate stations were at Bentley Church, Capel and Raydon Wood.

The terminus had goods sidings on both the south-western and north-eastern sides, the latter serving malt houses and which was also used as a running round loop. There was also a small engine shed.

The station building was very ornate, if somewhat dwarfed by the adjacent malt houses, with attractive coupled chimneys and unusual windows with the frame and arch of stone.

The decline in passenger numbers using the branch can be seen in the patronage figures, which were 14,447 in 1923 compared to 5,086 just five years later. The line closed to passenger traffic in 1932, although freight services lingered on until 1965. On 20 October 1988 the station became a Grade II listed building.

A proposal to extend services by building a light railway between Hadleigh and Long Melford was reported in the Haverhill Echo on 10 March 1900, but that was not done.

The station building still stands and is in use as a private residence, with newer dwellings around it. The route to Raydon Wood is accessible as the Hadleigh Railway Walk.

Preceding station	Disused railways	Following station
Terminus	Great Eastern Railway; Hadleigh Railway	Raydon Wood
