= Robert Bradstreet =

English poet (1766 - 1836)

Robert Bradstreet (1766–1836) was an English poet.

He was the son of Robert Bradstreet, and was born at Higham, Suffolk, in 1766, and educated under the care of the Rev. T. Foster, rector of Halesworth in Suffolk. On 4 June 1782, he was admitted a pensioner of St John's College, Cambridge, and he became a fellow-commoner of that society on 23 January 1786. The dates of his degrees are B.A. 1786, M.A. 1789. Bradstreet owned an estate at Bentley in Suffolk, with a mansion called Bentley Grove, which, it is believed, he inherited from his father. He lived abroad for several years, witnessing many of the scenes of the French Revolution, which he at one time advocated. He married in France, but took advantage of the facility with which the marriage tie could there be dissolved, and on his return to England he married, in 1800, Miss Adham of Mason's Bridge, near Hadleigh, Suffolk, by whom he had a numerous family. For some time he lived at Higham Hall, Raydon, but removing thence, he resided at various places, and at length died at Southampton on 13 May 1836.

He was the author of The Sabine Farm, a poem: into which is interwoven a series of translations, chiefly descriptive of the Villa and Life of Horace, occasioned by an excursion from Rome to Licenza, London, 1810, 8vo. There are seven engraved plates in the work, and an appendix contains 'Miscellaneous Odes from Horace.'
