= Airdrie to Bathgate =

Airdrie to Bathgate may refer to:

- Airdrie–Bathgate rail link, a railway in central Scotland, UK reopened in 2010
- Hillend Loch Railway Path, a footpath which formerly ran over the current railway route before being relocated when the railway reopened
- Bathgate and Coatbridge Railway, the original railway linking the two towns
