= Listed buildings in Raydon =

Historic structures in Suffolk, England

Raydon is a village and civil parish in the Babergh District of Suffolk, England. It contains 19 listed buildings that are recorded in the National Heritage List for England. Of these one is grade II* and 18 are grade II.

This list is based on the information retrieved online from Historic England.

== Key ==
Grade	Criteria
I	Buildings that are of exceptional interest
II*	Particularly important buildings of more than special interest
II	Buildings that are of special interest

== Listing ==
Name	Grade	Location	Type	Completed (Note: The date given is the date used by Historic England as significant for the initial building or that of an important part in the structure's description.)	Date designated	Grid ref. (Note: The grid reference is based on the British national grid reference system, sometimes known as OSGB36, used by the Ordnance Survey.) Geo-coordinates	Notes	Entry number (Note: The "List Entry Number" is a unique number assigned to each listed building and scheduled monument by Historic England.)	Image	Wikidata
Layham Hall	II	B 1070			22 February 1955	TM0402339921; 52°01′13″N 0°58′19″E		1193181	Upload Photo	Q26487839
Valley House	II	B 1070			29 July 1987	TM0482639045; 52°00′43″N 0°59′00″E		1036967	Upload Photo	Q26288645
Wayside	II	Higham Hill			29 July 1987	TM0338337892; 52°00′08″N 0°57′42″E		1193203	Upload Photo	Q26487857
Barn to Spider Hall	II	Lower Raydon			22 February 1955	TM0399438474; 52°00′26″N 0°58′15″E		1351627	Upload Photo	Q26634711
Lodge to Spider Hall	II	Lower Raydon			7 October 1981	TM0364838448; 52°00′26″N 0°57′57″E		1036968	Upload Photo	Q26288646
Ponds Farmhouse	II	Lower Raydon			22 February 1955	TM0384939061; 52°00′45″N 0°58′08″E		1193243	Upload Photo	Q26487897
Spider Hall	II	Lower Raydon			22 February 1955	TM0399438514; 52°00′27″N 0°58′15″E		1193209	Upload Photo	Q26487864
Five Bay Barn at Sulleys Manor Farm	II	Sulleys Hill			22 February 1955	TM0405737982; 52°00′10″N 0°58′17″E		1193263	Upload Photo	Q26487919
Fox Farmhouse	II	Sulleys Hill			29 July 1987	TM0351838010; 52°00′12″N 0°57′49″E		1036969	Upload Photo	Q26288647
Six Bay Barn at Sulleys Manor Farm	II	Sulleys Hill			22 February 1955	TM0403237986; 52°00′10″N 0°58′16″E		1351628	Upload Photo	Q26634712
Sulleys Manor	II	Sulleys Hill			22 February 1955	TM0404938052; 52°00′12″N 0°58′17″E		1286268	Upload Photo	Q26574882
Church Farmhouse	II	The Street			29 July 1987	TM0497838563; 52°00′27″N 0°59′07″E		1036971	Upload Photo	Q26288649
Church of St Mary	II*	The Street	church building		22 February 1955	TM0493138617; 52°00′29″N 0°59′04″E		1286247	Church of St Mary More images	Q17534304
Raydon House Nursing Home	II	The Street			22 February 1955	TM0513538228; 52°00′16″N 0°59′14″E		1193318	Upload Photo	Q26487969
Raydon War Memorial	II	The Street, IP7 5LW	war memorial		27 April 2020	TM0497538624; 52°00′29″N 0°59′07″E		1466689	Raydon War Memorial More images	Q97457661
Ruggs	II	The Street			29 July 1987	TM0504438547; 52°00′27″N 0°59′10″E		1351629	Upload Photo	Q26634713
The Post Office and Adjoining Premises	II	The Street			29 July 1987	TM0500138698; 52°00′32″N 0°59′08″E		1036970	Upload Photo	Q26288648
Timbers	II	The Street			22 February 1955	TM0507638511; 52°00′26″N 0°59′12″E		1036972	Upload Photo	Q26288650
Raydon Hall	II	Woodlands Road			29 July 1987	TM0529039055; 52°00′43″N 0°59′24″E		1193333	Upload Photo	Q26487983

== See also ==
- Grade I listed buildings in Suffolk
- Grade II* listed buildings in Suffolk

== Sources ==
- Bettely, James; Pevsner, Nikolaus (2015) [1961], Suffolk: West, The Buildings of England, New Haven and London: Yale University Press, ISBN 978-0-300-19655-9
