= Bike path =

Bikeway separated from motorized traffic

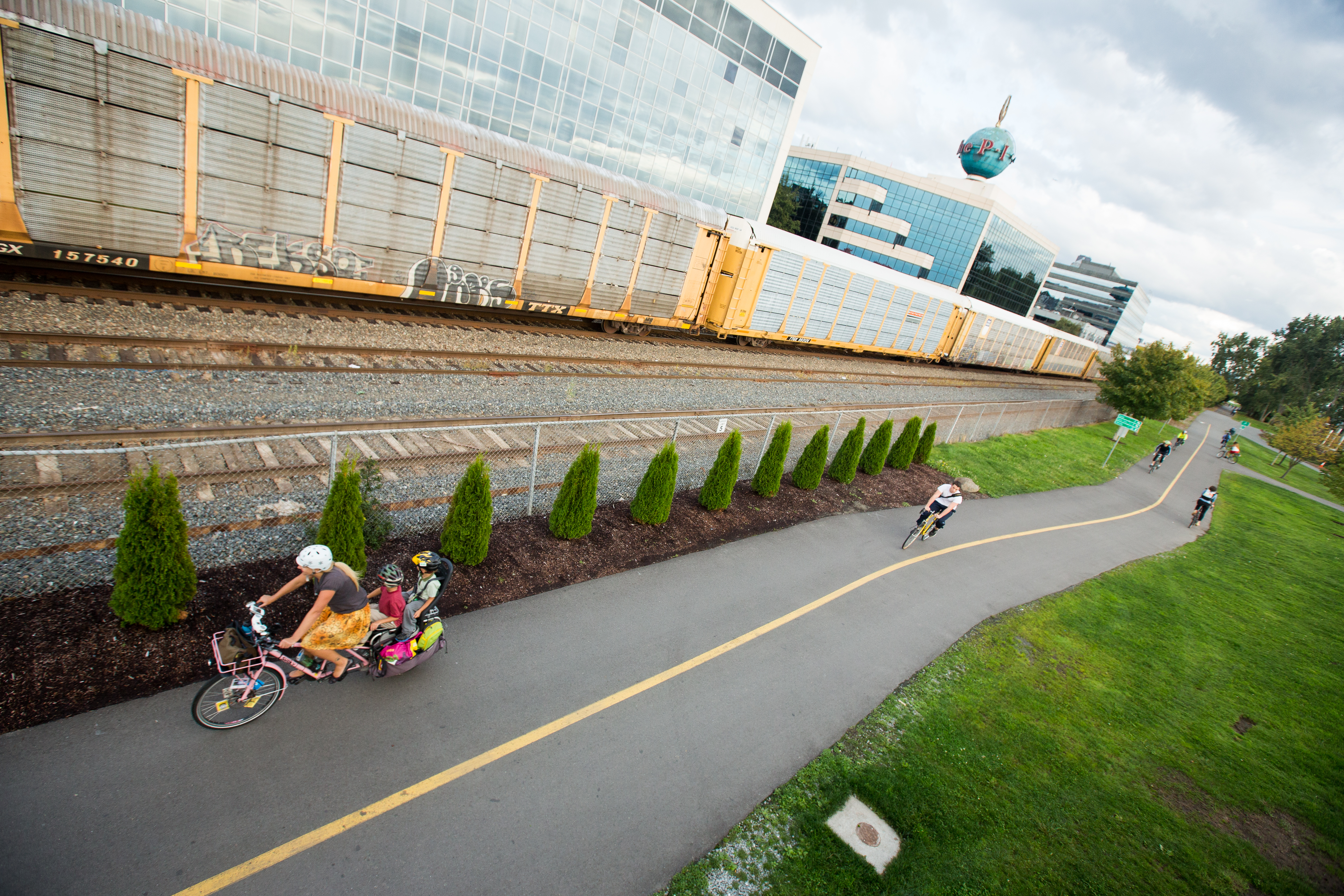
The Elliott Bay Trail in Seattle, Washington, USA.

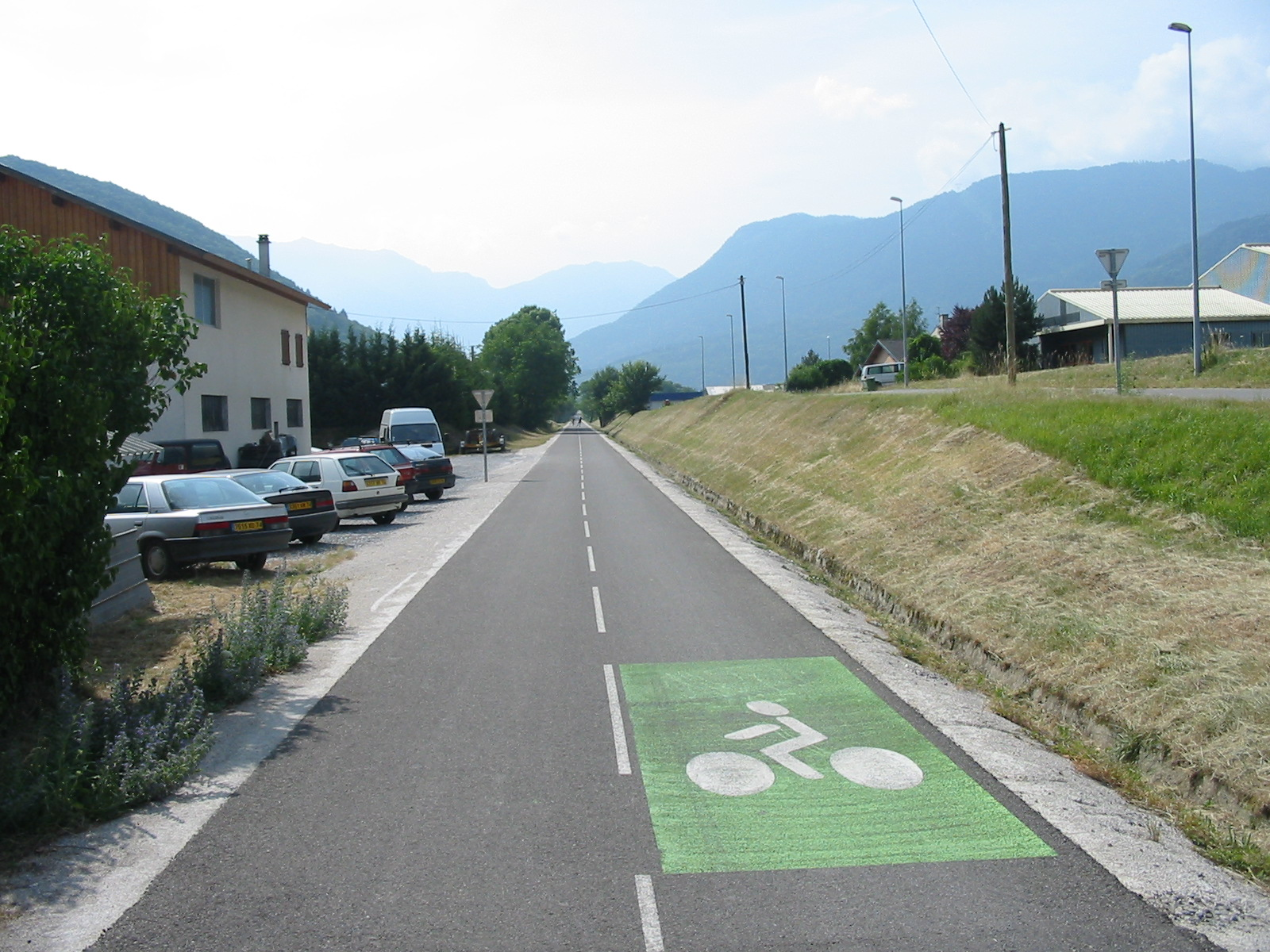
Dedicated bicycle path separated from motor traffic

A bike path or a cycle path is a bikeway separated from motorized traffic and dedicated to cycling or shared with pedestrians or other non-motorized users. In the US a bike path sometimes encompasses shared use paths, "multi-use path", or "Class III bikeway". It may or may not have a center divider or stripe to prevent head-on collisions. In the UK, a shared-use footway or multi-use path is for use by both cyclists and pedestrians.

== Bike paths with independent rights-of-way ==
Bike paths that follow independent rights-of-way are often used to promote recreational cycling. In Northern European countries, cycling tourism represents a significant proportion of overall tourist activity. Extensive interurban bike path networks can be found in countries such as Denmark or the Netherlands, which has had a national system of cycle routes since 1993. These networks may use routes dedicated exclusively to cycle traffic or minor rural roads whose use is otherwise restricted to local motor traffic and agricultural machinery.

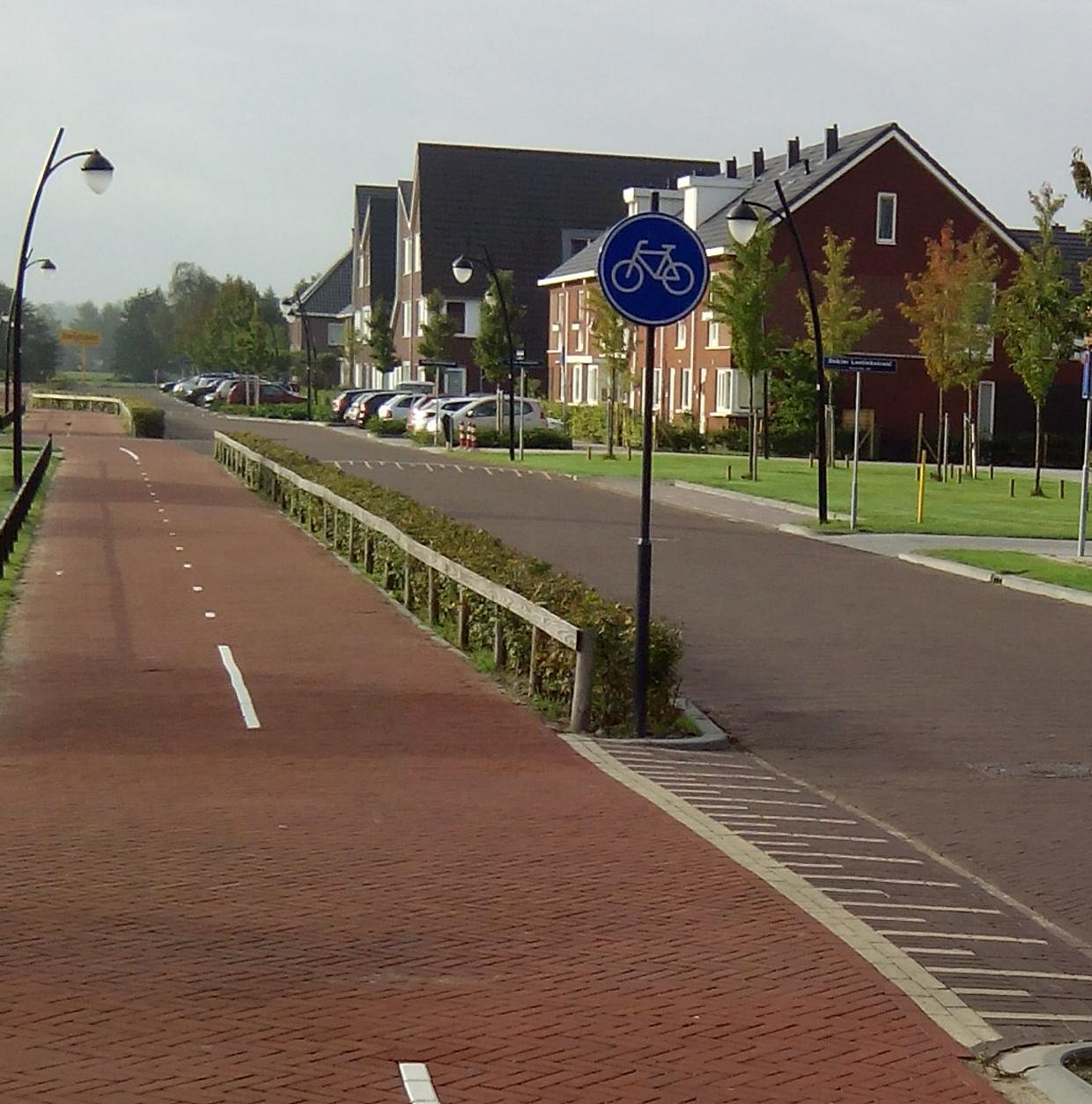
This Fietspad or Bicycle Path is in the Netherlands safely linking housing.

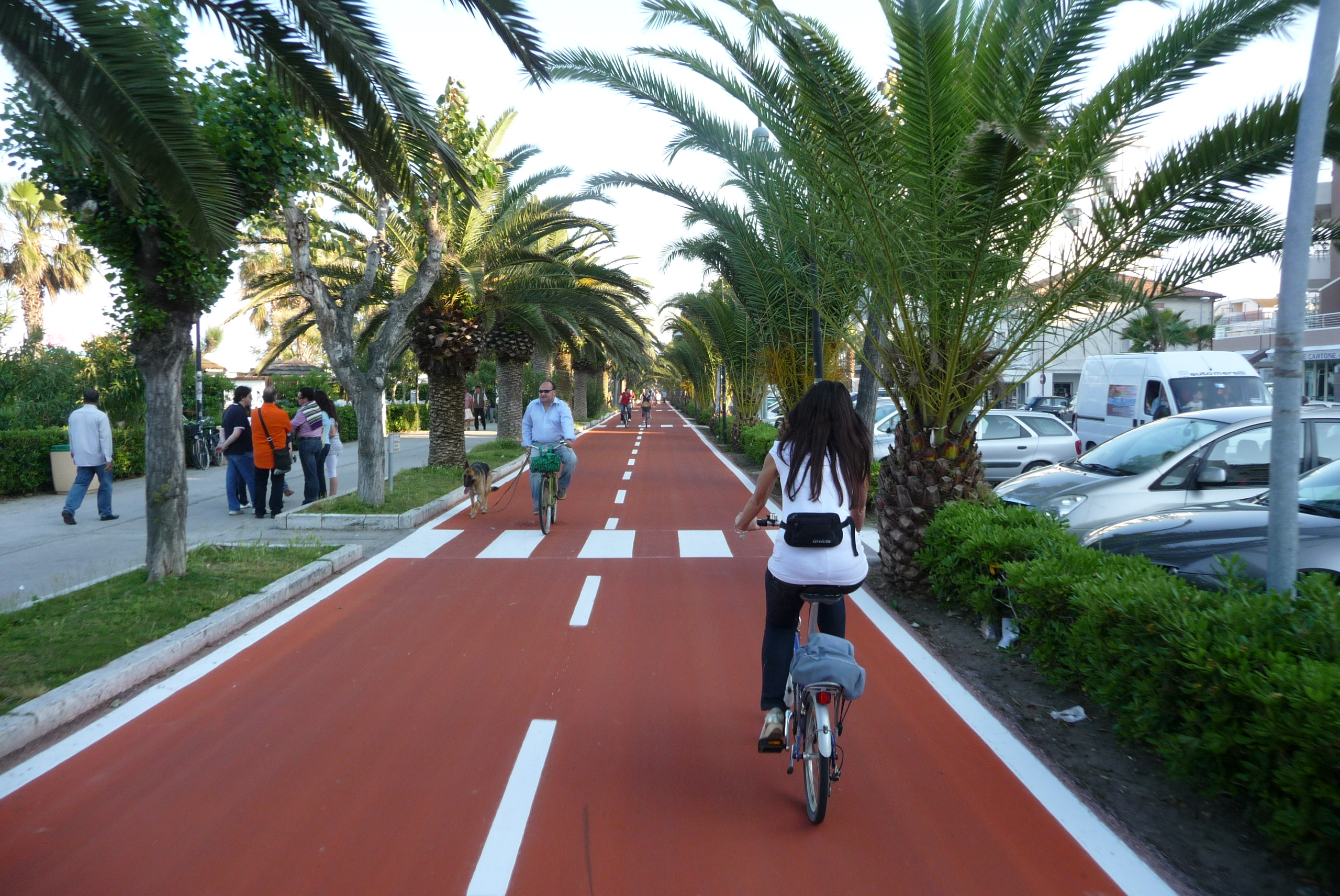
A stretch of Ciclovia Adriatica, in Italy

The Fietspad or Bicycle Path in the Netherlands is logically constructed to link shops, housing, stations, schools, workplaces for everyday cycling. The more sensible approach is based on efforts to increase utility cycling. In countries like Denmark, the Netherlands and Germany the high levels of utility cycling also includes shopping trips e.g. by 2007 9% of all shopping trips in Germany were by bicycle.

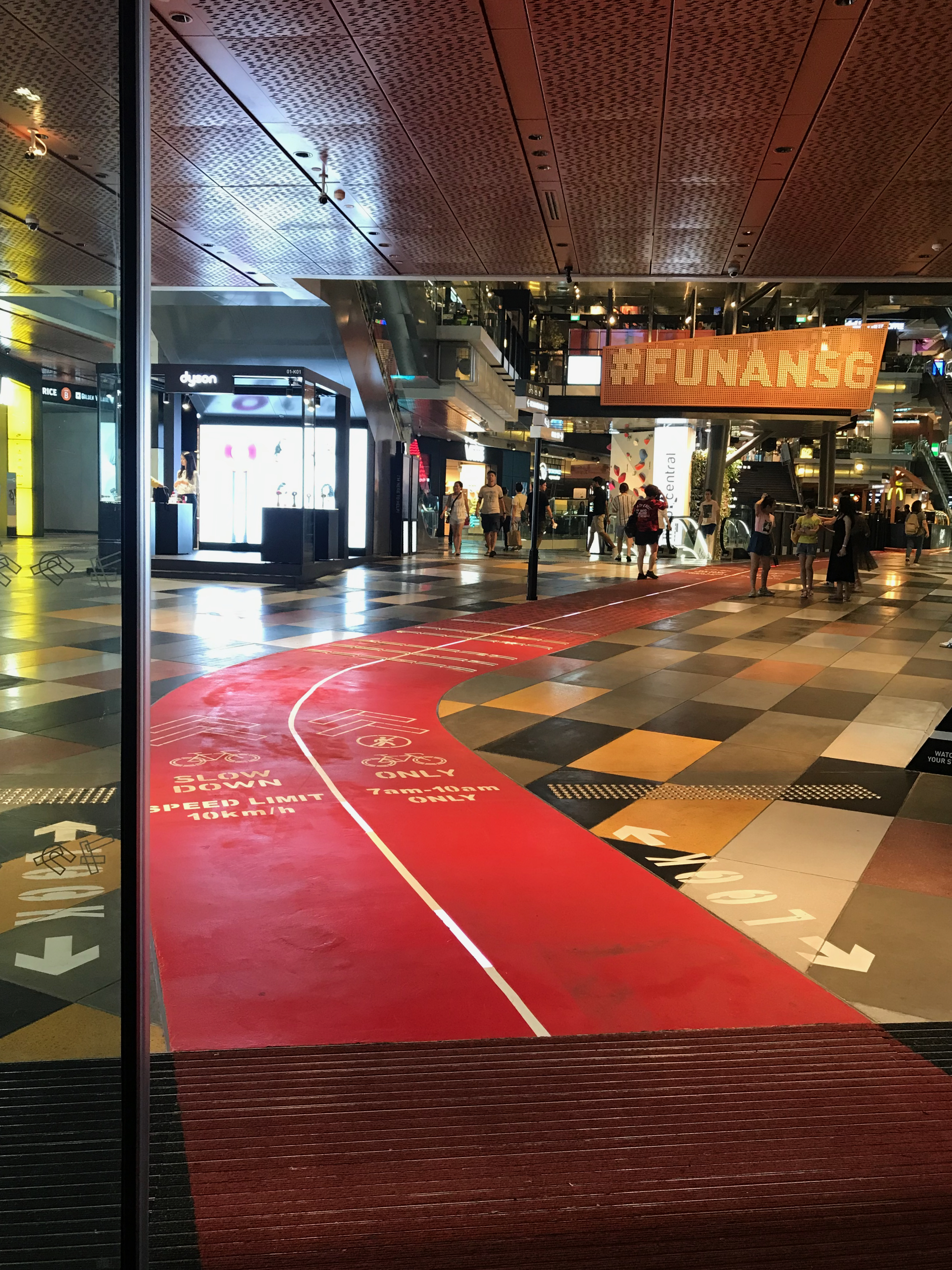
Bike path transitioned from outdoor to indoor at Funan Mall in Singapore

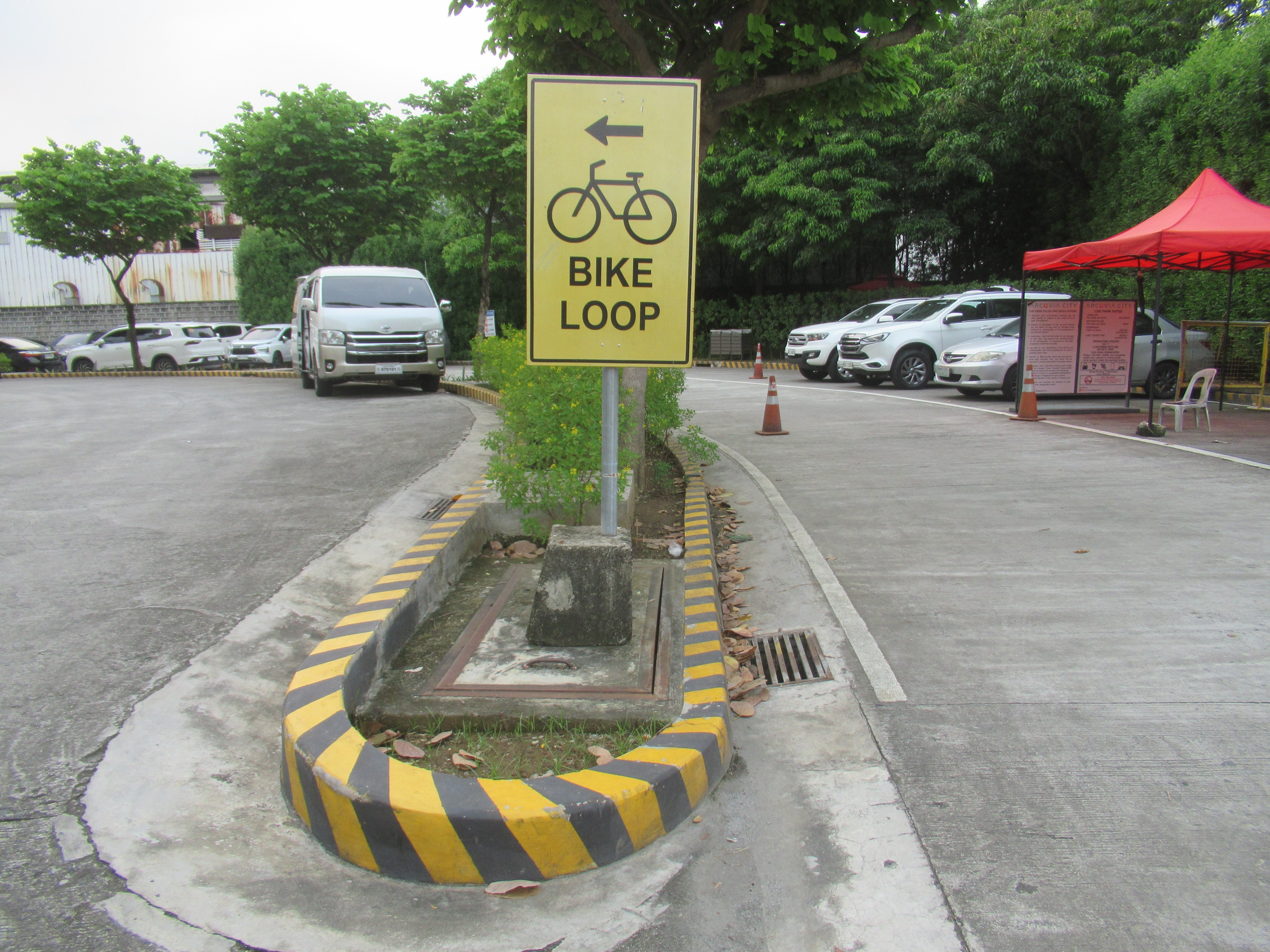
Bike loop in Arcovia City

Although it is unusual, to connect people to places, bike paths may be extended into indoor spaces. An example is the indoor bike path at Funan Mall in Singapore that is extended from a shared-use biking and walking path along North Bridge Road.

The UK has recently implemented the National Cycle Network.

Where available, these routes are often rail trails making use of abandoned railway corridors. A prominent example in the UK is the Bristol & Bath Railway Path, a 21-kilometre (13 mi) path for walkers and cyclists that is part of National Cycle Route 4. Other UK examples include The Ebury Way Cycle Path, The Alban Way, the Hillend Loch Railway Path and the Nicky Line. In 2003 the longest continuous bike path in Europe was opened, along the Albacete-Valdeganga highway in Spain, a distance of 22 kilometres (14 mi). Bogota's Bike Paths Network (Ciclorutas de Bogotá in Spanish), designed and built during the administration of Mayor Enrique Peñalosa attracts significant recreational use. Numerous cycle links between regions are being developed in Italy. The most important is the Ciclovia Adriatica, partially completed which extends, at times, from Trieste to Santa Maria di Leuca.

The relative safety of bike paths that follow independent rights-of-way closed to motorized traffic is difficult to assess. In terms of car/bicycle collisions, this is clearly mediated by how the bike path network rejoins the main road network. In the English town of Milton Keynes, a study showed that cyclists using the off-road Milton Keynes redway system had on a per journey basis a significantly higher rate of fatal car-bicycle collisions at path/roadway crossings than cyclists on ordinary roads. This safety can be altered substantially by design. For example, the Dutch Simultaneous Green Junction design has a nearly flawless record when it comes to accommodating cyclists at traffic light junctions.

== Shared use path ==
Bike paths help combat climate change, and a third of European Union citizens interviewed for the European Investment Bank climate survey want more because of this, with highest support in Estonia, Slovakia and Poland.

In many jurisdictions bike paths are shared with pedestrians, but there is a wide variety of quality in helping to minimize cyclist-pedestrian conflicts.

== Pop-up bike paths ==
Pop-up bike paths are created rapidly in response to unforeseen events, usually with short timescales between their inception and implementation. The creation of pop-up bike paths typically involves "reallocating road space to better enable this shift and make it safer for people who choose to walk, cycle or wheel for essential trips or for exercise".

== See also ==
- Bike lane
- Bikeway safety, including studies on the safety of bike paths
- Bikeway and legislation
- Cycle track
- Cycling infrastructure
- Greenway (landscape)
