= Testway =

Cycle route in Hampshire, England

Coordinates: 51.08023°N 1.50178°W

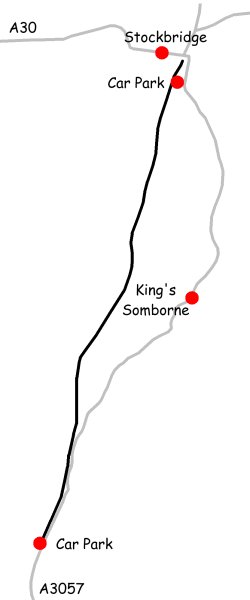
The route and nearby major roads

Testway is a 5-mile (8 km) off-road cycle path in Hampshire, England. The path follows the route of the disused Sprat and Winkle Line between Stonymarsh and Stockbridge and runs in between the River Test and the A3057 road. The Testway is part of regional cycle route 65 which connects national cycle route 24 to Chilbolton.

There is parking at the southern end of the cycle path, however there is a 6-foot (1.8 m) height restriction on the entrance to the car park. There is also parking close by to the northern end of the cycle path off Cow Drove Hill.
