= Senda del Oso =

Coordinates: 43°10′12″N 6°5′50″W

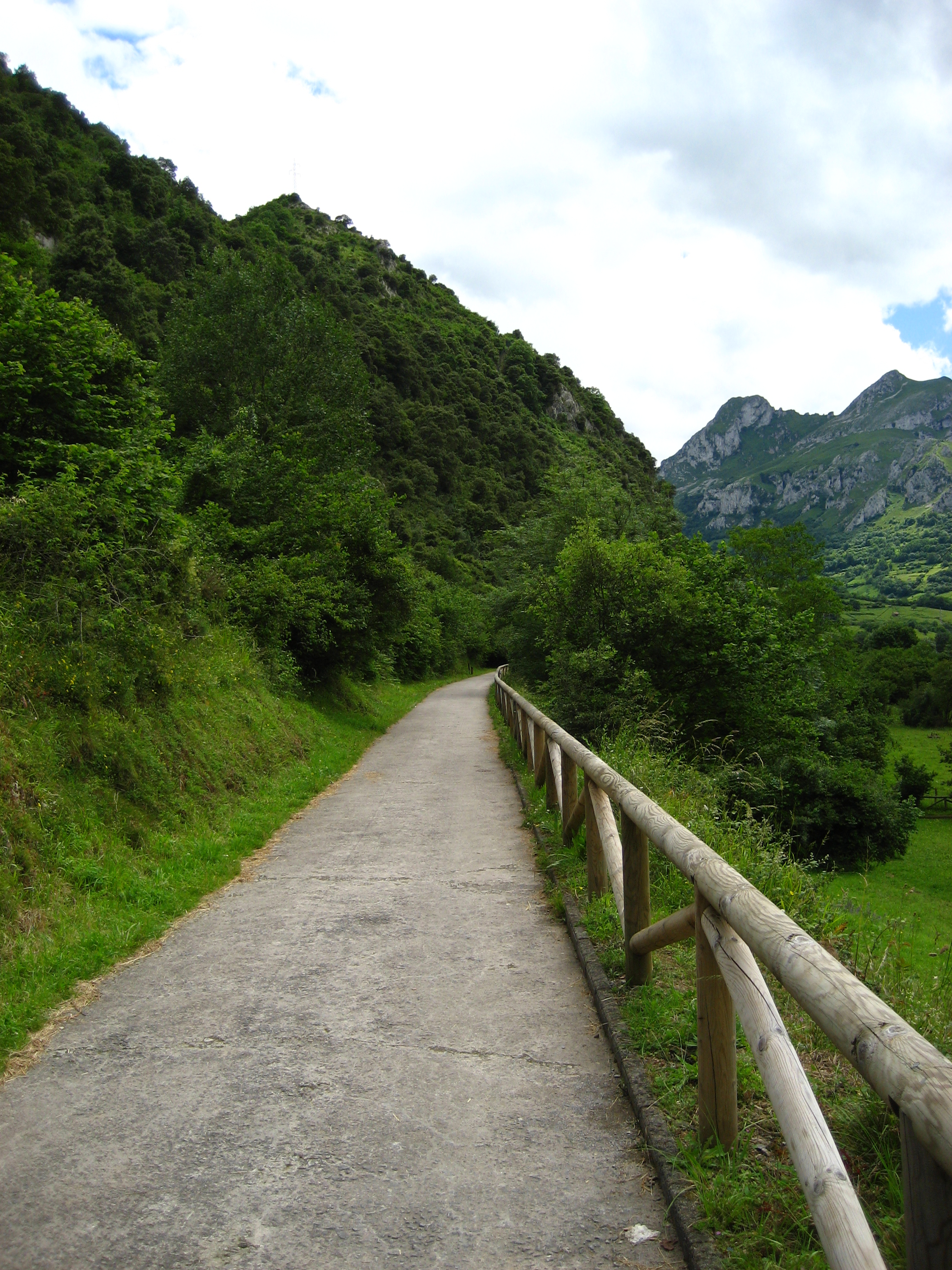
Segment of la Senda del oso, “The Bear’s Path Greenway,” Asturias, Spain

The Senda del Oso (Spanish: Bear's Path) is a 50-kilometre (31 mi) rail-trail, hiking and bicycle path running through Asturias in northern Spain, running approximately between Entragu and Santa Marina in the south to Trubia in the north, near Oviedo. Originally a mining rail line used until 1963, the Senda is now a tourist destination for the area, and was featured in a Rails to Trails article in 2010. The path goes through some of the last remaining brown bear habitat in Spain, and indeed, was partly inspired by a nearby bear conservation project.

== Maintenance ==
Senda del Oso was the site of two accidents involving a cyclist and a hiker. In 2019, a 60-year-old cyclist died after a railing he was leaning on gave way, causing an 8-meter fall. Weeks later, a Dutch hiker was injured in a 3-meter fall when another railing failed. The Asturias High Court ruled that the local municipalities responsible for the trail are liable, ordering them to pay €256,000 to the cyclist's family and €22,634 to the injured hiker. The court found the municipalities negligent in failing to properly maintain the trail's safety features, despite repeated complaints about the poor condition of the railings. An inspection after the accidents identified over 200 safety and maintenance issues along the trail.

In 2023 it was announced that the trail will receive a 306,000 euro investment to improve its signage, pavement, furniture, and railings. The funding comes from Next Generation EU funds as part of a broader 2.5 million euro plan for hiking and cycling routes in the region.
