= Raydon =

Village in Suffolk, England

Coordinates: 52.007°N 0.986°E

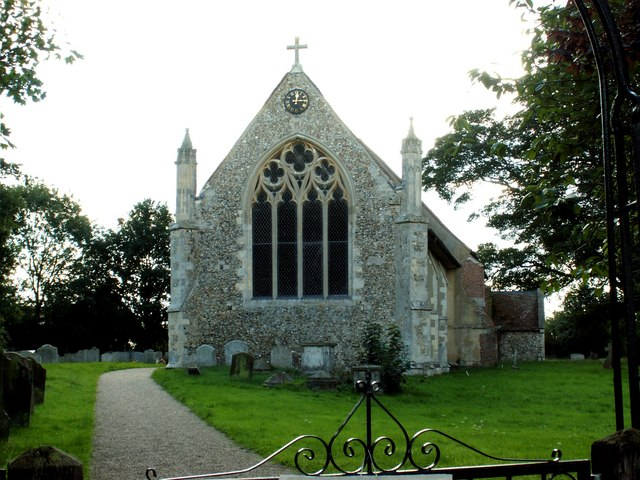
- St. Mary's church, Raydon

- Location within Suffolk
- Population: 507 (2001 and 2011)
- OS grid reference: TM0438
- District: Babergh
- Shire county: Suffolk
- Region: East
- Country: England
- Sovereign state: United Kingdom
- Post town: IPSWICH
- Postcode district: IP7
- Dialling code: 01473

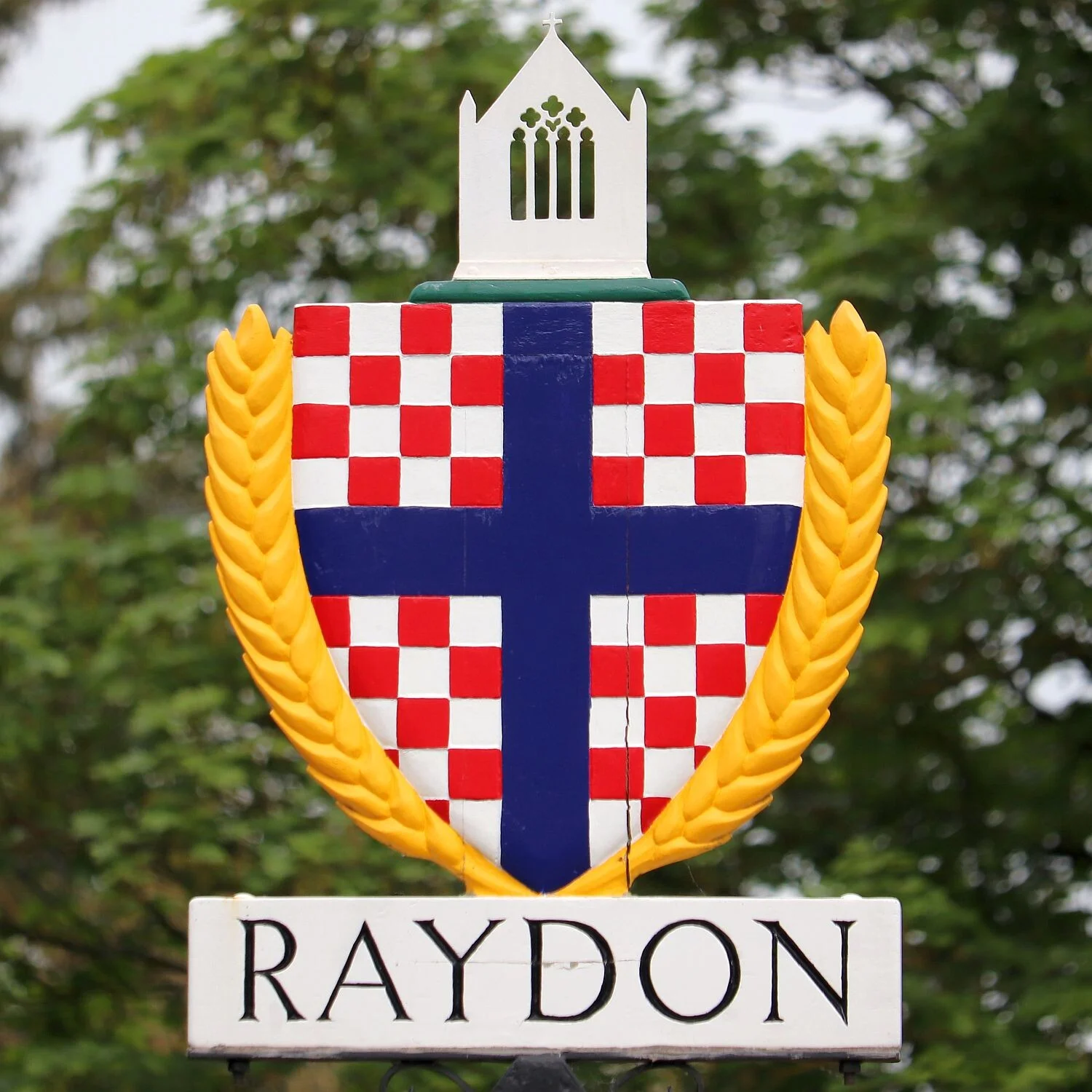
Raydon Village Sign

Raydon is a village and civil parish in Suffolk, England. Located around two miles south-east of Hadleigh, it is part of Babergh district. The parish also includes the hamlets of Lower Raydon (west) and The Woodlands (east). It was recorded in Domesday as "Reindune" or "Reinduna" and appears on John Speed's 1610 map as "Roydon".

Raydon is based along part of the B1070 named The Street (runs north–south) and St Mary's church is close to the T junction with Woodlands Road in the north of the village.

Raydon Mill dates from some time after the Mediaeval period located over a mile west of the village above Lower Raydon. It held some German POWs during the war. It's now residential, but the turbine and two pairs of stones remain.

The south and west of the parish, including Lower Raydon, is part of the Dedham Vale AONB. The northern part of the parish contains several nature reserves; Raydon Great Wood, Long Wood, Squares Grove and Tom's Wood, all of which are ancient woodland. The abandoned Hadleigh Railway previously ran through the Great Wood, with a station at Raydon Wood. The line is now also a nature reserve.

Brett Vale Golf Club is located to the west of the village.

Raydon Hall Farm is 1 km northeast from the village and the War Memorial is 1 km further on off Woodlands Road. During World War II an airfield was built in this area, which was initially known as United States Army Air Forces (USAAF) Station 157, later becoming RAF Raydon. Construction began when American engineers from the 833rd and 862nd battalions arrived in summer 1942. Airfield personnel lived close to Great Wenham. The remaining buildings from the airfield are today part of Notley Enterprise Park. Raydon Hall (TM0529039055) in this area is a Grade II building.

Two pubs in the village have closed for many years, Chequers (formerly Horseshoes) and the Fox.
