= Capel railway station =

Disused railway station in England

Coordinates: 52.00838°N 1.06177°E

Capel
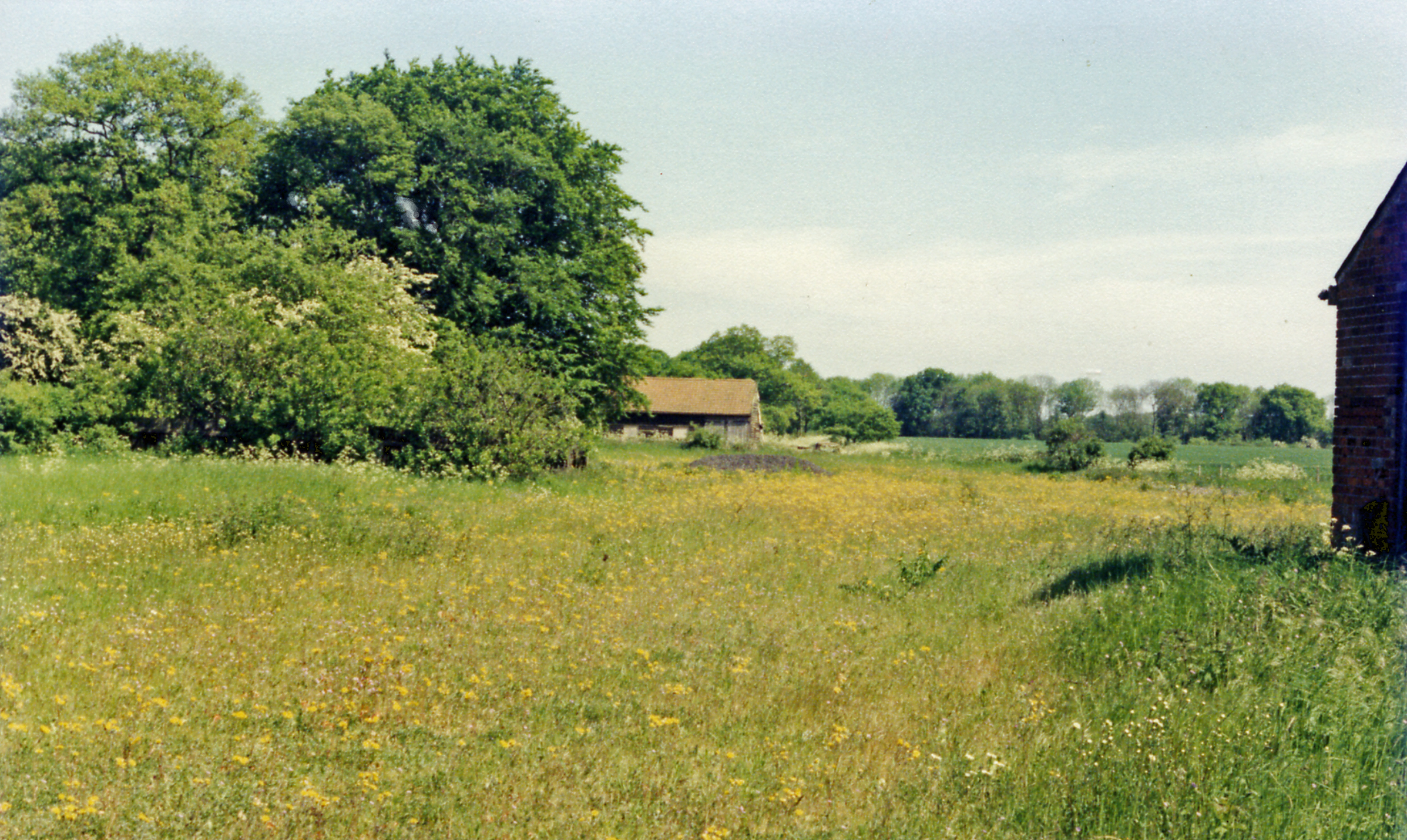
- Site of the station in 1985

General information
- Location: Capel St Mary, Babergh; England
- Platforms: 1

Other information
- Status: Disused

History
- Original company: Eastern Union and Hadleigh Junction Railway
- Pre-grouping: Great Eastern Railway
- Post-grouping: London and North Eastern Railway

Key dates
- 2 Sep 1847: Opened
- 29 Feb 1932: Closed to passengers
- 13 July 1964: Closed for freight
Location

Capel railway station was a station in Capel St Mary, Suffolk, on a short branch line from Bentley Junction to Hadleigh. The station buildings were remarkably ornate for a village with a population of 649 in 1851 and 504 in 1931. There were goods sidings on the northern side of the station, which were used extensively in World War II handling supplies to a nearby United States Army Air Forces base, later known as RAF Raydon.

Former Services

Preceding station	Disused railways	Following station
Raydon Wood; Line and station closed	Great Eastern Railway; Eastern Union and Hadleigh Junction Railway	Bentley Church; Line and station closed

The line opened in 1847 and closed to passenger traffic in 1932 and for freight services in 1964 a year before closure of the line. As the railway line through the station crossed the A12 road at a level-crossing, when the road was widened in the early 1970s the station was demolished. Capel Station Garage and car repairs workshop now occupies part of the site.
