= Railway Walk, Hadleigh =

Nature reserve in Suffolk, England

Coordinates: 52.03°N 0.98°E

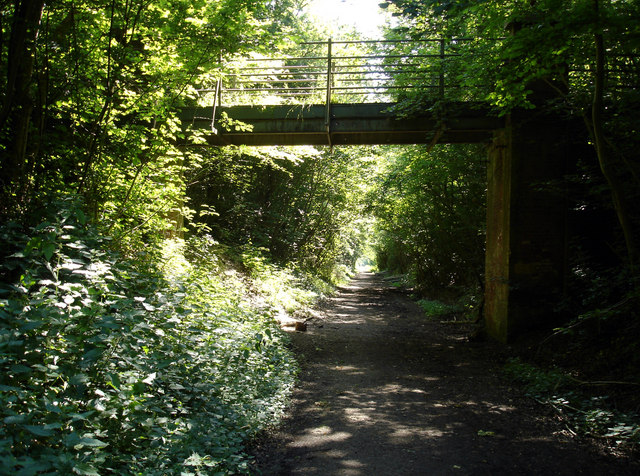
- Interactive map of Railway Walk, Hadleigh
- Type: Local Nature Reserve
- Location: Hadleigh, Suffolk
- OS grid: TM 045 410
- Area: 11.6 hectares (29 acres)
- Manager: Babergh District Council

Railway Walk, Hadleigh is an 11.6 hectare Local Nature Reserve which runs for 2 miles along the route of the former Hadleigh railway south-east from Hadleigh in Suffolk. It is owned and managed by Babergh District Council.

The walk starts at the original station building in Hadleigh, which is now a private house. The route runs along a relatively level path, some of it on embankment and some in cutting. Most of it is bordered by trees. The path ends at the former Raydon Wood station, the trackbed south from that point not being open to the public. There is parking for about 5 or 6 cars at Raydon Wood, making it possible to walk from there to Hadleigh and return, a 4-mile round trip.

== Picture gallery ==
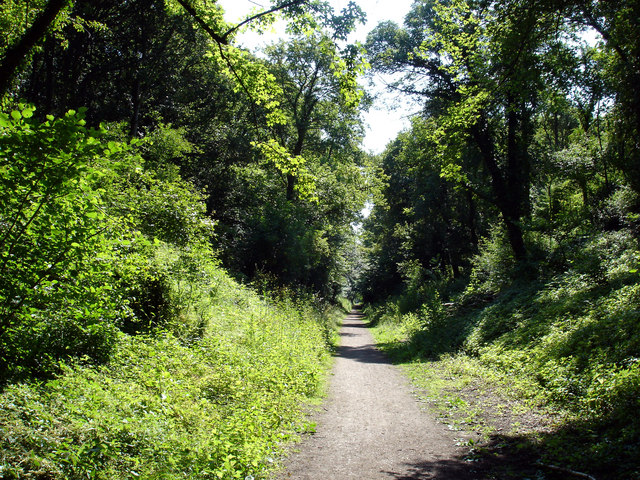

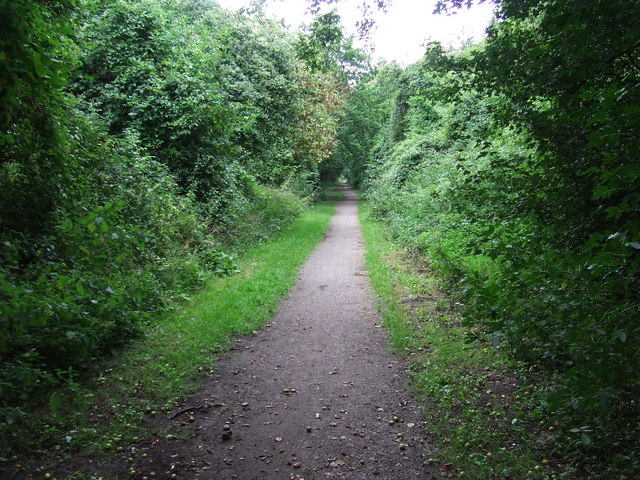

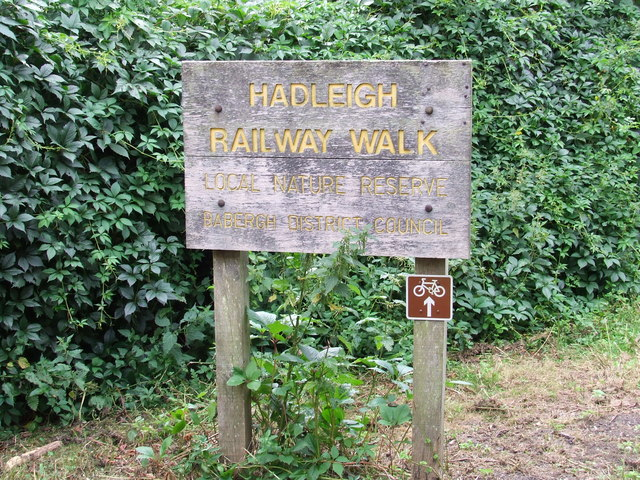

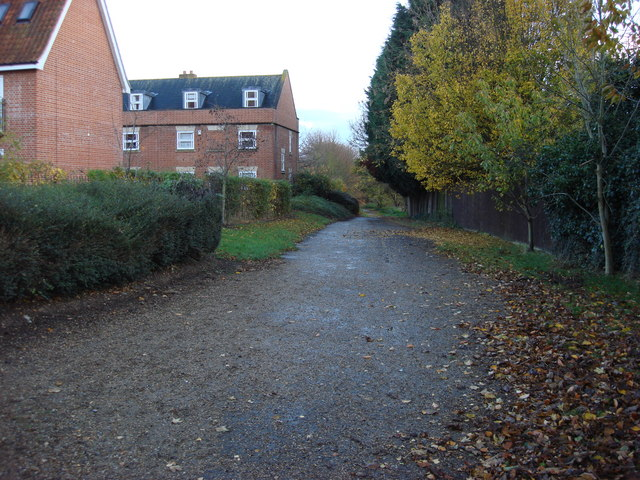
