= Hostašovice =

- Municipality
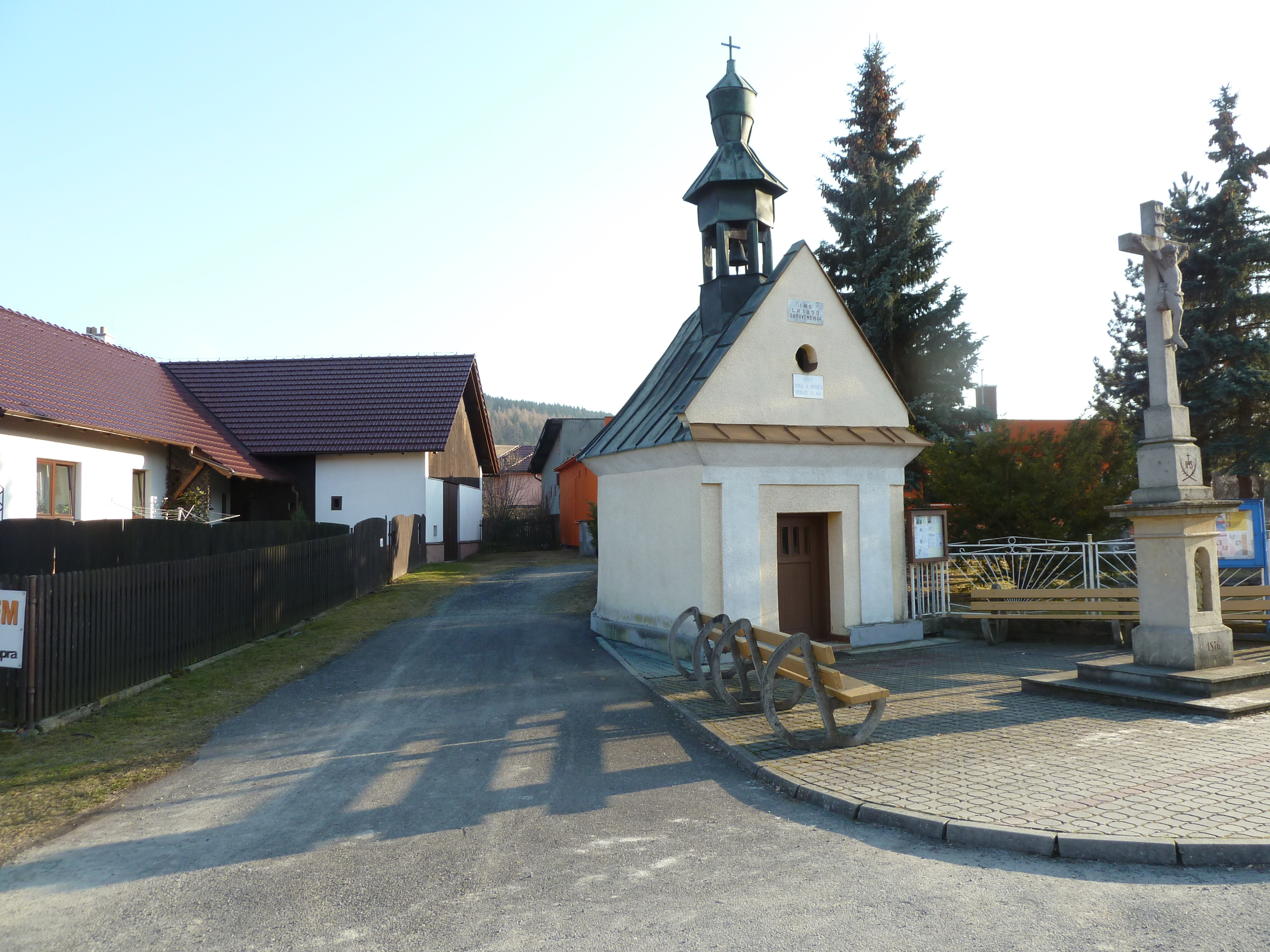
- Chapel of Saints Cyril and Methodius

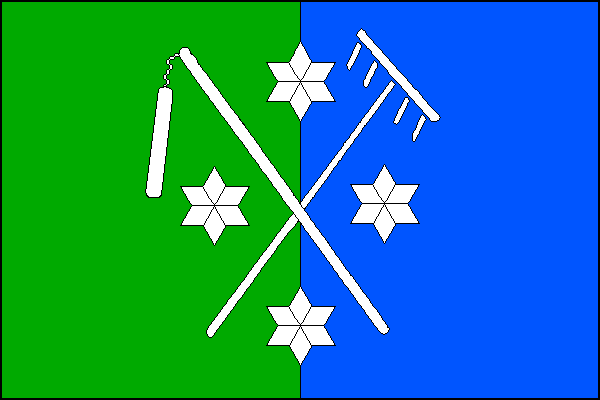
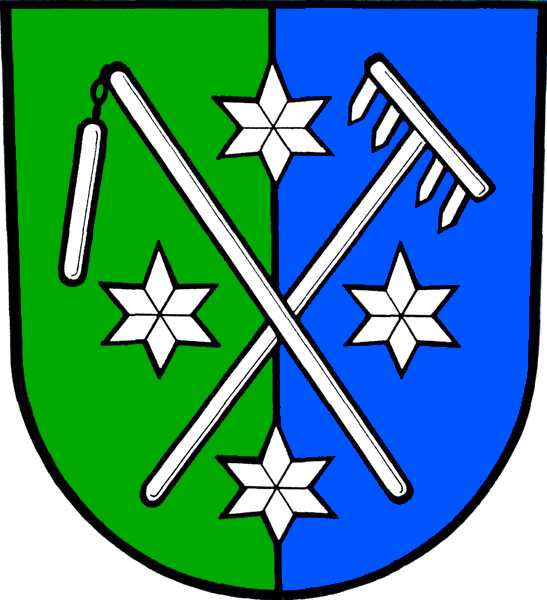
- Flag Coat of arms

- Location in the Czech Republic
- Coordinates: 49°32′3″N 17°59′50″E
- Country: Czech Republic
- Region: Moravian-Silesian
- District: Nový Jičín
- First mentioned: 1464

Area
  - Total: 9.27 km^{2} (3.58 sq mi)
- Elevation: 360 m (1,180 ft)

Population (2026-01-01)
  - Total: 807
  - Density: 87.1/km^{2} (225/sq mi)
- Time zone: UTC+1 (CET)
  - Summer (DST): UTC+2 (CEST)
- Postal code: 741 01
- Website: www.hostasovice.cz

Hostašovice is a municipality and village in Nový Jičín District in the Moravian-Silesian Region of the Czech Republic. It has about 800 inhabitants.

== Geography ==
Hostašovice is located about 7 kilometres (4 mi) south of Nový Jičín and 34 km (21 mi) southwest of Ostrava. It lies mostly in the Moravian-Silesian Foothills, only the southern part of the municipal territory extends into the Moravian-Silesian Beskids (into the Beskydy Protected Landscape Area). The highest point is the hill Oprchlice at 638 m (2,093 ft) above sea level.

In the territory of Hostašovice is a nature monument called Prameny Zrzávky ('Zrzávka springs'). It has an area of 0.45 ha (1.1 acres). It features two geomorphologically valuable separate locations with water springs containing ferric sulfate and hydrogen sulfide.

== History ==
The first written mention of Hostašovice is from 1464. According to local legend, the village was founded around 1249 by a bird catcher named Hostaša. In 1749, it was formally recognized as an independent municipality with its own seal. From 1978 to 1990, it was a municipal part of Nový Jičín.

== Demographics ==
Historical population

Year	Pop.	±%
1869	466	—
1880	484	+3.9%
1890	556	+14.9%
1900	559	+0.5%
1910	569	+1.8%

Year	Pop.	±%
1921	570	+0.2%
1930	750	+31.6%
1950	668	−10.9%
1961	803	+20.2%
1970	759	−5.5%

Year	Pop.	±%
1980	699	−7.9%
1991	661	−5.4%
2001	688	+4.1%
2011	755	+9.7%
2021	765	+1.3%

Source: Censuses

== Economy ==
Since the late 18th century, Hostašovice has been known for cultivating and processing buckwheat.

== Transport ==
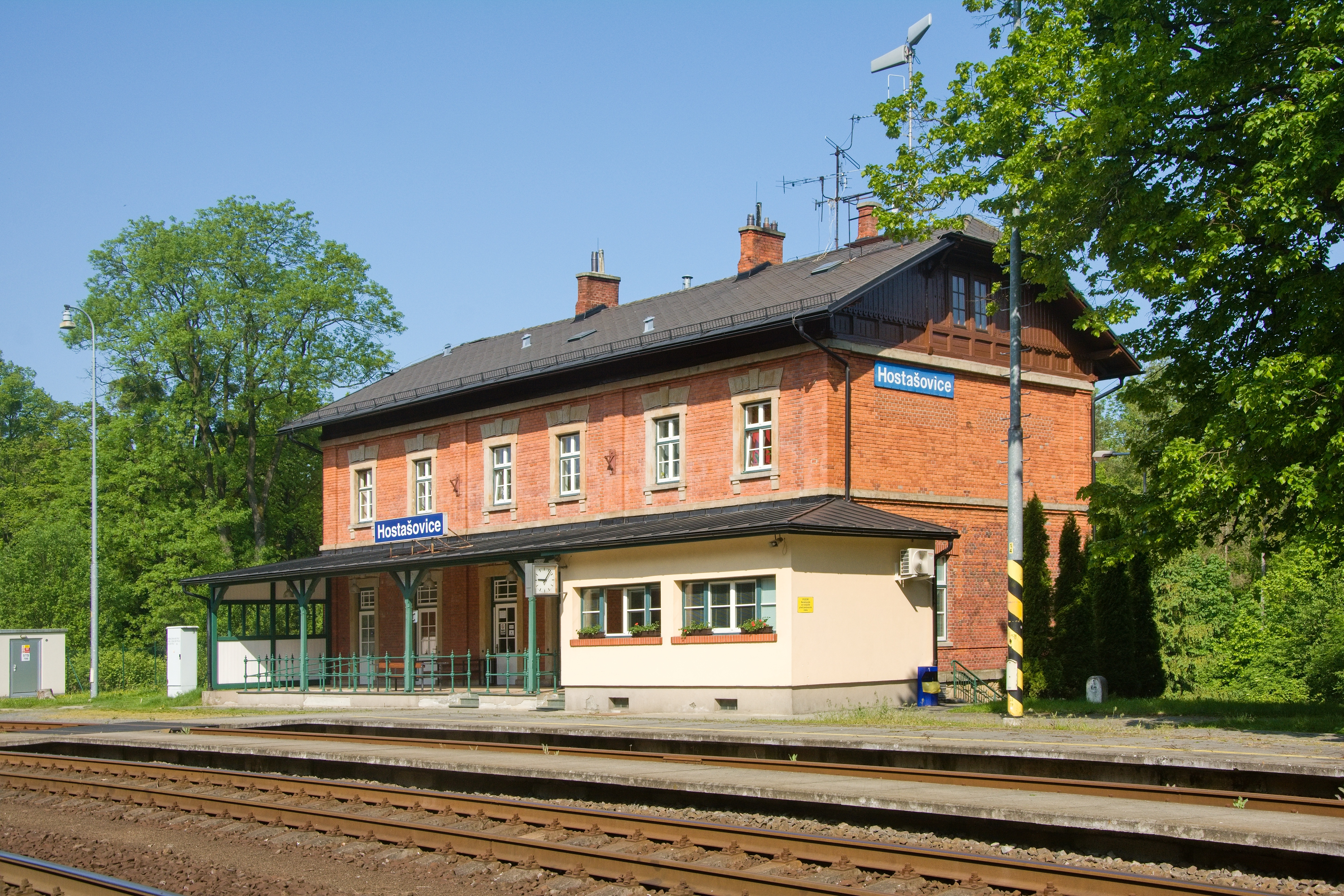
Train station

The I/57 road (the section from Nový Jičín to Vsetín) runs through the municipality.

Hostašovice is located on the railway line Valašské Meziříčí–Frýdlant nad Ostravicí. The train station is situated outside the built-up area.

== Sights ==
There are no protected cultural monuments in the municipality. The main landmark of Hostašovice is the Chapel of Saints Cyril and Methodius, built in 1850.
