= Hadleigh Railway =

Railway line in Suffolk, England

The Hadleigh Railway was a 7 1/2-mile (12.1 km) long single track branch railway line in Suffolk, England, that connected Hadleigh to the main line railway network at Bentley Junction. It was built by the nominally independent Eastern Union and Hadleigh Junction Railway company and opened in 1847. By the time of opening it had been taken over by the larger Eastern Union Railway.

It was never successful commercially, nor in reviving the fortunes of Hadleigh itself, and passenger services were withdrawn in 1932, followed by total closure in 1965.

The northernmost two mile stretch of the trackbed, from the station site in Hadleigh to the site of Raydon Wood Station, now forms the Hadleigh Railway Walk.

== Unfulfilled schemes ==
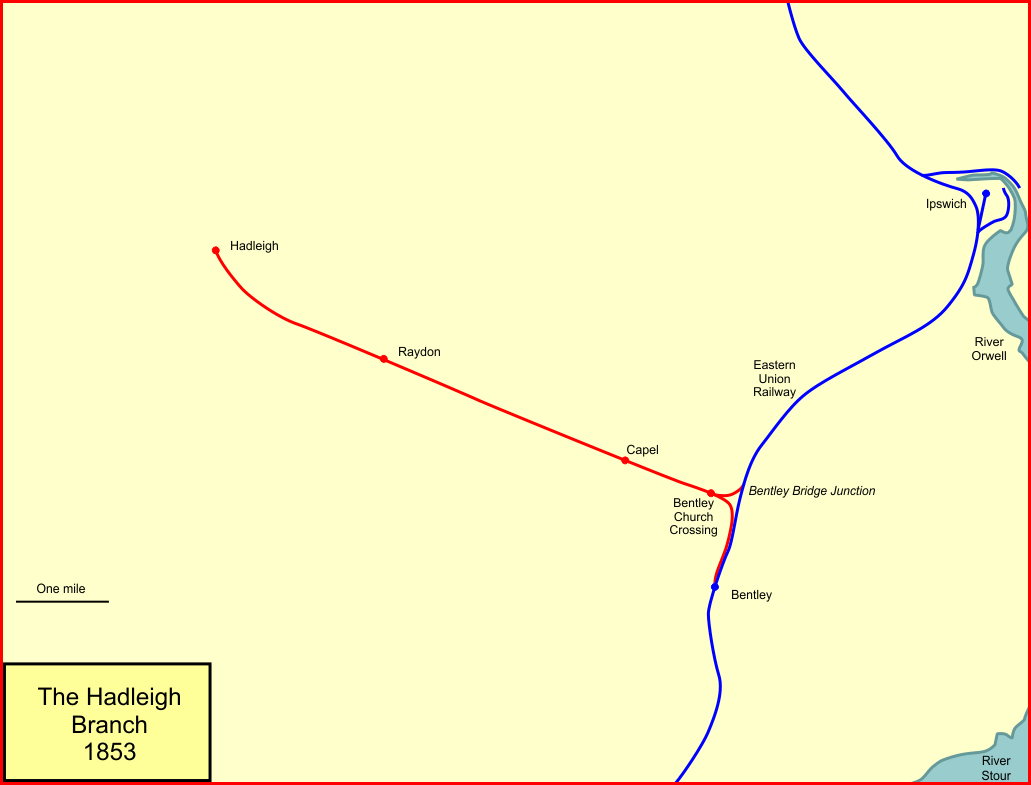
The Hadleigh branch in 1853

At the time of the earliest railways, the town of Hadleigh was an important centre of the wool and clothing industry. The Eastern Counties Railway was incorporated in 1836 to build a railway from London to Yarmouth; the capital was £1.6 million. This was a prodigious project, and in fact the actual cost greatly overran, so that all the money was spent and the railway only reached Colchester.

When the ECR reappraised its plans, it proposed to build from Colchester to Bury St Edmunds through Hadleigh, putting Ipswich on a branch from the town, but this scheme came to nothing.

Local interests were dismayed that their railway connections was to be denied to them, and in 1844 the Eastern Union Railway was incorporated, to build from Ipswich to Colchester, possibly to include Norwich in its network. However this line was not to connect Hadleigh, and by 1844 merchants in the town had seen the adverse effect on formerly prosperous towns that were by-passed by main lines.

Local people promoted a branch line scheme to connect Hadleigh with Bentley station on the Eastern Union Railway main line, seven miles away. There was intense competition between the Eastern Union Railway and the rival Eastern Counties Railway: the object was to capture as much territory as possible. From the EUR point of view, the Hadleigh branch would cut off the possible advance of the ECR. Accordingly the EUR supported the local scheme, which was nevertheless promoted in Parliament as an independent project.

== Authorisation and construction ==
Eastern Union and Hadleigh Junction Railway Act 1846
- Act of Parliament
- Parliament of the United Kingdom
- Long title: An Act for making a Railway from the Eastern Union Railway in the Parish of Bentley to the Town of Hadleigh, all in the County of Suffolk, to be called "The Eastern Union and Hadleigh Junction Railway."
- Citation: 9 & 10 Vict. c. liii

Dates
- Royal assent: 18 June 1846

Other legislation
- Repealed by: Great Eastern Railway Act 1862

Status: Repealed

The Eastern Union and Hadleigh Junction Railway was incorporated by the Eastern Union and Hadleigh Junction Railway Act 1846 (9 & 10 Vict. c. liii) of 18 June 1846; the share capital was to be £75,000. The Eastern Union Railway had opened its main line for goods traffic on 1 June 1846, and passenger operation started on 15 June 1846. The EUR wasted no time in indicating a wish to bring the EU&HJR company into its own control, and the EU&HJR was amenable. When the contract for construction was to be let, the EUR Board were invited to ratify it. The contractor selected was George Wythes.

Nevertheless the EU&HJR directors now considered that an extension of their line to Lavenham, an important town in the wool industry, was desirable, and they put in hand the necessary measures to secure parliamentary authorisation for that. In fact the EUR was, at the same time, encouraging the Colchester, Stour Valley, Sudbury and Halstead Railway, which had just received its authorising act of Parliament, the Colchester, Stour Valley, Sudbury and Halstead Railway Act 1846 (9 & 10 Vict. c. lxxvi).The Lavenham extension would conflict with the strategic objectives of the EUR, and they asked the EU&HJR to defer their proposal. At first the local company declined to do so, but they were later persuaded to relent.

Eastern Union and Hadleigh Junction Railway Sale Act 1847
- Act of Parliament
- Parliament of the United Kingdom
- Long title: An Act for authorizing the Sale of the Eastern Union and Hadleigh Junction Railway to the Eastern Union Railway Company.
- Citation: 10 & 11 Vict. c. xix

Dates
- Royal assent: 8 June 1847

The act authorising amalgamation of the EU&HJR with the EUR, the Eastern Union and Hadleigh Junction Railway Sale Act 1847 (10 & 11 Vict. c. xix), was passed in the following session of Parliament, on 8 June 1847.

== Opening ==
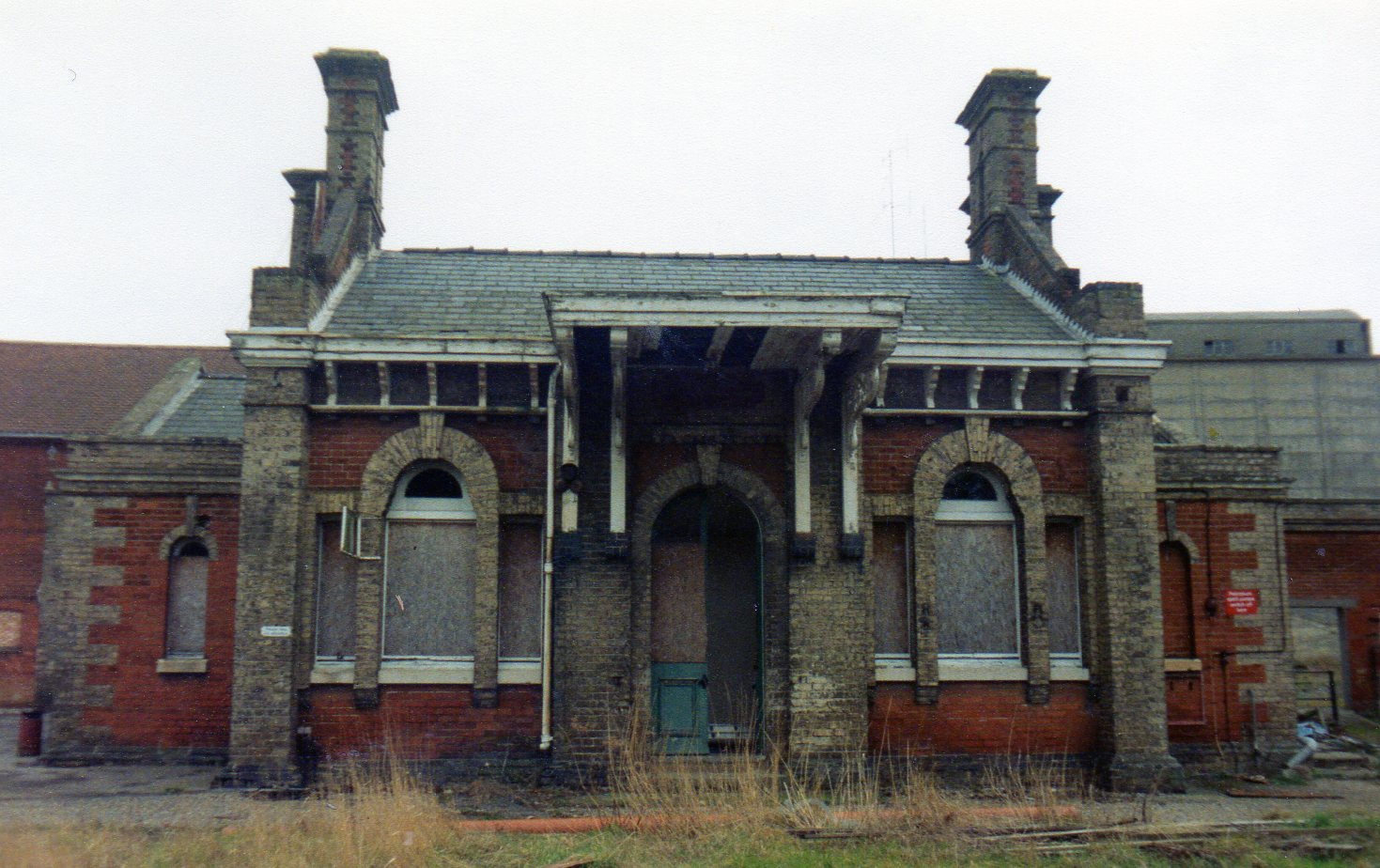
Hadleigh railway station

Confident in the timely completion of the line, the directors arranged a ceremonial opening of the Hadleigh line on 20 August 1847, and the following day the line opened to goods traffic. The Board of Trade inspection, essential for passenger operation, had not taken place, and the line could not yet be opened to passengers. Captain J. L. A. Simmons conducted the inspection on 30 August 1847. Simmons report noted that the junction at Bentley was a triangle so that trains from Ipswich could run direct to the branch. Simmons was satisfied and the line opened fully on 2 September 1847.

Five trains ran each way every weekday, with three each way on Sundays, although the Sunday service was withdrawn before long. The profitability of the line was immediately disappointing.

In 1848 two direct services to Ipswich were included in the schedule each weekday, but the northern section of the triangular junction to the main line was closed in 1875. From that time, any services to Ipswich reversed at Bentley. Some through coaches to London were run. In 1875 and 1876 in the return direction they were slipped at Bentley and attached to a local train.

== Great Eastern Railway ==
The Great Eastern Railway was formed in 1862 by the amalgamation of the Eastern Union Railway, the Eastern Counties Railway and others. The effective date was July 1862.

In 1889 there were five passenger trains each way per day on the line, with some working through to Manningtree. Passenger services on the line peaked in 1920 when the number daily had reached seven, but competition from bus services reduced this to five by 1924, which was the level maintained until passenger service was withdrawn.

While little changed in the pattern of working on the branch, passenger and goods usage gradually declined in the twentieth century. The conductor-guard system was introduced in the spring of 1922 in an attempt to reduce costs of passenger train working.

== From 1923 ==
The Railways Act 1921 required most of the railways of Great Britain to be placed under the ownership of one or other of four new large concerns, in a process known as the "grouping". The Great Eastern Railway was a constituent of the new London and North Eastern Railway (LNER); the transfer is considered to have taken effect from the beginning of 1923.

The poor carryings on the line were not overlooked by the LNER, and it was announced that the passenger service on the line would be discontinued after the last train on 27 February 1932; the line was closed to passengers from 29 February 1932. The goods service continued for the time being.

Despite the branch line's closure to passengers, private rail tours continued to operate on the goods line. The East Suffolk Rail Tour took place on 15 September 1962 between London Liverpool Street and Felixstowe, stopping at Bentley and Hadleigh on its journey.

== World War II ==
The goods facilities at Capel and Raydon Wood were used extensively during World War II, handling supplies for a nearby United States Army Air Forces base. The location was later known as RAF Raydon.

=== Closure ===
In peacetime, the goods service on the line once again declined, and was withdrawn after the last clearance of outward traffic on Maundy Thursday, 15 April 1965, closure being considered to have taken place on 19 April 1965. The track was removed later that year. Bentley station lost its passenger service on 7 November 1966.

== Topography ==
Station list

- Bentley (station on main line): opened 15 June 1846; closed 7 November 1966.
- Bentley Church (often called Bentley Church Crossing): open from October 1853 to December 1853. Quick speculates that it was intended as an alternative station for Bentley for trains taking the direct spur to Ipswich. According to the timetable, trains stopped for passengers who had tickets for 8 miles and over, i.e. journeys that involved travel over the main line. That ruled out local use to Hadleigh, even though this stop was far closer to the village than Bentley station itself.
- Capel: opened 2 September 1847; closed 29 February 1932.
- Raydon: opened 2 September 1847; renamed Raydon Wood 1895; closed 29 February 1932.
- Hadleigh: opened 2 September 1847; closed 29 February 1932.
