= Hillend Loch Railway Path =

Rail trail in Scotland

The Hillend Loch Railway Path, also known as the Airdrie to Bathgate Railway Path, is a rail trail located in central Scotland. The path is approximately 14 miles (23 km) long and follows the route of the former Bathgate and Coatbridge Railway between Airdrie, North Lanarkshire (55.8662°N 3.9539°W), and Bathgate, West Lothian (55.8918°N 3.6224°W).

It formed part of National Cycle Route 75 which runs from Clyde to Forth. It is also known as Airdrie to Bathgate Railway Path.

The railway reopened in 2010 and the path was relocated to run alongside the railway line.

== See also ==
- Bathgate and Coatbridge Railway
- Airdrie–Bathgate rail link
- Bathgate
- National Cycle Network
- List of rail trails
