= Raydon Wood railway station =

Former railway station in England

Coordinates: 52.0238°N 1.0021°E

Great Raydon Wood
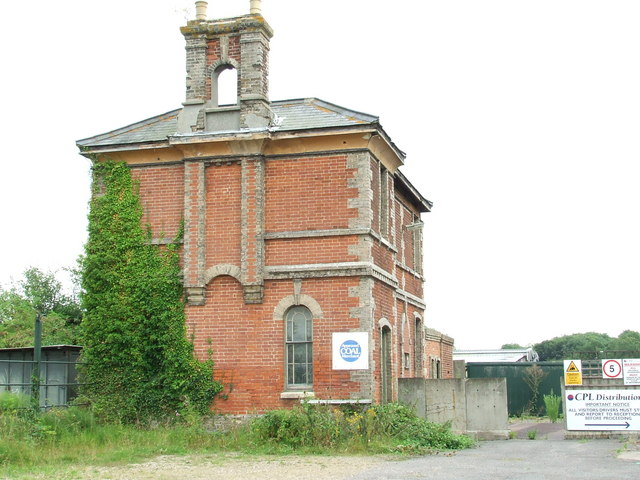
- The station building. The railway ran to the left of the building as seen in this view where the short platform is still extant.

General information
- Location: Raydon, Babergh; England
- Platforms: 1

Other information
- Status: Disused

History
- Original company: Eastern Union & Hadleigh Junction Railway
- Pre-grouping: Great Eastern Railway
- Post-grouping: London and North Eastern Railway

Key dates
- 2 Sep 1847: Opened as Raydon
- 1 Oct 1895: Renamed Raydon Wood
- 29 Feb 1932: Closed for passengers
- 19 April 1965: closed for freight
Location

Raydon Wood railway station was a station in Suffolk, on a short branch line from Bentley Junction to Hadleigh. There was a goods shed on a passing loop which included a small siding on the south side of the station at the Bentley end.

Together with Capel it was extensively used for handling supplies in World War II for a nearby United States Army Air Forces base, later known as RAF Raydon.

Preceding station	Disused railways	Following station
Hadleigh; Line and station closed	Great Eastern Railway; Hadleigh Railway	Capel; Line and station closed

The line opened in 1847 and closed to passenger traffic in 1932, with freight services lingering on until 1965.

The station building still stands, in disrepair and unused next to CPL Distribution, a coal merchant's depot. It is unknown who owns the Station Building but it is boarded up and not part of CPL Distribution
