= Eckington and Renishaw railway station =

Former railway station in Derbyshire, England

Coordinates: 53°17′58.7″N 1°20′15.9″W

Eckington and Renishaw

General information
- Location: Eckington, District of North East Derbyshire; England
- Grid reference: SK 442 786
- Platforms: 2

Other information
- Status: Disused

History
- Original company: Midland Railway
- Pre-grouping: Midland Railway
- Post-grouping: London, Midland and Scottish Railway

Key dates
- 11 May 1840: Station opened as "Eckington"
- 13 September 1874: New station
- 10 April 1886: Renamed Eckington and Renishaw
- 1 October 1951: Closed
Location

Eckington and Renishaw railway station is a former railway station between Eckington and Renishaw in Derbyshire, England.

== See also ==
Three stations have at some time included "Eckington" in their names:

- Eckington on the Midland Railway route between Birmingham New Street and Bristol Temple Meads
- Renishaw Central on the Great Central Main Line between Sheffield Victoria and Nottingham Victoria, and
- Eckington and Renishaw which is the subject of this article.

== History ==
The station was opened by the North Midland Railway on their "Old Road" between Chesterfield and Rotherham Masborough.

The original station was of an ornate Italianate design by Francis Thompson and was replaced by a new one fourteen chains further north in 1874.

It was renamed by the Midland Railway as Eckington and Renishaw in 1886 since it was near to the Renishaw Iron Company's works and there was another "Eckington" station on the Birmingham and Gloucester Railway which the Midland had acquired.

The Manchester, Sheffield and Lincolnshire Railway (later the Great Central Railway) subsequently opened a station on 1 June 1892 within sight of the Midland's "Eckington and Renishaw" and called their station "Eckington and Renishaw". The ex-Great Central station was renamed Renishaw Central by British Railways on 25 September 1950.

The street level booking office was built on a bridge over the line with covered stairways leading down to the two platforms.

The station closed completely in 1951. The line is now part of the current Midland Main Line. It is used predominantly for freight, with a handful of passenger trains going the "long way round" from Chesterfield to Sheffield via the Old Road and Darnall largely to retain staff route knowledge in case of diversions.

== Passenger services ==
In 1922 passenger services calling at Eckington and Renishaw were at their most intensive, with trains serving three destinations via three overlapping routes:

- On Sundays only
  - stopping trains plied directly between Rotherham Masborough and Chesterfield (MR) via the Old Road.
- On Mondays to Saturdays three stopping services plied between Sheffield (MR) and Chesterfield
  - most ran direct down the "New Road" through Dronfield and went nowhere near Eckington and Renishaw.
- the other two services went the "long way round" via the "Old Road". They set off north eastwards from Sheffield (MR) towards Rotherham then swung east to go south along the Old Road
  - one of these continued past Holmes, a short distance before Masboro' then swung hard right, next stop Treeton, then all stations, including Eckington and Renishaw, to Chesterfield,
  - the other continued past Attercliffe Road then swung right onto the Sheffield District Railway passing through or calling at West Tinsley and Catcliffe before Treeton, after which they called at all stations to Chesterfield.

== Proposed reopening ==
In 2024, a previously approved plan to reopen the station as part of the Barrow Hill line was put on hold, following a government spending review. These plans were revived in 2025 under the South Yorkshire People's Network project, with Eckington expected to be a calling point on a tram-train extension of the South Yorkshire Supertram network between Sheffield and Chesterfield via Barrow Hill.

Preceding station	Disused railways	Following station
Killamarsh West; Line open, station closed	Midland Railway; North Midland Railway "Old Road"	Barrow Hill; Line open, station closed
