= Barrow Hill railway station =

Former railway station in Derbyshire, England

Barrow Hill
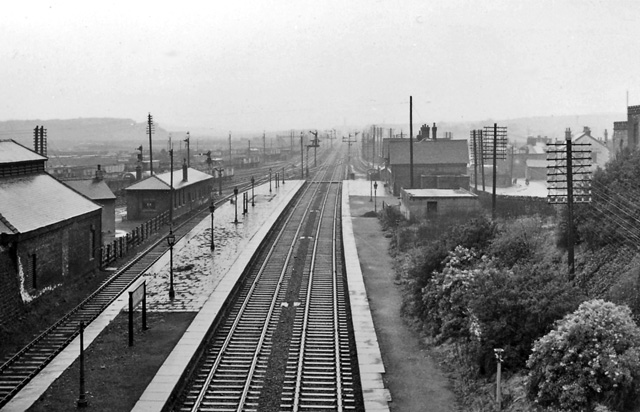

General information
- Location: Staveley, Borough of Chesterfield, England
- Coordinates: 53.2730°N 1.3781°W
- Grid reference: SK 415 752
- Platforms: 3

Other information
- Status: Disused

History
- Original company: North Midland Railway
- Pre-grouping: Midland Railway
- Post-grouping: London, Midland and Scottish Railway, London Midland Region of British Railways

Key dates
- 6 April 1841: Opened as Staveley
- 1 November 1888: Replaced by new station
- 1 June 1900: Renamed Barrow Hill and Staveley Works
- 18 June 1951: Renamed Barrow Hill
- 5 July 1954: Closed for regular passenger services
- After 1981: Closed completely
Location

Barrow Hill railway station served the village of Barrow Hill, in northern Derbyshire, England, between 1841 and 1954.

== History ==
The station was originally opened as Staveley in 1841, a year after the opening of the North Midland Railway. It was designed to serve the village of Staveley and the substantial ironworks near the station.

Allen's guide of 1842 writes of "Staveley upon the hill to the left; Mr. Barrow's iron-works in the valley."

The station on what became known as the "Old Road" between Chesterfield and Rotherham Masborough. It was in an area undergoing rapid industrialisation. Iron working had been carried on for many centuries and Staveley Works itself had been opened in 1702. The land originally had been owned by the Duke of Devonshire, but the copyhold had been bought by Richard Barrow in 1840.

Whites Gazetteer, in 1857, records "Staveley Works, 1 mile E. from Staveley, is an ancient iron smelting establishment; there are documents in existence proving it to have been a place of considerable importance centuries ago, but its early history will not bear any comparison with the vastness of operations in the present day. Here are the collieries and extensive ironworks of Richard Barrow, Esq., with blast furnaces, producing 200 tons of metal weekly. Castings and foundry work of all kinds are executed at this extensive establishment. Neat residences for the clerks and overlookers have been built in the vicinity, besides a great number of cottages."

Local ore had been worked out by 1870, but the works continued to expand, bringing increasing work for the railway. The station was moved and rebuilt in 1888 in a new position when the Clowne Branch was opened.

There were three platforms: two on the main line and one for the branch, with typical Midland buildings, some in brick others of timber.

In 1870, a large locomotive shed was opened, known as Staveley (Barrow Hill) Depot, coded 18D by the LMS and renumbered 41E in 1958. It included a 24 "road" (track) roundhouse. It closed in 1991, but has been preserved and reopened in 1998 as Barrow Hill Roundhouse & Railway Centre.

In 1900, the station was renamed Barrow Hill and Staveley Works. It was renamed again by British Railways in 1951, becoming plain Barrow Hill.

The station closed to regular passenger traffic in 1954, but remained in place for many years. On 26 September 1971, it was used for a shuttle service from Chesterfield in connection with an open day at Barrow Hill engine shed. It remained in use for special services until at least 1981.

== Services ==
In 1922 passenger services calling at Barrow Hill were at their most intensive, with trains serving four destinations via five overlapping routes:

- On Sundays only
  - stopping trains plied directly between Rotherham Masborough and Chesterfield (MR) via the Old Road.
- On Mondays to Saturdays three stopping services plied between Sheffield (MR) and Chesterfield
  - most ran direct down the "New Road" through Dronfield and went nowhere near Barrow Hill.
- the other two services went the "long way round" via the "Old Road". They set off north eastwards from Sheffield (MR) towards Rotherham then swung east to go south along the Old Road
  - one of these continued north past Holmes, a short distance before Masboro' then swung hard right, next stop Treeton, then all stations, including Barrow Hill, to Chesterfield,
  - the other continued past Attercliffe Road then swung right onto the Sheffield District Railway passing through or calling at West Tinsley and Catcliffe before Treeton, after which they called at all stations to Chesterfield.
- Also on Mondays to Saturdays two stopping services plied between Mansfield (MR) and Chesterfield via Barrow Hill
  - some ran via the circuitous Clowne Branch through Elmton and Creswell, Clown (MR) and Staveley Town
  - others ran via the equally circuitous Doe Lea Branch through Glapwell and Staveley Town.

Preceding station	Disused railways	Following station
Whittington; Line open, station closed	Midland Railway "Old Road"	Eckington and Renishaw; Line open, station closed
Whittington; Line open, station closed	Midland Railway "Clowne Branch"	Staveley Town; Line and station closed

== Modern traffic ==
As of 2013, the line is part of the Midland Main Line. It is used predominantly for freight, with a handful of passenger trains going the "long way round" from Chesterfield to Sheffield, via the Old Road and Darnall, largely to retain staff route knowledge in case of diversions.

== Possible future ==
The lines from Barrow Hill and Foxlow Junction to Hall Lane Junction and thence to Seymour Junction and on to the former Markham Colliery have been mothballed as they run to the new Markham Vale Enterprise Zone at M1 junction 29A.

The trackbed of the Clowne Branch from Seymour Junction has been protected too. Furthermore, the trackbed of the Oxcroft Branch off the Clowne Branch east of Seymour Junction has been protected as there remains the possibility of opencasting in the area. For example, in 2005, UK Coal (now Coalfield Resources) expressed an interest in extracting c530,000 tons near Mastin Moor.

In 2024, a previously approved plan to reopen the station was put on hold, following a government spending review. These plans were revived in 2025 under the South Yorkshire People's Network project, with Barrow Hill expected to be a calling point on a tram-train extension of the South Yorkshire Supertram network between Sheffield and Chesterfield.

== See also ==
Four other stations have at some time included "Staveley" in their names:

- Staveley Central on the Great Central Main Line, about two miles east of Barrow Hill
- Staveley Town on the Midland Railway Clowne Branch, about 250 yds east of Staveley Central
- Staveley Works on the "Chesterfield Loop" off the Great Central Main Line, about half a mile south of Barrow Hill
- Staveley on the Windermere Branch Line in Cumbria.
