= Broomhouse Tunnel =

Railway formation in Northern England

Coordinates: 53.2748°N 1.4388°W

Broomhouse Tunnel was on the Midland Main Line between Chesterfield and Sheffield. It was built by the Midland Railway in 1870 on what is known to railwaymen as the "New Road" to Sheffield. This bypassed the North Midland Railway's original line, which came to be known as "Old Road", and which had avoided Sheffield due to the gradients involved.

Broomhouse Tunnel was 92 yards long, through a narrow ridge a mile past Sheepbridge. It was opened out to become a cutting in 1969 when British Rail blew it up with explosives.

The line diverged just north of Chesterfield at Tapton Junction with a steady three and a half mile climb at 1 in 100, through Sheepbridge and Unstone stations, before a short drop to Dronfield. From there, it climbed to the summit before Bradway Tunnel thence to what would become the junction through Dore and Totley and the line to Manchester, continuing to Beauchief.
