= Whittington railway station =

Former railway station in Derbyshire, England

Coordinates: 53°16′14″N 1°23′58″W

Whittington

General information
- Location: Chesterfield; England
- Grid reference: SK 401 750
- Platforms: 2

Other information
- Status: Disused

History
- Original company: Midland Railway
- Post-grouping: London, Midland and Scottish Railway

Key dates
- 1 October 1861: Station opened
- 9 June 1873: Replaced by new station further north
- 4 February 1952: Closed to regular services
- March 1977: Closed completely
Location

Whittington railway station is a former railway station on the southern edge of New Whittington, Derbyshire, England.

== History ==
The original Whittington station was built by the Midland Railway to serve Old Whittington. The station opened on 1 October 1861 with two services per day to Derby, and three to Leeds. The impetus to provide the station at Whittington came from the establishment of extensive steel works and the opening of several collieries at Whittington which increased the population in the area. The initial station comprised wooden buildings with platforms on both lines, and roads were made from the old and new villages for access.

The station was on the North Midland Railway's "Old Road" between Chesterfield and Rotherham Masborough. The line opened in 1840 and became very busy with coal and steel traffic with a number of new branches. In 1870 the Midland opened the "New Road" through Sheffield from Tapton Junction just north of Chesterfield, diverting passenger expresses away from the Old Road.

The line through Whittington remained busy with local passengers, particularly with the rapidly expanding industry. The original station was replaced with a station 1.5 miles (2 km) further north in 1873. This 1873 station was the final Whittington station in the area.

The buildings were constructed of timber, as was the signal box, with loops to each line. For a period around 1938 there was a wagon works nearby, with a small siding.

The station experienced some trouble on 19 August 1911 during the National Railway strike of 1911. A large mob resorted to throwing stones at every train that passed through Whittington. Railway officials learned that it was the intention of the mob to stone the train due to arrive at 10.11 for Chesterfield. The company sent for a detachment of the West Yorkshire Regiment which were at Barrow Hill. The soldiers were brought to Whittington and detrained about 100 yards (91 m) north of the station and proceeded on foot to clear a safe passage for the people in the train following. The mob returned the next day and stoned the station buildings, breaking around half of the windows.

The last regular passenger trains called on 4 February 1952, though it was used for excursions and special trains until 1977.

=== Stationmasters ===
- J. Hey 1861 - 1862
- S. Jervis 1862 - 1864
- H.T. Brown 1864 - 1865
- Charles Fox 1865 - 1870
- Joseph Cowland 1870 - 1880
- George Pooley 1880 - 1886
- John Ross 1886 - 1889
- Aaron Walker 1889 - 1895 (afterwards station master at Sandal and Walton)
- J. Shaw 1895 - 1898
- William Little 1898 - 1909 (formerly station master at Heaton Mersey)
- C.H. Baker ca. 1911
- W. Thompson until 1939
- W. M. Powis from 1939

== Passenger services ==
In 1922 passenger services calling at Whittington were at their most intensive, with trains serving four destinations via five overlapping routes:

- On Sundays only
  - stopping trains plied directly between Rotherham Masborough and Chesterfield (MR) via the Old Road.
- On Mondays to Saturdays three stopping services plied between Sheffield (MR) and Chesterfield
  - most ran direct down the "New Road" through Dronfield and went nowhere near Whittington.
- the other two services went the "long way round" via the "Old Road". They set off north eastwards from Sheffield (MR) towards Rotherham then swung east to go south along the Old Road
  - one of these continued north past Holmes, a short distance before Masboro' then swung hard right, next stop Treeton, then all stations, including Whittington, to Chesterfield,
  - the other continued past Attercliffe Road then swung right onto the Sheffield District Railway passing through or calling at West Tinsley and Catcliffe before Treeton, after which they called at all stations to Chesterfield.
- Also on Mondays to Saturdays two stopping services plied between Mansfield (MR) and Chesterfield via Barrow Hill
  - some ran via the circuitous Clowne Branch through Elmton and Creswell, Clown (MR) and Staveley Town
  - others ran via the equally circuitous Doe Lea Branch through Glapwell and Staveley Town. Some of these terminated at Barrow Hill, but others continued to Chesterfield, calling at Whittington.

== Modern traffic ==
The line is now part of the current Midland Main Line. It is used predominantly for freight, with a handful of passenger trains going the "long way round" from Chesterfield to Sheffield via the Old Road and Darnall largely to retain staff route knowledge in case of diversions.

Preceding station	Disused railways	Following station
Barrow Hill; Line open, station closed	Midland Railway; North Midland Railway "Old Road"	Chesterfield; Line and station open

== Proposed reopening ==
In 2024, a previously approved plan to reopen the station as part of the Barrow Hill line was put on hold, following a government spending review. These plans were revived in 2025 under the South Yorkshire People's Network project, with Whittington expected to be a calling point on a tram-train extension of the South Yorkshire Supertram network between Sheffield and Chesterfield via Barrow Hill.
