= Midland Railway Clowne Branch =

Former railway line in Derbyshire, England

The Clowne Branch is a disused railway line in north eastern Derbyshire, England, which runs from Creswell to Staveley. Historically it ran to Chesterfield. It is now in use as a greenway.

== Construction ==
The Mansfield Lines Act of 8 July 1865 authorised the construction of the branch, along with others in the area which was undergoing rapid industrialisation, especially in the coal and iron industries.

The 5.75 miles (9.25 km) line was built by the Midland Railway from Seymour Junction on their Doe Lea Valley line to Creswell Junction, immediately north of Elmton and Creswell on their Nottingham to Worksop line, now known as the Robin Hood Line. It was physically completed by January 1872, but not opened throughout until 1 June 1875 and then only for freight, the sole traffic up to that point being coal from Barlborough Colliery.

The branch served three collieries – Oxcroft, Barlborough and Southgate – and one station, initially called Clown ("e" was only added to the village and its railway features in the 20th century) but was later renamed twice, becoming Clowne and Barlborough in 1951. The primary purpose of the line was to give access from the east to the booming coal and iron industries in the Staveley area.

The line was steeply graded from both ends to its summit at Clowne. It had no tunnels, but required three substantial cuttings and a 70 feet (21 m) embankment. Further significant work occurred in the late 1960s when it was bridged by the new M1 Motorway.

Between 1896 and 1900 the LD&ECR built their Beighton Branch which both adjoined and crossed the Clowne Branch in Clowne. Relations between the Midland Railway and the new company were good. A connection was laid between the two lines in Clowne, running north west to south east, some distance east of both companies' stations. It was only ever used for freight and closed in 1937.

The line has the Engineer's Line Reference (ELR) BAC3. Codes beginning "BAC3" appear on structures such as bridges which remain Network Rail's responsibility, even though tracks have been lifted.

== Passenger services ==
Passenger services commenced on 1 November 1888, thirteen years after opening and sixteen years after physical completion. Three trains a day plied between Mansfield and Chesterfield, calling at all stations via Elmton and Creswell, Clown, Netherthorpe, Staveley and Whittington. A common thread between these stations is that every one of them was subsequently renamed at least once or, in the case of Whittington, relocated. The time taken for this sinuous 21 miles (34 km) journey was about an hour.

By 1922 five trains a day, Monday to Saturday, plied the route, but this was the high-water mark. By 1952 only one train each way, Monday to Friday, served Clowne and Barlborough, timed to suit schools. That was withdrawn on 5 July 1954. The station's goods facilities closed in July 1960, leaving its sole purpose excursions, such as for football matches, and Summer Saturday holiday traffic, notably from Radford to Blackpool North. That called for the last time on 18 August 1962.

The last steam train to use the line was a non-stop enthusiasts' special on 16 October 1965. This train also traversed the Doe Lea Branch.

== Freight ==
Freight was always the line's primary purpose. Barlborough Colliery ceased production in 1921 and Southgate followed in 1929.

Oxcroft Colliery, at Stanfree, survived until 27 February 1976. After it closed its facilities for loading coal onto trains were retained and developed as the "Oxcroft Disposal Point" for opencasted coal. The site had something of a Red Letter Day on 9 May 1992 when Class 58 locomotive 58 044 was ceremonially named "Oxcroft Opencast".

The site continued in railway use until Spring 2006, latterly to load coal opencasted from Arkwright colliery and brought to Oxcroft by road. This coal came off the short Oxcroft Branch at Oxcroft Colliery Branch Junction and traversed the Clowne branch for less than a mile to Seymour Junction, heading westwards. The track and loading equipment at Oxcroft DP was protected for some time, but by 20 July 2013 the track had been lifted and all structures had been demolished, though no attempt had been made to landscape the site or remove roadways.

Otherwise light engine movements to and from Shirebrook Diesel Depot became the sole regular through traffic, supplemented by occasional freights and power station coal diversions. This continued until the 1990s when an underground fire threatened to undermine the line, compounded by the expensive need to replace the points at Creswell Junction. These points were replaced by plain line, as were those at Oxcroft Colliery Junction. Superb images of the area are available on line but note that, as the aerial view on the site shows, "Oxcroft Colliery No 3" signalbox was near Barlborough Colliery, not Oxcroft Colliery.

At 20 July 2013 the track between Oxcroft and Creswell had been lifted and piles of concrete sleepers had been placed beneath overbridges in Clowne and Woodthorpe Road (between Shuttlewood and Mastin Moor) to deter wheeled access. Structures such as overbridges had clearly been maintained.

== Future use ==
In 2016, the line was purchased from Network Rail by Derbyshire County Council for future development into a greenway for walkers, cyclists and horse riders.

Planning permission was granted in October 2017 for Derbyshire County Council to develop the disused railway to full greenway standard and connect the eastern end into an access point through a development near to Creswell station, while the western end is now connected to the northern part of the Markham Employment Growth Zone (MEGZ) development and onward into Poolsbrook country park. Funding to undertake the physical works is still being sought but as an interim measure local volunteers keep the line passable by walkers and cyclists by regularly clearing overgrowth and picking litter.

The greenway has been officially opened as of 2018 and is open to as far as the former junction between the Clowne and Doe Lea Branch. The section towards Staveley and Bolsover is not accessible and there is no plans to open a greenway through to Bolsover via Staveley.

A condition of the planning application protects the interests of HS2, which has an intention to use the most westerly section of the line as access from the main HS2 line to a maintenance depot proposed at Staveley. It is hoped that an alternative route for the greenway would be constructed if this proposal progresses.

== Other Reading ==
- Midland Railway System Maps (The Distance Diagrams), volume 2 – Leeds to Leicester and branches; Derby to Manchester and branches; Cheshire Lines (1909–1923 ed.). Teignmouth: Peter Kay. 1998. ISBN 1-899890-17-3.
