= Creswell railway station =

Railway station in Derbyshire, England

Coordinates: 53°15′50″N 1°12′59″W

Creswell
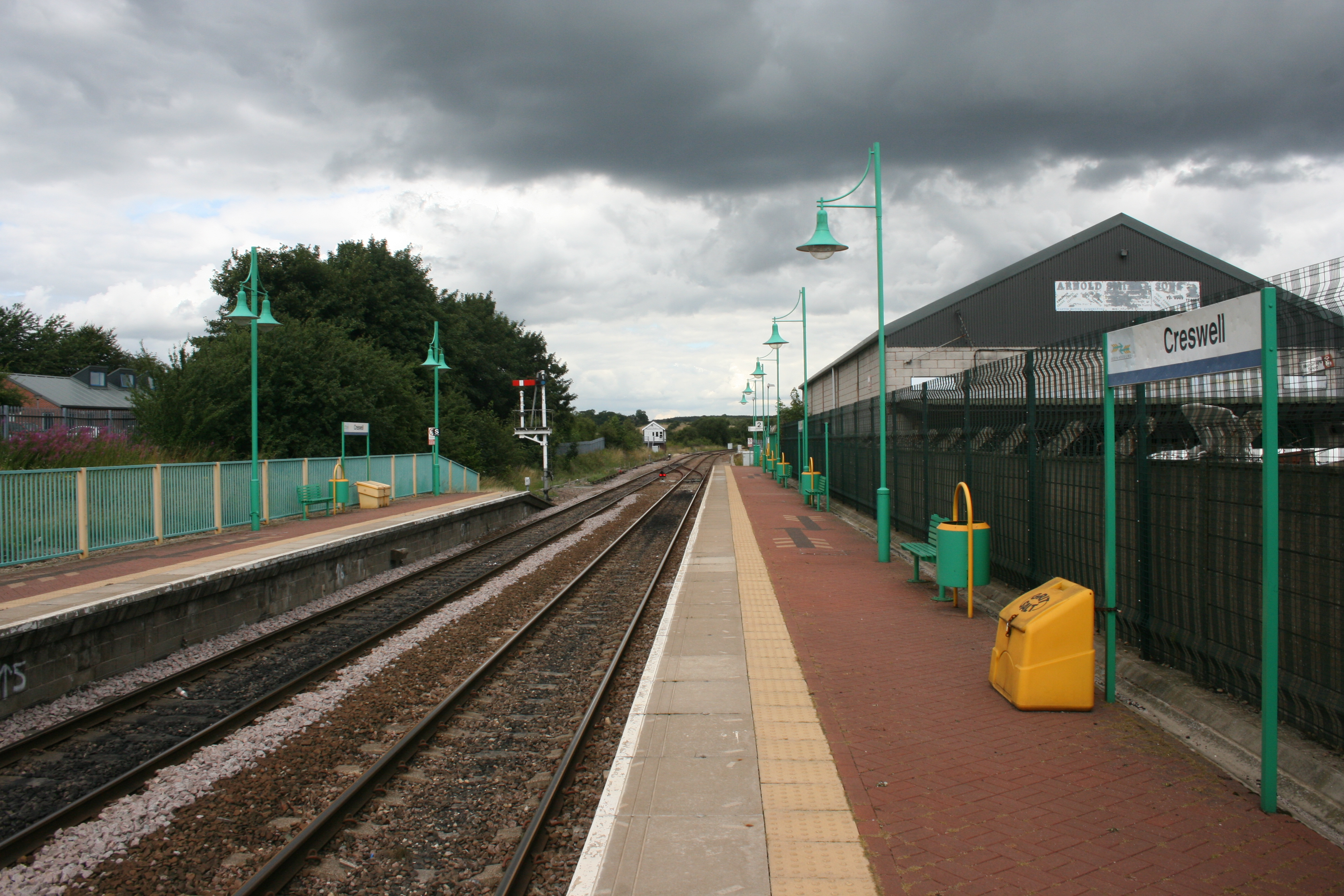

General information
- Location: Creswell, Bolsover; England
- Grid reference: SK523744
- Manager: East Midlands Railway
- Platforms: 2

Other information
- Station code: CWD
- Classification: DfT category F2

History
- Opened: 1 June 1875
- Original company: Midland Railway
- Post-grouping: London, Midland and Scottish Railway

Key dates
- 1 June 1875: Opened
- October 1964: Closed
- 1998: Reopened

Passengers
- 2021/22: ▲30,718
- 2022/23: ▲37,078
- 2023/24: ▲40,532
- 2024/25: ▲40,768
- 2025/26: ▼39,990
Location
Notes
- Passenger statistics from the Office of Rail and Road

Creswell railway station serves the village Creswell in Derbyshire, England. The station is on the Robin Hood Line between Nottingham and Worksop. It is also the nearest station to the larger village of Clowne.

== History ==
The line and the station was built by the Midland Railway. The station was designed by the Midland Railway company architect John Holloway Sanders.

On 24 February 1886 it was renamed as Elmton and Creswell to prevent confusion with the nearby Creswell and Welbeck station opened by the LD&ECR in 1897 and closed at the outbreak of WW2.

== Branch line ==
A branch line veered west immediately north of the station. Its remains are still plainly visible from the north end of the platforms and from Worksop trains. This was the Clowne Branch, which wound a very circuitous route through Clowne, Staveley, Barrow Hill and Whittington to Chesterfield. It closed to normal passenger traffic in 1954, though Summer holiday trains to Blackpool North continued until 1962.

It remained open to freight traffic until the 1980s when the combination of an underground fire and the need to replace tracks led to its closure. The trackbed was formally protected in case a use was found, such as for opencast traffic or for access to the Markham Enterprise Growth Zone at M1 Junction 29A although this never came into fruition and the tracks were removed and the area landscaped to create the Clowne Branch Line Greenway, a shared bike and walking trail starting in Creswell and culminating at Poolsbrook Country Park.

== Services ==
All services at Creswell are operated by East Midlands Railway.

On weekdays and Saturdays, the station is generally served by an hourly service northbound to Worksop and southbound to Nottingham via Mansfield Woodhouse.

There is currently no Sunday service at the station since the previous service of four trains per day was withdrawn in 2011. Sunday services at the station are due to recommence at the station during the life of the East Midlands franchise.

Preceding station	National Rail	Following station
Langwith-Whaley Thorns or Shirebrook	East Midlands Railway: Robin Hood Line; Monday-Saturday only	Whitwell or Worksop
	Disused railways	
Langwith Line open, station closed	Midland Railway Midland Railway Clowne Branch	Clowne and Barlborough Line and station closed
