= Clowne and Barlborough railway station =

Former railway station in Derbyshire, England

Clowne & Barlborough
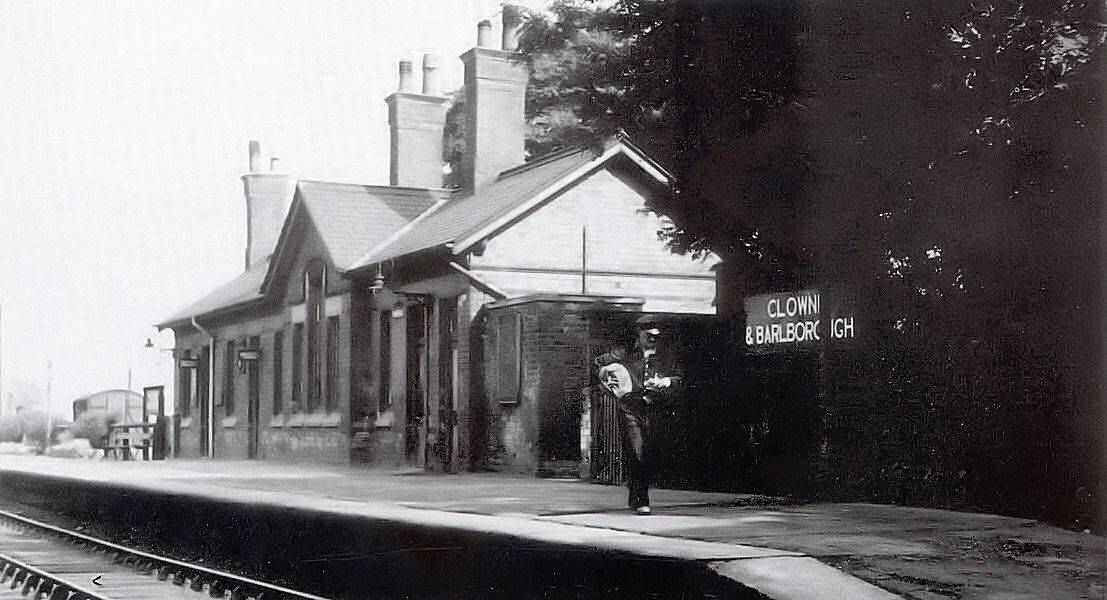
- The station in 1951.

General information
- Location: Clowne, Bolsover; England
- Coordinates: 53°16′35″N 1°15′41″W
- Grid reference: SK 493 757
- Platforms: 1

Other information
- Status: Disused

History
- Original company: Midland Railway
- Pre-grouping: Midland Railway
- Post-grouping: London, Midland and Scottish Railway; British Railways

Key dates
- 1 November 1888: opened as "Clown"
- 4 July 1938: renamed "Clown and Barlborough"
- 18 June 1951: renamed "Clowne and Barlborough"
- 5 July 1954: Timetabled passenger service withdrawn
- July 1960: Goods service withdrawn
- 11 August 1962: Final Summer Blackpool service ended
Location

Clowne & Barlborough is a former railway station in Clowne northeast of Chesterfield, Derbyshire, England.

== Context ==
The station was built by the Midland Railway at the summit of the circuitous Barrow Hill to Elmton and Creswell line known as the Clowne Branch.

== History ==
The station was opened without ceremony on 1 November 1888 as "Clown". All passenger trains called at all stations between Mansfield and Chesterfield.

The line was single track between Seymour Junction and Elmton and Creswell. Accordingly, the station had a single, curving platform and typical Midland Railway country station building very similar to those at Bolsover Castle and Glapwell. Remarkably, the station survived into the 21st Century, being demolished in 2000.

On 4 July 1938 the station was renamed "Clown and Barlborough", then renamed again by British Railways (BR) on 18 June 1951, this time by adding a "e" to become "Clowne and Barlborough." BR went to this trouble to seek to distinguish the station from its neighbour, a mere 30 yards (27 m) to the south, the ex-LD&ECR station which it renamed Clowne South.

== Passenger services ==
Passenger services commenced on 1 November 1888. Initially the service of three trains each way, with a market day extra on Wednesdays and a Saturday evening extra, eastbound only. No service was ever provided on Sundays. All these trains plied between Mansfield and Chesterfield, calling at all stations to Elmton and Creswell, then Clown, Netherthorpe, Staveley and Whittington. A common thread between these stations is that every one of them was subsequently renamed at least once or, in the case of Whittington, relocated. The time taken for this sinuous 21 miles (34 km) journey was about an hour.

By 1922 five trains a day, Monday to Saturday, plied the route, but this was the high-water mark. By 1952 only one train each way, Monday to Friday, served Clowne and Barlborough, timed to suit schools. It ran eastwards from Chesterfield in the morning as far as Elmton and Creswell, but was extended, unadvertised, to Shirebrook West during term time. This was reversed in the afternoons, starting unadvertised from Shirebrook West during term time, and from Elmton and Creswell on the public timetable. That service was withdrawn on 5 July 1954; the last train was operated, remarkably, by a brand new DMU.

The station's goods facilities closed in July 1960, leaving its sole purpose excursions, such as for football matches, and Summer Saturday holiday traffic, notably from Radford to Blackpool North. That called for the last time northbound on 11 August 1962, returning southbound the following Saturday.

The last steam train to use the line was a non-stop enthusiasts' special on 16 October 1965. This train also traversed the Doe Lea Branch.

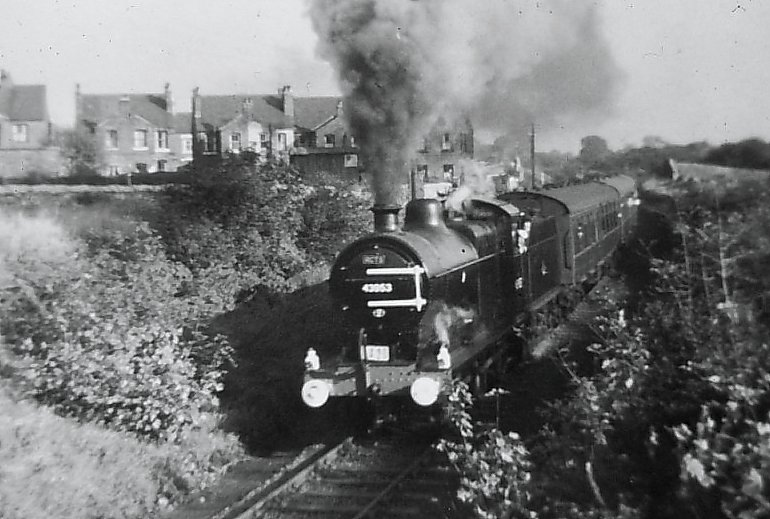
Steam special through Clowne 1965

== Freight ==
Light engine movements and intermittent freight trains continued over the Clowne Branch until the early 1990s when an underground fire threatened to undermine the line, compounded by the expensive need to replace the points connecting the branch to what is now known as the Robin Hood Line at Elmton and Creswell. These points were replaced by plain line, as were those at Oxcroft Colliery Junction. Superb images of the area are available on line but note that, as the aerial view on the site shows, "Oxcroft Colliery No 3" signalbox was near Barlborough Colliery, not Oxcroft Colliery.

== Present day ==
The trackbed is now a greenway with the platform of Clowne and Barlborough as well as Clowne South Station visible. The station site forms a greenway between Staveley and Creswell via Clowne.

Preceding station	Disused railways	Following station
Staveley Town; Line and station closed	Midland Railway; Clowne Branch	Creswell; Line closed, station open
