= Sheepbridge and Brimington railway station =

Former railway station in Derbyshire, England

Coordinates: 53°15′28″N 1°24′51″W

Sheepbridge and Brimington
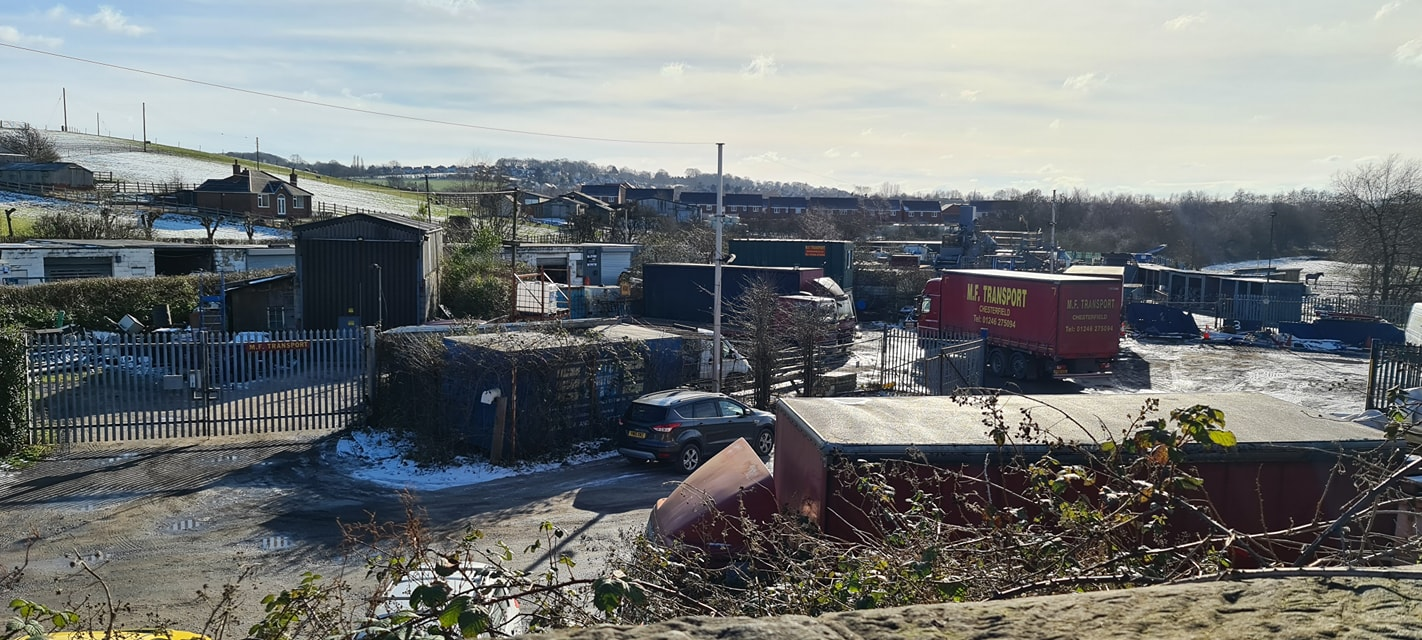
- The station site in 2021

General information
- Location: Chesterfield, Chesterfield; England
- Platforms: 2

Other information
- Status: Disused

History
- Original company: Manchester, Sheffield and Lincolnshire Railway
- Pre-grouping: Great Central Railway
- Post-grouping: LNER; British Railways

Key dates
- 4 June 1892: Opened
- 18 June 1951: Renamed Brimington
- 2 January 1956: Closed
Location

Sheepbridge and Brimington railway station was on the outskirts of the town of Chesterfield, Derbyshire.

The station was on the Great Central Chesterfield Loop which ran between Staveley Central and Heath Junction (just north of Heath railway station) on the Great Central Main Line. The station opened on 4 June 1892, was renamed to Brimington on 18 June 1951 and closed on 2 January 1956.

Preceding station	Disused railways	Following station
Staveley Works	Great Central Railway; Derbyshire Lines	Chesterfield Central
