= Grassmoor railway station =

Former railway station in Derbyshire, England

Coordinates: 53°12′42″N 1°23′28″W

Grassmoor
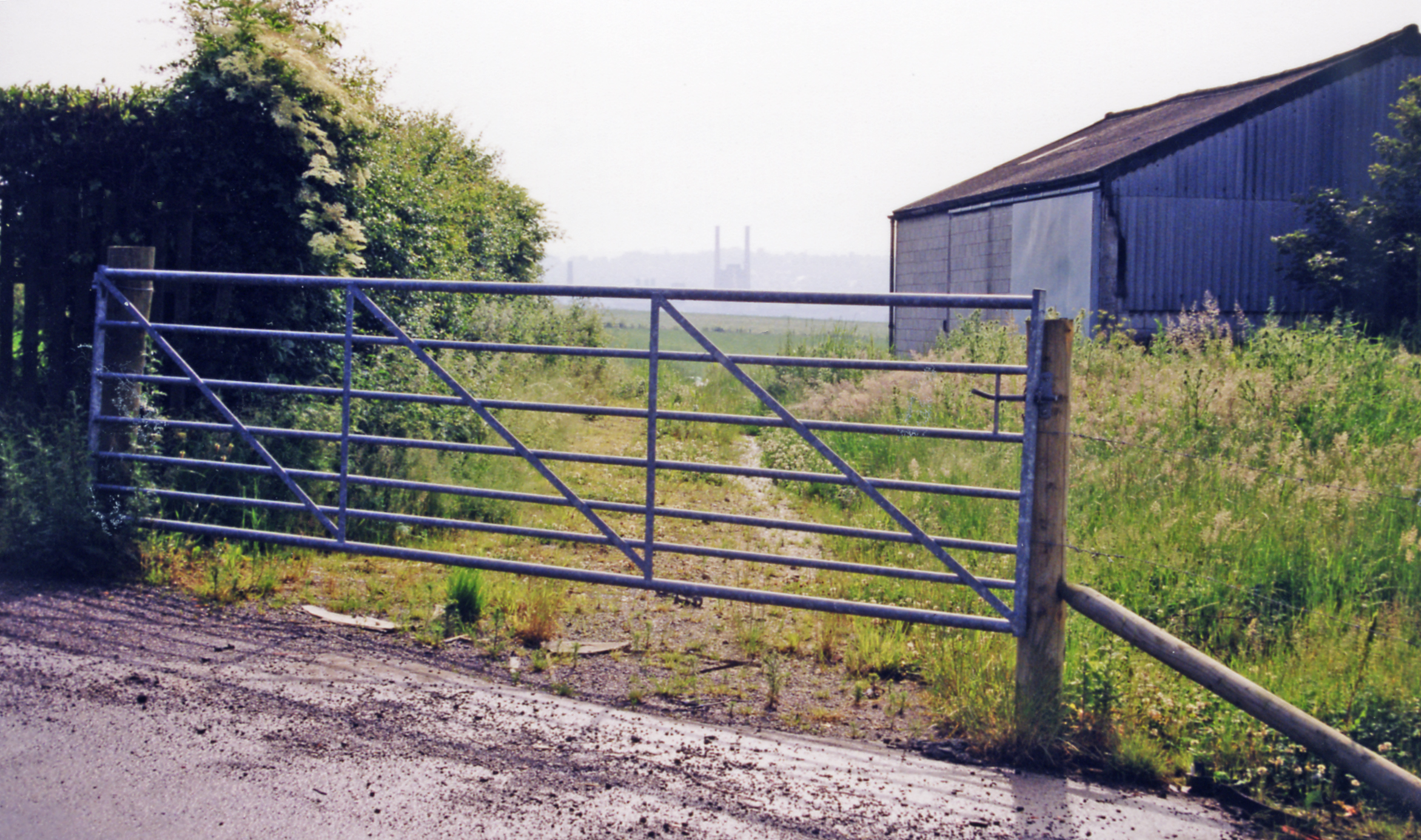
- View in 1998

General information
- Location: Hasland, Derbyshire, England

Other information
- Status: Disused

History
- Original company: Manchester, Sheffield and Lincolnshire Railway
- Pre-grouping: Great Central Railway
- Post-grouping: London and North Eastern Railway

Key dates
- 1 November 1893: Opened
- 28 October 1940: Closed
Location

Grassmoor railway station is a disused station serving the suburb of Hasland in Chesterfield and village of Grassmoor, Derbyshire, England. It operated from 1893 until 1940.

The station was on the Manchester, Sheffield and Lincolnshire Railway which was amalgamated into the Great Central Chesterfield Loop which ran between Staveley Central and Heath Junction (just north of Heath railway station) on the Great Central Main Line.

Preceding station	Disused railways	Following station
Chesterfield Central	Great Central Railway; Derbyshire Lines	Heath
