= Chesterfield Central railway station =

Former railway station in Derbyshire, England

Coordinates: 53°14′20.2″N 1°25′24.8″W

Chesterfield Central
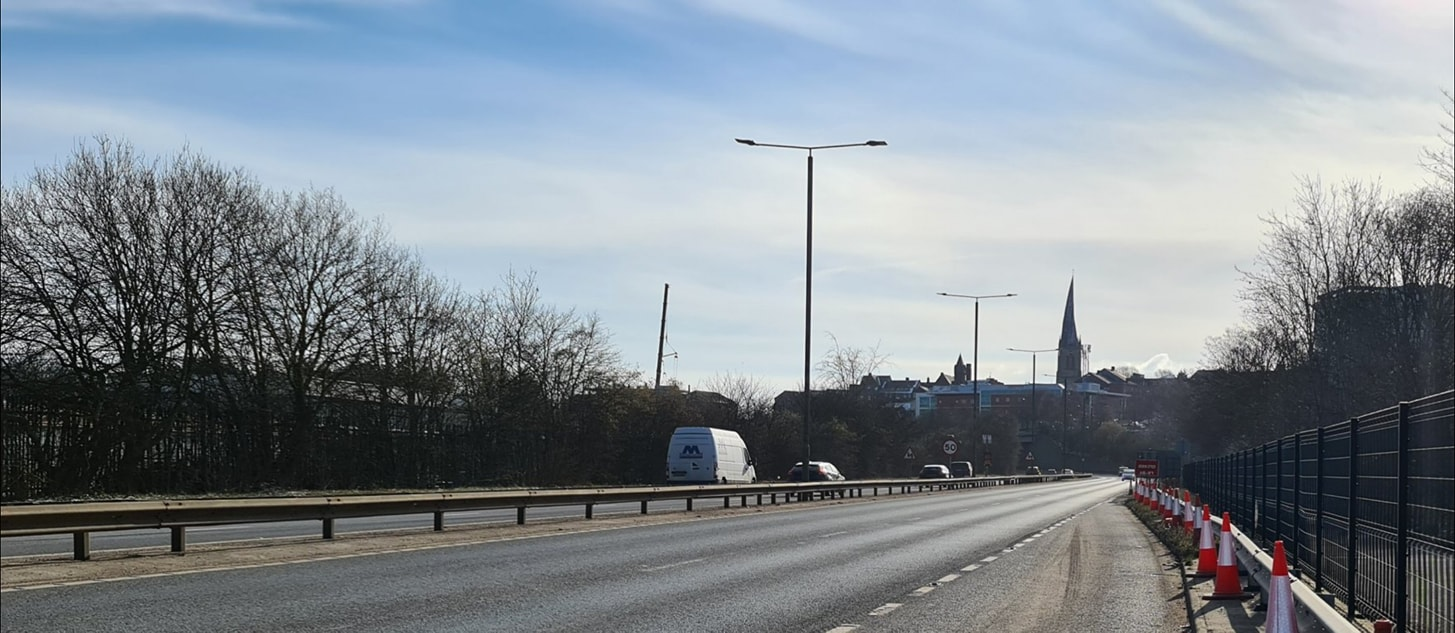

General information
- Location: Chesterfield, Derbyshire, England
- Platforms: 2

Other information
- Status: Disused

History
- Original company: Manchester, Sheffield and Lincolnshire Railway
- Pre-grouping: Great Central Railway
- Post-grouping: LNER; British Railways

Key dates
- 4 June 1892: Opened
- 1 November 1907: renamed Chesterfield Central
- 4 March 1963: Closed
Location

Chesterfield Central was a railway station serving the town of Chesterfield, Derbyshire, England.

== History ==
The station was on the Great Central (GCR) Chesterfield Loop which ran between Staveley Central and Heath Junction (just north of Heath railway station) on the Great Central Main Line. The station opened in 1892 and was closed in 1963. Although the official closing date was 4 March 1963, the last passenger train to use the station did so on 15 June, when 'Flying Scotsman' stopped there during a Railway Preservation Society tour from Sheffield Victoria to Marylebone. It remained open for goods traffic until 11 September, and a private siding continued in use after that.

Compared to nearby Chesterfield Midland, the station was little used. The number of passengers using the station during the week ending 19 August 1961 was 1,829, whereas Midland station was used by 22,285 passengers in the same week, over twelve times as many.

The station was demolished by 1973 to make way for Chesterfield's inner-relief road, much of which was built along the former trackbed of the GCR. This dual-carriageway now forms part of the A61 road. The 410-yard (370 m) tunnel immediately to the south of the station, which ran from Brewery Street to Hollis Lane, remains in place, sealed at its northern end due to the road construction.

== See also ==
Chesterfield was, at one time, served by three railway stations. The other two are:

- Chesterfield Midland station (still in use)
- Chesterfield Market Place station

Preceding station	Disused railways	Following station
Sheepbridge and Brimington	Great Central Railway; Derbyshire Lines	Grassmoor
