= Staveley Town railway station =

Former railway station in Derbyshire, England

Staveley Town
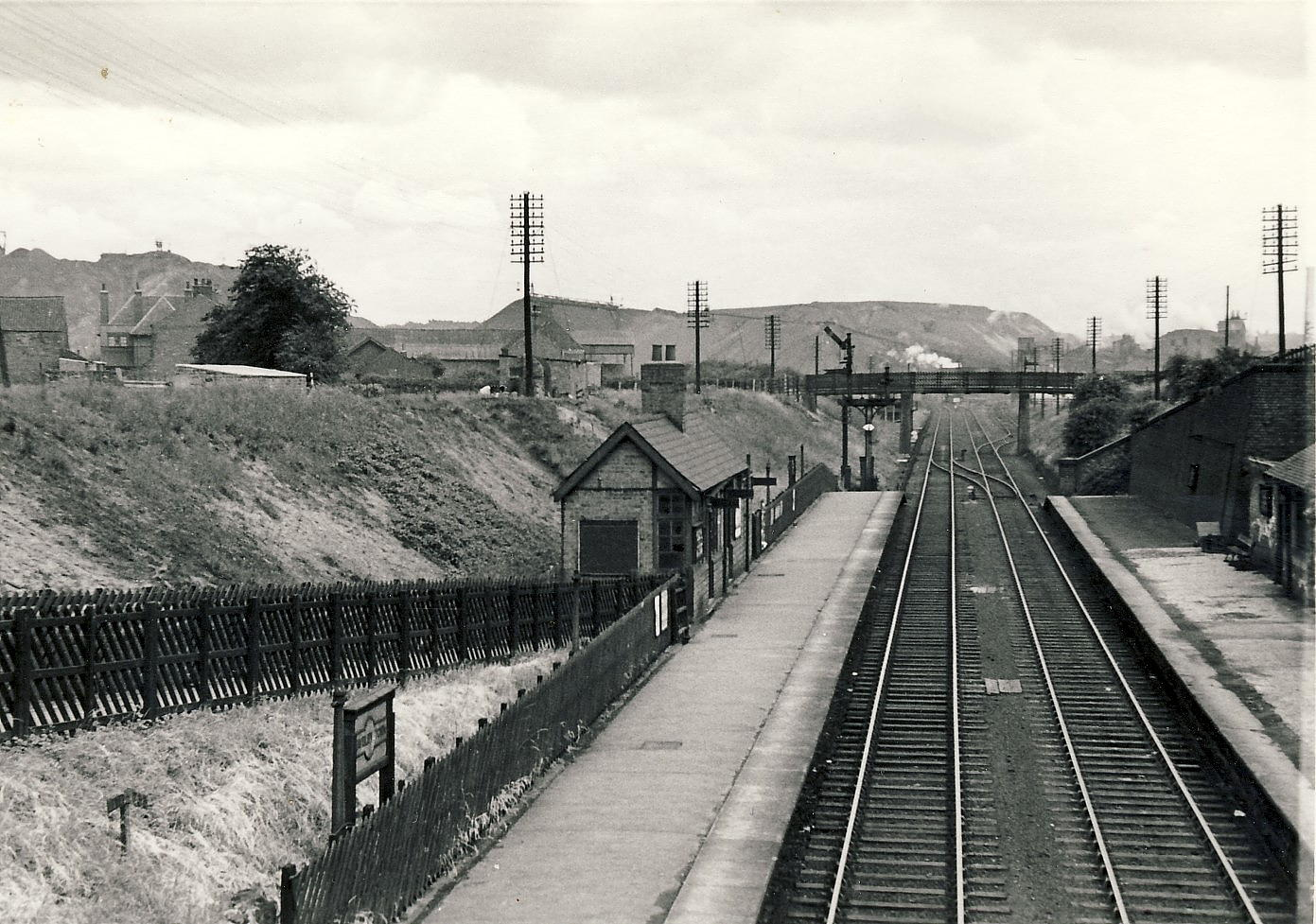
- The station in 1956

General information
- Location: Staveley; Chesterfield, Derbyshire; England
- Coordinates: 53°16′9″N 1°20′34″W
- Grid reference: SK 439 748
- Platforms: 2

Other information
- Status: Disused

History
- Original company: Midland Railway
- Post-grouping: LMS; British Railways

Key dates
- 1 November 1888: opened (Clowne branch line only) as Netherthorpe
- 1 September 1890: Doe Lea branch line opened
- 25 October 1893: Renamed Netherthorpe for Staveley Town
- 1 June 1900: Renamed Staveley Town
- 28 July 1930: Doe Lea branch line closed to passengers
- 5 August 1952: Closed
- 1952-54: Platforms demolished
Location

Staveley Town is a disused railway station in Staveley, Derbyshire in England.

== Similarly-named stations ==
This station should not be confused with Staveley Central which was about 250 yards away on the same street, and which was also called Staveley Town from its opening in 1892 until it was renamed by British Railways in 1950.

Nor should it be confused with Barrow Hill, which in its early years was named Staveley. Barrow Hill was the next stop along the line towards Chesterfield from Staveley Town. Nor should it be confused with Staveley between Windermere and Kendal in Cumbria.

== Context ==
The station was on the circuitous Barrow Hill to Elmton & Creswell line via Clowne and Barlborough and the equally circuitous Barrow Hill to Mansfield Woodhouse via Pleasley West line. Those routes diverged at Seymour Junction, about a 1/2 mile (800 m) to the east of the station. The line to Pleasley was known as the Doe Lea Branch because it followed the River Doe Lea for several miles. The line to Creswell was known as the Clowne branch line.

== History ==
The station opened without ceremony on 1 November 1888, for services along the Clowne branch line. It was initially called Netherthorpe, being in the Netherthorpe area of Staveley. On 25 October 1893, it became Netherthorpe for Staveley Town. It was renamed Staveley Town on 1 June 1900. Services calling at the station increased with the opening of the Doe Lea branch line on 1 September 1890.

The station was situated in a cutting between the Lowgates overbridge and a footbridge from Fan Road to Netherthorpe, both of which survive. It had two opposing platforms with small buildings on each of which no trace remains. There was a further building at street level still survive, with modifications, and is now a private residence.

Normal passenger traffic over the Doe Lea branch line ceased in 1930 and the route was severed by the closure of Rowthorn Tunnel near Hardwick Hall. Coal traffic nevertheless remained the lifeblood of the line. The station closed to passenger traffic on 5 August 1952. In the 1960s, pits began to be worked out. Ramcroft Colliery near Glapwell closed in 1966, followed by Glapwell Colliery in 1974, after which the line beyond Bolsover Castle fell into disuse. The line between Bolsover and Glapwell Colliery was taken out of use as from 31 October 1978. It was eventually lifted later in 1978.

Bolsover and Markham Collieries continued to produce coal in large quantities. That was supplemented by traffic to and from the Coalite and Chemical Works at Bolsover, and Bolsover Castle station remained open for goods until 1 November 1962, and in usable condition for passenger traffic at least until 1981, which led to some remarkable trains, notably by Miners' Welfare specials to distant points, and by specials in connection with the Silver Jubilee of Elizabeth II in 1977, all of which passed through the site of Staveley Town station. The last steam trains to use the line were enthusiasts' specials. On 16 October 1965, a "Last 4F" Midlands Tour ran along the Clowne branch line and to Glapwell, then through the site of Staveley Town. On 1 October 1966, a Railway Correspondence and Travel Society Notts & Yorks railtour passed through and is believed to have been the last.

Normal passenger traffic over the Clowne branch line ceased in 1954. Remarkably, the last train was operated by a brand new diesel multiple unit. Timetabled summer weekend excursion traffic, notably from Radford to Blackpool, continued until 1962, along with football specials. These duly passed through the site of Staveley Town.

Occasional freight and light engine movements over the Clowne branch line continued until the 1990s, when an underground fire threatened to undermine the line, compounded by the expensive need to replace the points connecting the branch to what is now known as the Robin Hood Line at Elmton & Creswell. The points were replaced by straight track, as were those at Oxcroft Colliery Junction. The single track between is largely intact, but heavily overgrown.

Bolsover Colliery closed in 1993 and Markham Colliery closed in 1994, followed by Coalite in 2004, which left no traffic on the Doe Lea branch line.

A temporary reprieve for the line through the site of Staveley Town station was obtained following the closure of Arkwright Colliery in 1988. The Arkwright site was eventually opencasted then landscaped, with startling visual impact. The opencast coal was transported by lorry along the trackbed of the Great Central Main Line north of Arkwright, thence to Oxcroft Disposal Point near Shuttlewood, where it was loaded onto Merry-go-Round trains which ran through Oxcroft Colliery Junction, Seymour Junction, the station site and Hall Lane Junction, to join the ex-MR Chesterfield to Rotherham "Back Line" at Foxlow Junction. That traffic came to a natural end in 2006. On 4 March 2006, the Branch Line Society ran a last train special through the station site to the disposal point boundary.

== Accidents and incidents ==
On 17 November 1899, Charles Harry Bennion was working as a goods guard at the station. Visibility was low due to thick fog and due to a 'signaller error' an engine collided with a carriage that Bennion was in, killing him instantly.

== Possible future ==
The line through the station site to Seymour Junction and Oxcroft Disposal Point has been mothballed as there remains the possibility of opencast mining in the area. For example, in 2005, UK Coal expressed interest in extracting c530,000 tons near Mastin Moor. The Doe Lea line South to Bolsover (now known as The Bolsover Branch) has been mothballed because it runs through the new Markham Vale Enterprise Zone at M1 Junction 29A It is hoped that someone will invest in this infrastructure to create a road-rail interchange. The branch beyond Bolsover is now a public bridleway known as The Stockley Trail.

| Preceding station | Disused railways | Following station |
|---|---|---|
| Barrow Hill; Line and station closed | Midland Railway; Clowne Branch | Clowne & Barlborough; Line and station closed |
| Barrow Hill; Line and station closed | Midland Railway; Doe Lea Branch | Bolsover Castle; Line and station closed |
