= South Yorkshire People's Network =

Future transport network in South Yorkshire, England

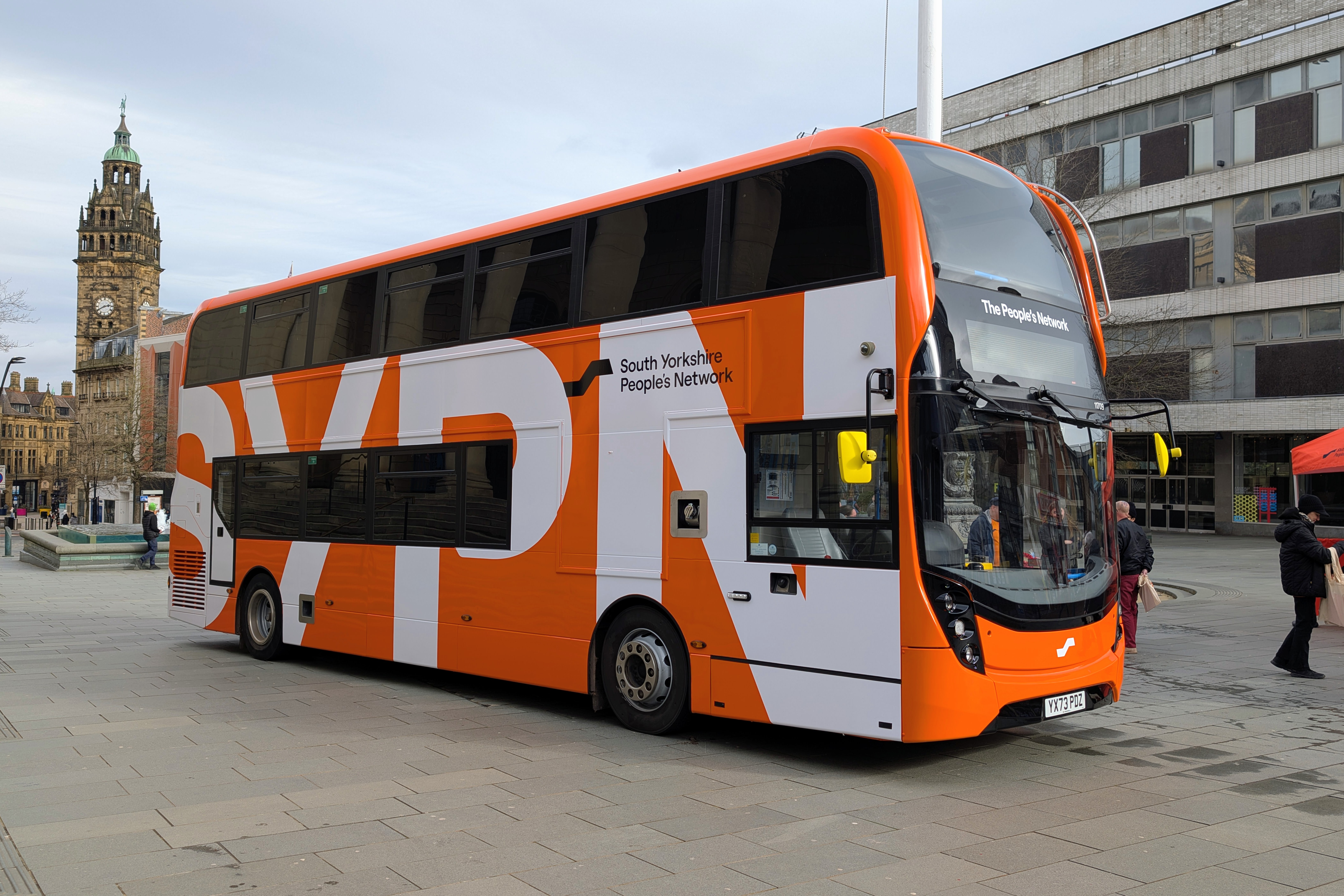
- A bus displaying a promotional livery (Note: This is not the final South Yorkshire People's Network livery, which will consist of all-over molten orange with black South Yorkshire People's Network logos.) at the People's Network launch event

Overview
- Owner: South Yorkshire Mayoral Combined Authority
- Area served: South Yorkshire
- Transit type: Air travel; Buses; Commuter rail; Cycling; Park and ride; Trams and tram-trains; Walking
- Headquarters: Sheffield
- Website: sypn.gov.uk

Operation
- Began operation: 2027 (planned)
- Operator: to be confirmed

The South Yorkshire People's Network (SYPN), also branded as The People's Network, is an integrated transport network in South Yorkshire, England. It comprises bus, tram and cycling routes, including the South Yorkshire Supertram light rail network.

The network branding was unveiled on 16 March 2026 by the South Yorkshire Mayoral Combined Authority (SYMCA), with the People's Network to begin replacing the previous Travel South Yorkshire brand by the end of 2026. The project creates a London-style transport system, to encourage more people to take public transport instead of cars.

== Design ==
The branding design and name of the network were revealed by the South Yorkshire Mayoral Combined Authority with a public event held in Barker's Pool in Sheffield city centre on 16 March 2026. The logo consists of a stylised letter "S" in orange on a white or dark grey background, depending on branding context. According to official People's Network branding documents, the "S" stands for South Yorkshire and the four perimeter lines which make up the stylised letter represent the main settlements of the region: Barnsley, Doncaster, Rotherham and Sheffield. Additionally, the name alludes to the region's nickname of the People's Republic of South Yorkshire, reflecting its historically aggressive left-leaning politics.

The primary branding colour of the network is described as "molten orange," reflecting the historic industrial heritage of the South Yorkshire region, such as the fires of industrial furnaces and molten steel. (Note: Sheffield is commonly nicknamed the Steel City, and steel factories which remain in operation include Sheffield Forgemasters.) Secondary colours used across the branding are grey and "asphalt black," reflecting the region's coal-mining heritage.

== History ==
During his 2022 election campaign for Mayor of South Yorkshire, Oliver Coppard pledged to establish bus franchising in South Yorkshire, on the basis that an independent audit had recommended it and following the implementation of the similar Bee Network in Greater Manchester. Coppard won the 2022 and subsequent 2024 elections, and subsequently commenced preliminary work into the establishment of a South Yorkshire integrated transport network.

== Bus franchising ==
In March 2025, Coppard announced that he would bring buses back into public control, unified under the South Yorkshire People's Network brand. The local authority were to purchase a new fleet of electric buses to replace the fleet of diesel vehicles, which as of March 2026 had an average age across the county of 12 years. The first electric buses were to arrive in autumn 2027, and with more than 30% of the county's bus fleet transitioned to electric by the time franchised services commenced.

On 1 August 2025, an initial two-year trial of free bus travel for 5- to 18-year-olds (Note: Children aged under 5-years-old could already travel for free across South Yorkshire prior to the launch of the People's Network.) commenced in Barnsley. Eligible passengers present an ID card, known as the MiCard, to claim free travel. Upon the launch of the People's Network, it was confirmed that free travel for under-18s would be made permanent and be extended across the county from 2027.

The South Yorkshire Mayoral Combined Authority (SYMCA) completed the compulsory purchase of five bus depots across South Yorkshire on 26 March 2026, marking an important milestone towards the rollout of publicly-run bus services. The depots will continue to be used and leased out to their present operators up until the time of franchising going live in each respective area. On 2 April 2026, the SYMCA opened the procurement process to appoint the manufacturer of the future fleet of People's Network buses.

=== Tranche 1 ===
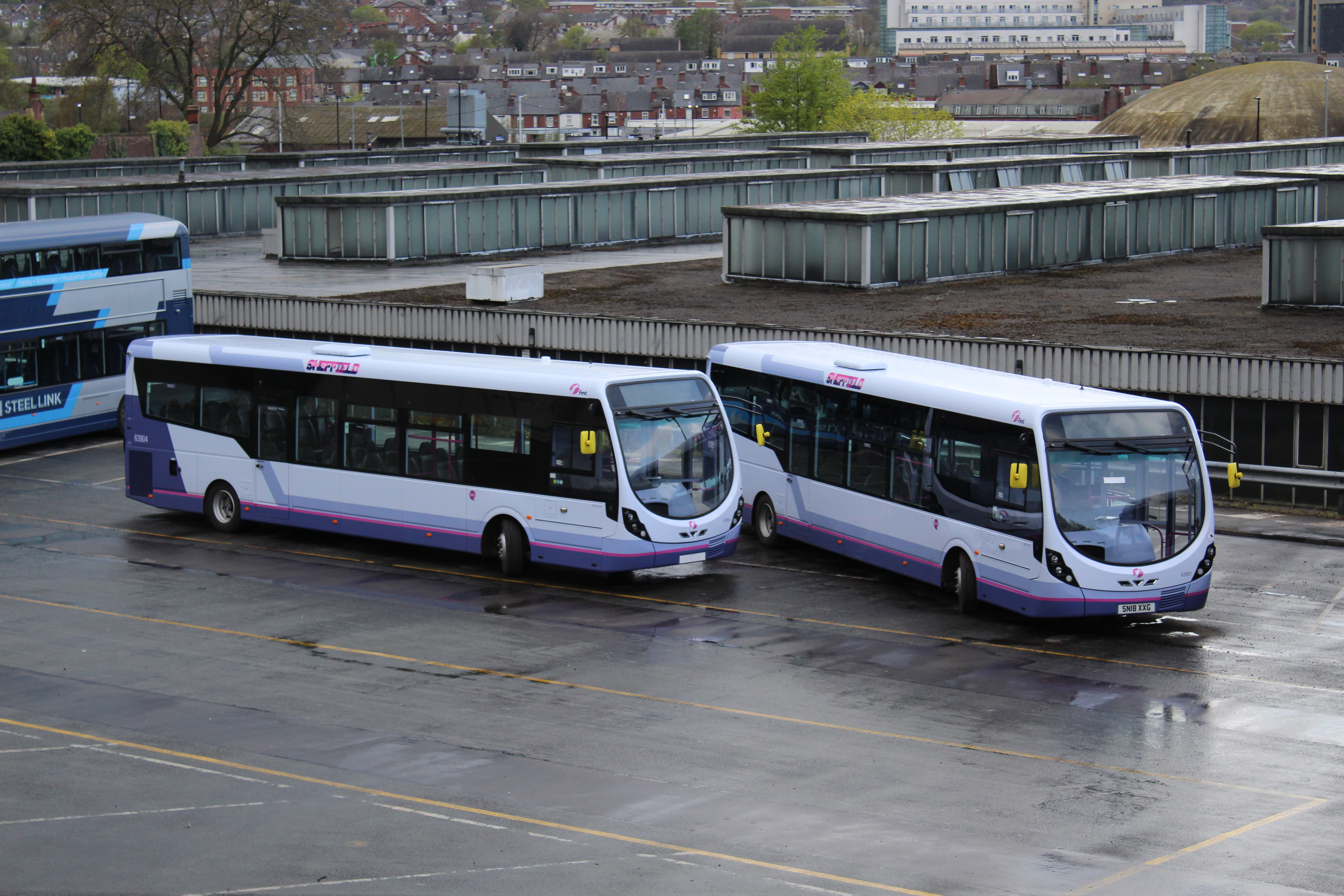
FirstGroup's Olive Grove depot has been returned to public ownership under Tranche 1

The first phase of bus franchising under the South Yorkshire People's Network, known as Tranche 1, will consist of services operated out of Olive Grove bus depot in Sheffield and Leger Way bus depot in Doncaster, both operated prior to franchising by First South Yorkshire. These services prior to franchising had a daily peak vehicle requirement of around 400 vehicles. Services under Tranche 1 of the franchising programme are scheduled to transfer to South Yorkshire People's Network operation on 5 September 2027.

Leger Way depot was already owned by the City of Doncaster Council and leased to pre-franchising operator First, so ownership was transferred from the council to SYMCA. By June 2025, preliminary negotiations were underway between the SYMCA and FirstGroup for the compulsory purchase of Olive Grove depot. On 12 March 2026, the SYMCA announced that 186 new electric buses would be introduced in Sheffield in 2027 as the first phase of fleet renewal; including the cost of upgrading depots and providing appropriate charging infrastructure, the plans would result in a total investment of £92.7 million.

The deal covering the transfer of Olive Grove from FirstGroup to SYMCA ownership was completed on 26 March 2026, and a programme of essential roof repairs at the depot was announced in order to allow the depot to safely house its planned fleet of more than 220 new buses. Leger Way depot is planned to receive a fleet of around 110 new buses. The first phase of bidding for the two Tranche 1 contracts opened on 2 April 2026 after the SYMCA issued the Procurement Specific Questionnaire and Invitation to Participate documents to prospective bidders. Potential operators are allowed to bid for both the Leger Way and Olive Grove contracts, but may only be awarded one of them.

SYMCA announced on 26 June 2026 that six potential operators had been shortlisted and invited to submit formal bids for the Tranche 1 contracts; at this stage, the identities of these operators has not been revealed. The successful bidder will be announced in early 2027.

=== Tranche 2 ===
The second phase, Tranche 2, will consist of services operated out of Rawmarsh bus depot in Rotherham and Wakefield Road bus depot in Barnsley, both operated prior to franchising by Stagecoach Yorkshire with a peak vehicle requirement of around 175 vehicles. Services under Tranche 2 of the franchising programme are scheduled to transfer to People's Network operation in 2028. Rawmarsh depot will be upgraded, with the construction of new office buildings on site to replace existing temporary structures. Tranche 2 contracts are expected to be developed in such a way as to allow small and medium enterprises (SMEs) to be able to bid for them, alongside traditional larger national bus operators.

=== Tranche 3 ===
The third phase, Tranche 3, will consist of services operated out of the current Stagecoach Yorkshire depots at Ecclesfield and Holbrook and the current TM Travel (Wellglade Group) depot at Halfway, all of which are in Sheffield. Services from these depots have a combined daily peak vehicle requirement of around 200 vehicles. Services under Tranche 3 of the franchising programme are scheduled to transfer to People's Network operation in 2029. Ecclesfield depot will be upgraded, with the construction of new office buildings on site to replace existing temporary structures, and Halfway depot will be closed with services transferred to nearby Holbrook. Tranche 3 contracts are expected to be developed in such a way as to allow small and medium enterprises (SMEs) to be able to bid for them, alongside traditional larger national bus operators.

== Commuter rail ==
The initial People's Network planning documents committed to delivering South Yorkshire's portion of the wider Northern Powerhouse Rail project and integrating this into the county's wider transport network, providing upgraded railway stations, more frequent and reliable local rail services, and new rolling stock. Additionally, there will be collaboration with the equivalent Weaver Network in West Yorkshire and local authorities in East and North Yorkshire to deliver White Rose Yorkshire's Plan for Rail to strengthen commuter rail services across Yorkshire, and support for the government's plans to electrify the Midland Main Line as far as Sheffield. Ultimately, there are plans for faster, more frequent and more reliable services between South Yorkshire and Leeds, York and Manchester, which may be achieved by additional electrification of the local commuter rail network through negotiations with the state-owned Great British Railways.

There are plans for the construction of a new station on the Sheffield–Lincoln line at Waverley, between Darnall and Woodhouse. This would serve the Advanced Manufacturing Park and the new housing developments at Waverley. As well as being served by Sheffield to Lincoln commuter trains, the new station may also be served by Sheffield to Chesterfield tram-trains on a new extension. Plans are also under development for the construction of a new Rotherham Gateway mainline station – potentially a reopening of Masborough station, or a mainline extension of Parkgate station – in order to provide direct services from Rotherham to London and reduce journey times between Rotherham and Leeds by thirty minutes. Both Doncaster and Sheffield stations will be refurbished and expanded to increase capacity and provide space for additional services across the region, and there are plans to support the introduction of a direct Barnsley to London rail service.

== Light rail and tram-train ==
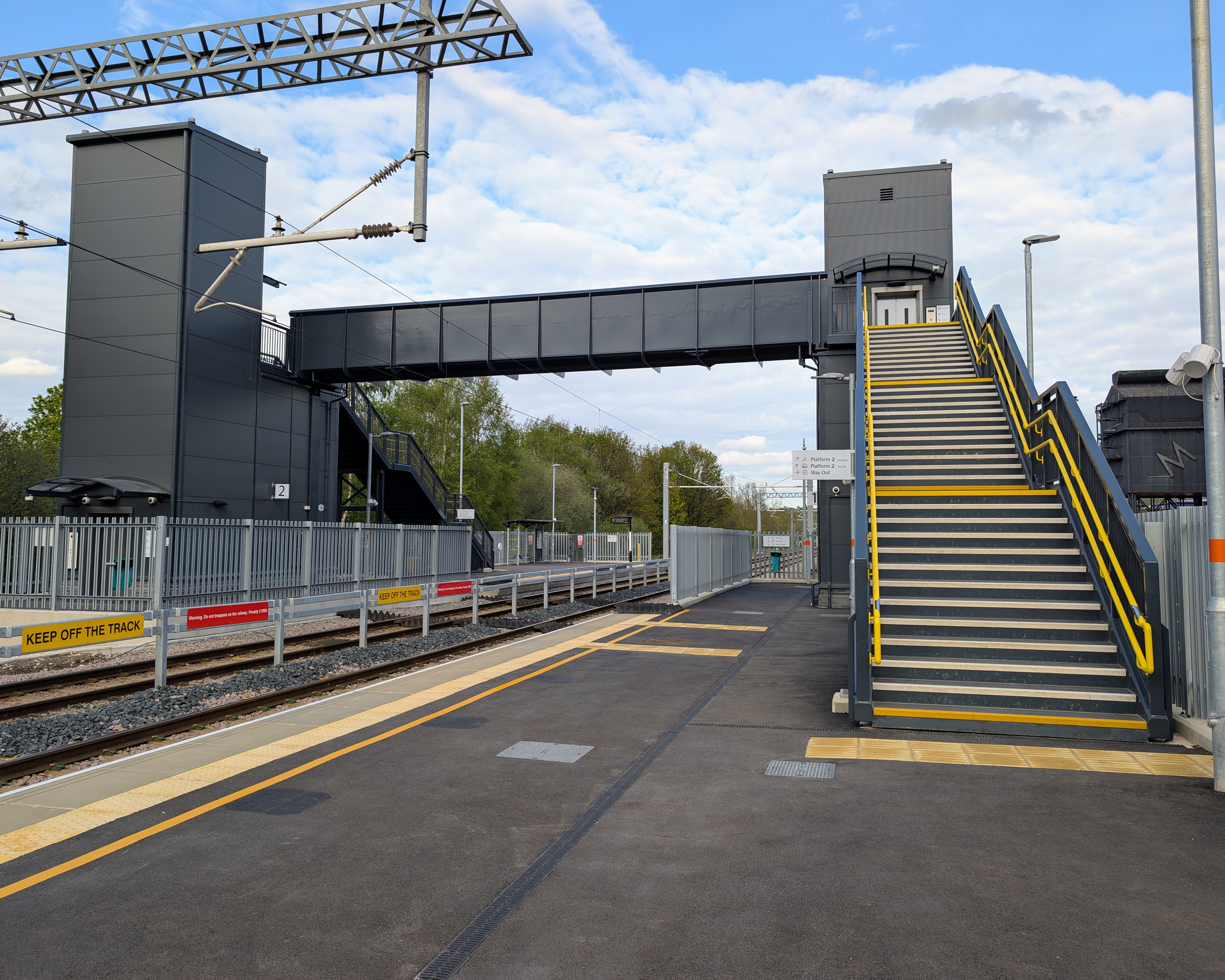
The opening of a new tram-train station at Magna in Rotherham was one of the first acts of the People's Network after launch

Following the expiration of the Stagecoach Group's tender to operate the South Yorkshire Supertram network, it came back into public ownership on 22 March 2024, initially operated by the SYMCA arm's length holding company South Yorkshire Future Trams. In future, the Supertram network will be integrated into the People's Network and receive the same molten orange branding on vehicles and tram stops, although the Supertram brand name will be retained.

Following the official People's Network launch, the SYMCA received £630 million in funding to renew and expand the Supertram network. Plans are being developed to upgrade existing tram stops, expand the network to new destinations, renew the existing tracks and signalling equipment, and procure a new fleet of trams to entirely replace the existing 35-year-old fleet of Siemens-Duewag Supertrams.

As part of plans to improve the passenger experience on board Supertram, Mayor Oliver Coppard announced a pilot scheme to trial allowing dogs to travel on board trams from March 2025 following a public consultation. The decision to allow one "well-behaved" dog per passenger to travel on board Supertram was made permanent from October 2025 following positive feedback to the pilot scheme.

=== Extension of the network ===
Construction of a long-proposed new tram-train station at Magna commenced in March 2025, with SYMCA contributing £6.6 million towards construction costs. The station will feature 100 car parking spaces as part of a park and ride scheme and will serve the adjacent Magna Science Adventure Centre when it opens on 9 April 2026, marking the first new infrastructure project to be completed under the People's Network banner.

Plans are being developed for three initial extension projects of the Supertram network using either traditional trams or tram-trains. The first of these is a development of the long-running Don Valley Railway proposal and would see the re-opening of the former Woodhead line to tram-trains between the abandoned Sheffield Victoria station and Deepcar, with an extension from there into the centre of Stocksbridge. The Woodhead line closed to regular passenger services in January 1970, and the section as far as Deepcar was used by freight trains accessing the Stocksbridge steelworks from then until being officially mothballed in September 2024. On this reopened line, there would be stations at Sheffield city centre (Victoria), Oughtibridge, Wharncliffe Side, Deepcar and Stocksbridge, with the potential to also reopen former Woodhead line stations at Neepsend and Wadsley Bridge. In April 2026, £7.5 million in funding was secured from the Department for Transport in order to support feasibility studies into the Stocksbridge extension proposal.

A second proposal consists of the conversion of the at-present freight-only railway line via Barrow Hill into tram-train operation. This would see trains operate between Sheffield and Chesterfield, potentially calling at Darnall, Waverley, Woodhouse, Beighton, Killamarsh, Eckington, Barrow Hill (or Staveley) and Whittington. Waverley would be a newly-constructed station to serve the new Waverley housing development and the Advanced Manufacturing Park, while all stations between Beighton and Whittington would be reopened former stations. The proposed scheme revives plans that were put on hold due to a government spending review in 2024.

There is also a proposal under development for the construction of a second tram line across Sheffield city centre, which would extend directly to the Royal Hallamshire Hospital which at present is a more than 15 minute walk along a steep hill away from the nearest tram stop on the Blue and Yellow lines.

=== New rolling stock ===
The existing trams used by the Supertram network are a fleet of 25 Siemens-Duewag Supertrams constructed in 1992, supplemented by seven Stadler Citylink Class 399 tram-trains constructed in 2014 for the Parkgate extension. Regardless of the timeline of any network extensions and capacity upgrades that would require their own new vehicles, the entire fleet of Siemens-Duewag trams is expected to be replaced by new vehicles between 2030 and 2035.

== Other ventures ==
=== Active mobility ===
In 2025, Sheffield City Council announced that they would follow up £27 million in investment in the city's cycling infrastructure over the preceding two years with the launch of an electric bicycle public rental system in the city from April 2026. Following the People's Network launch, this scheme was taken under the SYPN umbrella and the launch date pushed back to 2027, with the SYMCA providing £9 million in funding to provide 900 e-bikes across Sheffield at launch. This will be expanded across South Yorkshire at a later date.

Infrastructure will be upgraded to support active mobility across South Yorkshire, whether through the bicycle rental system or privately-owned bicycles. Secure bike parking will be provided at all tram stops and upgraded at railway stations, and spaces will be provided on buses, trams and trains for bicycles to be carried. Pedestrian crossings will be upgraded and pedestrianisation schemes explored. The People's Network plans to apply for legal powers to ban car parking on pavements across South Yorkshire, an idea which has already been implemented in Greater London.

=== Airport reopening ===
The only international airport in South Yorkshire, Doncaster Sheffield Airport, was closed by its owner The Peel Group in 2022 following the withdrawal of Flybe and Wizz Air flights from the airport and a decline in passenger numbers as a result of the COVID-19 pandemic. City of Doncaster Council subsequently announced their intention to take the airport into public ownership via a compulsory purchase. The purchase was completed in March 2024 with £3 million of funding from the SYMCA, and Munich Airport International were appointed as the airport's operator.

Following the launch of the People's Network, the airport reopening plans were brought under its umbrella, with passenger flights planned to re-commence from 2028. Longer-term plans are in place for the improvement of bus services to the airport after re-opening and the construction of a long-proposed railway station at the airport on a new spur line from the nearby East Coast Main Line.
