= Staveley Works railway station =

Former railway station in Derbyshire, England

Coordinates: 53°16′01″N 1°22′45″W

Staveley Works
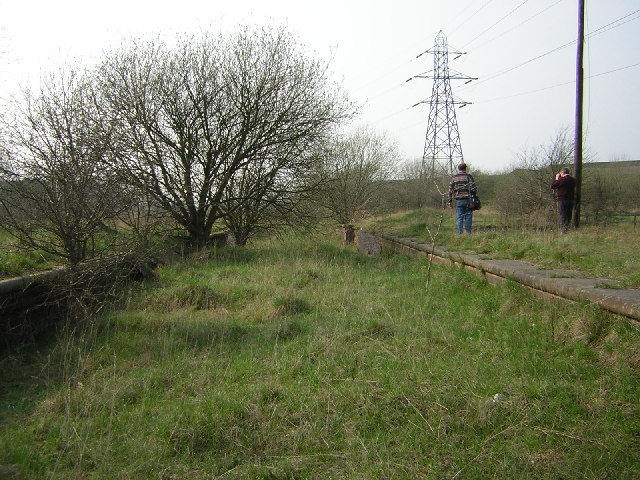
- Site of Staveley Works in 2005

General information
- Location: Staveley, Chesterfield; England
- Grid reference: SK413746
- Platforms: 2

Other information
- Status: Disused

History
- Original company: Manchester, Sheffield and Lincolnshire Railway
- Pre-grouping: Great Central Railway
- Post-grouping: LNER; British Railways

Key dates
- 4 June 1892: Opened
- 4 March 1963: Closed
Location

Staveley Works railway station was on the outskirts of the town of Staveley, Derbyshire.

The station was on the Great Central Chesterfield Loop which ran between Staveley Central and Heath Junction (just north of Heath railway station) on the Great Central Main Line.

Preceding station	Disused railways	Following station
Staveley Central	Great Central Railway; Derbyshire Lines	Sheepbridge and Brimington
