= Sheepbridge railway station =

Former railway station in Derbyshire, England

Coordinates: 53°15′43″N 1°25′44″W

Sheepbridge
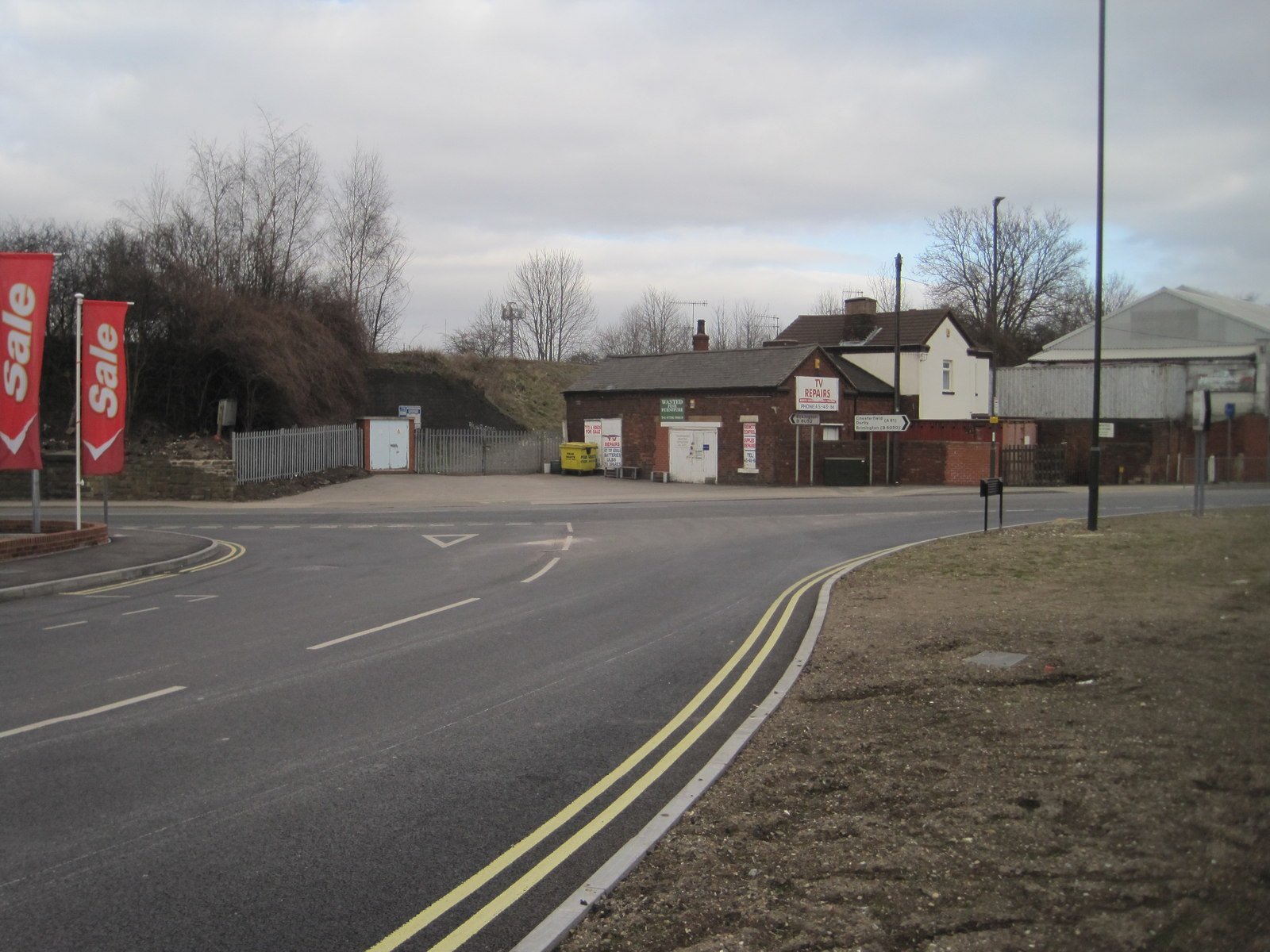

General information
- Location: Whittington, Borough of Chesterfield; England

Other information
- Status: Disused

History
- Original company: Midland Railway
- Post-grouping: London, Midland and Scottish Railway

Key dates
- 1 August 1870: Station opened
- 8 October 1897: renamed Sheepbridge and Whittington Moor
- 18 June 1951: renamed Sheepbridge
- 2 January 1967: Station closes
Location

Sheepbridge railway station was a station in Chesterfield, Derbyshire, England.

It was built by the Midland Railway in 1870 on what is known to railwaymen as the "New Road" to Sheffield. This bypassed the North Midland Railway's original line, which had avoided Sheffield due to the gradients involved and came to be known as the "Old Road".

Between 1897 and 1957 it was known as Sheepbridge and Whittington Moor. It was only used for passengers, goods being dealt with at a depot on a nearby branch. The platforms were built over the highway, with timber waiting rooms without canopies. The brick built booking office was at road level on Station Road with footpaths to the platforms, the up line to London was accessed via the footpath under the station bridge . It was closed in 1967. The booking office building still exists and is currently in use as a television repair shop.

After leaving Chesterfield the line diverged at Tapton Junction, Sheepbridge marking the beginning of the long 1 in 100 climb through Broomhouse Tunnel to Unstone.

Preceding station	Historical railways	Following station
Chesterfield Midland; Line and station open	Midland Railway; Midland Main Line	Unstone; Line open, station closed
