= Renishaw Central railway station =

Former railway station in Derbyshire, England

Renishaw Central
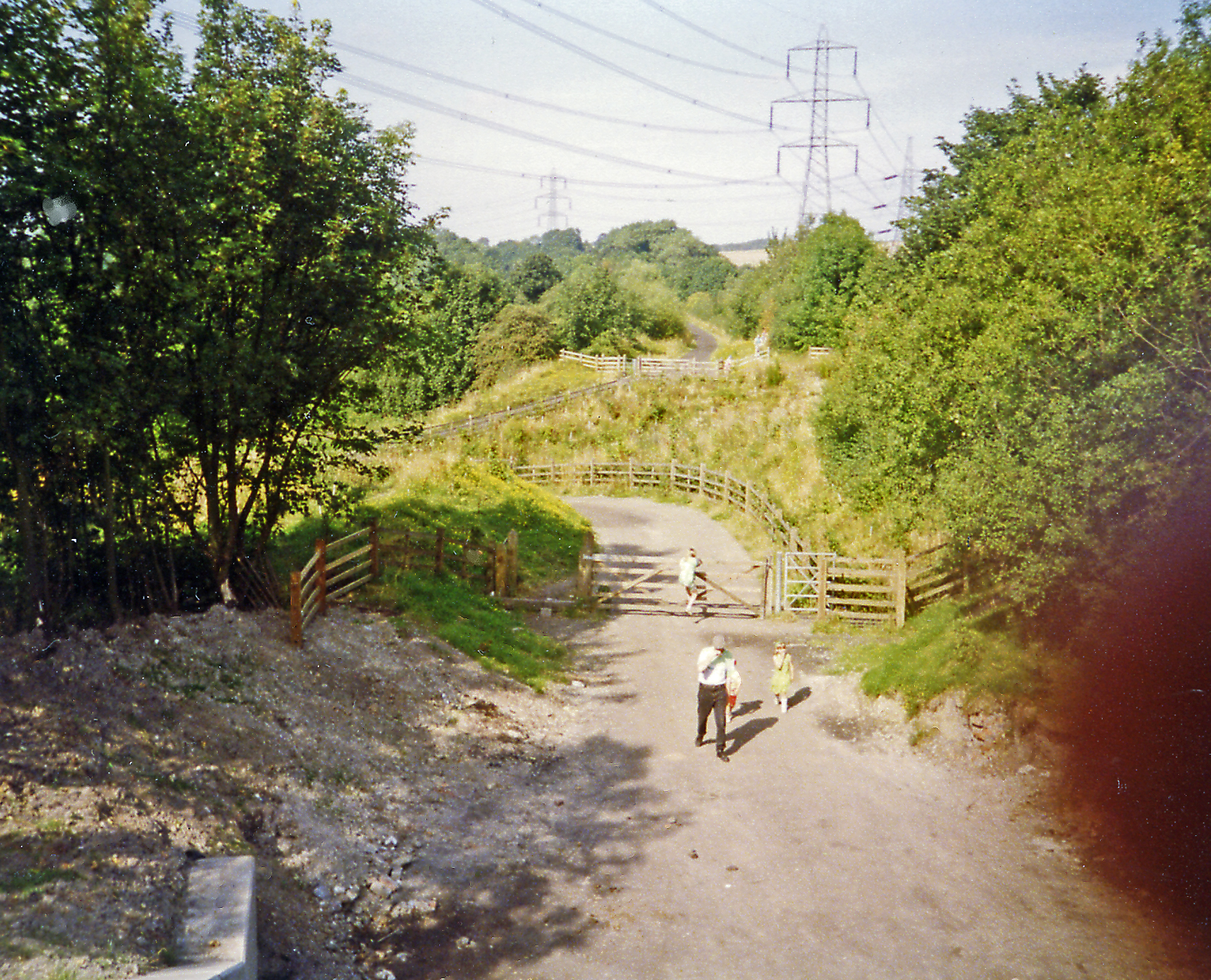
- Station site in 1993.

General information
- Location: Renishaw, North East Derbyshire; England
- Coordinates: 53.2983°N 1.3345°W
- Grid reference: SK443781
- Platforms: 2

Other information
- Status: Disused

History
- Original company: MS&LR
- Pre-grouping: Great Central Railway
- Post-grouping: LNER; British Railways

Key dates
- 1 June 1892: Opened as Eckington & Renishaw
- 25 September 1950: Renamed Renishaw Central
- 4 March 1963: Closed for passengers
- 14 June 1965: Closed for freight
Location

Renishaw Central is a former railway station in Renishaw, Derbyshire, England.

From its opening the station was named Eckington and Renishaw, but it was renamed "Renishaw Central" in 1950 by British Railways to prevent confusion with the nearby ex-Midland Railway station, also called Eckington and Renishaw.

The station was on the Great Central Main Line which ran between London Marylebone and Manchester Piccadilly via Sheffield Victoria. It had two platforms with wooden waiting rooms and canopies and a wooden ticket office on an overbridge at the southern end.

The station was the junction for a Great Central branch to Renishaw Ironworks. A Midland branch to the ironworks passed under the platforms. There was also a branch to Renishaw Park colliery.

== Modern times ==
The station has been demolished, but the trackbed forms part of the Central Section of the Trans Pennine Trail.

Preceding station	Disused railways	Following station
Killamarsh Central; Line and station closed	Great Central Railway; Derbyshire Lines	Staveley Central; Line and station closed
