= Lenton railway station =

Railway station in Nottinghamshire, England

Lenton
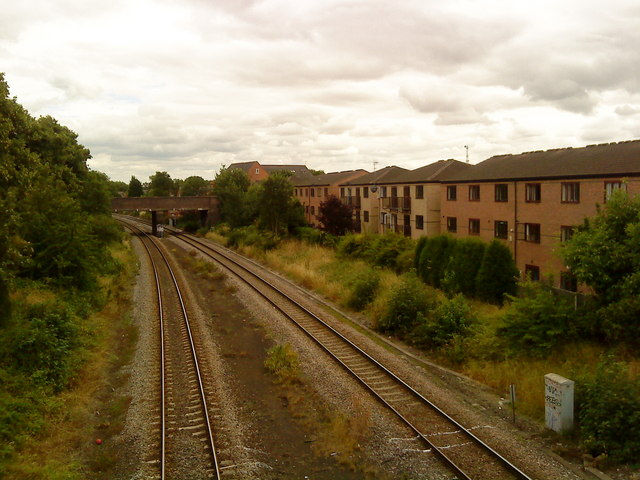
- The site of the station in 2010

General information
- Location: Lenton, Nottingham; England
- Coordinates: 52.9493°N 1.17922°W

Other information
- Status: Closed

History
- Original company: Midland Railway

Key dates
- 2 October 1848: Station opened
- 30 June 1911: Station closed
Location

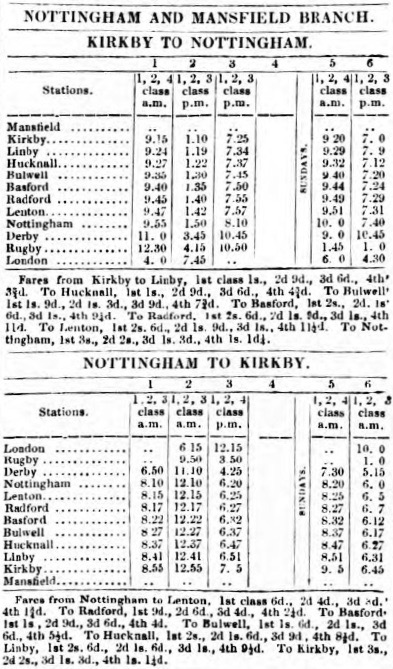
Midland Railway timetable from 1848 showing services between Nottingham and Kirkby

Lenton railway station was situated on the Midland Railway line on Derby Road in Lenton, Nottingham, England.

== History ==
Lenton railway station opened on 2 October 1848 with the partial opening of the Midland Railway's line from Nottingham to Mansfield as far as Kirkby. Three passenger trains a day in each direction were provided from Monday to Saturday with two on Sundays. The fare from Nottingham to Lenton was 6d. in first class, 4d in second class, 3d in third class and 1.75d in 4th class.

The station was built on Derby Road in Lenton. Originally the road crossed the railway on a level crossing, but by 1886 Nottingham Council were pushing forwards with improvements in the form of a minor diversion of the road over a bridge over the railway. This scheme cost £2,000 (equivalent to £281,400 in 2023).

Being close to the city the station suffered a reduction in passenger numbers when the extension to Nottingham Corporation Tramways service to and from Lenton started on 30 September 1902. The tramway ran along Derby Road, right outside the station.

The Midland Railway closed the station to passengers on 30 June 1911.

The bridge on Derby Road over the railway was widened from 40 feet (12 m) to 60 feet (18 m) by the London, Midland and Scottish Railway company in 1931.

== Stationmasters ==
The stationmaster position was in existence until 1908 when it was dispensed with.

- J. Ward ca. 1857 - 1873
- J. Bancroft 1873 - 1880 (formerly station master at Chinley)
- Edward Wain 1881 - 1890 (afterwards station master at Rotherham Westgate)
- T.W. Coltman 1890 - 1893 (formerly station master at Lazonby and Kirkoswald, afterwards station master at Colne)
- Charles Smith 1893 - 1907 (formerly station master at Carlton, afterwards station master at Wingfield)
- William Porter 1907 - 1908 (also station master at Radford)

Preceding station	Historical railways	Following station
Nottingham; Line open, station open	Midland Railway; Nottingham to Mansfield line	Radford; Line open, station closed
