= Whitwell railway station =

Railway station in Derbyshire, England

Coordinates: 53°16′48″N 1°12′02″W

Whitwell
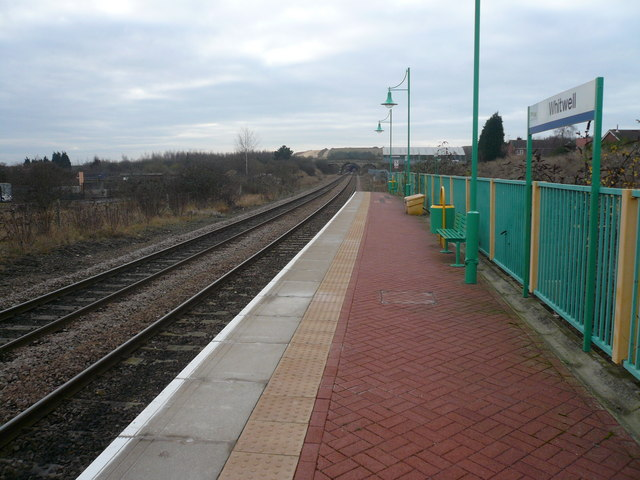

General information
- Location: Whitwell, Bolsover; England
- Grid reference: SK534761
- Manager: East Midlands Railway
- Platforms: 2

Other information
- Station code: WWL
- Classification: DfT category F2

History
- Opened: 1 June 1875
- Original company: Midland Railway
- Post-grouping: London, Midland and Scottish Railway

Key dates
- 1 June 1875: Opened
- October 1964: Closed
- 1998: Reopened

Passengers
- 2021/22: ▲13,572
- 2022/23: ▼12,790
- 2023/24: ▼10,426
- 2024/25: ▲10,686
- 2025/26: ▲11,438
Location
Notes
- Passenger statistics from the Office of Rail and Road

Whitwell railway station serves the village of Whitwell in Derbyshire, England. The station is on the Robin Hood Line 4¾ miles (7 km) south west of Worksop towards Nottingham.

== History ==
The line and station were built by the Midland Railway. The station was designed by the Midland Railway company architect John Holloway Sanders. They were opened for passenger traffic on 1 June 1875. When the line opened two railway companies provided services through Whitwell:

- The Midland Railway (MR) ran three trains a day from Mansfield through Whitwell, which then turned right at Woodend Junction to Worksop, as all Robin Hood Line trains do now. They then continued on to Retford.
- The Manchester, Sheffield and Lincolnshire Railway (MSLR) ran three daily trains from Mansfield through Whitwell which turned left at Woodend Junction to Shireoaks then several stops to their station in Sheffield, later to be renamed Sheffield Victoria.

Over time the direct Mansfield-Whitwell-Sheffield service was diverted to Worksop. From 1 October 1905, the MR took over all services and ran them all to Worksop, where passengers for Sheffield could change trains. This core service continued until closure for passenger traffic in October 1964, though freight traffic continued. The station was dismantled and rebuilt, brick by brick, at the heritage railway at Butterley in 1981.

The line reopened in stages through the 1990s, with the final, northernmost, section from Mansfield Woodhouse through Whitwell to Worksop reopening in 1998. The modern Whitwell station is on the original site, but a wholly new structure.

== The station ==
The station is located on the edge of the village, beside the quarry. It consists of two platforms, with the Nottingham-bound one having to be reached via a footbridge.

== Services ==
All services at Whitwell are operated by East Midlands Railway.

On weekdays and Saturdays, the station is generally served by a train every two hours northbound to Worksop and southbound to Nottingham via Mansfield Woodhouse.

There is currently no Sunday service at the station since the previous service of four trains per day was withdrawn in 2011. Sunday services at the station are due to recommence at the station during the life of the East Midlands franchise.

Preceding station	National Rail	Following station
Creswell	East Midlands Railway: Robin Hood Line; Monday–Saturday only	Worksop
	Disused railways	
Creswell Line and station open	Manchester, Sheffield and Lincolnshire Railway Worksop to Sheffield (1875–1905)	Shireoaks Line closed, station open
