= Unstone railway station =

Former railway station in Derbyshire, England

Coordinates: 53°17′24″N 1°26′34″W

Unstone

General information
- Location: Unstone, District of North East Derbyshire; England
- Platforms: 2

Other information
- Status: Disused

History
- Original company: Midland Railway
- Post-grouping: London, Midland and Scottish Railway

Key dates
- 1 February 1870: Station opens as Unston
- 1 July 1908: renamed Unstone
- 29 October 1951: Station closed for passengers
- 1961: closed for goods
Location

Unstone railway station was a station in Derbyshire, England.

It was built by the Midland Railway in 1870 and was designed by the company architect John Holloway Sanders.

It was on what is known to railwaymen as the "New Road" to Sheffield. This bypassed the North Midland Railway's original line, which had avoided Sheffield due to the gradients involved, and came to be known as the "Old Road".

Originally called Unston, until 1908 when the "e" was added. It had timber buildings without canopies. It closed to passengers in 1951 and for goods services in 1961.

From Unstone, the line continued the long 1 in 100 climb to Dronfield.

Preceding station	Historical railways	Following station
Sheepbridge; Line open, station closed	Midland Railway; Midland Main Line	Dronfield; Line and station open
