= Poolsbrook Country Park =

Country park in Staveley, Derbyshire, England

- Interactive map of Poolsbrook Country Park
- Type: public and industrial heritage park
- Location: Staveley, Derbyshire, England
- Coordinates: 53.2600°N 1.34900°W
- Area: 165 hectares (410 acres)

Poolsbrook Country Park is a park in Poolsbrook, Chesterfield, England.

== History ==
It was the site of the former Colliery. It has been transformed from dereliction into a country park and amenities area.

The cafe is run by Friends of Poolsbrook Country Park, a group of local volunteers giving their free time to build the community spirit in the park.

Since the beginning of 2008, the park has been partly occupied by the Caravan Club, who have built a camp site with eco-friendly facilities.

The site adjoins the Trans Pennine Trail.

== Events ==
A Parkrun takes place in the park every Saturday morning.
