= Heath railway station =

Former railway station in Derbyshire, England

Coordinates: 53°11′26.9″N 1°20′59″W

Heath
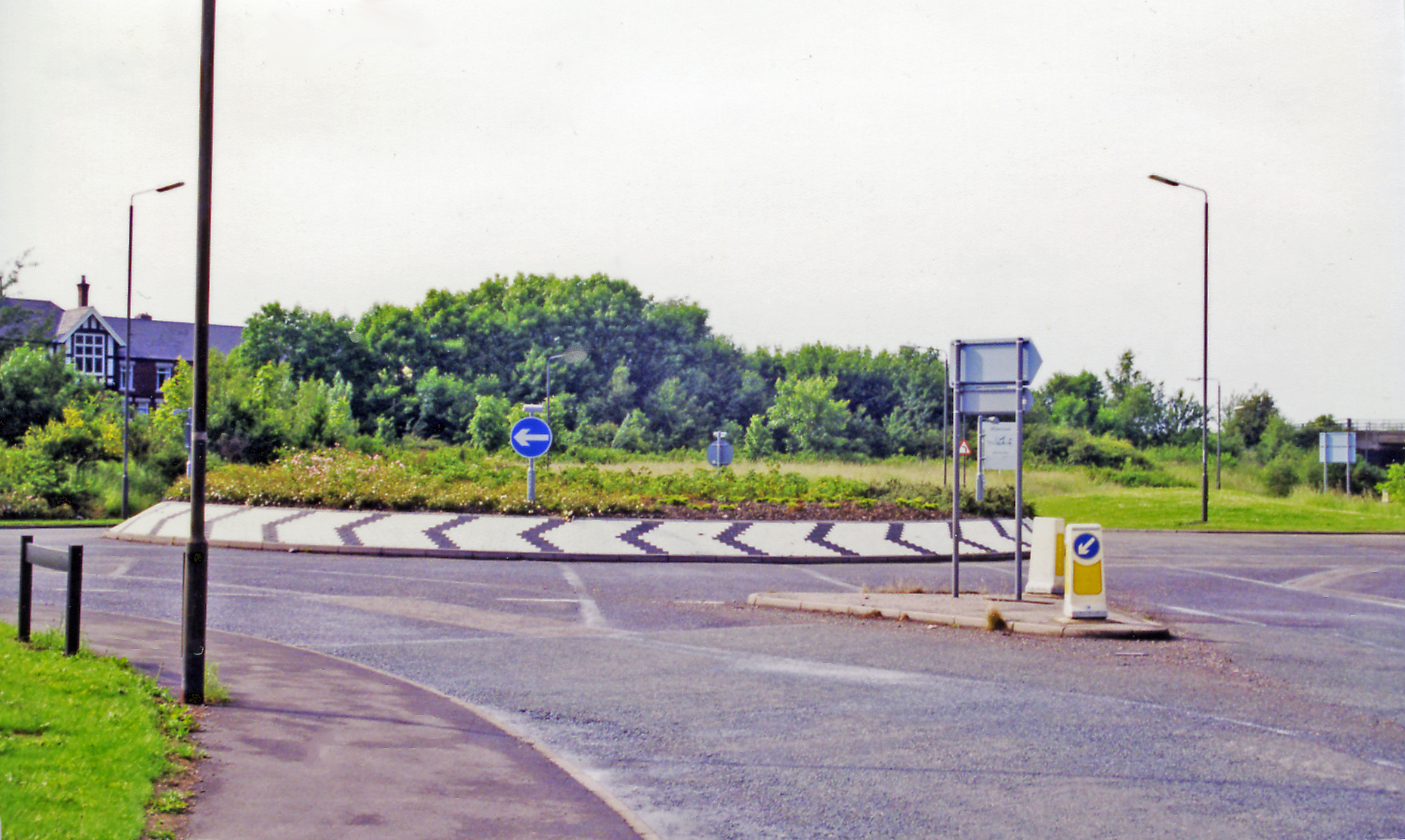

General information
- Location: Holmewood, Derbyshire, England
- Platforms: 2

Other information
- Status: Disused

History
- Original company: Manchester, Sheffield and Lincolnshire Railway
- Pre-grouping: Great Central Railway
- Post-grouping: London and North Eastern Railway

Key dates
- 2 January 1893: Opened
- 4 March 1963: Closed for passengers
- 14 June 1965: closed for freight
Location

Heath railway station was a railway station in the village of Holmewood, Derbyshire. The station name of Heath was named after the neighbouring village of Heath although the station was in Holmewood instead.

The station was just before the Great Central Chesterfield Loop which ran between Staveley Central and Heath Junction (just north of Heath railway station) on the Great Central Main Line.

Preceding station	Disused railways	Following station
Staveley Central	Great Central Railway; Derbyshire Lines	Pilsley
Grassmoor	Great Central Railway; Derbyshire Lines	Pilsley
