= Radford railway station =

Former railway station in Nottinghamshire, England

Radford
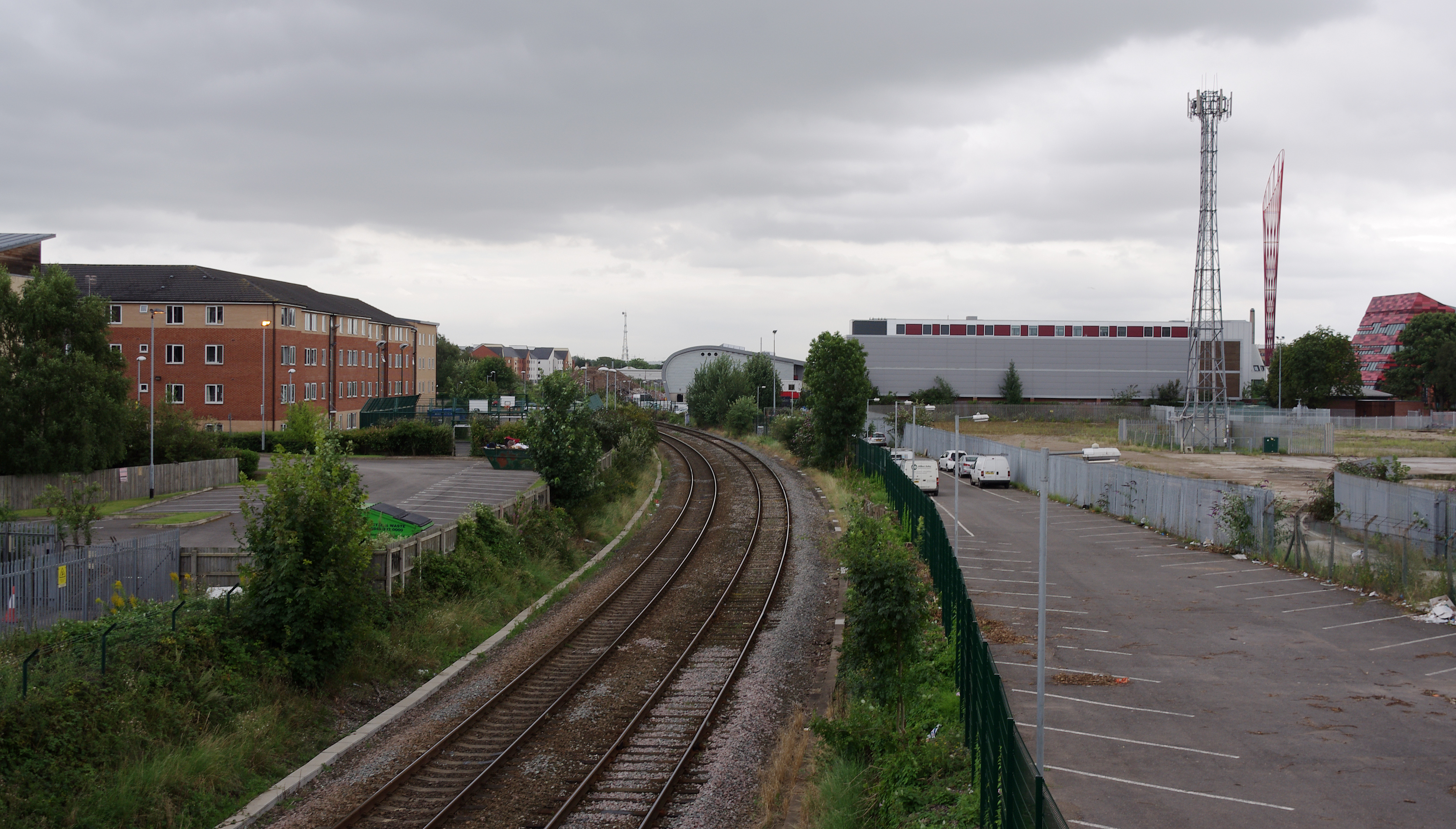
- The site of the station in 2012

General information
- Location: Radford, Nottingham; England
- Coordinates: 52.9563°N 1.1845°W

Other information
- Status: Disused

History
- Original company: Midland Railway

Key dates
- 2 October 1848: Station opened
- 12 October 1964: Station closed
Location

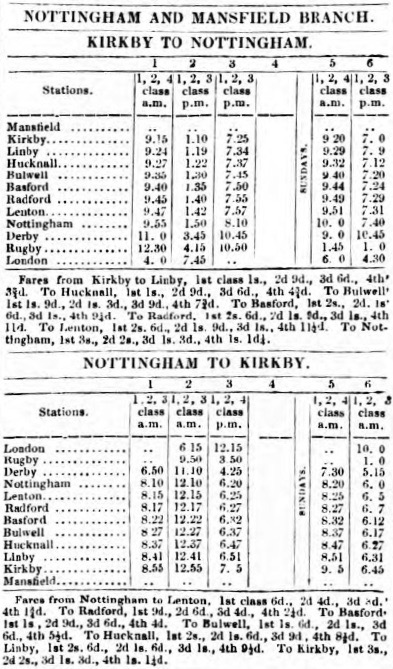
Midland Railway timetable from 1848 showing services between Nottingham and Kirkby

Radford railway station was on the Midland Main Line and Robin Hood Line in Radford, Nottingham.

== History ==
It was opened by the Midland Railway on 2 October 1848. Three passenger trains a day in each direction were provided from Monday to Saturday, with two on Sundays. The fare from Nottingham to Radford was 9d. for first class (equivalent to £3.86 in 2025), 6d for second class (equivalent to £2.57 in 2025), and 4d for third class (equivalent to £1.71 in 2025).

In 1870, the Midland Railway approved the construction of the Radford to Trowell line, which started at a junction just north of Radford station. Along with the Ambergate to Codnor Park line constructed at the same time, its purpose was to route Lancashire freight traffic via Nottingham, to avoid the bottleneck of Derby.

The line was nearly 5 miles (8 km) in length and the contractor was Messrs Eckersley and Bayliss of Derby. Some labour force problems delayed completion of the line until 1874. It was formally opened on 1 May 1875. and also served Wollaton Colliery and later Trowell Moor Colliery.

The station was closed on 12 October 1964. No trace of it remains beyond different coloured brickwork on the A609 road bridge where steps went down to the platform, and some windows which can be seen from the Jubilee Campus of the University of Nottingham

== Stationmasters ==
- Mr. Watson ca. 1852 and ca. 1857
- William Porter ca. 1859 - 1908 (Formerly stationmaster at Teversall. Also stationmaster at Lenton from 1907)
- S. Eaton until 1911 (afterwards stationmaster at Lowdham)
- J. Davies 1911 - 1922 (also stationmaster of Basford and Bulwell, afterwards stationmaster at Bath)
- S.J. Whitehead 1922 - ???? (also stationmaster of Basford and Bulwell)
- P. Marshall ???? - 1938
- W.A.J. Slater 1937 - ???? (formerly signalman at Cudworth)

Preceding station	Historical railways	Following station
Lenton; Line open, station closed	Midland Railway; Nottingham to Mansfield line	Basford; Line open, station closed
Lenton; Line open, station closed	Midland Railway; Radford to Trowell line	Trowell; Line open, station closed
