= Dronfield railway station =

Railway station in Derbyshire, England

Coordinates: 53°18′4.6″N 1°28′8.2″W

Dronfield
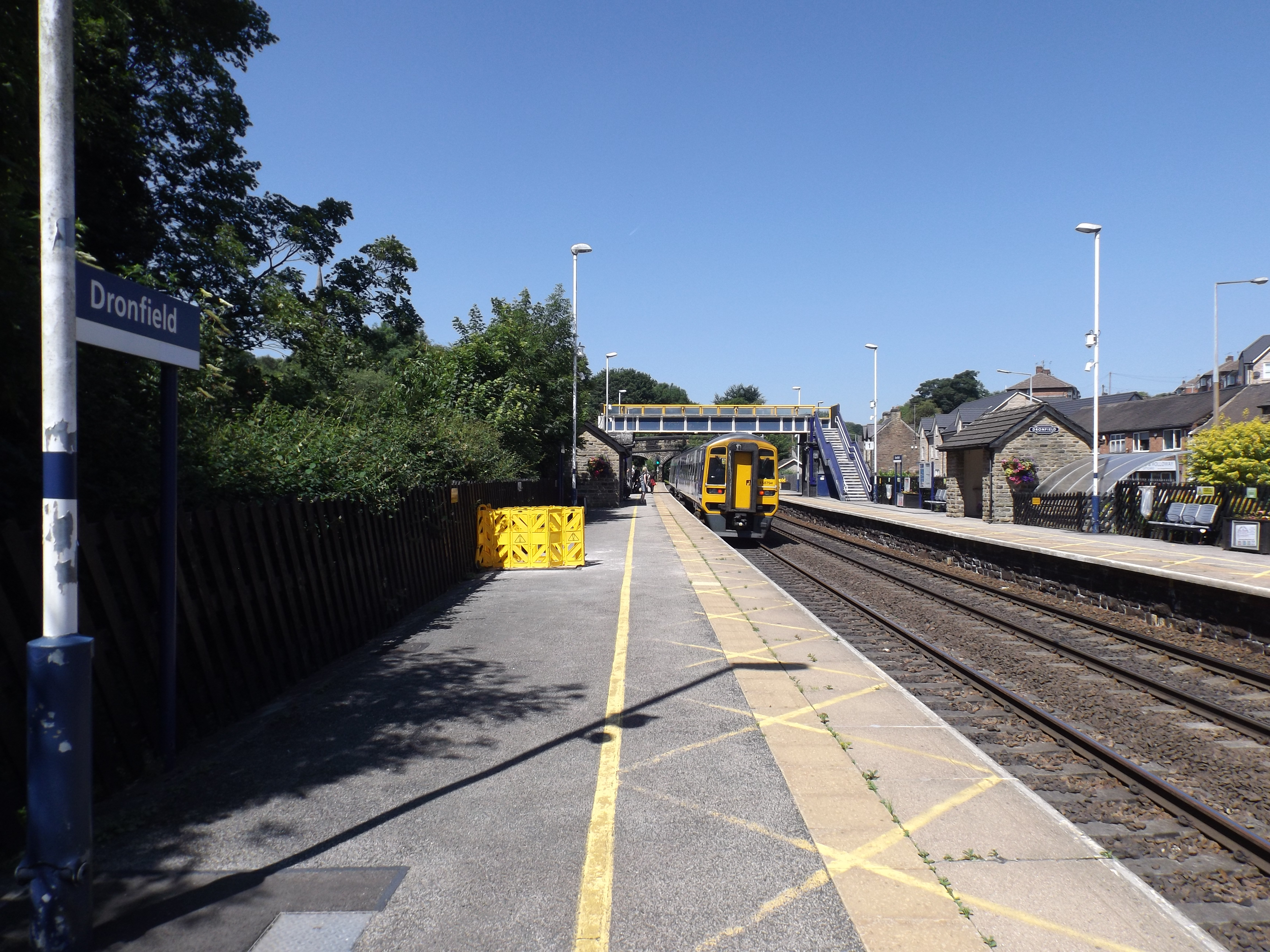

General information
- Location: Dronfield, North East Derbyshire; England
- Grid reference: SK354784
- Managed by: Northern Trains
- Platforms: 2

Other information
- Station code: DRO
- Classification: DfT category F2

History
- Original company: Midland Railway
- Post-grouping: London Midland and Scottish Railway

Key dates
- 2 February 1870: Opened
- 2 January 1967: Closed
- 15 February 1979: Re-opened
- 19 February 1979: Closed
- 5 January 1981: Re-opened

Passengers
- 2020/21: ▼31,470
- 2021/22: ▲0.137 million
- 2022/23: ▲0.162 million
- 2023/24: ▲0.189 million
- 2024/25: ▲0.230 million
Location
Notes
- Passenger statistics from the Office of Rail and Road

Dronfield railway station serves the town of Dronfield in Derbyshire, England, south of Sheffield, on the Midland Main Line between Chesterfield and Sheffield.

== History ==
Construction of the Sheffield and Chesterfield line was authorised by the Midland Railway (Chesterfield to Sheffield) Act 1864 (27 & 28 Vict. c. ccxxx) but it was not until Monday 2 February 1870 that the line and Dronfield station were opened to traffic. It was designed by the Midland Railway company architect John Holloway Sanders.

The line was known as the "New Road" to differentiate from the "Old Road" built by the North Midland Railway, which took an easier route along the Rother Valley and bypassed Sheffield. The station is on the long climb up the Drone valley to Bradway Tunnel at the point where the gradient steepens from 1 in 201 to 1 in 102.

The station had single storey wooden buildings on both platforms. The main buildings, including booking office and staff offices, were on the "up" platform. The smaller building on the other platform contained a waiting room and a ladies' waiting room.

To the south of the passenger station, on the land now used as a car park, was the goods station with a brick-built warehouse and several sidings.

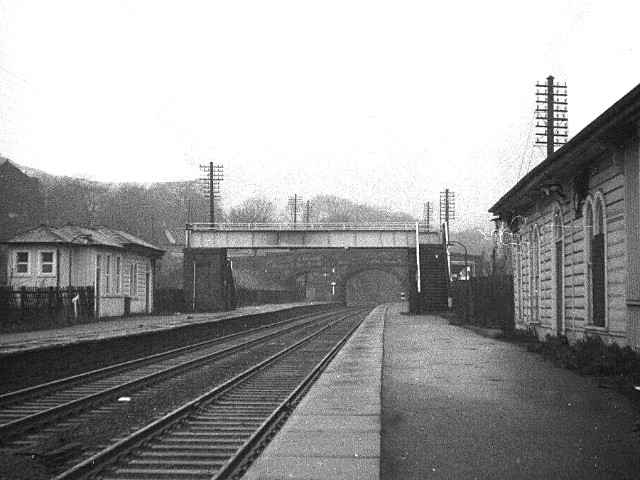
The original Midland Railway station buildings were still standing at the centenary. 1 February 1970

The station was closed to passengers with effect from Monday 2 January 1967, the last passenger train to call being the 21:41 Sheffield - Derby service on Saturday 31 December 1966. The station remained staffed for two years after closure until the goods station closed. The buildings were demolished in June 1973 but the platforms remained.

Between 15 and 19 February 1979, British Rail temporarily reopened the station (along with Wadsley Bridge and the Midland Main Line platforms at Dore) because road transport throughout Sheffield had been brought to a standstill by heavy snowfall. Many trains on the Midland Main Line served the station during that period, and special single fares of 20p were charged to both Chesterfield and Sheffield. Demand for the special services was so high on Friday 16 February that "passengers [travelling to] Sheffield were queueing on the station approach — the platforms being completely full". The station then reopened permanently to passengers on 5 January 1981 with a limited service at peak periods only.

The station is managed by Northern. However, until 14 December 2008 no Northern services stopped there. A residents' pressure group, Friends of Dronfield Station, successfully campaigned for rail services to the town to be improved and continue to beautify the station and press for better facilities.

== Service ==
Since 14 December 2008, Northern has run an hourly service from Leeds to Nottingham. Most of these services call at Dronfield, connecting the station with Sheffield, Meadowhall Interchange, Barnsley, Wakefield Kirkgate and Leeds to the north, as well as Chesterfield, Alfreton, Langley Mill and Nottingham to the south.

East Midlands Railway and CrossCountry trains also use the line between Sheffield and Chesterfield. However, with the exception of a few peak-time Liverpool - Norwich trains, they pass through Dronfield without stopping. Passengers from Dronfield wishing to use these services must therefore change trains at Sheffield or Chesterfield.

Preceding station	National Rail	Following station
Chesterfield	Northern Trains Nottingham-Leeds	Sheffield
Chesterfield	East Midlands Railway Norwich-Liverpool (Limited Service)	Sheffield
	Historical railways	
Unstone; Line open, station closed	Midland Railway; Midland Main Line	Dore & Totley; Line and station open
