= Staveley Central railway station =

Former railway station in Derbyshire, England

Staveley Central
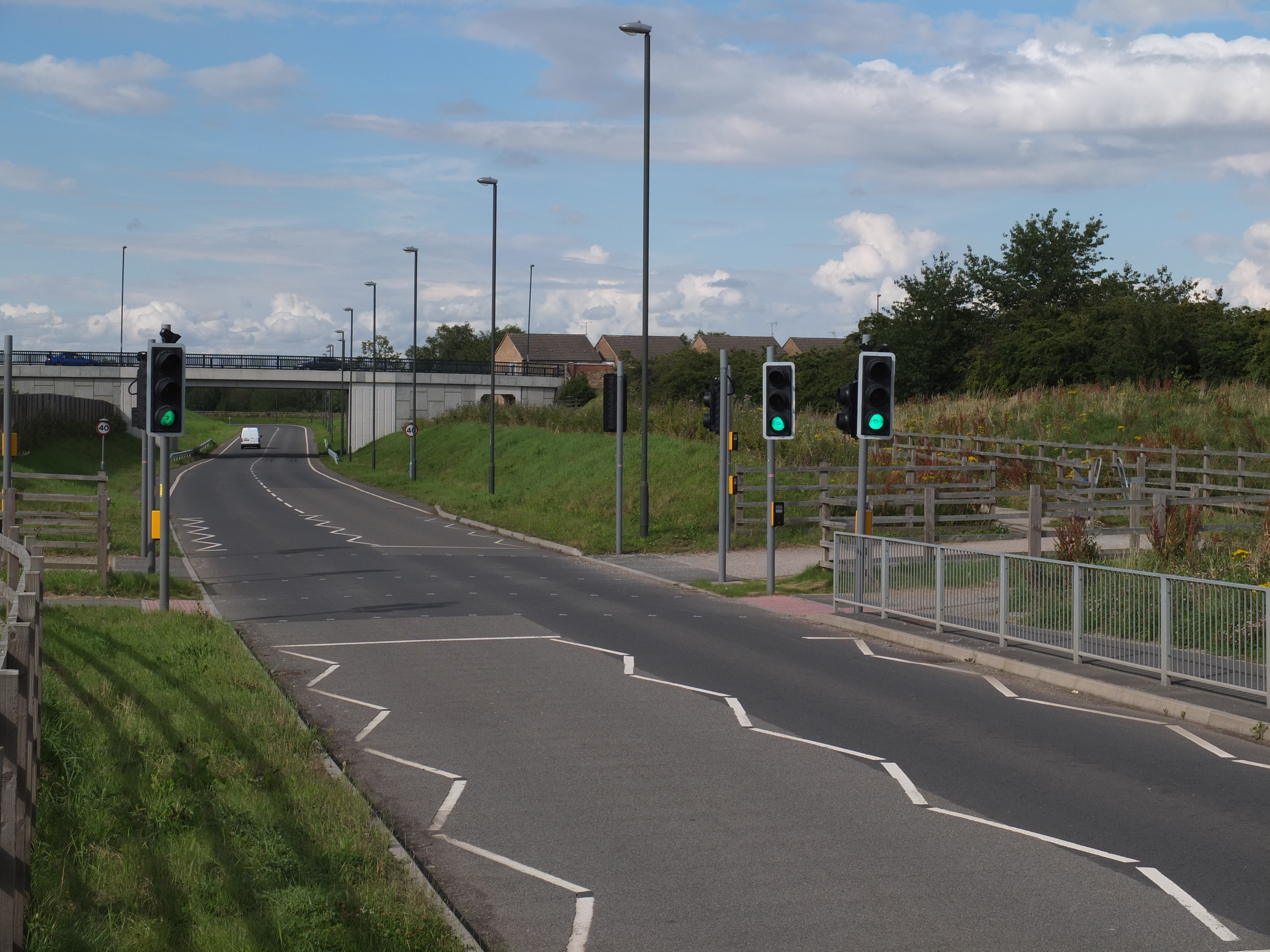
- The former station site; Ireland Way now runs along the site of the platforms and part of the Trans-Pennine Trail follows the former trackbed

General information
- Location: Staveley, Chesterfield, England
- Coordinates: 53.27000°N 1.34667°W
- Grid reference: SK435749
- Platforms: 4

Other information
- Status: Disused

History
- Original company: MS&LR
- Pre-grouping: Great Central Railway
- Post-grouping: London and North Eastern Railway; London Midland Region of British Railways

Key dates
- 1 June 1892: Opened (Staveley Town)
- 25 September 1950: Renamed (Staveley Central)
- 4 March 1963: Closed to regular passenger traffic
- 1964: Closed to all passenger traffic
- 14 June 1965: Closed for freight
Location

Staveley Central was a railway station that served the town of Staveley, in Derbyshire, England, between 1892 and 1965.

== History ==
The station was a stop on the Great Central Main Line which connected between London Marylebone and Manchester London Road, via Sheffield Victoria. It was opened on 1 June 1892 as Staveley Town and was renamed Staveley Central on 25 September 1950 by British Railways to reduce confusion with the former Midland Railway (MR) station; this was also called Staveley Town, which was about 250 yards away on the same street. The latter station was on the Barrow Hill to Clowne and to Pleasley West lines. The renaming also reduced the likelihood of people confusing the station with that at Barrow Hill and Staveley Works, which was officially renamed Barrow Hill on 18 June 1951 to further differentiate the stations.

Staveley Central was closed on 4 March 1963, but continued to serve summer weekend excursion traffic until the end of the 1964 season.

The station was the northern junction for the loop line to Chesterfield Central and so had four platforms. The timber-built booking hall was on the Lowgates road overbridge and there was a waiting room on each platform. The station was also the junction for branches to the Ireland, Hartington and Markham collieries and at the south end was Staveley (Great Central) engine shed. (Note: Shed code 38D and latterly 41H in BR days.) This, too, was subject to confusion with the former-MR "Staveley" engine shed over a mile away at Barrow Hill. (Note: Coded 18D.) The former-GC engine shed at Staveley has been demolished, but the former-MR Barrow Hill engine shed survives as a railway engineering and preservation site.

== The site today ==
The site now forms part of a road linking to the M1 motorway junction 29A.

== Other Staveley stations ==
Three other stations have had Staveley in their name at some point in their history:

- Staveley Town, a Midland Railway station on another line about 250 yards away on the same street.
- Barrow Hill: named Staveley in its early years
- Staveley Works: the next station on from Staveley Central towards Chesterfield Central and Sheffield Victoria.
