= Chesterfield railway station =

Railway station in Derbyshire, England

Coordinates: 53°14′17.6″N 1°25′11″W

Chesterfield
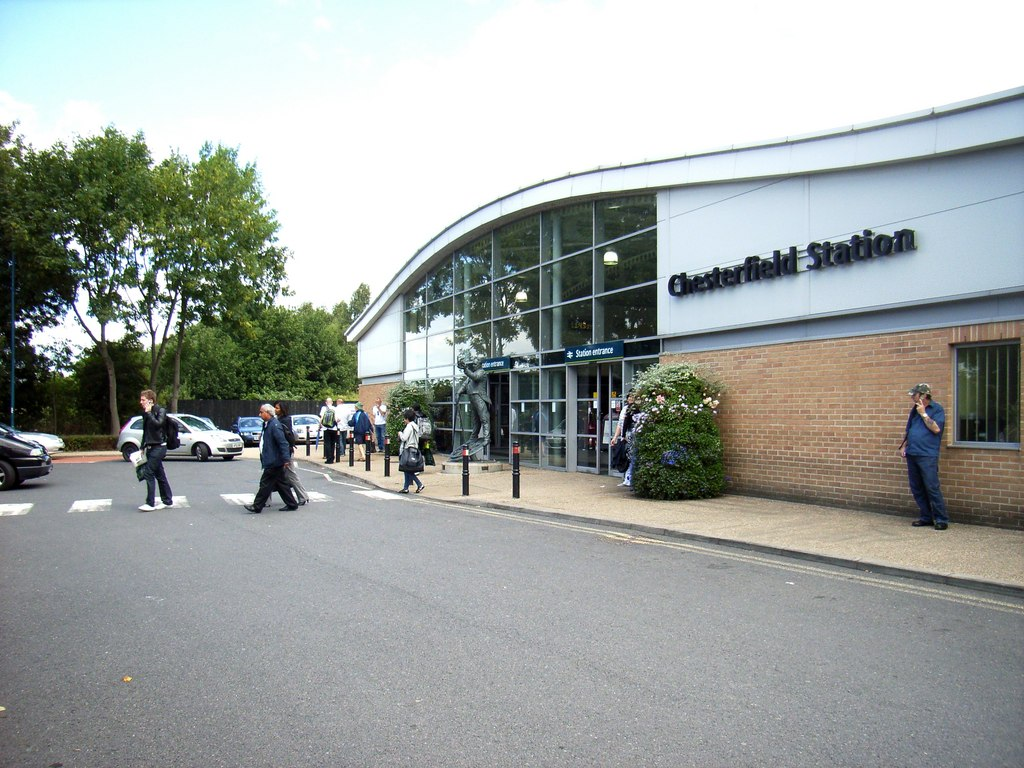
- Chesterfield railway station entrance

General information
- Location: Chesterfield, Borough of Chesterfield; England
- Grid reference: SK388714
- Managed by: East Midlands Railway
- Platforms: 3
- Tracks: 4

Other information
- Station code: CHD
- Classification: DfT category C1

History
- Original company: North Midland Railway
- Pre-grouping: Midland Railway
- Post-grouping: London, Midland and Scottish Railway

Key dates
- 11 May 1840: Original station opened
- 2 May 1870: Resited
- 25 September 1950: Renamed Chesterfield St Mary's
- 18 June 1951: Renamed Chesterfield Midland
- 7 September 1964: Renamed Chesterfield

Passengers
- 2020/21: ▼0.323 million
- Interchange: ▼44,543
- 2021/22: ▲1.205 million
- Interchange: ▲0.172 million
- 2022/23: ▲1.450 million
- Interchange: ▼0.165 million
- 2023/24: ▲1.543 million
- Interchange: ▲0.168 million
- 2024/25: ▲1.821 million
- Interchange: ▲0.175 million
Location
Notes
- Passenger statistics from the Office of Rail and Road

Chesterfield railway station serves the market town of Chesterfield in Derbyshire, England. It is on the Midland Main Line, which connects Sheffield with London St Pancras. Four tracks pass through the station which has three platforms. It is currently operated by East Midlands Railway.

The town was once served by three stations; the others were Chesterfield Central (closed in 1963) and Chesterfield Market Place (closed in 1957).

== History ==
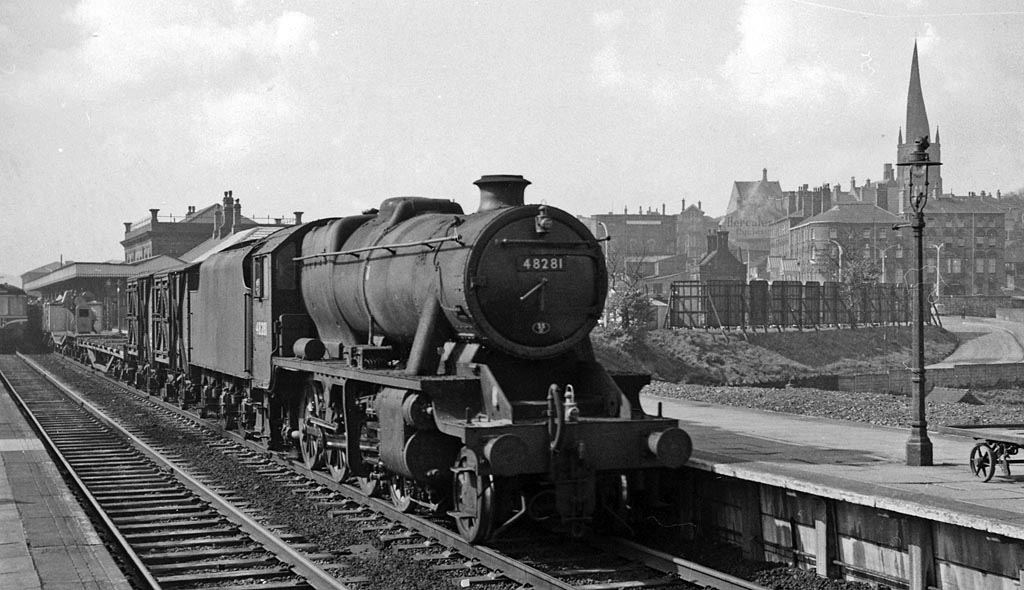
A freight train passing through the station in 1961, with the Crooked Spire in the background

The first line into Chesterfield was the North Midland Railway from Derby to Leeds in 1840. The original station was built in a Jacobean style, similar to the one at Ambergate, but it was replaced in 1870 by a new one further south in the current location, when the Midland Railway built the New Road to Sheffield. This new station of 1870 was designed by the company architect John Holloway Sanders.

In 1892, the Manchester, Sheffield and Lincolnshire Railway, later to become the Great Central Railway, crossed under the North Midland line 0.5 miles (800 m) south at Horns Bridge to Chesterfield Central station 200 yards west of this station. In 1897, the Lancashire, Derbyshire and East Coast Railway arrived, crossing both North Midland and Great Central lines at Horns Bridge with a viaduct 700 feet long, leading to Chesterfield Market Place station at West Bars, near the Market Place.

The line into Market Place station closed to passengers in 1951, due to problems in Bolsover Tunnel, although the station remained open for goods traffic until March 1957 when it was closed completely. The station building was demolished in 1972. The Great Central station closed in March 1963 and was demolished in 1973 to make way for the town's inner relief road.

The Midland station was demolished and rebuilt in 1963. Most of the buildings from 1963 were demolished in the late 1990s, shortly after privatisation. The station was extensively rebuilt shortly after Midland Mainline took over its operation from British Rail in 1996.

This station is currently owned by Network Rail but is operated by East Midlands Railway, which operates trains between Sheffield and London St Pancras International. Midland Mainline operated the franchise between 1996 and November 2007. The running of the station was passed to East Midlands Trains, who ran the station for nearly 12 years. Operation then passed to East Midlands Railway.

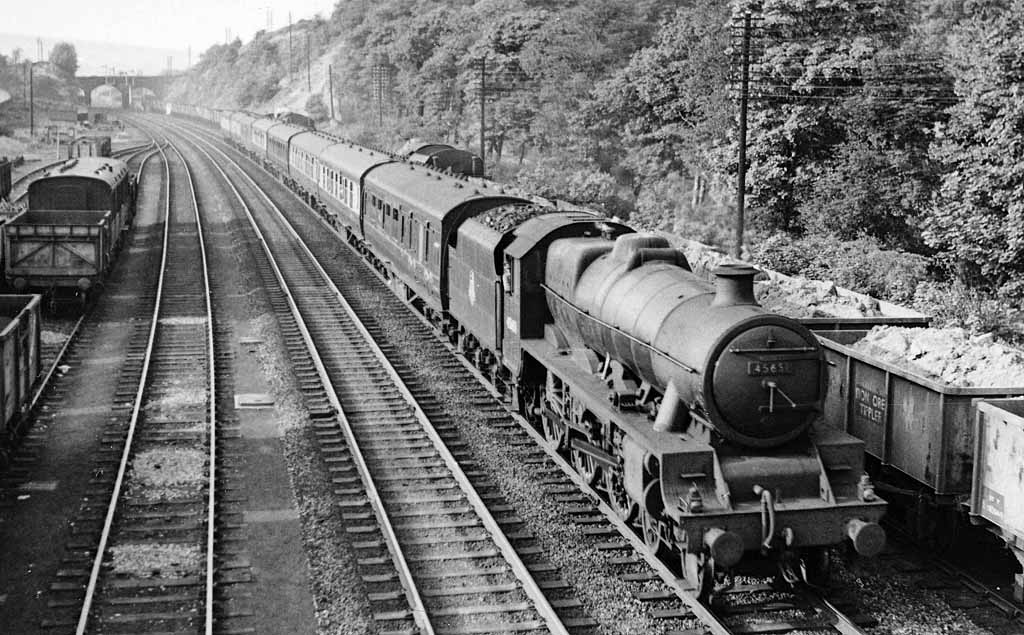
Up express in 1957

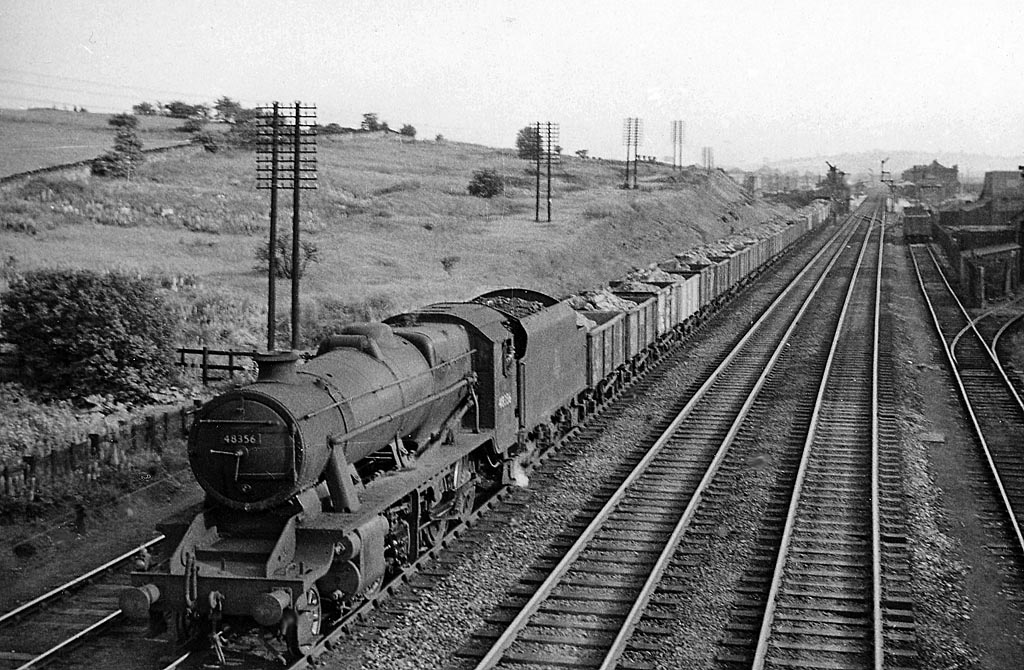
Down iron ore train north of Chesterfield (Midland) in 1957

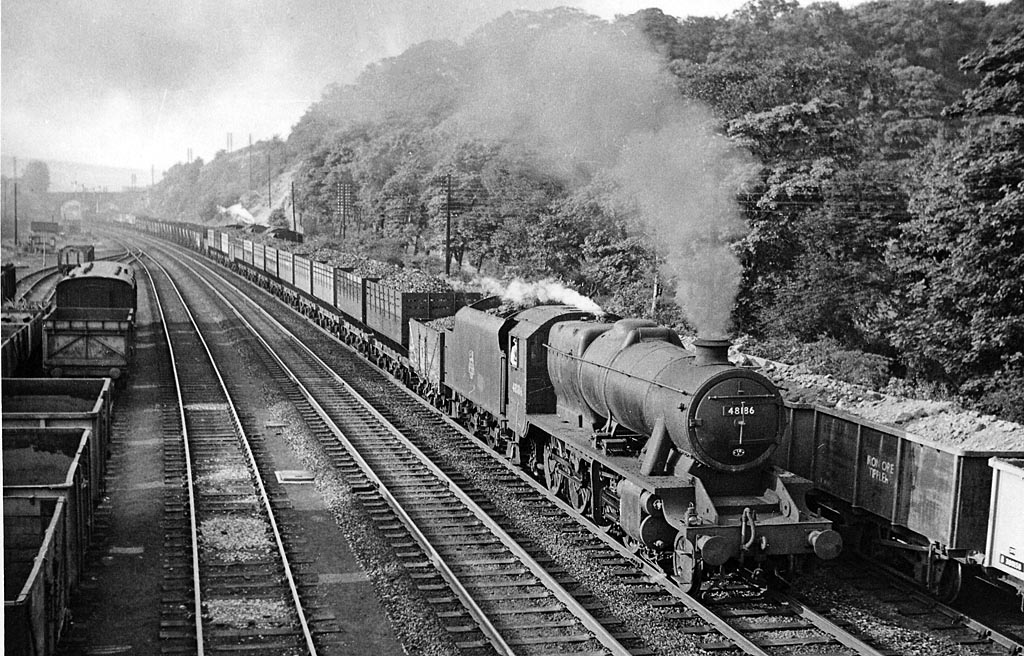
Up coke train approaching Chesterfield (Midland) in 1957

== Facilities ==
Entrance to the station is on Crow Lane and includes a car park, taxi rank and bus stop. There is also a small chargeable car park on the other side of Crow Lane. The main entrance leads to the station concourse, which was built in the late 1990s; it includes a ticket office, a newsagent, a café and a waiting room. The concourse and the waiting room both have direct access to platform 1. There is also a waiting room on platform 2, which is accessed via a tunnel, using the stairs or lift in the concourse.

== Layout ==
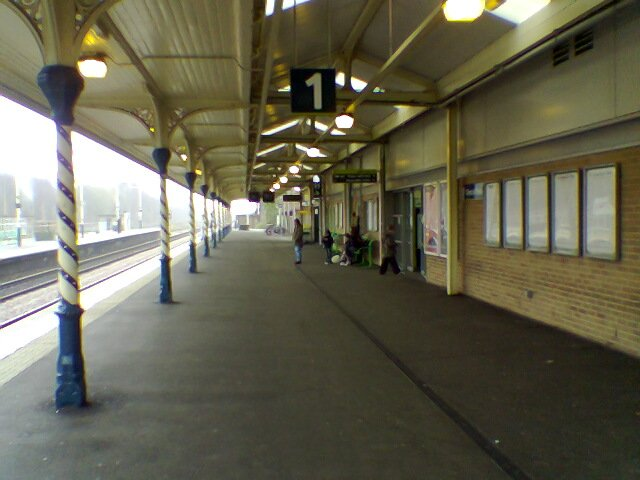
Platform 1, facing south

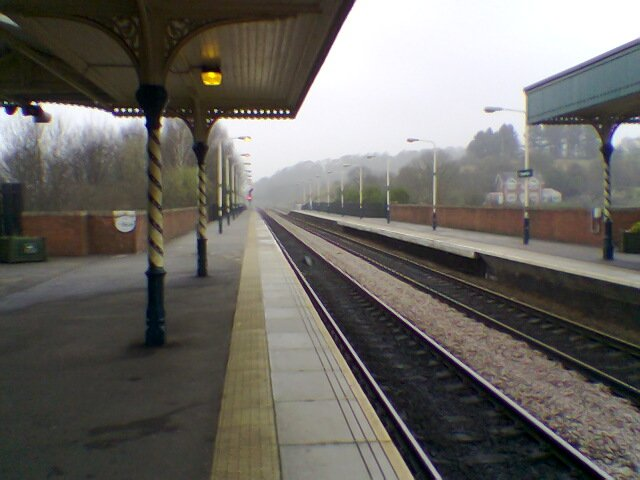
Platform 1, facing north

The fast lines have two large side platforms, one for each direction; these platforms are covered for around half their length. The goods lines pass around the rear of platform 2 and there is a third large platform here that serves the northbound goods line.

- Platform 1 is for northbound trains, calling at stations to Sheffield, Manchester Piccadilly, Manchester Oxford Road, Liverpool Lime Street, Leeds, York, Doncaster, Newcastle, Edinburgh Waverley and Glasgow Central.
- Platform 2 is for southbound trains, calling at stations to London St Pancras International, Derby, Nottingham, Peterborough, Norwich, Cambridge, Leicester, Birmingham, Bristol, Cardiff Central, Bournemouth, Southampton, Plymouth and Penzance.
- Platform 3 is bi-directional and was opened in July 2010. As of May 2015, it is used by some services on the Leeds-Nottingham and Liverpool-Norwich routes at peak periods and during engineering works to reduce dependence on replacement bus services. It is located on the down slow line, backing on to platform 2, and is long enough to accommodate a 10 car train. Platform 3 had existed in a previous incarnation decades earlier, although it was a bay platform.

The building of platform 3 was originally planned for 2007/8 to go with the East Midlands North Erewash resignalling scheme; it would have allowed passenger services to run on the bi-directional down slow line (goods line) from a new Chesterfield South Junction to Tapton Junction during perturbation or engineering work on the fast lines in this area. It would have also facilitated the turn back of trains at Chesterfield during the Bradway Tunnel blockade in 2008/9. Work on the platform actually began in March 2010 and it was completed in July 2010, at a cost of £2.6 million.

== Services ==
A map of East Midlands Railway's inter-city and Connect services, showing the current service pattern each hour

Chesterfield is served by three train operating companies:

- East Midlands Railway operates regular inter-city services on the Midland Main Line between Sheffield and London St Pancras, via Derby and Leicester; this includes the 07:45 southbound departure, the Master Cutler. It also runs a route between Liverpool and Norwich, via Manchester Piccadilly and Nottingham.
- Northern Trains runs an hourly service between Nottingham and Leeds.
- CrossCountry operates a regular service between Sheffield and Derby; trains continue on to a variety of final destinations including Glasgow Central, Edinburgh Waverley, Plymouth, Reading, Southampton Central and Bristol Temple Meads.

There are typically 12 passenger trains per hour passing through the station on weekdays (six in each direction), with ten of those calling.

Preceding station	National Rail	Following station
Derby	CrossCountry Reading-Newcastle Peak Hours only	Sheffield
Derby	CrossCountry Cross Country Route	Sheffield
Alfreton	East Midlands Railway Liverpool-Norwich	Sheffield
Alfreton	East Midlands Railway Liverpool-Norwich	Dronfield Limited Service
Derby	East Midlands Railway Midland Main Line	Sheffield
Belper Limited Service	East Midlands Railway Midland Main Line	Sheffield
Alfreton	Northern Trains Nottingham-Leeds	Dronfield
	Future services	
Dronfield	Northern Connect; Bradford Interchange - Nottingham	Alfreton
	Historical railways	
Clay Cross; Line open, station closed	Midland Railway; Midland Main Line	Sheepbridge; Line open, station closed
Clay Cross; Line open, station closed	Midland Railway; Midland Main Line	Whittington; Line open, station closed

== In popular culture ==
A pivotal scene in Frederick Forsyth's novel The Fourth Protocol took place at Chesterfield railway station, including on the station platform and ensuing action on nearby streets.

== High Speed 2 ==
High Speed 2 trains were planned to serve Chesterfield. A branch off the eastern section of the HS2 line south of Chesterfield would have routed via the M1 running parallel to HS2, allowing trains to continue to and through Chesterfield to Sheffield Midland station. On 17 July 2017, the government confirmed a stop at Chesterfield after approval of the M18/Eastern Route. However, a further alteration to the HS2 plan in November 2021 said that HS2 would no longer go via Chesterfield, Sheffield and Leeds.
