= Beighton Junction =

Set of railway junctions in northern England

Coordinates: 53°20′39.5″N 1°19′40.2″W

Beighton Junction is a set of railway junctions near Beighton on the border between Derbyshire and South Yorkshire, England.

== Scope ==
The term Beighton Junction has been used in a narrow sense to encompass either one, two or three junctions, according to author's purposes, or even as a shorthand for Beighton Junction Signalbox.

The narrowest possible scope concerns the original Beighton Junction, which, essentially, stands today, i.e.:

- the single, core junction of a pair of lines east from Sheffield and a pair south from Rotherham. This has been constant from 1849, referred to hereafter as Beighton Junction 1849.

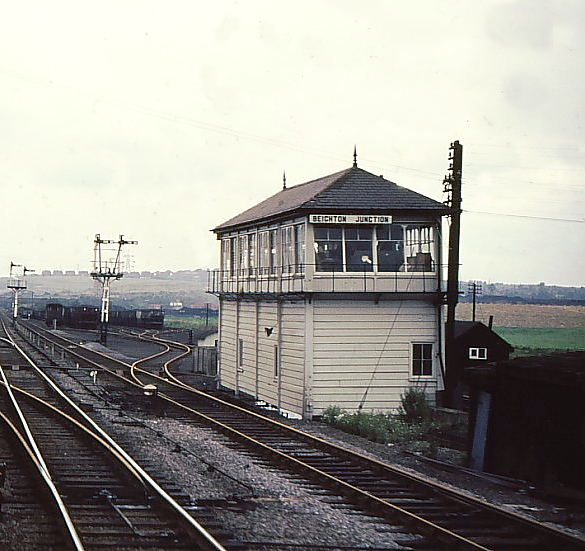
Beighton Junction Signalbox in 1970

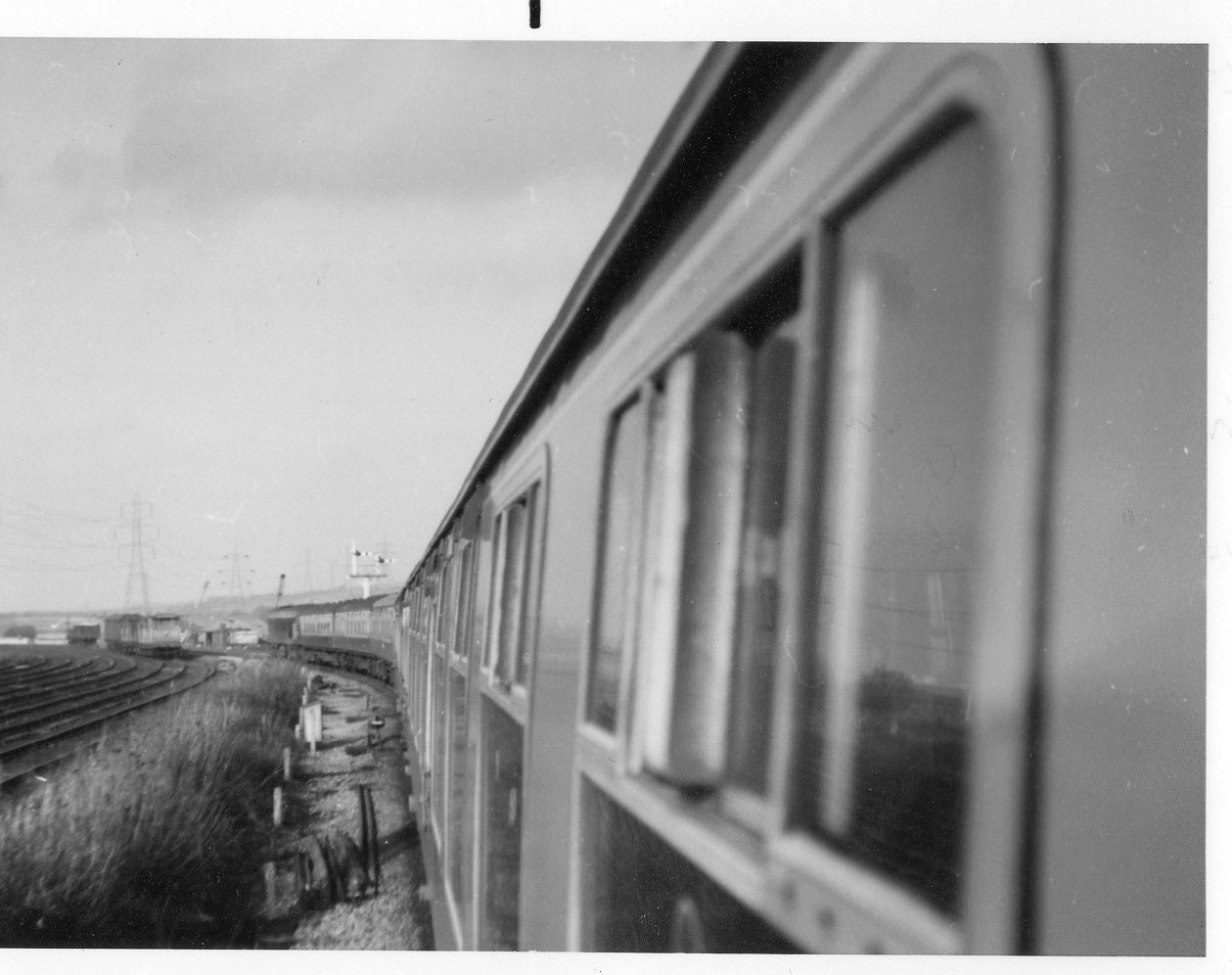
"Beighton Junction 1849" in 1977

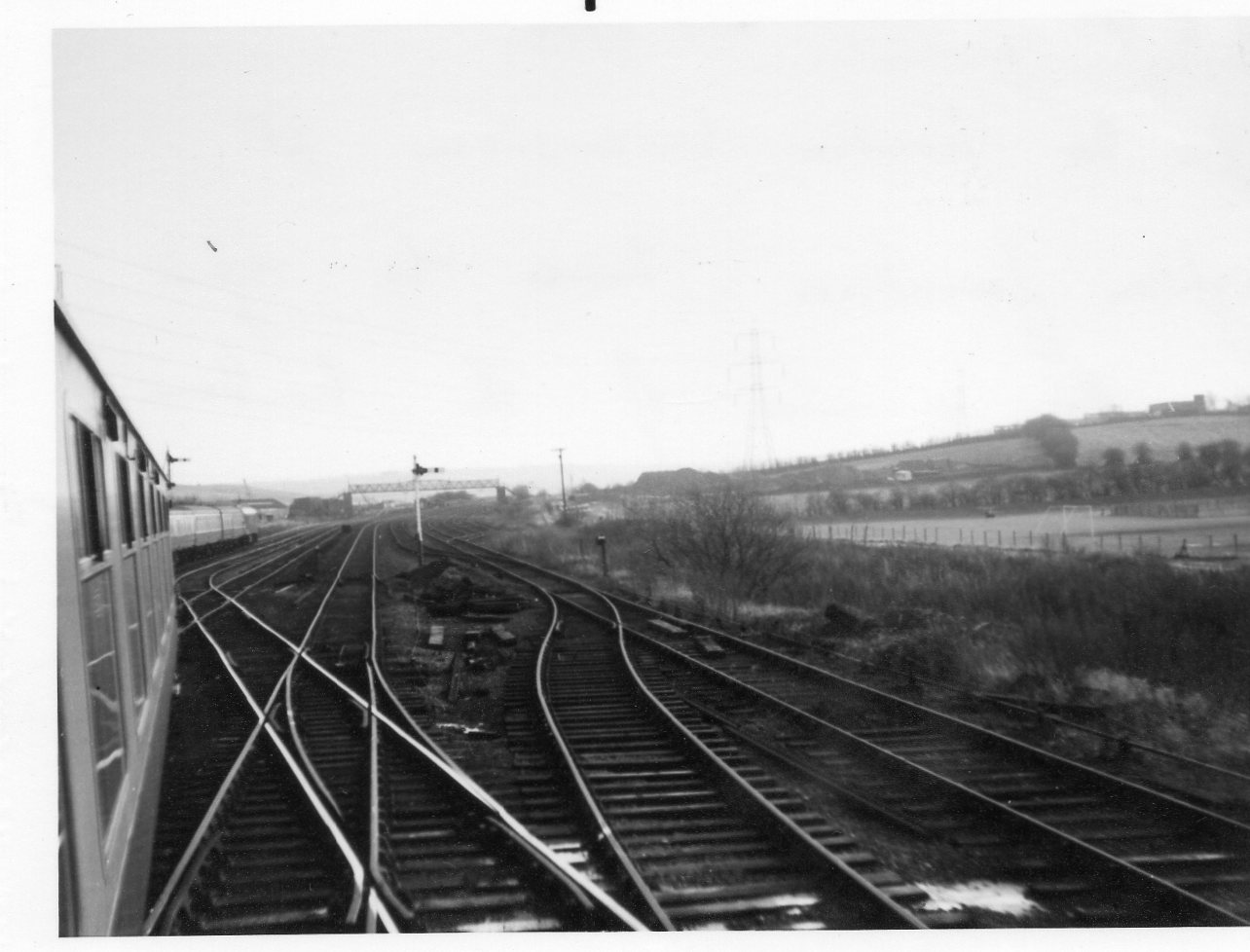
"Beighton Junction 1891" in 1977, southbound

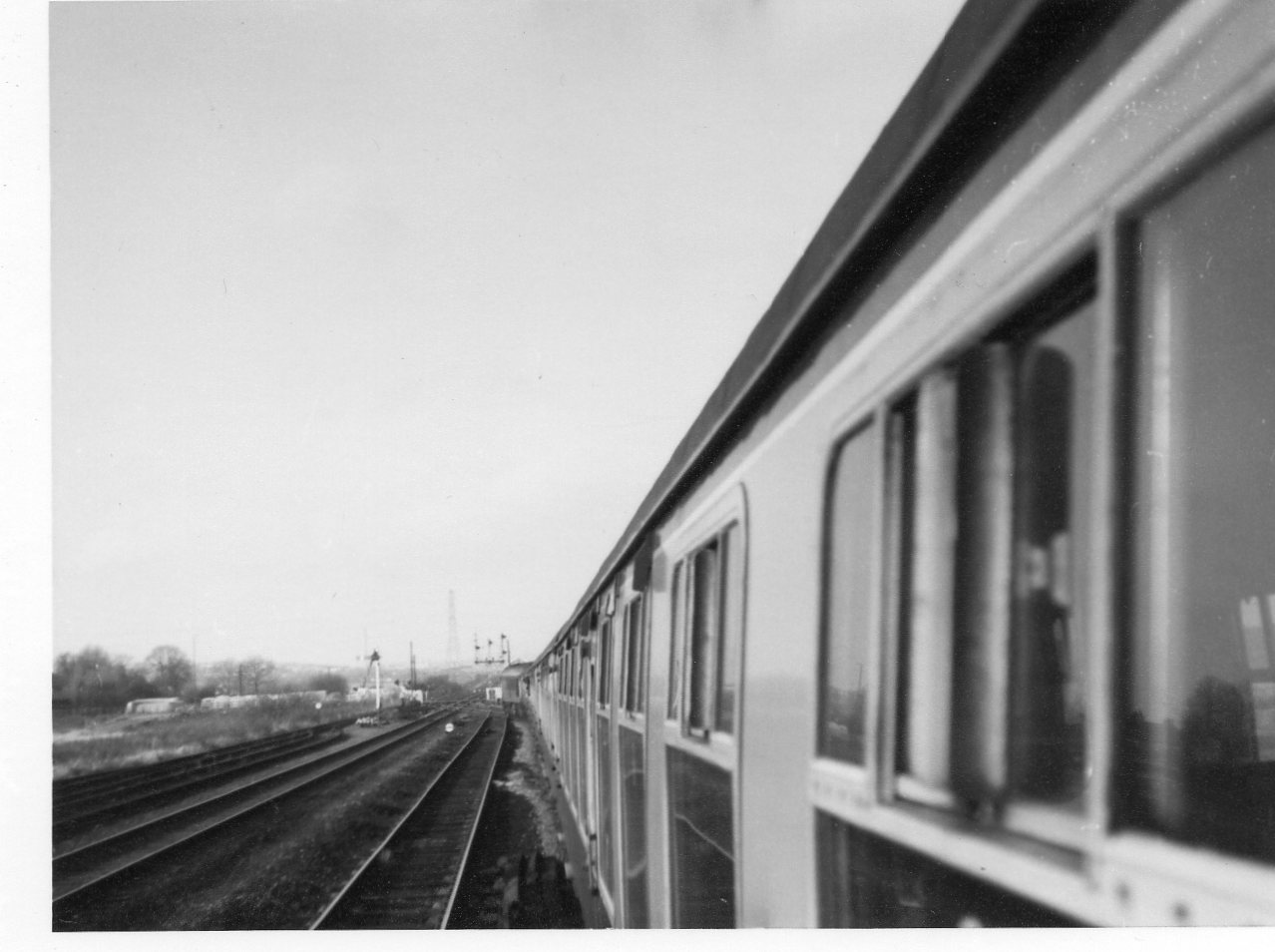
"Beighton Junction 1891" in 1977, northbound1

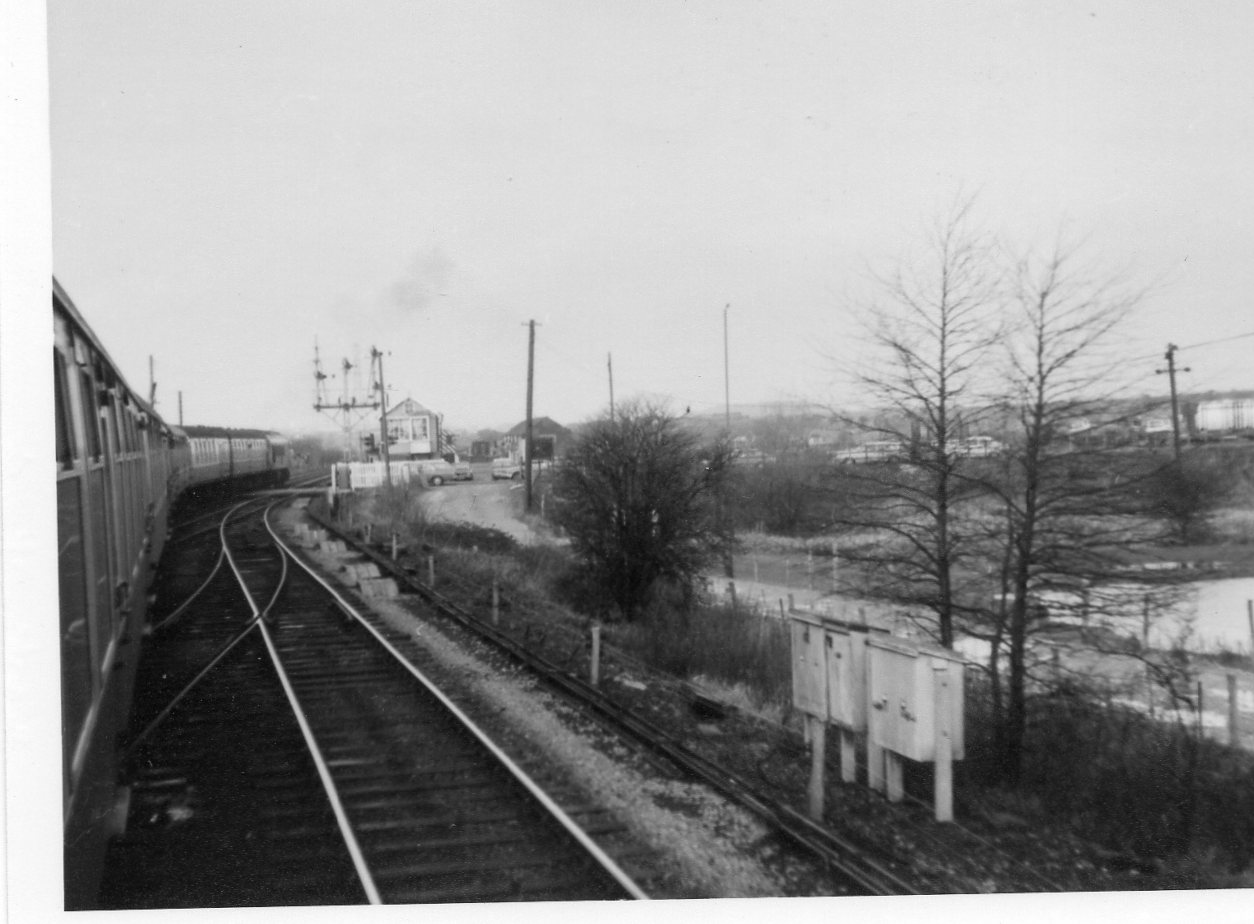
"Beighton Junction 1891" in 1977, northbound2

On 1 December 1891 the Manchester, Sheffield and Lincolnshire railway (MS&LR) started running trains drawn by contractor's locomotives south from a new, additional, "Beighton Junction", approximately 500 yards north west of the first Beighton Junction on the MS&LR, labelled in later Midland system maps as:

- "Beighton Junction G.C.", referred to hereafter as Beighton Junction 1891.

In 1900 the Lancashire, Derbyshire and East Coast Railway (LD&ECR) made another, additional, junction 66 yards (60 m) south of the first. This pair of junctions were thereafter often referred to collectively as "Beighton Junction" as was the adjacent signal box. Their components were recorded as:

- "GC Line Junction (Sheffield Section)" (the original and remaining junction Beighton Junction 1849)

and,

- "GC Line Junction (LD&EC Section)", referred to hereafter as Beighton Junction 1900.

This complex evolution is addressed by the accompanying Route Diagram "Beighton Junction detail."

This article treats these junctions as the lynch pin of a complex interweaving triangular network of lines, stretching over two miles from Killamarsh in the south to Beighton station in the north west and to Waleswood in the north east. That triangle as a whole is addressed by the accompanying Route Diagram "Beighton Junction".

== Overview ==
Beighton Junction went through four distinct phases:

- Initial simplicity from 1849 to 1891
- Sudden expansion from 1891 to 1907
- Consolidation then decline from 1907 to the 1980s, then
- Return to simplicity since the 1980s.

== Initial simplicity ==
The MSLR's "Beighton Branch" and the original Beighton Junction opened to passenger traffic on 12 February 1849. The branch and junction joined the MSLR's east–west main line to the Midland Railway's erstwhile North Midland Railway line from Chesterfield to Rotherham Masborough which still runs south–north along the valley of the River Rother. The MS&LR's Beighton station opened at the same time.

The MS&LR line had been promoted by the Sheffield and Lincolnshire Junction Railway (S&LJ). The first sod was ceremonially cut at High Hazles (nowadays spelled High Hazels and better known as Darnall) in eastern Sheffield on 15 October 1846, to the customary celebrations. The S&LJ and other associated lines were amalgamated in 1847 to form the MS&LR.

The junction made it possible to run trains from Sheffield eastwards, then turn southwards. At the time the modern line directly south from Sheffield was some way from becoming a financial and engineering possibility. The Midland Railway (MR) allowed MS&L trains to run south two stops beyond Beighton Junction to Eckington where passengers had to change for Chesterfield and beyond.

This essentially local scheme continued for forty years. It was condemned to remain local in scope by the opening in 1870 of what was to become known as the "New Road" direct from Sheffield through Bradway Tunnel and Dronfield. This "New Road" led to the Midland Line along the Rother Valley becoming known among railwaymen as the "Old Road." Some attempts were made to run through trains from the MS&L, notably to London, but these more often fell foul of railway politics than operating or financial difficulties. In essence, the MS&L was a provincial railway with ambitions but no cash, the Midland and the LNWR had the lines to the south and the whip hand.

== Sudden expansion ==
=== The Manchester, Sheffield and Lincolnshire Railway ===
The MS&LR was extremely ambitious. On 11 July 1889 its "Derbyshire Lines" Bill was passed by the Lords and by the following January contracts were let for a new line to be built from Beighton to Chesterfield. On 7 February 1890 the first sod was cut at Beighton.

The "Derbyshire Lines" expansion had two overall aims:

- to break the Midland's stranglehold on the rapidly expanding coal traffic to and from the Derbyshire/Nottinghamshire coalfield, and
- to gain access to wider, notably Nottingham and London, markets by joining with the GNR at Annesley, north of Nottingham.

Naturally, the Midland objected, both in parliament and elsewhere.

The "Derbyshire Lines" in question were:

- a new main line from the MS&L's Beighton Branch to the GNR at Annesley. This would provide an entirely MS&L West-South route.
- a new branch from Waleswood, on the MS&L main line east of the Rother, to join the new main line a little over a mile south of the new Beighton Junction, thereby providing an entirely MS&L East-South route, and
- a new branch leaving the new main line at Staveley to serve Chesterfield and, especially, the ambitious and expanding works in the Staveley area.

On 9 May 1890 Parliament granted the MS&L powers to extend the Chesterfield branch southwards to the new main line at Heath, thereby forming a loop.

The initial aim of opening in June 1891 proved over-optimistic, but openings came thick and fast:

- December 1891: goods traffic to Staveley Works via the new Beighton Junction commenced, using contractors' locomotives.
- 1 June 1892: public passenger service from Sheffield (MS&L, later Victoria) via Beighton to Staveley Town, later Staveley Central.
- 1 June 1892: erstwhile passenger service via Beighton to Eckington (MR) ceased.
- 4 June 1892: public passenger service extended to Chesterfield (later Chesterfield Central).
- 24 October 1892: new main line south from Staveley to Annesley opened, allowing MS&L coal and goods trains to reach Nottingham, a key goal of the enterprise.
- 3 January 1893: passenger traffic started south from Staveley to Nottingham London Road
- 3 July 1893: passenger traffic through Chesterfield to Heath started, completing the loop and enabling MS&L trains to travel to Nottingham both
  - direct between Staveley and Heath, or
  - round by the Chesterfield Loop, a situation which continued for almost seventy years.
- 17 July 1893: Waleswood Curve opened for goods traffic, giving the MS&L East to South access to the new main line.
- 1 November 1893: Beighton station, itself a replacement for an earlier station on the Midland's "Old Road", replaced with the third and final Beighton station.
- January 1894: Waleswood Curve opened to passenger traffic.

The gateway to this frenetic activity was the MS&L's new Beighton Junction. The Midland's ire must be understood not in the trivial loss of transfer passenger traffic at Eckington, but in the consequent opening of the Nottinghamshire/Derbyshire coalfield to railway competition. From 1891 to 1894 no fewer than seventeen new colliery branches were opened by the MS&L off the lines catalogued above, most leading to pits already served by the Midland. One such was the Holbrook Colliery Branch which left the new southbound MS&L main line merely yards from their new Beighton Junction.

This new Beighton Junction proved to be the springboard for yet more ambition. Later in the 1890s the MS&L sets its sights on getting to London under its own steam and built the "London Extension" south from Annesley to London Marylebone. The MS&LR became the GCR and the London Extension became the Great Central Main Line. MS&L locals to Killamarsh, coals from Holbrook Colliery and crack expresses from Marylebone to Sheffield Victoria, all were made possible by the MS&LR's junction, the second at Beighton.

=== The Lancashire, Derbyshire and East Coast Railway ===
In the 1880s a grandiose scheme was formulated to build a railway from "Coast to Coast", i.e. from near Warrington on the emerging Manchester Ship Canal (not actually on the coast, but near enough for sloganising purposes) to a wholly new port near Sutton-on-Sea in Lincolnshire. In November 1890 detailed plans for this new line - to be known as the Lancashire, Derbyshire and East Coast Railway (LD&ECR) - were made public, they included a branch from Langwith to Beighton, aiming at the expanding heavy industry in Sheffield. Notice seeking to put a Bill before Parliament was given in the same month.

Effective groundwork had been done so that only 37 petitions objecting to the new line were tabled. Most of those from landowners were "successfully dealt with" (i.e. "bought out" or mitigated, so they were withdrawn) and those from the CLC, LNWR and GN&GEJR were subsequently withdrawn when they became satisfied that the proposed line was either neutral or advantageous to them. The GER went one step further, changing from opponents to supporters, as they saw that the line could give them access to Sheffield and to North Midlands coal.

This left two opponents, the MR and the MS&LR. The Midland's opposition was lukewarm, they saw both opportunities and threats:

- opportunities such as Beighton, where the LD&ECR's traffic would end in a floodplain on the outskirts of Sheffield and would need carrying further, potentially over Midland metals, and
- threats such as Southgate and Barlborough near Clowne where collieries which they served exclusively might be tapped by the new line.

The MS&L's opposition was by far the strongest, not least because the proposed line broadly paralleled their established main line from East to West and would potentially be a direct competitor. Their rumbustious leader, Watkin, described the proposed line as "one of the maddest schemes ever presented to Parliament." So little opposition, and that from a partial source, meant the Bill sailed through Parliament and received Royal assent on 5 August 1891, the biggest line authorised in a single session.

That was the easy bit. Investors prepared to back the scheme were thin on the ground and by the Autumn of 1891 the decision was taken to start building eastwards from Chesterfield to meet the GN&GEJR at Pyewipe Junction west of Lincoln and northwards from Langwith Junction towards Beighton, which would occasionally be referred to as the "Sheffield Branch" but much more widely as the Beighton Branch. As things turned out they were the only two stretches of line which would be built.

As late as 1896 the LD&ECR still had no means of getting into Sheffield and the Beighton Branch still looked set to end in a marsh next to the Rother. In that year a scheme was passed by Parliament permitting the building of the Sheffield District Railway (SDR) from a point on the LD&ECR's Beighton Branch near Barlborough to Attercliffe in Sheffield's northern industrial heartland. This route was both difficult and expensive at a time when the LD&ECR was having trouble financing its Chesterfield-Lincoln main line. The driving forces behind the SDR were Sheffield businessmen and the company was legally independent, but the LD&ECR saw it as a child of its own. Despite the lack of finances the Duke of Norfolk cut the first sod in Attercliffe in 1896.

The Byzantine railway politics of the period then threw up another surprise, the Midland Railway jumped off the fence and offered the LD&ECR and SDR another route into Sheffield. Instead of embarking from Barlborough off the Beighton Branch, the line could:

- make an East-North junction with the Midland Railway's "Old Road" at Beighton, using LD&ECR metals already under construction
- use Midland metals to Treeton
- build a much shorter and cheaper version of the SDR westwards from Treeton, joining the Midland's Sheffield-Rotherham line south of Brightside
- use Midland metals southwards through Attercliffe
- build a short branch to the goods depot under construction in Attercliffe, and
- let passenger trains run beyond Attercliffe to the Midland's Pond Street station at Sheffield.

This was the railway which was actually built. As a result:

- the LD&ECR had a viable route into Sheffield at little extra cost
- the shortened SDR could be built at a fraction of the original cost
- the GER, who had running rights over the LD&ECR, gained access to Sheffield for nothing
- the Midland would gain revenues where LD&ECR trains ran over its metals
- the Midland gained influence over the SDR as the latter ran onto the Midland at both ends, and
- the Midland cocked a snook at the MS&LR.

The East-North junction at Beighton, usually referred to in sources simply as "Beighton Junction", was the third Beighton Junction, as shown on the "Beighton Junction Detail" route diagram. It was formally opened by the Duke of Norfolk on 21 May 1900, along with the SDR. Goods and mineral traffic started on 28 May and passengers on 30 May 1900.

=== The Great Central Railway ===
In 1897 the MS&LR changed its name to the Great Central Railway (GCR) in anticipation of reaching London Marylebone in 1899. Its change of name and scale did not dim its expansionist character.

By 1905 the LD&ECR, which had never been strongly capitalised, was in financial difficulty, despite a strong growth in traffic, notably freight tonnage which had risen from 477,374 tons carried in 1896 to 2,317,714 tons carried in 1905. Its end as an independent company was rapid by any criteria:

- 7 November 1905 the Board resolved to offer the company for sale to the Great Northern Railway (GNR)
- 9 November 1905 the GNR replied, saying that none of the LD&ECR's proposed methods of sale was acceptable
- 10 November 1905 the Board met again and offered the company for sale to the GCR, who had representatives in attendance.
  - Terms were agreed there and then, with the aim of takeover from 1 January 1907.
  - It was agreed that the necessary Parliamentary Bill would include the construction of junctions between the two systems.

1906-7 saw the construction and opening of two wholly separate sets of junctions between the LD&ECR and the GCR:

- Duckmanton Junction where the LD&ECR "Main Line" and Great Central Main Line (GCML) crossed between Staveley and Heath, and
- Killamarsh South and North Junctions, approximately 1.5 miles south of the LD&ECR's Beighton Junction.

These latter two are shown on the "Beighton Junction detail" route diagram. Their positioning south of Killamarsh Junction meant that trains off the LD&ECR could travel:

- to and from the GCR's lines in Sheffield without touching Midland metals, and
- eastwards via the Waleswood Curve

The GCR had the last laugh over the Midland regarding the LD&ECR. Having bitterly opposed the LD&ECR ("...one of the maddest schemes...") and suffered the Midland's ploy of enabling the LD&ECR to get to the heart of Sheffield under the GCR's noses the GCR now owned the usurper and had its trains running over Midland metals to Attercliffe and points nearby. Whatever scores may have been settled the GCR had certainly scotched the competitive threat posed by the LD&ECR and went on to make significant use of its metals, most notably as the Nottinghamshire Coalfield spread eastwards.

=== Other lines ===
Over time the triangle described in this article also contained:

- the River Rother
- the Chesterfield Canal
- five railway branch lines:
  - the Crown Paper Mills branch
  - the North Staveley Curve
  - Glovers Siding
  - the MR's Killamarsh Branch and Extension, and
  - the Holbrook Colliery Branch
- a wagon works
- two substantial locomotive scrapyards:
  - Thos. W. Ward at Beighton, and
  - Thos. W. Ward at Killamarsh
- two significant railway yards:
  - Beighton Yard, off the ex-GCR Beighton Branch, and
  - Beighton Sidings, ex-LD&ECR

Significantly, no roads ran along the valley bottom, and few crossed it, as the river was and is prone to flooding. The natural course of the Rother was slow and meandering, straight out of school geography textbook diagrams. The North Midland "Old Road" did some straightening, but by virtue of coming first it took the easiest and driest line.

The lines which undertook the most preventive work were the Waleswood Curve and the LD&ECR, the former in particular diverted a horseshoe bend in the river to end up with just one crossing - Bedgreave Viaduct - instead of many.

The GCR became a significant victim of the river, in 1937, for example, Beighton station flooded above rail level and by 1950 was forced to undertake platform raising and other works, partly as a result of flood damage and partly as a preventive measure.

As was often the case, railways addressed the same transport needs as canals and faced similar obstacles. The Chesterfield Canal sought to move heavy goods between early industrial North Derbyshire and South Yorkshire and to connect both with the North Sea via the River Trent. Its most famous traffic - Anston stone for the rebuilding of the Houses of Parliament following a disastrous fire in 1834 - was transferred from narrowboats to seagoing craft and taken thereby to the Thames. The MS&LR had a similar objective in building the Waleswood Curve, as well as the additional spur of meeting a clamour of traffic in the opposite direction - iron ore for Staveley Works.

Both the canal and the railway faced the problem of climbing eastwards out of the Rother valley. James Brindley made best use of the technology of his day to build Norwood Locks, immediately followed by Norwood Tunnel which emerged within a stone's throw of what would later be the MS&LR main line near Kiveton Park Colliery. The Waleswood Curve took advantage of later technology and greater resources. It smoothed out the same climb by taking a longer route. It, too, had a tunnel - Waleswood Tunnel - which was a mere 66 yards (60 m) long compared with Brindley's 2,884 yards (2,637 m). Railways in general rendered most narrow canals uneconomic, but the Chesterfield Canal suffered an additional blow when Norwood Tunnel collapsed in 1907.

The five railway branch lines varied considerably.

The Crown Paper Mills branch first appeared on OS maps in 1899–1900. The branch turned a sharp right angle north eastwards off the GCR Beighton Branch immediately north west of the third Beighton station. It served the Crown Paper Mills until the 1940s, after which the mills' site was used by George Slater's scrap metal business. OS maps show rail connections to the site until the 1970s. No evidence suggests that this scrapyard dismantled railway locomotives.

The North Staveley Curve turned sharply eastwards off the MR's "Old Road" between the 1849 Beighton Junction and Beighton Viaduct, which carries the MS&LR's east–west main line over the Rother and the MR's Old Road. The branch was so named because it served North Staveley Colliery, Aston. The line was laid when the company bought and developed Aston Colliery in the 1860s. The 1854 OS map shows the colliery and a tramway running southwards, seemingly to end at right angles to the MS&LR main line. 1877–92 OS maps show the developed position, with the tramroad from the colliery crossing the MS&LR at right angles to enter coal handling facilities immediately south thereof, on Midland metals. Later in the colliery's life the tramway was replaced by a conveyor belt. The coal handling facilities in later years consisted of a hopper, from which coal was dropped into railway wagons. The North Staveley Curve appears to have joined the MS&LR at North Staveley Junction a short distance west of the coal handling facilities, opened on 1 January 1870 but later sources make no mention of "North Staveley Junction" referring consistently to Brookhouse Junction as described below. The North Staveley Colliery Company was intimately connected with the Staveley Coal and Iron Company, based in Staveley, ten miles to the south. When the company bought the mine the MS&LR's "Derbyshire Lines" were far into the future so the Midland Railway was the natural partner to transport the coal southwards, as they already served the ironworks on a large scale. The Midland System Diagrams of 1918 show North Staveley Colliery as "Aston Colliery".

"Beighton Colliery" (or sometimes "Beighton Pit") appears on OS maps from 1905 to 1924 to 1967. The colliery is shown on the Midland Railway System Maps dated 1918 as being served by the joint MR & GCR 748 yards (684 m) "Beighton Colliery Branch", which ran east–west immediately south of the GCR Sheffield-Worksop line. This branch connected to the North Staveley Curve in such a way that Midland trains travelling between the Midland's Old Road and the colliery would have to reverse into and out of branch. GCR trains could proceed straight ahead to the eastern end of the North Staveley Curve and on towards Worksop by what would later be known as Brookhouse Junction.

The same maps show that the later Brookhouse Colliery and its coke works connected both to the North Staveley Curve and to the Sheffield-Retford line, the latter connection having a signalbox for that purpose. Sinking Brookhouse Colliery commenced in 1929 and eventually joined Aston's North Staveley Colliery workings underground, leading to the latter's closure. The hopper mentioned above in connection with North Staveley Colliery appears to have been used to handle Brookhouse Colliery's output in later years. Trains from the ex-GCR east–west line reversed empty wagons under the hopper after which they were allowed to run forward under gravity whilst coal was dropped into them.

Brookhouse coking plant ceased production in October 1981 and Brookhouse Colliery closed on 26 October 1985. Brookhouse Colliery signalbox followed the next year.

Glovers Siding served Glover's Victoria Flour Mill (sometimes referred to as "Valley Mills"), a prominent Killamarsh structure between the GCR and LD&ECR embankments. The single track branch turned south west off the LD&ECR line approximately opposite Killamarsh North Junction. It immediately fell very steeply to ground level then ran south to the mill, making yet another crossing of the Rother in the process. The mill and branch do not appear on the 1905 OS map, but are shown on the 1924 version.

The Midland Railway's Killamarsh Branch opened in 1869, being extended to Kiveton Park in 1878; it survived in part until 1972 and has since been lifted. It turned east off the Midland's Old Road at Killamarsh Branch Junction, passed under a farm track then crossed what was initially open water meadows. When the MS&LR built their Derbyshire Lines and the LD&ECR their Beighton Branch (see above) both crossed the Killamarsh Branch by overbridges and the GCR Walewood Curve ran away northeastwards on an embankment, resulting in a complete character transformation of the first couple of hundred yards of the branch. This was heightened after the Second World War when Thos. W. Ward's Killamarsh Scrapyard opened immediately east of the LD&ECR overbridge. This scrapyard was connected to the branch and specialised in cutting up railway rolling stock, notably wagons and locomotives, for which it became famous in railway enthusiast circles. Truly remarkable footage of this scrapyard in 1960 and 1964 is available on DVD. On-line sources of the size and detail of locomotive "disposals" differ but give an idea of the scale of the operation. Many references to Ward's of Killamarsh confuse the site with the company's other scrapyard in this article's area, Ward's of Beighton. The two were about a mile and a half apart.

Apart from the later arrival of Ward's, the branch served three collieries and a chemical works in its mere three miles, and packed in a tunnel to boot. Notable locations were, from the west:

- Thos. W. Ward's Killamarsh scrapyard
- Ellison and Mitchell's (later Yorkshire Tar Distillers) plant
- Norwood Colliery (sometimes referred to as Holbrook No. 2 colliery)
- West Kiveton Colliery near Mansfield Road, Killamarsh
- Norwood End Tunnel No.10 (300 yards (270 m) long, which now passes under the M1), and
- Kiveton Park Colliery.

Restorers of the Chesterfield Canal have considered using the tunnel, which survives, as a means of getting under the M1, the original canal tunnel having collapsed in part in 1907. To the naked eye this seems an "obvious" solution, but the railway tunnel, like most of the branch extension, is on slope steep by railway standards. As canals require level pounds at least one lock would be necessary inside the tunnel, which would involve digging out the bottom and threatening both the structure's integrity and the M1 above.

The final branch in this article's area is the MS&LR's Holbrook Colliery Branch. Holbrook No. 1 Colliery was situated immediately west of the Midland's Killamarsh station. The Midland had served the colliery for many years when the MS&LR built their branch to the colliery as part of their Derbyshire Lines expansion in the 1890s, described above. The single track branch left the MS&LR's Beighton Branch a short distance south of the third and final Beighton station and ran parallel to what would become the GCML as far as its lattice girder overbridge over the Midland's Old Road, after which it ran parallel to the Old Road to the colliery. The pit closed in 1944 and was demolished in 1961, though most of the ex-GCR branch was lifted before then.

A train using the branch was involved in a fatal accident on 11 February 1942. Metal sheets in a wagon being shunted became dislodged and protruded into the path of a troop train on the adjacent "Down" (northbound) ex-GCR main line. The metal sliced into some of the coaches killing several sailors and injuring more.

A Wagon Works first appeared on OS maps of the area in 1923. It was situated in the "V" of the 1849 Beighton Junction, accessed from the GCR Beighton Branch from the north west, though it could be accessed from the MR Old Road by turning from south to north west, then reversing. Intriguingly, the map also shows a building labelled "Engine Shed". Staying on the same website, by 1956 the site was labelled "Wagon Repair Works". The access lines appear unchanged from the 1923 map.

At some point after the Second World War the wagon works were taken over by the scrap merchant Thos. W. Ward and used for breaking up redundant railway rolling stock, including locomotives, with railway literature referring to the site as both wagon works and Ward's. The location is close to the "V" of the junction, as can be seen from the attached image, where the photographer was on a diverted train travelling from the Old Road to the Beighton Branch, with the Old Road clearly visible to the right of the yard, and Brookhouse Colliery and coke ovens in the distance, north east of camera. Like its fellow site at Killamarsh, it became a focus of interest for railway enthusiasts, but was much less accessible without trespass, with the result that fewer photographs survive.

The DVD cited in the context of Ward's at Killamarsh also contains images of Ward's at Beighton, but the commentary is confusing. Similarly, on-line sources of the size and detail of locomotive "disposals" differ but give an idea of the scale of the operation. Many references to Ward's at Beighton confuse the site with the company's other scrapyard in this article's area, Ward's at Killamarsh. The two were about a mile and a half apart.

A goods yard, elsewhere referred to as Beighton Yard, first appeared on OS maps of the area in 1950–51. It was situated in the "V" of Woodhouse Junction, where the ex-MS&LR main line and their Beighton Branch diverged from 1849 onwards. This is at the extreme top left of the Beighton Branch Route Diagram accompanying this article. The OS map was published in 1950, but the map's data may be from before the Second World War. The yard connected to the Beighton Branch at both ends. The accompanying image of a V2 shows it heading northwestwards along the Beighton Branch immediately before Woodhouse Junction, with tracks to Worksop heading eastwards at the extreme bottom left of the image. As a footnote, this image shows a rare "out of gauge" trap point, two such have been installed new on the Welsh Highland Railway to protect the Cae Pawb level crossing with the ex-Cambrian Railway line at Porthmadog.

A further goods yard, built by the LD&ECR and known as Beighton Sidings, existed immediately south of the 1900 Beighton Junction, next the LD&ECR running lines on their eastern side. The sidings were controlled by a classic LD&ECR signalbox known as Beighton Sidings, situated approximately 400 yards (370 m) south of the junction, which closed on 13 October 1952 and was demolished in 1957. The Midland Railway System Maps show the northern end of the yard as connecting directly onto the North Staveley Curve, as do OS maps. A remnant can be seen below the signalbox in the signalbox diagram of the ex-MR Beighton Junction signalbox, which closed in 1982.

== Lines and Junctions ==
This narrative has described many lines which interlock in the article's area. Some of these lines are short and self-contained whilst others travel further afield and link to others the length and breadth of the land.

An online database exists which gives railway engineer's line reference codes (ELR codes) for all lines in England, Scotland and Wales. Readers may see these stencilled or labelled on structures such as bridges, e.g. "BAC3/25" uniquely identifies a bridge in Clowne, Derbyshire, as being bridge number 25 on line "BAC3". The data behind this coding structure is authoritative, detailed and informative. It is also used within the railway industry. The reader can freely access the database and use the codes to see associated detail.

The lines mentioned in this article are, from north to south:

- Rotherham Masborough-Chesterfield (The Old Road): CHR
- Sheffield Victoria-Worksop: MAC3
- Woodhouse Junction-Beighton Junction 1849 (The MS&LR Beighton Branch): BEW
- North Staveley Curve: BCM
- Beighton Colliery Branch had no engineer's line reference code, but is shown as joining BCM
- GCR Main Line south from Beighton Junction 1891: BEI
- GCR Holbrook Colliery Branch: HOC
- LD&ECR Beighton Branch: WEC1 and WEC2
- Waleswood Curve: WWC
- Killamarsh North Junction to Killamarsh South Junction: KSN
- MR Killamarsh Branch: KIB

Working timetable (WTT) maps show the official extent of lines in use in a particular area at a particular time and are typically presented in schematic form. Snapshots of the lines in the Beighton Junction area and beyond can be seen in the following sequence:

- 1953: London Midland Region, includes the Killamarsh Branch and the Sheffield District Railway, no North Staveley Curve shown, but that may be a question of scale.
- 1959: at least some of the North Staveley Curve remains, accessed from the south; no Killamarsh branch, but that may be a casualty of scale.
- Winter 1966–67: GCR Main Line truncated south of Arkwright, Waleswood Curve still in situ
- Summer 1967: Waleswood Curve and Killamarsh South to North Junction link have gone
- Summer 1972: fewer changes, but the 1891 Beighton Junction being referred to as "Beighton Station Junction"
- Winter 1976-7: much had disappeared from Beighton Junction a remnant being the ex-LD&ECR line (by that time serving Westthorpe Colliery, Killamarsh only) heading southeast with the label "YF".
- 2013: the Network Rail overview of the area including Beighton Junction is shown on the Working timetable (WTT Maps) section of their website, under the heading Section YE Map.

An online database exists which gives railway lines and distances for most lines in England, Scotland and Wales. Readers may use the tables therein to study routes and branches and distances between signalboxes as they were in 1960 The data behind this site is authoritative, detailed and informative. The reader can freely access the codes shown below within this database to see associated detail. Note that distances cited are almost always between signalboxes, not stations, junctions or other structures. This data can be cross-referenced to others cited in this section.

The lines mentioned in this article are, from north to south:

- Rotherham Masborough-Chesterfield (The Old Road): GN72
- Sheffield Victoria-Worksop: GN41
- Woodhouse Junction-Beighton Junction 1849 (The MS&LR Beighton Branch): GN40 (Beighton Jct 1849 to Beighton Jct 1891, GN65 thereafter)
- North Staveley Curve: not shown as such, see Brookhouse under GN41
- Beighton Colliery Branch: not shown as such, see Brookhouse
- GCR Main Line south from Beighton Junction 1891: GN65
- GCR Holbrook Colliery Branch: not shown as such, see GN65
- LD&ECR Beighton Branch: GN37
- Waleswood Curve: GN41
- Killamarsh North Junction to Killamarsh South Junction: not shown as such
- MR Killamarsh Branch: GN79

== Traffic flows ==
=== Passenger services ===
==== Overview ====
The dominant passenger flows were between the south, southeast & east and the west, northwest & north.

By 1922 some 34 regular passenger trains, Monday to Friday, were timetabled to pass northwards through the three Beighton Junctions, plus a similar number southbound. Services varied at weekends, typically with more on Saturdays and fewer on Sundays. The 34 consisted of:

- along the GCML, turning left at the 1891 Beighton Junction
  - 12 stoppers
  - 1 semifast from Leicester Central
  - 5 expresses from Marylebone
  - 1 overnight train from Marylebone carrying mail and passengers, and
  - 5 from the Southwest to points north, such as Bournemouth-York and Penzance-Glasgow
- along the LD&ECR Beighton Branch, turning right at the 1900 Beighton Junction
  - 3 stoppers
- along the Midland Railway Old Road, straight through the 1849 Beighton Junction
  - 7 stoppers.

==== The Waleswood Curve ====
The sole exception was Summer excursion and holiday traffic between North Derbyshire and the east coast via the Waleswood Curve, but this was neither vast nor frequent, the final Summer of operation consisted of the 07:36 Chesterfield Central to Skegness and return, Saturdays Only, from 1 July to 26 August 1961. The curve never carried local passenger traffic.

==== The LD&ECR Beighton Branch ====
Regular, timetabled east-west traffic along the Sheffield Victoria to Worksop line is outside the scope of this article, except in times of strain or exceptional load, when the LD&ECR's Beighton Branch served as a diversionary route, in conjunction with the LD&ECR main line east of Langwith Junction. Some east coast Summer holiday traffic from Manchester Central and Sheffield Victoria was routed via the 1892 MS&LR Beighton Junction, Killamarsh North Junction, Killamarsh South Junction, the LD&ECR Beighton Branch, Langwith Junction and Pyewipe Junction until 1964.

The Sheffield-Worksop line had two long-distance services, the Master Cutler from 1958 and for many years the daily Liverpool Central-Harwich Parkeston Quay boat train. This latter was occasionally diverted using the same route, bringing March Britannias through the remains of Upperthorpe & Killamarsh.

The Beighton Branch also served as an overflow and diversionary route for the GCML, with northbound trains leaving the latter at Kirkby South Junction and travelling up the Leen Valley Extension through Pleasley East to Langwith Junction then to Sheffield using the route described above, regaining the GCML at Killamarsh North Junction. Southbound trains reversed the process.

A notable variation on this routing was the Starlight Express sleeping car service from Marylebone to Glasgow St Enoch and Stirling which ran from 1962 to 1964 to free up the West Coast Main Line for electrification work. In 1963 at least, some of these trains did not regain the GCML at Killamarsh North Junction, but ran through to the 1900 Beighton Junction with the Old Road then turned north to Masborough, the Settle & Carlisle line and the Glasgow & South Western Railway route into Scotland. Other trains in this quite extensive service ran straight up the GCML, through the 1892 Beighton Junction and headed northwards via Sheffield Victoria.

Two further passenger flows passed southeastwards to and from the LD&ECR route at one of the Beighton Junctions:

- Excursions and special trains sometimes took the route described above, via the 1892 Beighton Junction and Killamarsh North and South Junctions, e.g.:
  - football specials, often connected with matches involving Sheffield Wednesday at Hillsborough near Wadsley Bridge, west of Sheffield Victoria
  - simple "excursions" sometimes in connection with an event or to attract shoppers, and
  - enthusiasts' specials, such as the Flying Scotsman "Great Central Railtour" of 18 April 1964
- Timetabled stopping passenger trains plied between Sheffield Midland and Mansfield but they took a different route through this article's area. Having set off northeastwards from Sheffield they swung east along the Sheffield District Railway then south onto the "Old Road" at Treeton Junction to approach the 1900 Beighton Junction from the north, whereupon they turned southeast (left) onto the LD&ECR. This service's trains consisted of LD&ECR stock hauled by Midland locomotives. This arrangement was a quid pro quo for the GCR not exercising the LD&ECR's running rights into the Midland's Sheffield station. The Midland then the LMSR both took pains to observe the agreement as they suspected that the GCR and the LNER would jump at the chance to seize their pound of flesh if it were broken. The service lasted until the outbreak of World War II, when it was summarily withdrawn.

From 1988 into the early 1990s a preservation group named the "Rother Valley Railway" had a brief existence on the site of Upperthorpe & Killamarsh station. The line had three locomotives on loan, a five-ton steam crane and a membership of over eighty. Although the line featured in a two-page article in The Railway Magazine in 1990 little seems to have happened and the society faded away.

==== The Midland Railway "Old Road" ====
After 1870, when the Midland Railway opened its "New Road" direct between Sheffield to Chesterfield via Bradway Tunnel the "Old Road" running north-south through the 1849 and 1900 Beighton Junctions became a passenger backwater. Apart from diversions and specials there was only a very thin stopping service.

In 1922 these "Old Road" passenger services were at their most intensive:

- On Sundays only
  - stopping trains plied directly between Rotherham Masborough and Chesterfield (MR)
- On Mondays to Saturdays three stopping services plied between Sheffield (MR) and Chesterfield
  - most ran direct along the "New Road" through Dronfield
- the other two set off northeastwards from Sheffield (MR) towards Rotherham then swung east to go the "long way round" via the "Old Road"
  - one of these continued past Holmes, a short distance before Masboro', then swung hard right, next stop Treeton, heading south
  - the other continued past Attercliffe Road then swung right onto the Sheffield District Railway passing through or calling at West Tinsley and Catcliffe before turning south onto the Old Road at Treeton Junction.

These services had fizzled out by 1954, the stations on the Old Road having closed in dribs and drabs in the early 1950s, with Barrow Hill the last to close on 5 July 1954, but that was on the cessation of services along the Clowne Branch; Old Road stopping services appear to have ended on 1 February 1954.

Specials, excursions and Summer Holiday trains, such as the Summer Saturdays Filey Holiday Camp-King's Norton, which passed between Rotherham and Chesterfield but did not stop at Sheffield continued for some time. The 1963 WTT shows the following flows north–south straight through the 1849 Beighton Junction:

- Midlands-Yorkshire Coast, e.g. Leicester London Road—Scarborough Central
- Northern England-South Coast, e.g. Bradford Forster Square—Paignton
- Midlands-Scotland Car Carrier between Stirling and Sutton Coldfield, and
- a lone Starlight Express variant, from Kettering to Glasgow St Enoch, Fridays Only, northbound only.

In 1965 a connecting spur was installed between the former Nunnery Colliery Branch and the ex-MS&LR Main Line a quarter of a mile east of Sheffield Victoria. This allowed trains from Sheffield Midland to run north eastwards onto ex-MS&LR metals and vice versa. From 4 October of that year most services which had run to and from the east into Sheffield Victoria were diverted to Sheffield Midland. This had no direct, daily effect on Beighton Junction, but it did open up the possibility of diverted trains using Beighton as a diversionary route. Diverted southbound trains could travel northeast from Sheffield Midland onto the ex-MS&LR line, east to Woodhouse Junction, southeast to the Beighton Junction 1849 then southwards down the Old Road to regain their conventional route at Tapton Junction north of Chesterfield. Northbound trains could reverse the process.

Such diversions occurred from time to time, with the complete closure of the New Road from 17 August to 7 September 1969 for the demolition of Broomhouse Tunnel providing a prolonged example.

Football specials for Hillsborough Football ground ran to Wadsley Bridge from the Midland Main Line and places such as Birmingham ran for many years, being able to run northwards up the old Road then turn west (left) at the 1849 Beighton Junction, straight through Sheffield Victoria to Wadsley Bridge. This was doubly more convenient than running through Sheffield Midland as it avoided a reversal at Nunnery Junction and avoided the relatively congested New Road and Sheffield Midland itself.

==== The Great Central Main Line ====
The greatest passenger flow through Beighton Junction was West-South.

- The 1849–1870 period posed considerable obstacles to southward travel to and from Sheffield. Their origins were geographical - the barrier posed by hills between Sheffield and Chesterfield - but the hotch potch of solutions stemmed as much from railway rivalry as from the industry's immaturity. In essence, the Midland Railway held a monopoly which it only allowed the MS&LR to nibble at with trains to Eckington, where passengers would have to change to Midland trains.
- By opening Bradway Tunnel in 1870 the Midland consolidated their monopoly on traffic south from Sheffield; few would prefer to travel west-south on the MS&L via Beighton Junction (1849) to Eckington, change trains to Chesterfield then change again for the south when they could travel south direct.
- The MS&LR's 1891 Beighton Junction opened new opportunities for passengers to travel west-south to and from Sheffield. A traveller could use the new "Derbyshire Lines" to reach GNR services in Nottingham and then go further, but once again, few would do so in preference to simply going south through Bradway Tunnel. The Derbyshire Lines did, however, open local travel opportunities to places such as Staveley.
- The Great Central's "London Extension" of 1899 built a wholly new line connecting the Derbyshire lines at Annesley, north of Nottingham to The Metropolitan Railway near Aylesbury and a new terminus at London Marylebone. This was a game-changer for Beighton Junction. At a stroke the 1891 Beighton Junction started handling express passenger services and intending travellers had a real, as opposed to notional, choice of route south from Sheffield.

The Great Central's services offered competition to the Midland, but the deck was stacked against the former:

- service quality was comparable
- the Midland was well-established in travellers' minds and habits
- the GCR route was 3.3% longer, putting pressure on costs
- apart from the climb to Bradway Tunnel, the Midland route was more easily graded, and
- the Midland's Sheffield station was more central, as was St Pancras.

This meant the Great Central could only compete on two fronts - price and speed.

To compete on price they had to undercut the Midland or carry more passengers or some combination of the two. By 1905 Great Central express services were quicker from London to Sheffield than the Midland, but at the expense of having to run five coach trains including a restaurant car. Much enterprise was shown in the Edwardian period to attract customers to the new line, but in modern business parlance it lacked a unique selling point.

By 1922 the Midland's London services were quicker than the Great Central's, typically by 15 to 30 minutes

On Saturday 13 September 1958 the last Master Cutler ran via Beighton Junction, being recast as a diesel-hauled Pullman service from Sheffield Victoria to London King's Cross via Retford on and from the following Monday.

The last year-round daytime services from Marylebone through Beighton Junction to Sheffield and Manchester ran on Saturday 2 January 1960. From the following Monday they were either withdrawn or truncated at Nottingham Victoria. The line's last named train, the Bradford Exchange-Marylebone "South Yorkshireman" was replaced by a service in two parts. The first ran from Halifax via Huddersfield to Sheffield Midland where, after a considerable wait it was joined by a portion from Bradford Forster Square. The combined train then ran to St Pancras.

Stopping trains on the GCML north of Nottingham last ran on 3 March 1963.

Through Summer holiday trains ran again that year, with at least two long-established overnight trains plying west-south through the 1891 Beighton Junction:

- Manchester Piccadilly—Hastings, and
- Dover Marine—Newcastle

This left four regular, year-round timetabled passenger trains through the 1892 Beighton Junction up to the closure of the GCML as a through route on 5 September 1966.

The "Up" (southbound) four were:

- 10:08 York - Poole, which left Sheffield Victoria at 11:37 and passed Beighton Junction around 11:52
- 18:40 York - Swindon, which left Sheffield Victoria at 20:55 and passed Beighton Junction around 21:10
- 22:20 York - Swindon, which left Sheffield Victoria at 00:09 and passed Beighton Junction around 00:24, and
- 23:05 Manchester Central - London Marylebone, which left Sheffield Victoria at 00:45 and passed Beighton Junction around 01:00

This last, in the early hours of 4 September 1966, was the final Sheffield Victoria-Marylebone via ex-GCR metals. Further south, near Kirkby Bentinck, the line was severed almost immediately, with colour light signals still glowing red, though traffic to Arkwright Colliery via Duckmanton Junction continued for some years.

With this closure also ended the GCR's other notable passenger role - excursions and special traffic. The line's relative over-capacity, its long-distance connections and its access to Wembley Stadium made special traffic to hockey, football and Rugby League matches significant business, especially after World War II.

The Manchester Central-Marylebone on 4 September 1966 was the last timetabled train south onto the GCML via the 1891 Beighton Junction, but the final passenger train of all passed in 1977 or 1978 when the Royal Train travelled northwards along the Old Road, turned left (westwards) at the 1849 Beighton Junction, came to a halt in the site of Beighton's third station, then reversed gingerly over the 1891 Beighton Junction onto the Up line of the remaining stump of the GCML, coming to a halt in the vicinity of the lattice girder bridge over the Old Road. The view westwards from the carriages can hardly have been edifying, as the erstwhile Down line was occupied by redundant goods wagons as far as the eye could see.

==== Other lines ====
None of the "other lines" described above ever carried a passenger service.

=== Freight ===
As with passenger traffic, the dominant freight flows were between the south, southeast & east and the west, northwest & north. Once again, the exception was the Waleswood Curve.

==== The Waleswood Curve ====
The Staveley Coal and Iron Company lobbied for the curve as a means of getting coal and North Lincolnshire iron ore to their works at Staveley. This traffic waned as other sources were found and the Appleby-Frodingham Steel Company scooped up most of the ore at source. By the 1960s traffic was thin, with photographic evidence suggesting that one daily train - a New Clee-Banbury express fish - provided the line's principal traffic. That this traffic survived into the 1960s is perhaps surprising, as similar trains, collectively known as "Whitland Fish", ran between the same places, but diagrammed via the five miles shorter route via Lincoln, Pyewipe Junction, the LD&ECR Main Line to Clipstone East Junction then down the ex-Mansfield Railway line to the GCML at Kirkby South Junction.

When the ex-GCR Main Line closed as a through route in 1966 the Waleswood Curve lost any possibility of through traffic to or from the south. Trains running up the ex-LD&ECR Beighton Branch could use the curve to head east, though there was little historical precedent for this, Beighton Branch traffic had most commonly aimed at Sheffield or Mottram, with some in early post-war days going further northwest to Gorton, Deansgate and Walton-on-the-Hill, Liverpool.

==== The LD&ECR Beighton Branch ====
Traditionally the Beighton Branch had two types of freight traffic, coal and through services, usually diversionary or relief traffic off the ex-GCR main line. This latter disappeared when the main line closed, leaving coal, plus small amounts of residual traffic such as the Saturdays Only Wadsley Bridge Batchelors canning factory to Oddicroft Metal Box factory at Sutton-in-Ashfield which ran along the Beighton Branch then the Leen Valley Extension until the former closed as a through route, whereafter it ran via Shireoaks, Whitwell the new MR-LD&ECR spur south of Creswell, through the site of Shirebrook North then onto the Leen Valley extension right up to the latter's closure on 27 May 1968.

Coal remained King, but his domain was shrinking. By the 1960s the Beighton Branch had three working collieries - Westthorpe (near Spinkhill), and Langwith. Coal also arrived on the branch from pits along the Leen Valley Extension and pits east of Langwith Junction, such as Warsop. That, too was changing, closures and rationalisation on the Leen Valley Extension reduced that source. For example, Pleasley Colliery joined underground with Shirebrook Colliery and started sending its coal to the surface via Shirebrook, displacing the railway traffic from ex-GNR to ex-Midland metals, away from the Beighton Branch.

Changes in demand also influenced the flow of coal. By the 1960s household coal was in decline and power station coal was on the rise. In 1959, for example, High Marnham Power Station opened and immediately created a new demand in a new location. This was followed in the 1960s by larger new power stations in the Trent Valley whose demand for coal necessitated new technology, which was provided in notable forms such as "TOPS" and computer timetabled Merry-go-round trains (mgr). West Burton Power Station's power signalbox was opened in 1965, in preparation for stockpiling coal on a wholly different scale from traditional working.

West Burton was accessible from Langwith and Creswell collieries via the Beighton Branch, but several factors militated against it:

- the route would be circuitous, setting off northwest then turning northeast along the Waleswood Curve to go east to Worksop
- the route was steeply graded to the summit at Clowne, and mgr trains were much heavier than anything before
- the M1 was being built northwards and would either have to bridge or breach the branch near Barlborough, and
- capacity on the alternative route along the ex-MR Nottingham-Worksop route (now the Robin Hood Line) meant this traffic could easily be accommodated.

A wholly new connection was built across fields near the Norwood Crossings south of Creswell (not near to or to be confused with Norwood Tunnel or Norwood End No.10 Tunnel, which are near Killamarsh). This enabled coal from pits such as Warsop to travel along the first, easily graded couple of miles of the Beighton Branch then switch east to the ex-MR line and head for Worksop. This opened on 9 January 1967. The Beighton Branch was severed and lifted from that point to the north end of Spinkhill Tunnel. The M1 breached the trackbed near Barlborough and Creswell's coal went out exclusively over ex-Midland metals, with Langwith's following in 1969. Westthorpe's coal went northwards along the remaining northern end of the branch, which was renamed the "Westhorpe Colliery Branch" and given the Engineer's Code WEC1. This history is traced in the route diagram associated with the Beighton Branch article. The quantities from Westthorpe did not justify retaining the Waleswood Curve, which was also closed on 9 January 1967, so Westthorpe's coal worked along the ex-LD&ECR to Beighton Junction (1900), immediately across the Old Road via Beighton Junction (1849), northwest along the 1849 MS&LR Beighton Branch crossing Beighton Junction (1891) in the process, running round in sidings between Woodhouse Junction signalbox and Woodhouse to head off east to Cottam or West Burton. This arrangement lasted until Westthorpe pit closed in 1984, after which point the branch was cut back to a siding.

Severing the Beighton Branch led to a re-routing of west to southeast coal traffic from Treeton Colliery which travelled to Rotherwood Sidings then reversed southeast to Woodhouse Junction, Beighton Junction 1849 then Beighton Junction 1900 along the Beighton Branch. That subsequently travelled to Rotherwood and reversed directly along the MS&L Main Line to Shireoaks, bypassing all Beighton Junctions. It then turned south along the now Robin Hood Line then south east along the new chord to gain its original route. This would have been shorter by the full Beighton Branch, but as it was an mgr train it would have been very demanding uphill to Clowne.

==== The Great Central Main Line ====
The ex-GCR Main Line was severed in 1966. It was subsequently lifted north of Nottingham as far as Duckmanton North Junction. The line from there to Beighton Junction (1891) was retained as a long branch to serve Arkwright Colliery, west of Chesterfield. The detailed and eventful history of the lines serving Arkwright is given the Duckmanton Junction article; as far as Beighton Junction is concerned the Beighton-Arkwright branch was in turn severed in 1982, ending any possibility of revenue earning traffic from the remaining stump through Beighton Junction. The line was duly closed north of Staveley and track from the site of Staveley Central through the site of Killamarsh Central was lifted in February 1983.

The sidings on both sides of the original Beighton Branch south of the site of Beighton Station were thinned out to leave a single siding, as can be seen in the foreground of the following linked image of a nine coach train headed by a Class 47 heading south towards the 1849 Junction which is behind the camera. In due course the siding also disappeared, leaving two plain lines southeast to the 1849 Beighton Junction; this remains the situation in 2013.

==== The Midland Railway "Old Road" ====
Goods traffic along the Old Road through Beighton Junction 1900 and Beighton Junction 1849 was always frequent, varied and wide-ranging.

It is easy for modern observers of Britain's predominantly passenger railway to forget that until the 1950s goods traffic was dominant on the railways. This dominance was exaggerated on the Old Road because the ex-Midland main line split at Tapton Junction north of Chesterfield into the "New Road" heading northwest to Sheffield and the "Old Road" heading northeast to Rotherham. Most passenger traffic took the New Road and most freight traffic took the Old Road. The dominance was exaggerated yet further because Beighton Junction lay between the iron and steelmaking areas of Sheffield, Rotherham and Teesside on the one hand and the North Derbyshire coalfield and the iron ore quarries of Northamptonshire on the other.

In 1972 Peter Hogarth wrote "the 'old road' carries a still considerable volume of freight traffic, running for most of its length through a barren and malodorous wasteland of chemical plants, coking ovens and steel works."

From the mid-1950s to the late 1990s British railway goods traffic "fell off a cliff." From then up to 2013 it made something of a recovery, albeit from a very low base.

Up to the early 1960s the dominant traffic along the Old Road through Beighton Junction was coal and iron ore carried on slow, steam-hauled, loose-coupled trains with corresponding "empties" in the opposite direction. Mineral traffic was more of a "natural traffic" for railways than goods in wagon-loads or less where transhipment, marshalling, remarshalling and final transhipment time and costs were prohibitive.

The history of freight traffic through Beighton Junction in this period of great change can be summarised in four words: fewer, faster, heavier and further.

Iron ore traffic from the Wellingborough area of Northamptonshire along the ex-Midland main line and along the Old Road through Beighton Junction fell away sharply in the 1960s, largely as a result of changes in steel production techniques rendering Northamptonshire ore unsuitable. Although "iron concentrate" - a substitute for traditional iron ore - began to be produced as a substitute for traditional ore it was sent to the Potteries and not through Beighton.

Coal traffic changed in several ways:

- sources concentrated onto fewer, larger collieries
- trains became predominantly Merry Go Round ("mgr") block trains
- the market shifted towards high-volume power stations, often newly built away from traditional locations, such as the lower Aire and Trent valleys.

These trends are described above in the context of the LD&ECR and apply also to the Old Road.

A little-sung use of the Old Road, usually passing straight through Beighton Junction 1849 was for running in and acceptance trials for stock, especially those built or renovated at Derby or Doncaster. Some early HSTs used the route in this way.

== Modern times ==
As of 2021, the two lines remain in use for freight and occasional specials and excursions. The "Old Road" north of here is freight-only, but a number of passenger services use the line from Tapton Junction and the connection to Woodhouse Junction for operational reasons (i.e. train crew route knowledge retention).
