= Beighton =

Beighton may refer to:

== People ==
- Graham Beighton (born 1939), English footballer
- Henry Beighton (1687–1743), English engineer and surveyor
- Nick Beighton (born 1981), British paracanoeist
- Peter Beighton (born 1934), British geneticist
- Sean Beighton (born 1988), American curler
- Thomas Beighton (1790–1844), English missionary

=== Fictional characters ===
- Miss Beighton, a character in Kipling's short story Cupid's Arrows

== Places ==
- Beighton, Norfolk, England
- Beighton, South Yorkshire, Sheffield, England
  - Beighton railway station (closed 1954)
  - Beighton Junction, a series of railway junctions
  - Beighton (ward), the ward within Sheffield
- Beighton Fields, Derbyshire, England

== Other uses ==
- Beighton Cup, a field hockey tournament in India
- Beighton score, a measure of joint hypermobility
