= Spinkhill Tunnel =

Railway tunnel in Derbyshire, England

Spinkhill Tunnel is a disused twin-track railway tunnel south of Spinkhill railway station in Derbyshire, England.

== History ==
The 501 yards long tunnel was opened by the Lancashire, Derbyshire and East Coast Railway (later part of the Great Central Railway and subsequently the LNER) on 21 September 1898. It was the only tunnel on its Beighton Branch (occasionally referred to as the "Sheffield Branch") which ran north westwards from Langwith Junction to Beighton Junction. The LD&ECR and its successors always referred to Spinkhill station, tunnel and signalbox as "Spink Hill", though the spelling "Spinkhill" is now universal. See, for example, railway tickets in the Glynn Waite collection.

The Beighton Branch lost its local passenger traffic at the outbreak of World War II but remained in use for excursions, diversions and relief, together with its prime purpose - coal. Spinkhill station had an extra role - schools specials at the start and end of term at Mount St Mary's School in Spinkhill.

The line through the tunnel was closed on 9 January 1967 and was subsequently lifted, though tracks almost to the tunnel mouth from the north remained in use until 1984 for wagon storage and shunting at Westthorpe Colliery, Killamarsh.

== Relics ==
At 2007 the tunnel had not been infilled and could be accessed on foot, though it is not a public right of way. By 20 July 2013 foliage had finally rendered the northern portal invisible from the former railway bridge on the Spinkhill to High Moor road known as "Station Road." As of 2015, the tunnel portals have been sealed with possible infilling to take place 53°18′23.7″N 1°18′53.58″W
