= Spinkhill railway station =

Former railway station in Derbyshire, England

Coordinates: 53.3072°N 1.3159°W

Spinkhill
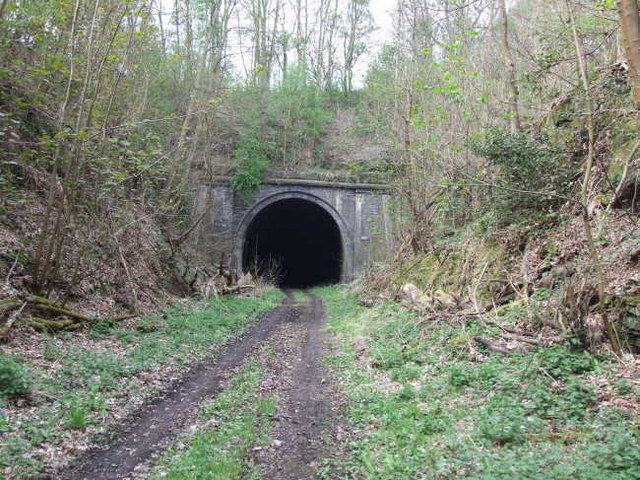

General information
- Location: Spinkhill, North East Derbyshire; England
- Platforms: 2 (reduced to 1 in later years)

Other information
- Status: Disused

History
- Original company: LD&ECR
- Pre-grouping: Great Central Railway
- Post-grouping: LNER; British Railways

Key dates
- 1 October 1898: Opened
- 11 September 1939: scheduled services end
- after 1958: Closed completely
Location

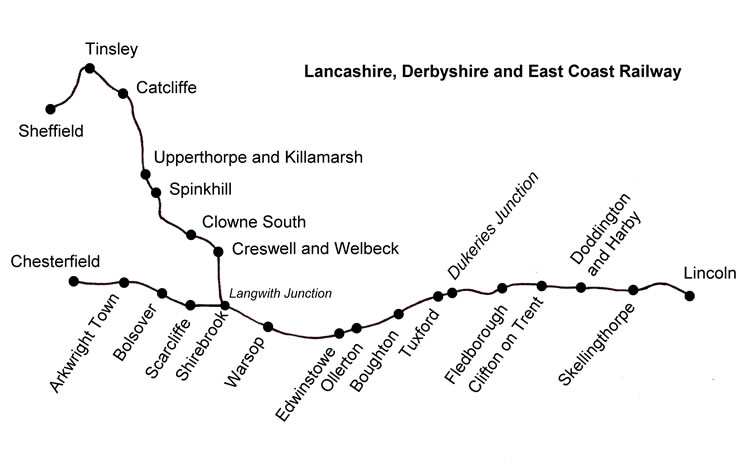
LD&ECR and Sheffield District Railway

Spinkhill railway station is a disused railway station in Spinkhill, Derbyshire, England.

== History ==
The station was built by the Lancashire, Derbyshire and East Coast Railway on their Beighton Branch, within sight of the northern portal of Spinkhill Tunnel. It opened in 1898 and closed to regular timetabled passenger traffic in 1939, though start and end of term special trains for pupils at the nearby Mount St Mary's College continued for some years thereafter.

The line through the station was closed as a through route on 9 January 1967 but trains continued to serve the nearby Westthorpe Colliery until it closed in 1984. This involved using the former running lines and the sidings behind the station house.

== Modern times ==
The humpback bridge over the trackbed between the station and the tunnel survives, as does the station house, which is now a private residence. The tunnel can still be discerned but is now overgrown. The track through the station site and tunnel was lifted after the closure of the line when the colliery closed.

Preceding station	Disused railways	Following station
Upperthorpe and Killamarsh; Line and station closed	Great Central Railway; Lancashire, Derbyshire and East Coast Railway	Clowne South; Line and station closed
