= Clowne South railway station =

Former railway station in Derbyshire, England

Coordinates: 53.2760°N 1.2619°W

Clowne South
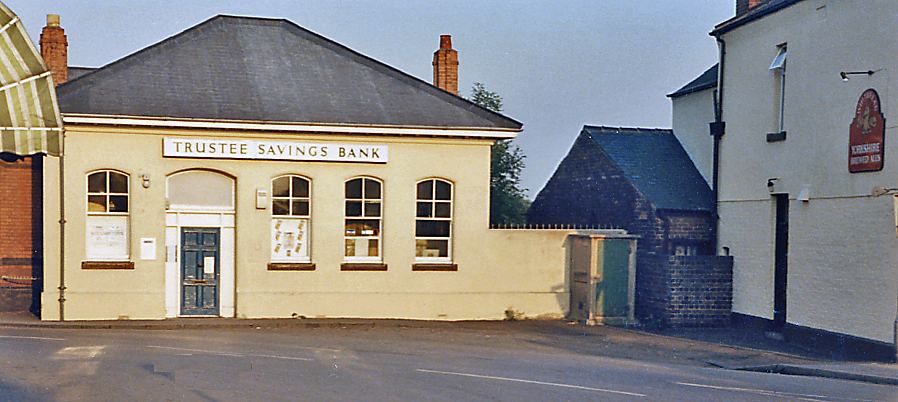
- The station building in 1983

General information
- Location: Clowne, Bolsover; England
- Grid reference: SK 492 757
- Platforms: 2

Other information
- Status: Disused

History
- Original company: LD&ECR
- Pre-grouping: Great Central Railway
- Post-grouping: LNER; British Railways

Key dates
- 8 March 1897: Opened as Clown
- 10 September 1939: Regular passenger services ceased
- c. 1951: renamed Clowne South
- c. April 1964: Station closed completely
- 9 January 1967: Line closed completely
Location

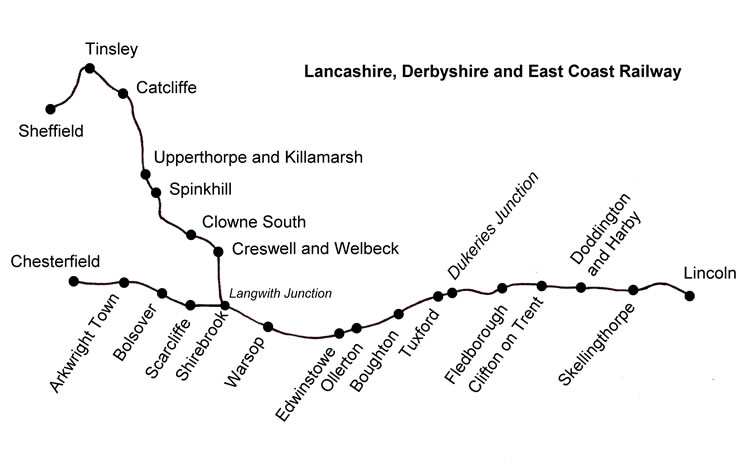
LD&ECR and Sheffield District Railway

Clowne South railway station is a former railway station in Clowne, Derbyshire, England.

== History ==
The station was opened by the Lancashire, Derbyshire and East Coast Railway on its Beighton Branch in March 1897 as "Clown". It was closed to regular timetabled passenger traffic in September 1939 although Summer Weekend excursions continued until 1964. At least one fine photograph of such a train for Skegness appears in print.

Whilst the above-tracks station building was unique on the LD&ECR the Stationmaster's House was styled in the company's distinctive architecture.

The station was close to the Clowne and Barlborough station of the Midland Railway (MR), which was about 40 yards to the north on a parallel track. Both the MR line through Clowne and Barlborough station and the LD&ECR line through Clowne South continued westwards under adjacent road bridges then through deep cuttings, which ran parallel for several hundred yards. The MR line then went downhill and the LD&ECR went uphill, enabling it to swing northwest and cross the Midland line near the branch to Barlborough Colliery. After this it dropped steeply to the Rother valley via Spinkhill Tunnel. The line through Clowne South was closed to all traffic on 9 January 1967 when a new connection to what is now the Robin Hood Line was opened south of Creswell. This also allowed the line to be severed near Barlborough in connection with the northern extension of the M1 motorway. All tracks through the station were subsequently lifted. This change is shown in the route diagrams associated with the Beighton Branch article.

Clowne South's booking hall was substantial and stood on top of the bridge straddling the two tracks, with ramps down to the two platforms. The station had a substantial goods shed.

The two lines at Clowne each had sidings, which were interconnected, but the connection was not used for through trains.

== Former passenger services ==
There never was a Sunday service from Clowne South.

Services started with a stutter. On 8 March 1897 services began southwards to Langwith Junction (later renamed Shirebrook North) only. Creswell and Welbeck station was not yet open, nor were tracks to the north. The line was extended to Spinkhill ("Spink Hill" in LD&ECR terms) and Upperthorpe and Killamarsh on 1 October 1898. The through lines north of Killamarsh to Sheffield (later renamed "Sheffield Midland") finally opened on 30 May 1900, allowing the core stopping service which continued until the outbreak of WW2.

By 1922 the service had settled down to three trains a day, calling at all stations from Sheffield (later Sheffield Midland) to Mansfield via Catcliffe, Clowne South, Langwith Junction and Shirebrook (later renamed Shirebrook West, now plain "Shirebrook" on the Robin Hood Line). There was a late evening extra southbound on Saturdays and an early afternoon extra northbound to match. There was also a late evening train from Langwith Junction on Saturdays which terminated at Clowne South.

== Other services ==
Local passenger services and local goods were very small beer compared with the other services over the line, i.e.:

- Summer holiday traffic and excursions, e.g. to football matches
- Special trains, e.g. for railway enthusiasts
- alternative routing to relieve congestion
- diversions, and
- coal.

Only the first needed to call at Clowne South, the others needed the tracks through it.

Summer holiday traffic was big business until it was hit from three sides by the rise of the car, by the package holiday revolution and by Beeching, who deemed the whole exercise financial nonsense. The traditional Summer Holiday excursion – "Wakes Week Specials" in some parts of the country – was decimated in the early 1960s, both stations at Clowne being prime examples. An early 1960s Working Timetable shows weekend trains through Clowne South between Manchester Central and Skegness and between Manchester Central and Yarmouth Vauxhall. "Excursions" were wide-ranging; they could be for a day at the seaside, for a football match, for sightseeing such as to York or just cheap tickets on service trains to drum up custom. This last was impossible after the station closed to normal traffic, but an example of an "excursion" was a train in 1957 to Sheffield via Clowne South.

The line from Killamarsh South Junction through Clowne South to Langwith Junction then through Shirebrook South to Kirkby South Junction acted as a loop line to the GCML, because it connected with it at both ends. Both lines had significant gradients north of Nottingham, so the line through Clowne relieved a potential bottleneck, especially for freight. As freight traffic fell dramatically from the mid-1950s less and less congestion needed to be relieved. The GCML was closed north of Nottingham in September 1966, leaving nothing at all to relieve. Before that the line had a last hurrah when a sleeping car service from Marylebone to Glasgow was routed through Clowne South from 1962 to 1964.

The line through Clowne South was useful for diversions in times of disruption such as essential trackwork. In the days before widespread "replacement bus services" two routes in particular benefitted from this, the GCML and the line from Lincoln to Sheffield via Retford. The history of GCML diversions matched that of GCML relief - the traffic vanished. The Lincoln to Sheffield line is still active today, but it carries almost no long-distance freight and no long-distance passenger traffic. Up to the early 1960s "The Boaty" - the daily Liverpool Central to Harwich Parkeston Quay boat train - was an occasional sight trundling along the LDECR through Warsop, Shirebrook North and Clowne South, regaining the route into Sheffield Victoria at Killamarsh. In essence there became less and less traffic to divert.

A number of railway enthusiasts' special trains ran through Clowne South in its declining years, driven by a mixture of rising affluence and awareness of things passing. One such is recorded on film, though only the northern approach to Cliff Hill at Clowne can be seen.

This left the staple of the LD&ECR - coal. Coal was king in North East Derbyshire in the first half of the 20th century. His rule passed steadily eastwards as older mines worked out and newer, larger and deeper pits were sunk in Nottinghamshire. These typically sent their output eastwards to power stations on the Trent. This meant that the LD&ECR line eastwards from Langwith Junction thrived whilst that to the west via Clowne withered. By 1960 the only producing pit on the line through Clowne South was Westthorpe Colliery, Killamarsh. It survived until 1984 but its coal went out northwards. Coal traffic through Clowne South withered but did not die; some coal continued to be sent north westwards. There always had been duplication of lines and services; indeed when the railways were built it was called "competition". When traffic was high, duplication gave flexibility and allowed traffic to run freely, as summarised above. As traffic withered "flexibility" became "redundancy" and "over-provision." By the mid-1960s it was realised that the traffic from all sources running through Clowne South and through Elmton and Creswell on what is now the Robin Hood Line could be accommodated entirely on the latter. The connection between the two lines at Shirebrook Junction ran (and still runs) south-to-east, so coal running north westwards from collieries such as Ollerton would end up facing the wrong way on the wrong track at Shirebrook, which, apart from long-standing custom and practice, was why it travelled via Clowne South. The solution adopted was to build a brand new connection between the LD&ECR and MR lines across fields near Langwith Colliery. This enabled east to northwest traffic to travel through Langwith Junction, head off towards Clowne South, then veer right onto the Robin Hood Line facing north. From then on such trains could turn west or east as appropriate north of Whitwell. The effect was to render the track between the new connection line, through Clowne South to Westthorpe Colliery, Killamarsh redundant, so it was closed and lifted.

Clowne South was progressively left high and dry.

== Modern times ==
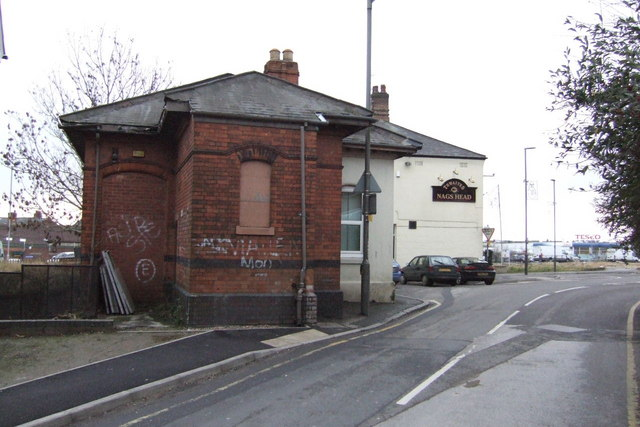
The former station booking hall

The track through the Clowne and Barlborough station site has been lifted, though the trackbed remains protected and bridges are well maintained. It continues through its cutting to the west as described above. The bridge before the cutting can give the appearance of a tunnel. Foliage means this is no longer viewable from 'The Sidings' skate park near the old Tertiary College, which has been demolished. The positioning of the booking hall over the tracks can readily be seen by walking round the left hand side of the booking hall at street level. This can be done entirely in a public area. The cutting through which the Clowne South line ran has been infilled and lies buried under the road that leads to Tesco and the new roundabout. The old trackbed can be followed south eastwards through Linear Park, before you descend down some steps where there would have been a bridge to carry the tracks towards Markland Grips.

For many years after closure of the line the station booking hall was used by a bank. They were eventually replaced by a supplier of bridal wear. At 20 July 2013 the booking hall appeared refurbished and in the hands of a photography firm. The adjacent stationmaster's house has undergone a rescue and revival; having at one time looked derelict, it is a business centre and has externally been sympathetically restored to its typical LDECR appearance.

Preceding station	Disused railways	Following station
Spinkhill; Line and station closed	Great Central Railway; Lancashire, Derbyshire and East Coast Railway	Creswell and Welbeck; Line and station closed
