= William Batty =

William Batty or William Battie may refer to:

- William Batty (performer) (1801–1868), British circus proprietor and equestrian performer
- William Batty (mayor) (1823–1893), English jeweller, clockmaker and local politician
- William Battie (1703–1776), English physician
- William Batty, stagename of Noah Mickens, ringmaster
- Billy Batty (1886–after 1922), an English footballer
