= Upperthorpe and Killamarsh railway station =

Former railway station in Derbyshire, England

Coordinates: 53°19′17″N 1°19′38″W

Upperthorpe and Killamarsh
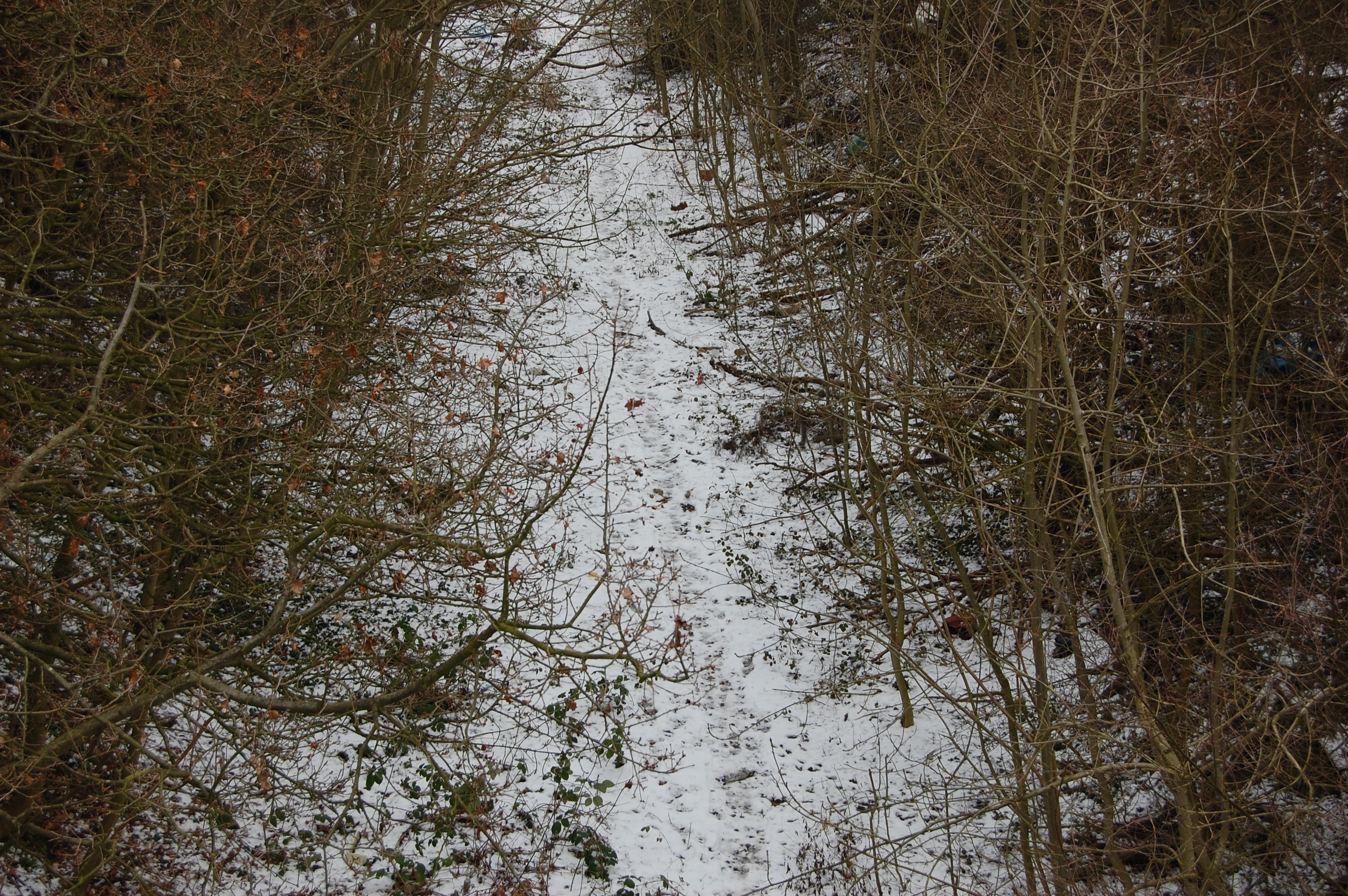

General information
- Location: Killamarsh and Upperthorpe, North East Derbyshire, England
- Grid reference: SK 449 807
- Platforms: 2

Other information
- Status: Disused

History
- Original company: LD&ECR
- Pre-grouping: Great Central Railway
- Post-grouping: LNER, British Railways

Key dates
- 1 October 1898: Opened as Killamarsh
- 1 January 1907: Renamed Upperthorpe and Killamarsh
- 7 July 1930: Closed
Location

Upperthorpe and Killamarsh was a railway station that served the villages of Killamarsh and Upperthorpe, in Derbyshire, England. It was one of three stations serving Killamarsh. The station was on the Sheffield District Railway, which ran between Sheffield Victoria and Shirebrook North on the Lancashire, Derbyshire and East Coast Railway's network of lines in the region.

== Killamarsh stations ==
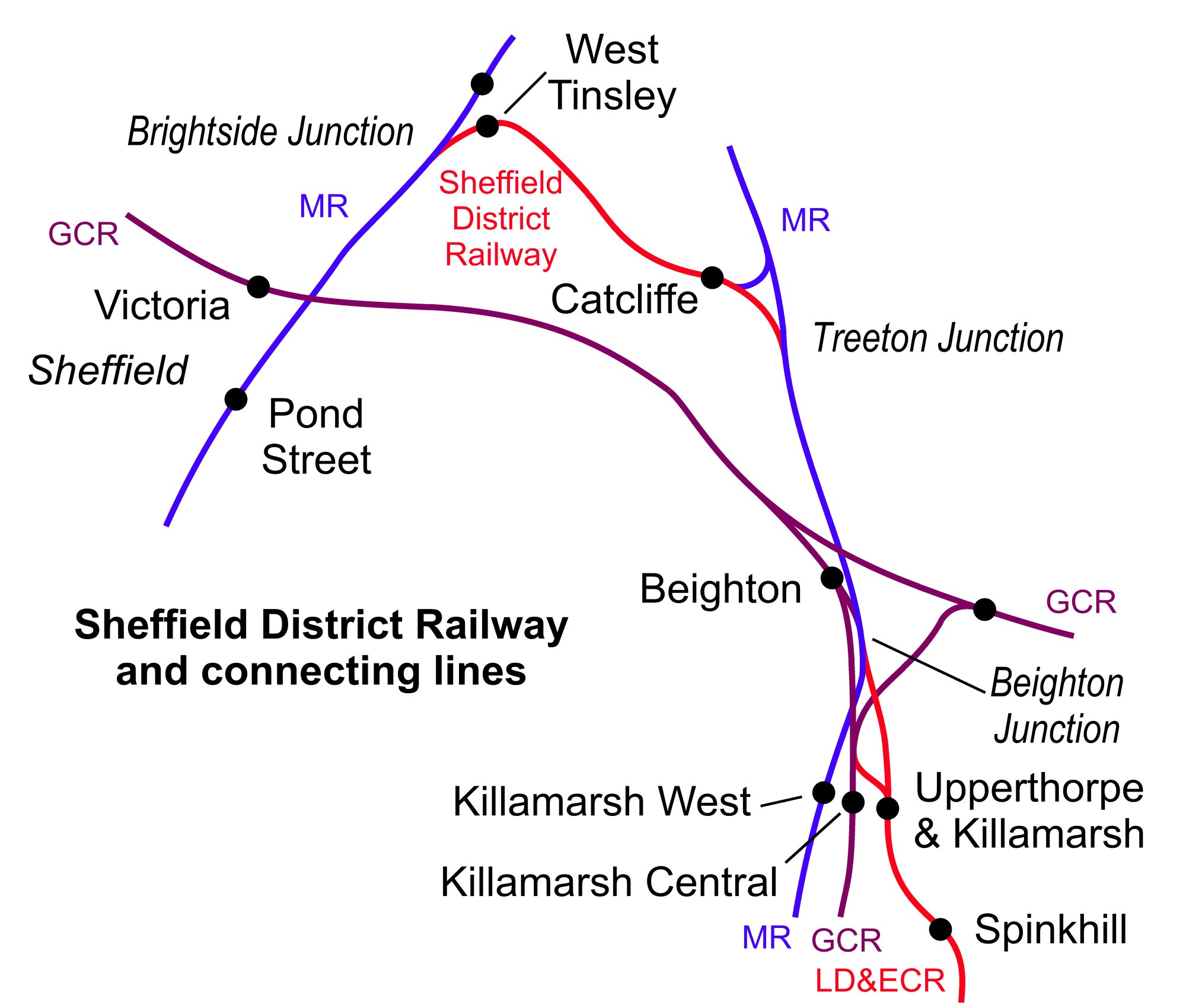
Railway stations at Killamarsh and their respective lines

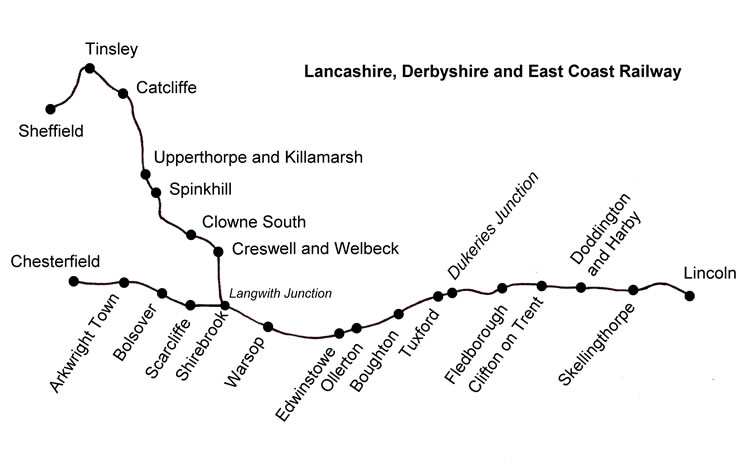
LD&ECR and Sheffield District Railway

Three stations served the village, all of which were originally named Killamarsh upon their opening:

- Killamarsh Central on the former Great Central Railway's main line between Nottingham Victoria and Sheffield Victoria
- Killamarsh West on the former Midland Railway Old Road from Chesterfield to Rotherham Masborough
- Upperthorpe and Killamarsh, which is the subject of this article.

== History ==
=== Opening and operation ===
The station was opened on the Beighton Branch of the Lancashire, Derbyshire and East Coast Railway (LD&ECR) in 1898. The LD&ECR wished to extend into Sheffield using the MS&LR's lines, but was rebuffed; instead, it joined the Midland's line at Beighton Junction. From there, it went on to join the Sheffield District Railway at Treeton Junction and thereby gain access to goods traffic in central Sheffield and to the Midland Railway's Sheffield station.

Preceding station	Disused railways	Following station
Woodhouse Mill; Line and station closed	Great Central Railway; Lancashire, Derbyshire and East Coast Railway	Spinkhill; Line and station closed

=== Closure ===
The station closed in 1930. The line itself closed to stopping passenger services on the outbreak of World War II in 1939. In the late 1980s, the station site was home to a short-lived railway preservation attempt known as the Rother Valley Railway. This was formally abandoned in 1992; the preservationists' energy and commitment were transferred to the Cleethorpes Coast Light Railway.

=== Rother Valley Railway ===
From 1988 until the early 1990s, another Rother Valley Railway had a brief existence on the site of Upperthorpe and Killamarsh station. The line had three locomotives on loan, a five-ton steam crane and a membership of over eighty. Although the line featured in a two-page article in The Railway Magazine in 1990, little seems to have happened and the society faded away.

After many years details have been published stating that the society was unable to gain agreement with the necessary local authorities, so was unable to proceed. They sought another opportunity elsewhere, which they found by taking over Cleethorpes Council's struggling miniature railway, turning it into the Cleethorpes Coast Light Railway in 1991. That "Rother Valley Railway Limited" was formally dissolved on 9 June 1992.

== The site today ==
The station fell into disuse after closure and the track on the line was completely lifted in the 1980s when the nearby Westthorpe Colliery closed. The Station Master's house on Field Lane is now a private dwelling and has no connection to the old platforms, which themselves have been demolished along with any other traces of the station. The cutting of the old line is now very overgrown and neglected with refuse; many efforts have been made to restrict access to the site through the use of fences.
