= Arthur Groves =

English footballer

Personal information
- Full name: Arthur Groves
- Date of birth: 27 September 1907
- Place of birth: Killamarsh, England
- Position: Forward

Senior career*
Years	Team	Apps	(Gls)
- Langwith Colliery
1927–1928	Halifax Town	30	(6)
1928–1932	Blackburn Rovers	65	(26)
1933–1935	Derby County	64	(17)
1935–1938	Portsmouth	80	(13)
1939	Stockport County	2	(0)
–	Atherstone Town		
–	Heanor Athletic		
Total		241	(62)
- * Club domestic league appearances and goals

Arthur Groves (27 September 1907 – 27 September 1979) was an English footballer who played in The Football League for Halifax Town, Blackburn Rovers, Derby County (£500 transfer fee), Portsmouth (£1,500 transfer fee) and Stockport County. He also played for Atherstone Town. He was born in Killamarsh.

His son, John Groves, played for Luton Town and Bournemouth in the nineteen-fifties and nineteen-sixties. Arthur's grandson is the Australian-based darts player, Loz Ryder.
