= Killamarsh West railway station =

Former railway station in South Yorkshire, England

Killamarsh West
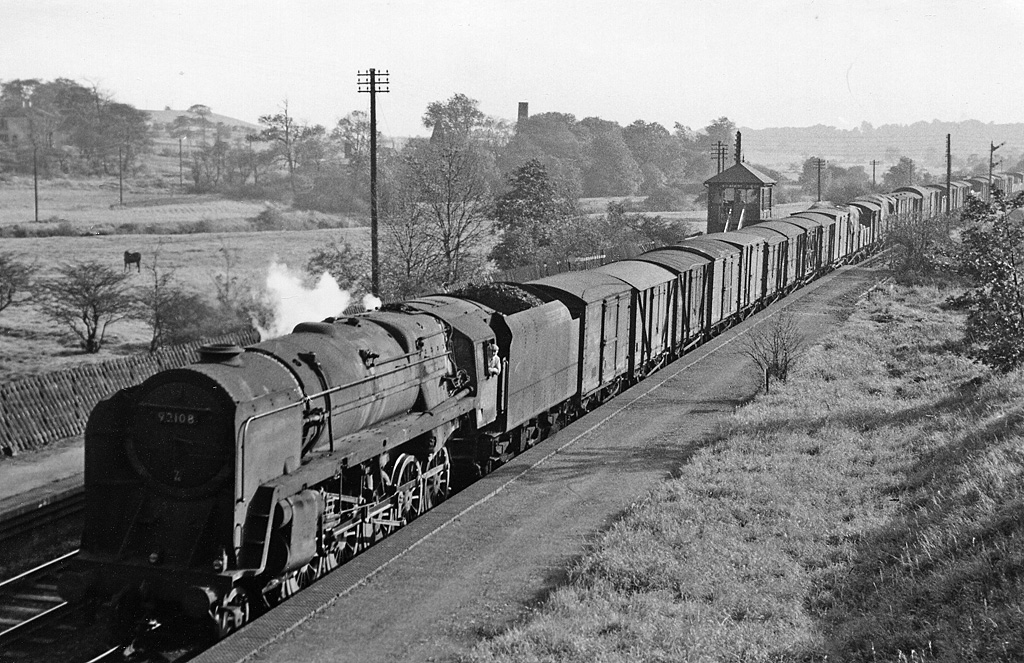
- Passing the remains of Killamarsh West in 1957

General information
- Location: Halfway, City of Sheffield, England
- Coordinates: 53.3263°N 1.3307°W
- Grid reference: SK 446 812

Other information
- Status: Disused

History
- Original company: North Midland Railway
- Pre-grouping: Midland Railway
- Post-grouping: London, Midland and Scottish Railway

Key dates
- 6 April 1841: Station opened as Killamarsh
- 2 January 1843: Closed
- 21 January 1873: Reopened
- 25 September 1950: Renamed Killamarsh West
- 1 February 1954: Station closed
Location

Killamarsh West was a railway station in Halfway, South Yorkshire, England; it was one of three stations that served the village of Killamarsh in Derbyshire.

== Killamarsh stations ==
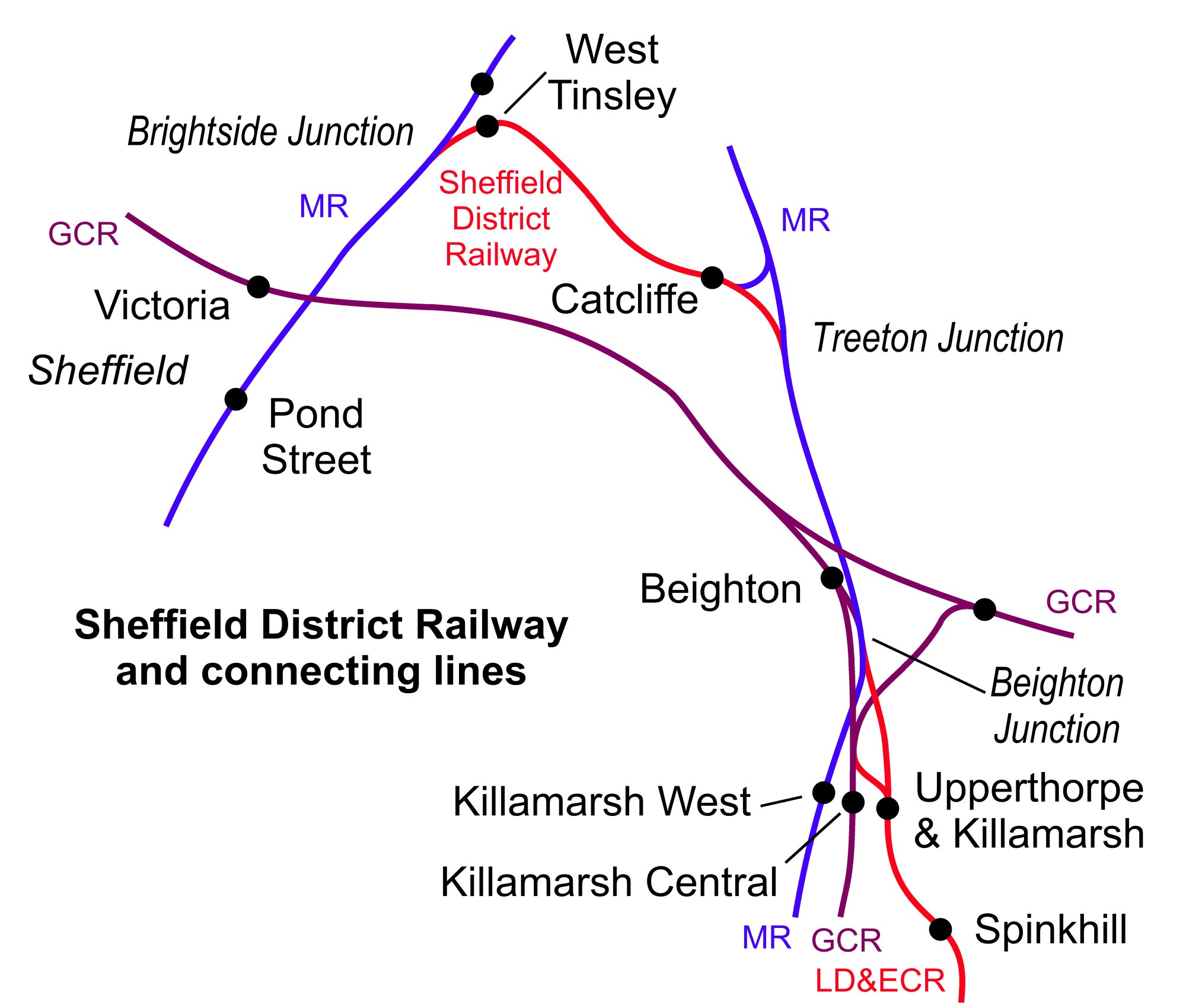
Railway stations at Killamarsh and their respective lines

Three stations served the village, all of which were originally named Killamarsh upon their opening:

- Killamarsh Central on the former Great Central Railway's main line between Nottingham Victoria and Sheffield Victoria
- Upperthorpe and Killamarsh on the former LD&ECR's Beighton Branch
- Killamarsh West, which is the subject of this article.

== History ==
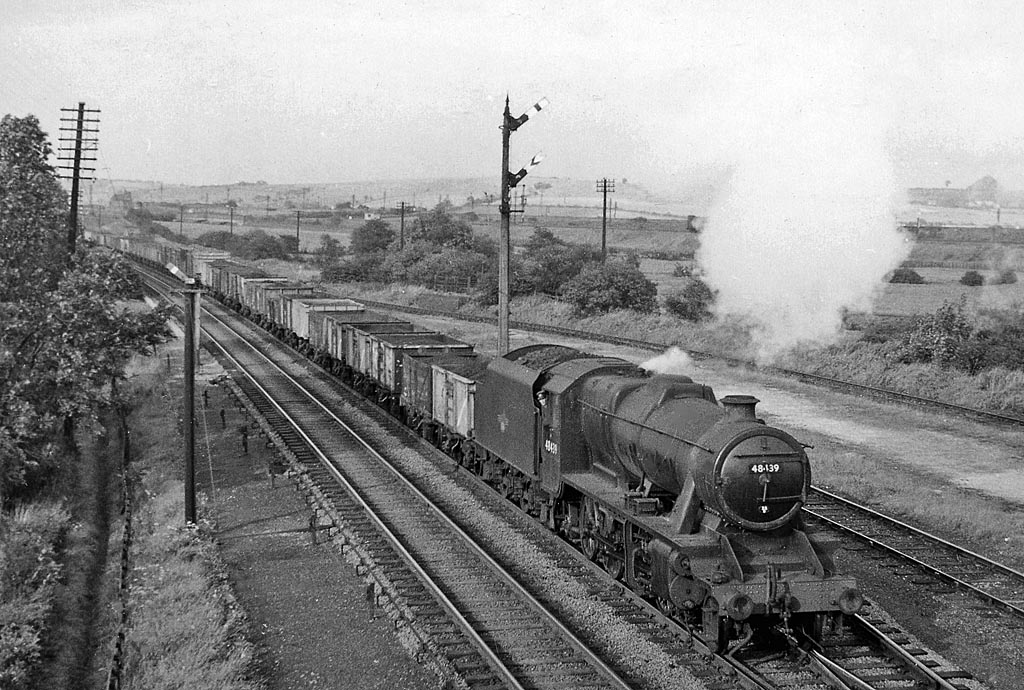
An up coal train at Killamarsh West in 1957

A station was opened on the site by the North Midland Railway on its line between Chesterfield and Rotherham, which became known as the Old Road. It was closed in 1843 by George Hudson during a period of financial difficulty.

A new station was built by the Midland Railway in 1873. Although it was commonly known as Killamarsh Midland locally, the name was not officially adopted. It was renamed Killamarsh West by British Railways in 1950.

It was of typical Midland design, brick built and timber, with a foot crossing between the platforms.

The station closed in 1954. The line is now part of the current Midland Main Line. It is used predominantly for freight, with a handful of passenger trains taking longer route from Chesterfield to Sheffield, via the Old Road and Darnall largely to retain staff route knowledge in case of diversions.

== Services ==
In 1922, passenger services calling at Killamarsh West were at their most intensive, with trains serving three destinations via three overlapping routes:

- On Mondays to Saturdays, three stopping services operated between Sheffield Midland and Chesterfield:
  - Most ran directly down the New Road, through Dronfield and not via Killamarsh West.
  - The other two services took a longer route via the Old Road. They set off north eastwards from Sheffield Midland towards Rotherham, then swung east to go south along the Old Road:
    - One of these continued past Holmes, a short distance before Masborough, then swung hard right, next stop Treeton, then all stations including Killamarsh West to Chesterfield
    - The other continued past Attercliffe Road, then swung right onto the Sheffield District Railway passing through or calling at West Tinsley and Catcliffe before Treeton; after this, they called at all stations to Chesterfield.
- On Sundays only:
  - Stopping trains ran directly between Rotherham Masborough and Chesterfield, via the Old Road.

Preceding station	Disused railways	Following station
Beighton; Line and station closed	Midland Railway; North Midland Railway "Old Road"	Eckington and Renishaw; Line and station closed

== Proposed reopening ==
In 2024, a previously approved plan to reopen the station as part of the Barrow Hill line was put on hold, following a government spending review. These plans were revived in 2025 under the South Yorkshire People's Network project, with Killamarsh expected to be a calling point on a tram-train extension of the South Yorkshire Supertram network between Sheffield and Chesterfield via Barrow Hill.

There are virtually no remains of the station today, other than a large space beside the railway line where the platforms once occupied. The site is inaccessible as the line remains open to through traffic.
