= Listed buildings in Killamarsh =

Killamarsh is a civil parish in the North East Derbyshire district of Derbyshire, England. The parish contains five listed buildings that are recorded in the National Heritage List for England. Of these, one is listed at Grade II*, the middle of the three grades, and the others are at Grade II, the lowest grade. The parish contains the town of Killamarsh and the surrounding area. All the listed buildings are in the town, and consist of a church and a cross in the churchyard, and a farmhouse and associated farm buildings.

== Key ==
| Grade | Criteria |
|---|---|
| II* | Particularly important buildings of more than special interest |
| II | Buildings of national importance and special interest |

== Buildings ==
| Name and location | Photograph | Date | Notes | Grade |
|---|---|---|---|---|
| St Giles' Church; 53.32361°N 1.30915°W | | 12th century | The church has been altered and extended through the centuries, and further additions were made in 1895–96. Most of the church is built in sandstone, and the 1895 addition is in magnesian limestone. The roof of the nave is tiled, and elsewhere the roofs have Welsh slates. The church consists of a nave, a north aisle, a south porch, a chancel and vestry, and a west tower. The tower is in Perpendicular style, with two stages, a moulded string course, diagonal buttresses, a southwest stair turret, a three-light west window, and two-light bell openings. Above these is a string course with grotesque spouts, and an embattled parapet with crocketed pinnacles. The south porch is gabled with a sundial in the gable, and the doorway is Norman, consisting of a semicircular arch with double chevron decoration, and colonnettes with foliage capitals. | II* |
| Churchyard cross 53.32352°N 1.30903°W | | Medieval | The cross is in the churchyard of St Giles' Church. The lower parts are medieval, and consist of a double-stepped plinth, on which is a large square base with chamfered corners, and a tapering rectangular shaft 1.5 metres (4 ft 11 in) high. On this is a 19th-century limestone wheel cross head. | II |
| Westhorpe Farmhouse; 53.31513°N 1.31893°W | | Early 17th century | The farmhouse is in sandstone, mainly rendered, with sandstone dressings, and a pantile roof with Welsh slate and stone slate eaves. There are two storeys and attics, and an L-shaped plan, with a front range of two bays, a two-bay rear wing, and a lean-to on the right. On the front is a gabled porch and a doorway with a chamfered surround. Some windows are mullioned, some mullions have been removed, and there are later casement windows. | II |
| Barn southeast of Westhorpe Farmhouse; 53.31499°N 1.31858°W | — | 17th century | The barn is in sandstone with quoins, and a roof of pantile, stone slate and tile. There is a single storey with overlofts and eight bays. The barn contains a full height opening, a smaller opening and blocked triangular vents. Inside there is one cruck truss. | II |
| Outbuilding south of Westhorpe Farmhouse; 53.31478°N 1.31884°W | — | 17th century | The outbuilding is in sandstone with quoins and a Welsh slate roof. There is a single storey and three bays. The building contains a large central opening and triangular vents. | II |
