= John Groves (footballer) =

English footballer

Personal information
- Full name: John Groves
- Date of birth: 16 September 1933
- Place of birth: Langwith, Derbyshire, England
- Date of death: 26 June 2017 (aged 83)
- Positions: Wing half; inside forward

Youth career
- 1950–1953: Luton Town

Senior career*
Years	Team	Apps	(Gls)
1953–1963	Luton Town	218	(16)
1963–1965	Bournemouth & Boscombe Athletic	54	(0)
- * Club domestic league appearances and goals

John Groves (16 September 1933 – 26 June 2017) was an English professional footballer best known as a player for Luton Town.

== Personal life ==
He was the son of former Halifax Town, Blackburn Rovers, Derby County and Portsmouth forward, Arthur Groves and uncle of darts player Laurence Ryder.

== Career ==
Born in Langwith, Derbyshire, Groves signed for Luton Town in 1949 and turned professional on his 17th birthday. After making his debut during the 1953–54 season, Groves made 251 appearances for the club over ten seasons, including an appearance in the 1959 FA Cup Final, before signing for Bournemouth & Boscombe Athletic in 1963. Groves ended his career with 54 league matches for Bournemouth & Boscombe.

== Honours ==
Luton Town

- FA Cup runner-up: 1958–59
