= Killamarsh Central railway station =

Disused railway station in Derbyshire, England

Coordinates: 53°19′25″N 1°19′43″W

Killamarsh Central
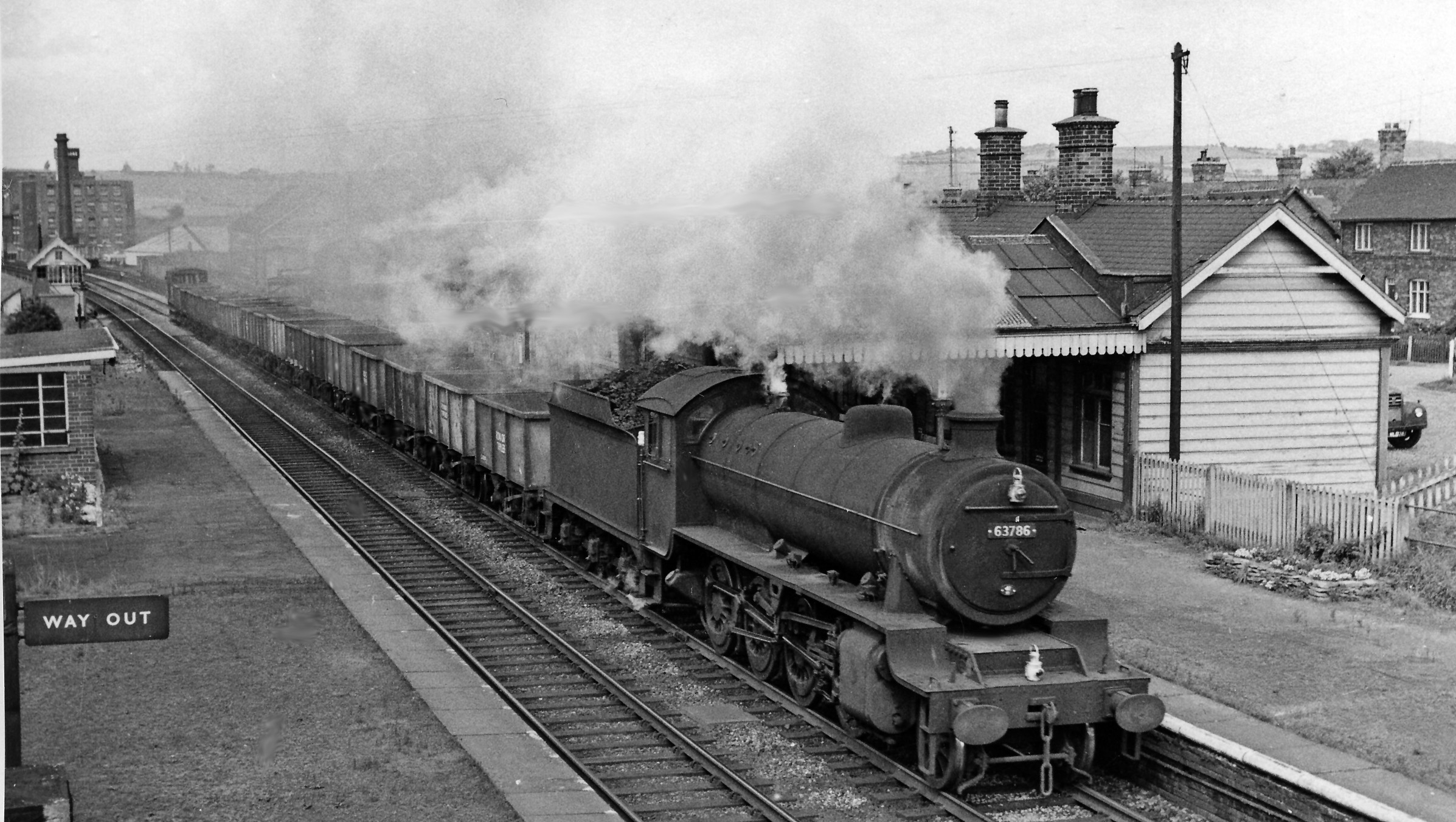
- Up iron ore empties in 1963

General information
- Location: Killamarsh, North East Derbyshire, England
- Grid reference: SK 448 809
- Platforms: 2

Other information
- Status: Disused

History
- Original company: Manchester, Sheffield and Lincolnshire Railway
- Pre-grouping: Great Central Railway
- Post-grouping: London and North Eastern Railway, British Railways

Key dates
- 1 June 1892: Opened as Killamarsh
- 25 September 1950: Renamed Killamarsh Central
- 4 March 1963: Closed to passengers
- 6 May 1963: Closed completely
- February 1983: Track lifted
Location

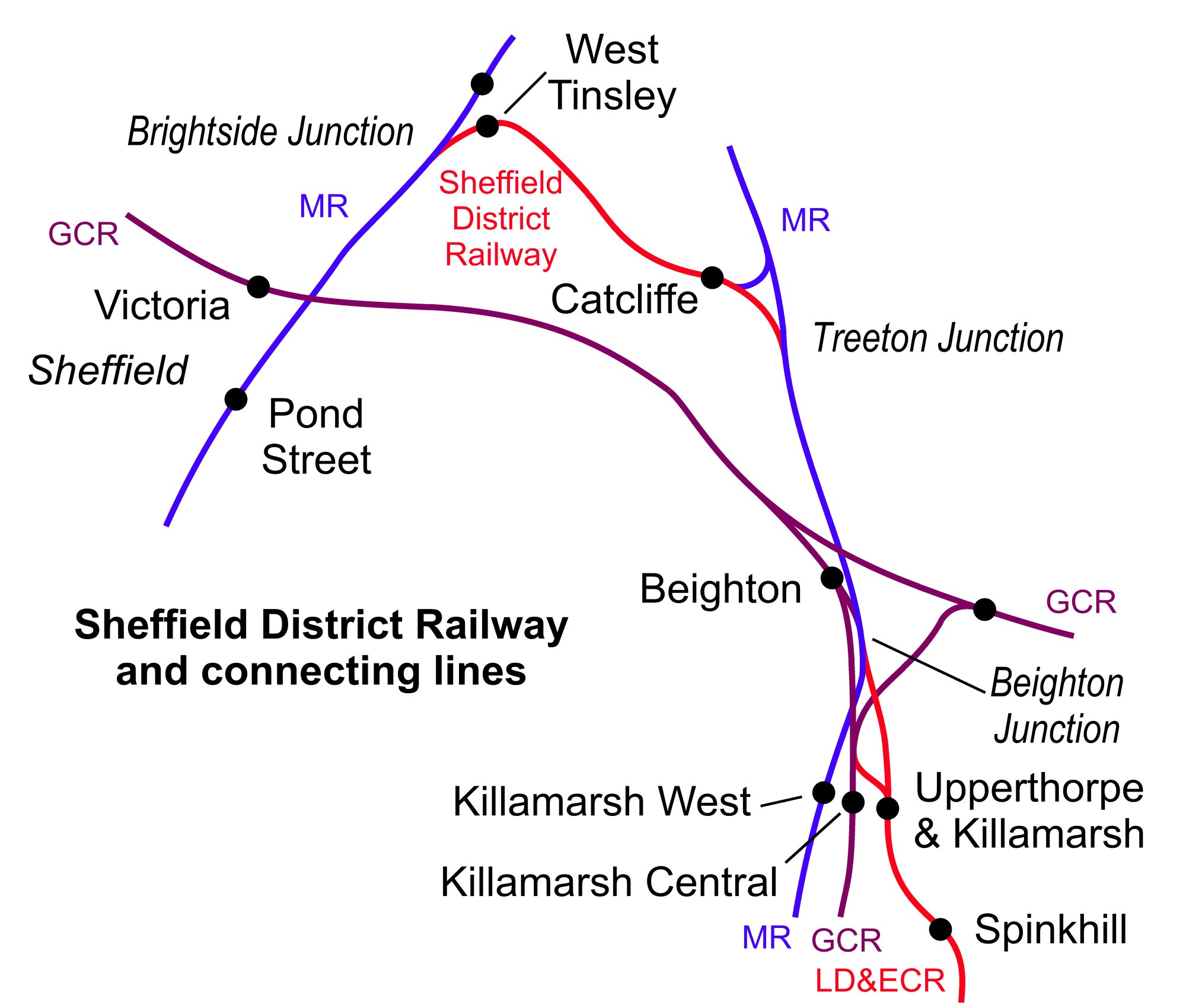
Killamarsh stations and related lines

Killamarsh Central is a disused railway station that served the village of Killamarsh, in Derbyshire, England.

== Killamarsh stations ==
Three stations served the village, all of which were originally named Killamarsh upon their opening:

- Killamarsh West on the former Midland Railway Old Road from Chesterfield to Rotherham Masborough,
- Upperthorpe and Killamarsh on the former LD&ECR's Beighton Branch, and
- Killamarsh Central which is the subject of this article.

== History ==
The station was opened in 1892 by the Manchester, Sheffield and Lincolnshire Railway when it began to build south into Derbyshire.

Despite its name, Killamarsh Central station was sited on the western edge of Killamarsh, as were all of the three stations in the village. It was renamed Killamarsh Central because it was at the centre of the three stations which served the village; it was also on the old Great Central Main Line which ran between London Marylebone and Manchester London Road, via Sheffield Victoria.

The station opened on 1 June 1892 as Killamarsh. It was renamed Killamarsh Central by British Railways on 25 September 1950 and closed on 4 March 1963. Removal of the tracks through the station was completed on 17 February 1983. The station had two platforms with a building on each; a footbridge joined the two.

The buildings were used as a film and TV prop emporium until the owner died in 2007. The buildings were still extant in 2009, but were a burnt out shell by June 2010.

Preceding station	Disused railways	Following station
Beighton; Line and station closed	Great Central Railway; Derbyshire Lines	Renishaw Central; Line and station closed

== The site today ==
The trackbed now forms part of the Trans Pennine Trail.

The station footbridge remains open as a public right of way between Station Road and Forge Lane, with the stairway to the northbound platform providing access to the Trans Pennine Trail. The northbound platform itself can be walked as part of the trail, though all its features have been removed. Access to the southbound platform and its stairway has been blocked off.
