= Billy Batty =

English footballer

Personal information
- Full name: William Batty
- Date of birth: 13 July 1886
- Place of birth: Killamarsh, Derbyshire, England
- Position: Inside forward

Youth career
- Thornecliffe
- Mettomley
- High Green Swifts

Senior career*
Years	Team	Apps	(Gls)
1907–1910	Sheffield United	38	(6)
1910–1911	Bristol City	5	(0)
1911–1912	Lincoln City		
1912–1922	Swindon Town	111	(44)
1922–1923	Barnsley	1	(0)
- * Club domestic league appearances and goals

William Batty (13 July 1886 – after 1922) was an English footballer who scored 24 goals in 85 appearances in the Football League playing for Sheffield United, Bristol City, Swindon Town and Barnsley. He played as an inside forward. He also played in Lincoln City's 1911–12 Central League title-winning side, and in the Southern League for Swindon Town, during which time he appeared four times for the Southern League representative eleven.
