= Killamarsh =

Village and civil parish in Derbyshire, England

Coordinates: 53.3205°N 1.3116°W

- Village and Civil Parish
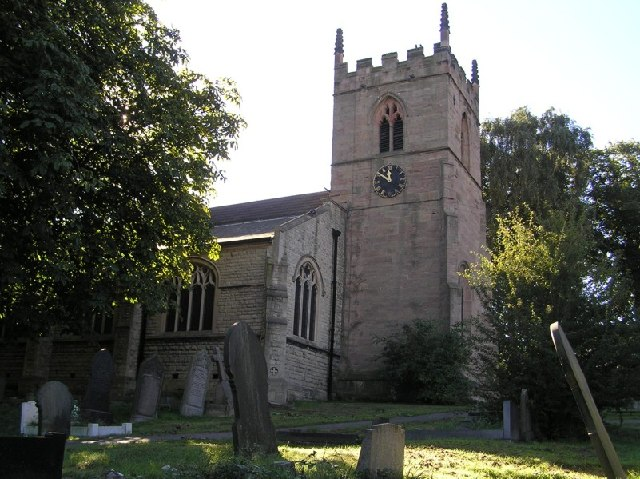
- St Giles Church

- Location within Derbyshire
- Population: 9,445 (civil parish, 2011)
- OS grid reference: SK458806
- Civil parish: Killamarsh
- District: North East Derbyshire
- Shire county: Derbyshire
- Region: East Midlands
- Country: England
- Sovereign state: United Kingdom
- Post town: SHEFFIELD
- Postcode district: S21
- Dialling code: 0114
- Police: Derbyshire
- Fire: Derbyshire
- Ambulance: East Midlands
- UK Parliament: North East Derbyshire

Killamarsh is a village and civil parish in North East Derbyshire, England, close to Derbyshire’s border with South Yorkshire. It forms part of the Sheffield urban area and lies about 8 miles south-east of the centre of Sheffield.

Killamarsh is surrounded by, in a clockwise direction from the north, Rother Valley Country Park, the village of Wales, Kiveton, Woodall, Harthill, Barlborough, Spinkhill, Renishaw, Eckington, and the (historically Derbyshire) Sheffield suburbs of Oxclose, Halfway and Holbrook.

== History ==
The name 'Killamarsh' is first attested in the Domesday Book of 1086, where it appears as Chinewoldemaresc. It appears as Kinewaldesmers in the Charter Roll for 1249. The name means 'Cynewald's marsh'.

Domesday records Killamarsh as belonging to Hascoit Musard and being valued at 12 pence. The Grade II* listed parish church of St Giles was built between the 12th and 15th centuries using sandstone. Additions were made in 1895 by J. M. Brooks in magnesian limestone. The chancel south window is restored 15th-century stained glass, and the chancel east window of 1845 is by William Warrington. A Grade II listed medieval cross stands in the graveyard. A number of public houses in Killamarsh are over 300 years old.

=== Murders ===
The village gained national attention following the notorious Killamarsh murders in 2021.

== Economy ==
The community originally grew from a farming community, self-sufficient in agricultural and dairy produce since the Middle Ages. In the 19th and 20th centuries, Killamarsh became a coal mining village as the burgeoning Sheffield iron industry demanded coal and transport links with Sheffield matured. Coal has been mined in Killamarsh since at least the 15th century, but the first major mining operation opened at Norwood resulting in an almost doubling of the Killamarsh population between 1861 and 1871. The last two "pits", Westthorpe and High Moor, are now gone, casualties of the early 1980s pit closure programme.

The river Rother which flanks Killamarsh had provided power to grain mills since the earliest times and was used by ironmongers and smiths from the late 18th century. Killamarsh Forge was owned and operated by Joseph Webster III and then Webster & Horsfall. They made crucible steel which was cast into ingots. These were then shipped to their Penns Mill plant in Walmley, who drew the special wire. This was used in the core of the second trans-Atlantic telegraph cable laid by the SS Great Eastern in 1866 as well as other equipment used in the splicing operations.

There is an industrial estate located in the Norwood area north of the town and light industrial units and a business innovation centre to the south on the site of the old Westthorpe Colliery. To the west of Killamarsh is a small animal feed mill, and the factory of Ross and Catherall, a specialist alloys supplier to the aerospace industry.

== Composition and geography ==
Killamarsh is situated on the eastern side of the Rother Valley. The centre of Killamarsh can be defined as the junction where Bridge Street meets Sheffield Road, from which point the roads lead to all other areas of the village.

== Transport ==
Killamarsh is close to Sheffield, Chesterfield and Rotherham. The village is close to junctions 30 (Barlborough) and 31 (Aston) of the M1.

Killamarsh was once served by three railway stations:

- Killamarsh West
- Killamarsh Central
- Upperthorpe and Killamarsh

The western side of Killamarsh was originally going to be significantly affected by the new HS2 route from Birmingham to Leeds, but following the government's favouring of an alternative route which will run parallel to the M1 motorway, this is no longer likely to be the case.

The South Yorkshire Supertram runs nearby at the Halfway terminus stop.

=== Cycling ===
Killamarsh has a range of beneficiaries of the Sustrans Connect2 project for creating cycle routes. The project has now drawn to a close with the final erection of two new pedestrian and cycle bridges crossing the River Rother and the railway on the border of North East Derbyshire and Sheffield.

=== Chesterfield Canal ===
The Chesterfield Canal passed through the village on its way to Kiveton via the Norwood Tunnel, which was the joint longest canal tunnel in the UK at the time of its construction. The canal fell into disrepair following the collapse of the tunnel in 1907. The remains of the Chesterfield Canal are present but housing has been built on part of the canal's original route, and the undeveloped sections are mostly public footpaths.

The planned Rother Link will connect the Chesterfield Canal at Killamarsh, via the River Rother through to the Sheffield and South Yorkshire Navigation, thus creating a new cruising ring and encouraging boats to visit the Chesterfield Canal.

=== Rother Valley Park ===
Rother Valley Country Park lies to the north of the town. It was created in the early 1980s as part of the restoration works following open cast mining of the area. Originally managed by a joint board of Sheffield MBC, Rotherham MBC, South Yorkshire MCC and Derbyshire CC, the park is now wholly managed by Rotherham. The scheme created a series of ponds and lakes, with the surrounding area landscaped to form a nature reserve and recreation areas, with facilities for water sports. The River Rother flows from the west of town and passes through the centre of the park. Gulliver's Valley, located beside the Rother Valley Park, is a theme park opened in 2020 on the site of a former colliery.

== Notable residents ==
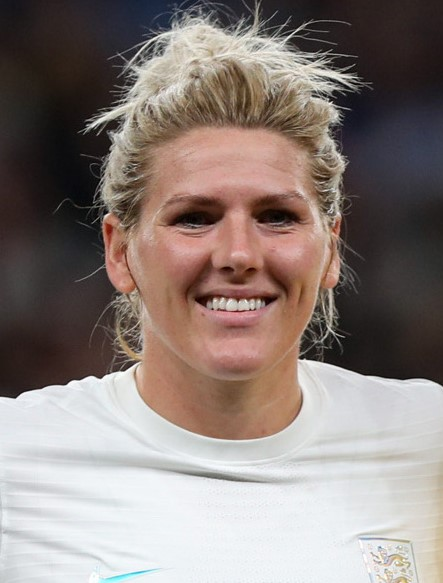
Millie Bright, 2022

- Fred Greaves (1890–1973), the first Derbyshire person to be awarded a Victoria Cross, sergeant in the Sherwood Foresters

=== Sport ===
- Billy Batty (1886–after 1922), footballer who played 156 games
- Arthur Groves (1907–1979), footballer who played 241 games
- Sidney Smith (1908–1990), professional billiards and snooker player.
- Nicky Weaver (born 1979), footballer goalkeeper, played 318 games including 172 for Manchester City.
- Richard Hinds (born 1980), played 319 games including 67 for Sheffield Wednesday.
- Millie Bright (born 1993), footballer, who has played 177 games for Chelsea F.C. Women and 88 for England women

== Sports teams ==
Killamarsh has many sports teams, in senior and junior age groups. The Killamarsh Dynamoes Athletic Football Club (KDAFC) is one of the many junior footballing sides in the area. Killamarsh Khaos Skater Hockey Club (KSHC) is a roller hockey club with age groups spanning from U10 (U12, U14, etc.) up to senior level. Killamarsh Juniors Athletic Club Institute hosts senior and junior football on its grounds as well as the Killamarsh Juniors Cricket Club (KJCC), which has age groups from U11 to three senior sides and a Sunday side.

== See also ==
- Listed buildings in Killamarsh
- List of places in Derbyshire
