= Beighton railway station =

Former railway station on the border between Derbyshire and South Yorkshire, England

Beighton
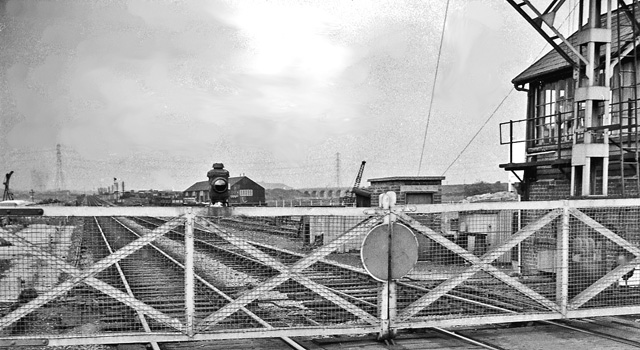
- Site of Beighton railway station in 1963

General information
- Location: Beighton, City of Sheffield; England
- Coordinates: 53.351140°N 1.335500°W
- Grid reference: SK443840
- Platforms: 2

Other information
- Status: Disused

History
- Pre-grouping: Sheffield and Lincolnshire Junction Railway; Great Central Railway
- Post-grouping: London and North Eastern Railway; London Midland Region of British Railways

Key dates
- June 1840: First station opened
- 2 January 1843: First station closed
- 12 February 1849: Second station opened
- February 1852: Second station closed temporarily
- March 1854: Second station reopened
- 1 November 1893: Second station closed
- 1 November 1893: Third station opened
- 1950: Extensively rebuilt
- 1 November 1954: Closed
Location

Beighton railway station is a former railway station near the village of Beighton on the border between Derbyshire and South Yorkshire, England.

== Three stations ==
Beighton station existed on three sites at different times:

- The first station, believed to have been little more than a halt, was opened by the North Midland Railway when it built its Chesterfield to Rotherham Masborough line, which is now predominantly a freight route. At 1 1/4 miles (2.0 km) south of Woodhouse Mill, it stood approximately halfway between what is now Beighton Junction and the overbridge, which still carries passenger trains east–west between Sheffield and Worksop. This original station was opened when the line opened in June 1840; it was not near to or convenient for the village of Beighton, and closed in January 1843.
- In 1849, the Manchester, Sheffield and Lincolnshire Railway (MS&LR) completed its Sheffield to Worksop line, which included a branch from just east of Woodhouse to join the North Midland line at what became known as Beighton Junction. They built Beighton's second station at a site on their line only, close to, but not on, the junction. The MS&LR hurried to open this branch to enable a revenue earning service to Eckington to commence and give connections to North Midland trains. This second station closed temporarily from 1852 to 1854, then continued in use until 1892.
- In 1892, the MS&LR opened its "Derbyshire Lines" route near Beighton. This would eventually become part of the Great Central Main Line. On 1 November 1893, the MS&LR closed Beighton's second station, and opened its third and final station at a site 132 yards (121 m) north west of the second site, immediately north of the Rotherham Road level crossing.

At the time, this station was within Derbyshire but following changes in boundaries, the site is now within the City of Sheffield, South Yorkshire, England.

== Context ==
All three stations were in the flood plain of the River Rother, which repeatedly led to problems. In 1950, these issues, plus the generally poor state of the station building, led British Rail to raise platform levels and undertake other remedial works.

Beighton station closed for the third and final time on 1 November 1954. It has since been demolished.

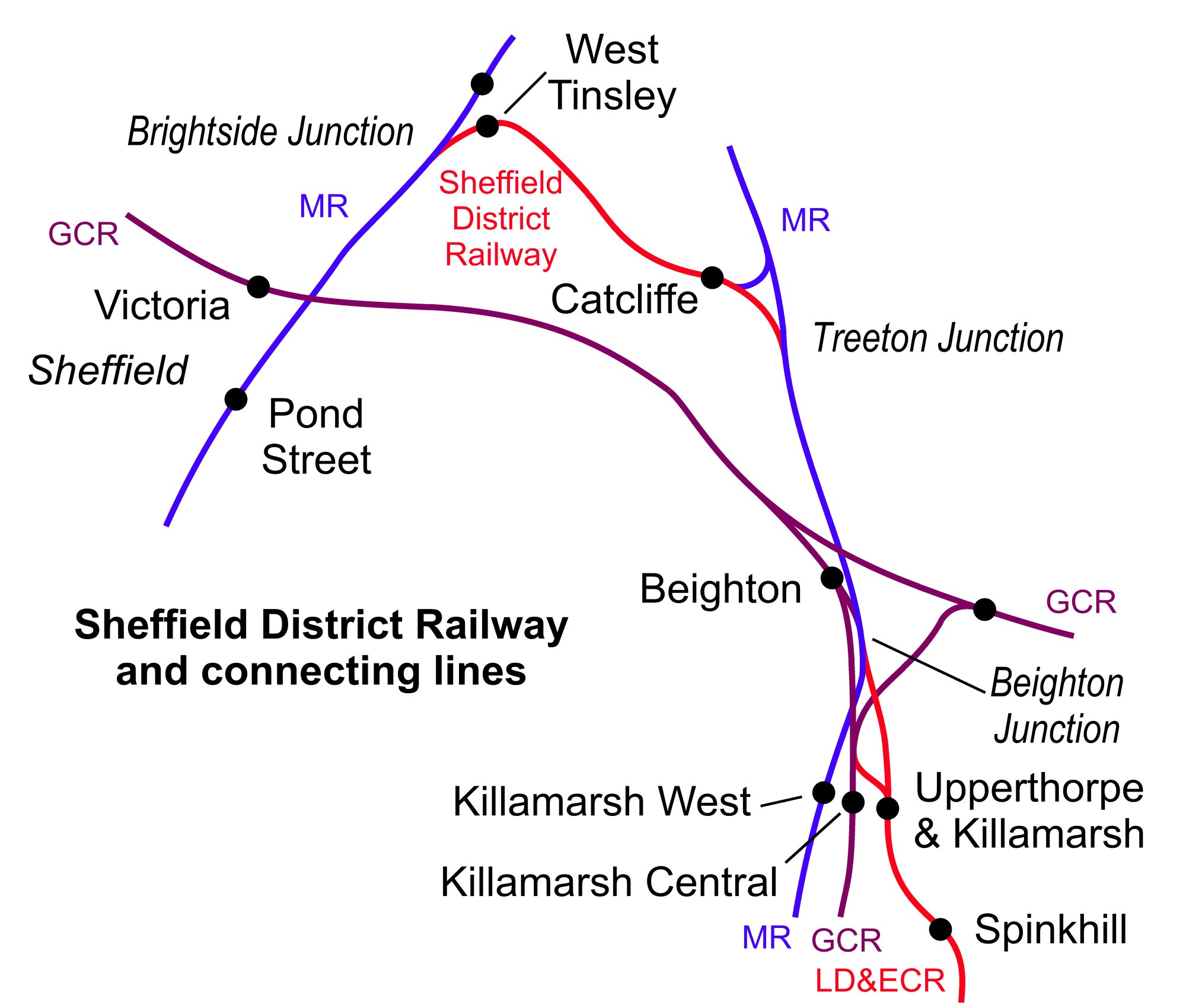
Beighton station and related lines

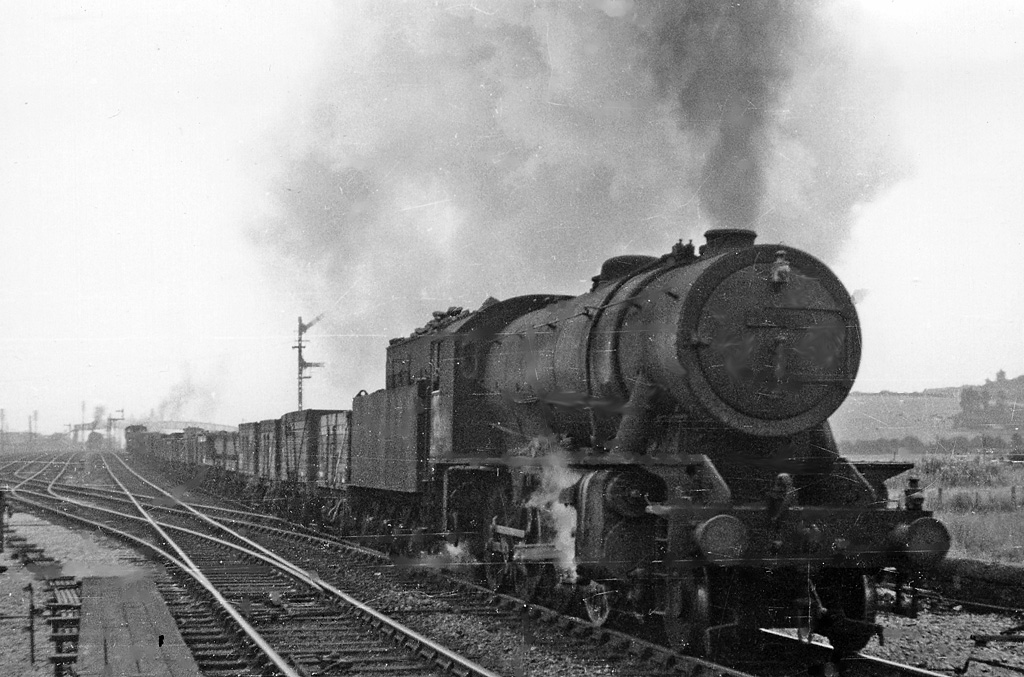
Northbound freight on the ex-GC main line in 1951

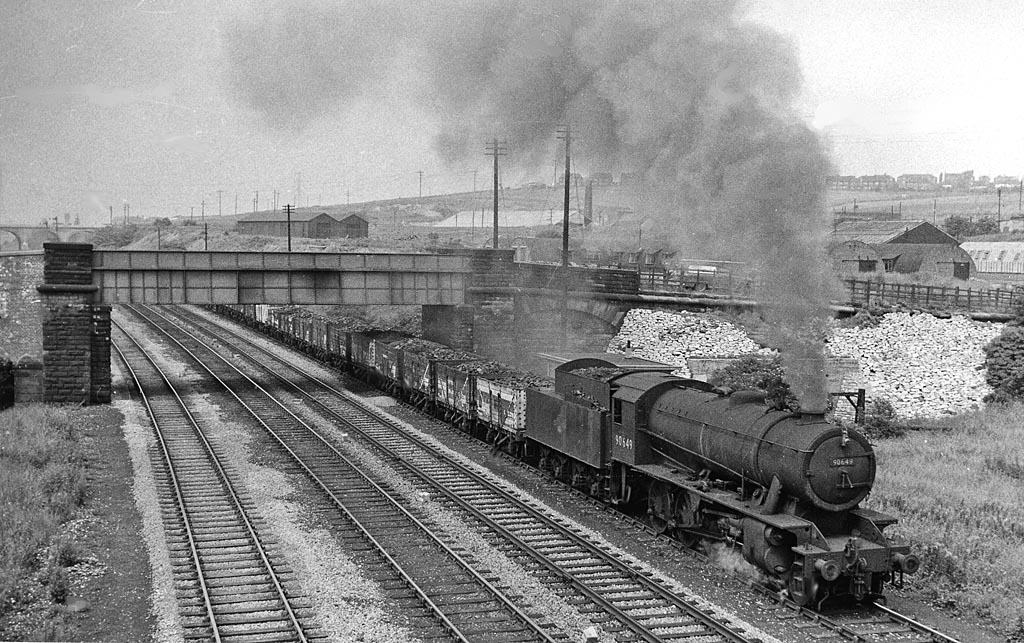
Up coal train at Beighton Junction in 1963

In 1897, the Lancashire, Derbyshire and East Coast Railway opened in a branch from Langwith Junction. The original hope had been to join the MS&LR line into Sheffield Victoria, but it was rebuffed, so a goods yard and connection to the ex-North Midland line at Beighton was built instead, though this did not touch Beighton station. The LD&ECR obtained running rights along the Midland line to Treeton Junction, and entered Sheffield via the Sheffield District Railway when it opened in 1900.

In March 2021, the 120-year-old Beighton Station Junction signal cabin, the last remaining relic of the station, was demolished, with control of the lines passing to the York Rail Operating Centre.

== Proposed reopening ==
In 2024, a previously approved plan to reopen the station as part of the Barrow Hill line was put on hold, following a government spending review. These plans were revived in 2025 under the South Yorkshire People's Network project, with Beighton expected to be a calling point on a tram-train extension of the South Yorkshire Supertram network between Sheffield and Chesterfield via Barrow Hill.

Preceding station	Disused railways	Following station
Woodhouse; Station open, line closed	Great Central Railway; Derbyshire Lines	Killamarsh Central; Line and station closed
