= Lancashire, Derbyshire and East Coast Railway Beighton Branch =

The Beighton Branch was a railway branch line built by the Lancashire, Derbyshire and East Coast Railway (LD&ECR) in north eastern Derbyshire, England.

== History ==
The line was a little over 12 miles long and ran from Langwith Junction in Derbyshire to Beighton Junction which is now in South Yorkshire.

Building started in 1892. The line opened in stages up to 1900.

The branch was occasionally referred to as the "Sheffield Branch", but the name "Beighton Branch" stuck and was widely used.

A sparse and circuitous stopping passenger service used the route to connect Sheffield with Mansfield, this was withdrawn on the outbreak of World War II.

The line closed in stages:

- 1967, middle section closed and lifted
- 1974, southern end closed and lifted
- 1984, northern end closed and lifted, except for a short length at the very end, retained as a siding.
