= West Tinsley railway station =

Disused railway station in South Yorkshire, England

West Tinsley
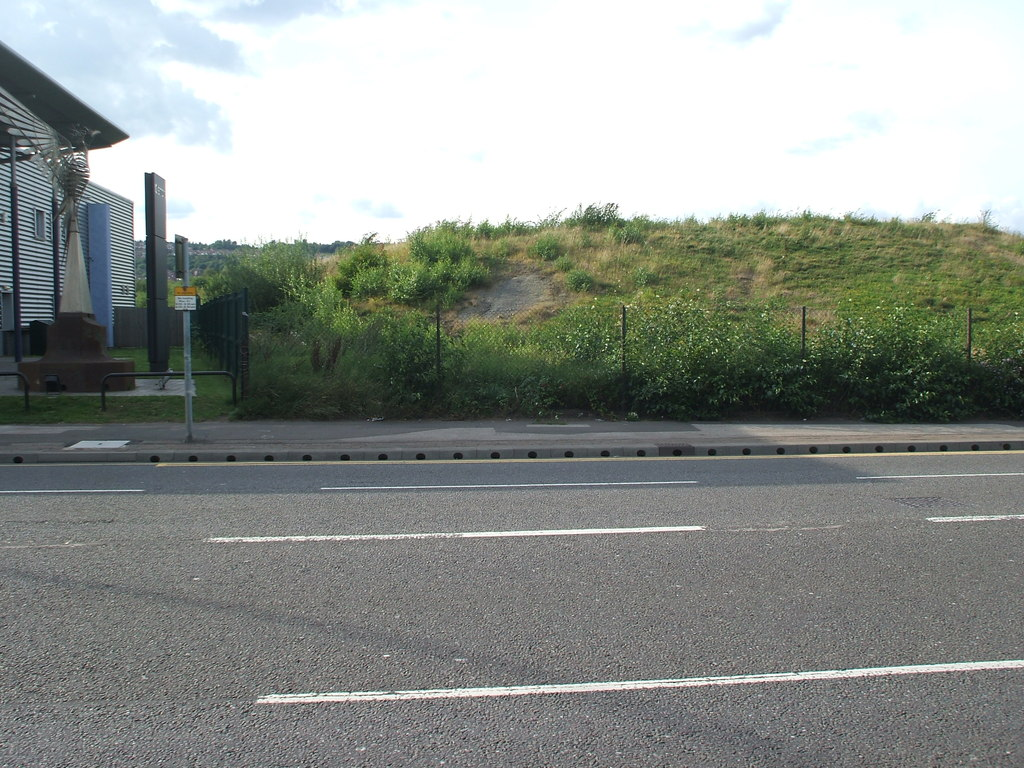
- The site of the station in 2008

General information
- Location: Tinsley, City of Sheffield; England
- Coordinates: 53.409440°N 1.409460°W
- Grid reference: SK393904
- Platforms: 2

Other information
- Status: Disused

History
- Original company: Sheffield District Railway
- Pre-grouping: Great Central Railway

Key dates
- 30 September 1900: Opened as "Tinsley Road"
- 1 July 1907: Renamed "West Tinsley"
- 11 September 1939: Closed
- 6 October 1946: Reopened
- 17 March 1947: Closed
Location

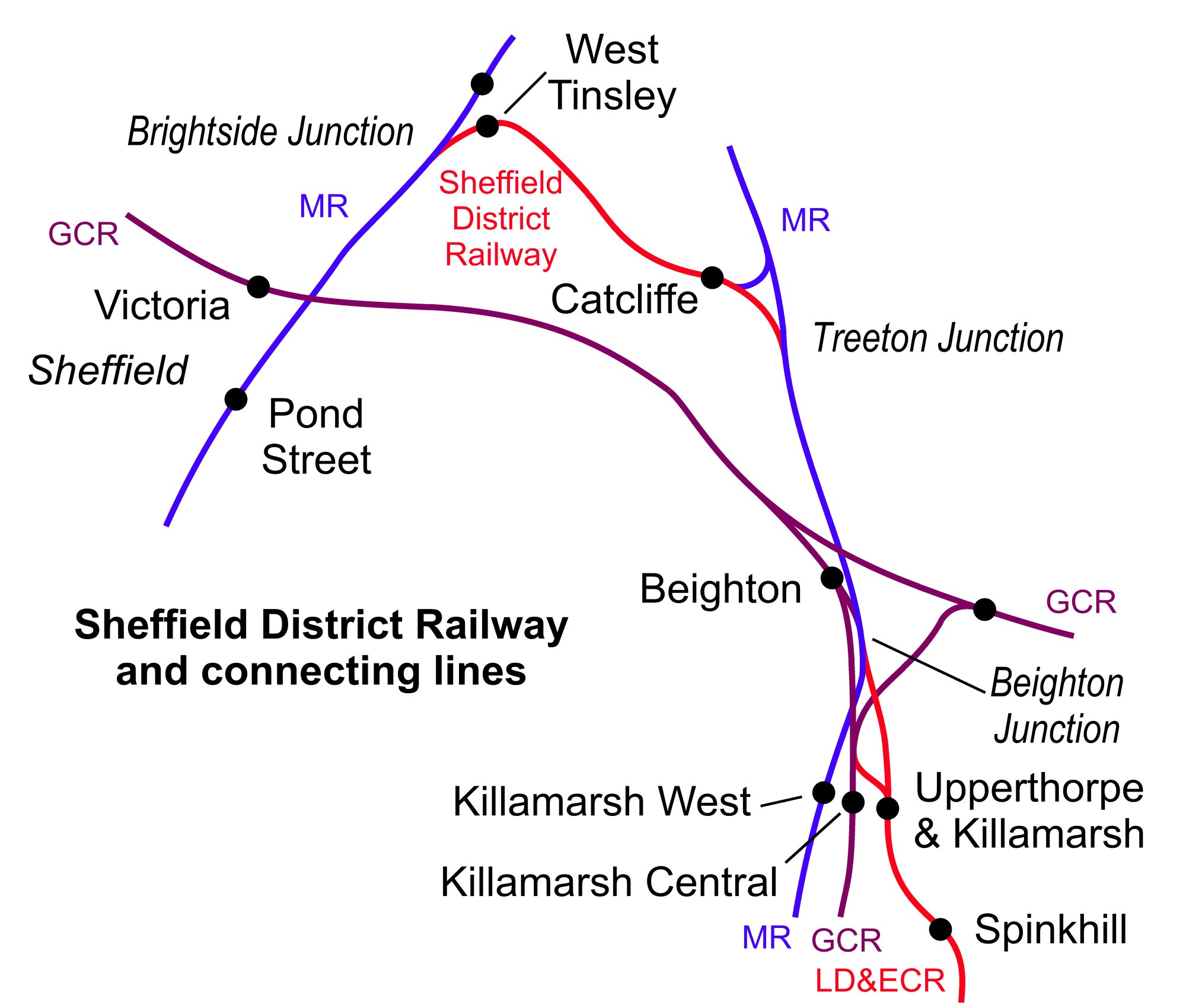
Sheffield District Railway and connecting lines

West Tinsley railway station is a former railway station in Sheffield, South Yorkshire, England.

== History ==
The station served the communities of Tinsley and Carbrook and was situated on the Sheffield District Railway between Brightside Junction and Tinsley Yard, immediately adjacent to Sheffield Road, Tinsley. It opened on 30 September 1900 as "Tinsley Road", but was renamed "West Tinsley" by the GCR on 1 July 1907. It closed on 11 September 1939. It was briefly reopened from 6 October 1946 to 17 March 1947.

The station had two wooden platforms each with wooden buildings very similar to Catcliffe, this being to reduce weight as the station was situated on top of an embankment which carried the line across the Don Valley from Brightside to Catcliffe. The station was finally closed in 1947 but it was not until the late 1960s that the buildings were demolished.

== Former passenger services ==
There never was a Sunday service from West Tinsley.

In 1922 three passenger services served West Tinsley:

- From Sheffield to Mansfield via Langwith Junction
- From Sheffield terminating at West Tinsley, and
- From Sheffield to Chesterfield via the "Old Road".

The Sheffield to Mansfield service consisted of three trains per day each way between the MR station at Sheffield and the MR station at Mansfield calling at Attercliffe Road, West Tinsley, Catcliffe, Treeton, Woodhouse Mill, the LD&ECR "Beighton Branch" to Langwith Junction (later renamed Shirebrook North), the MR station at Shirebrook (later renamed Shirebrook West), Mansfield Woodhouse and Mansfield, taking about an hour and a quarter. On Saturdays an extra lunchtime train ran out and back, calling at most stations, including West Tinsley.

Just one daily train ran from Sheffield terminating at West Tinsley. It called at Attercliffe Road and arrived at West Tinsley at 06:53, returning non-stop to Sheffield at 07:13.

To travel from Sheffield (MR) to Chesterfield (MR) via the "Old Road" it was necessary to head off north east towards Rotherham then swing south onto the "Old Road" itself which was the original North Midland Railway route from Rotherham to Chesterfield along the Rother Valley. Three trains a day ran to Holmes almost in Rotherham itself before turning sharply south to Treeton. Three trains plus an extra on Saturdays turned off before Brightside onto Sheffield District Railway metals to Treeton, however, only one of these called at West Tinsley plus one on Saturdays, the others passed without stopping.

By August 1939 the service to Mansfield remained little changed, except that Upperthorpe and Killamarsh station had closed in 1930 and not all called at Attercliffe Road.

The morning out and back from Sheffield had ceased running.

The Sheffield to Chesterfield service via West Tinsley and the Old Road had evolved to two trains per day with an extra on Saturdays, all of which called at West Tinsley.

== Present position ==
The only signs of a railway at this point are the remains of the retaining wall of the bridge over Sheffield Road on the side opposite of the road from where the station stood. The station also had a goods yard with a very large brick-built goods shed, these facilities being at the level of Sheffield Road with access from that road adjacent to the road bridge. The goods shed, after rationalisation of facilities in Sheffield, became the wooden pattern store for Edgar Allen and Company. Under the control of staff at West Tinsley station were works sidings to Edgar Allen and Company and Firth Vickers and Company.

== Abandoned plans ==
It was planned that the station be reopened under the South Yorkshire County Council Transport Plan in 1990 when it would serve the Meadowhall Leisure complex to be known as "Tivoli Gardens" (Later "Bourbon Street") but this came to nought and the project never materialised. This was to have been served by trains on a diverted Sheffield to Lincoln service which would also call at the planned Swallownest railway station with the stations at Darnall and Woodhouse being closed. Plans were changed and the Lincoln service remained as it was with the line from Brightside Junction to Shepcote Lane, (the north end of Tinsley yard) being closed and lifted.

About 0.75 miles (1.2 km) towards Rotherham along Sheffield Road can be found the site of Tinsley railway station which was on the South Yorkshire Railway.

Preceding station	Disused railways	Following station
Attercliffe Road; Line and station closed	London and North Eastern Railway; Sheffield District Railway	Catcliffe; Line and station closed
