= Catcliffe railway station =

Disused railway station in South Yorkshire, England

Catcliffe

General information
- Location: Catcliffe, Rotherham; England
- Coordinates: 53.392137°N 1.364254°W
- Grid reference: SK423885
- Platforms: 2

Other information
- Status: Disused

History
- Original company: Sheffield District Railway
- Pre-grouping: Great Central Railway
- Post-grouping: London and North Eastern Railway

Key dates
- 30 May 1900: Opened
- 11 September 1939: Closed
- 6 October 1946: Reopened
- 17 March 1947: Closed
Location

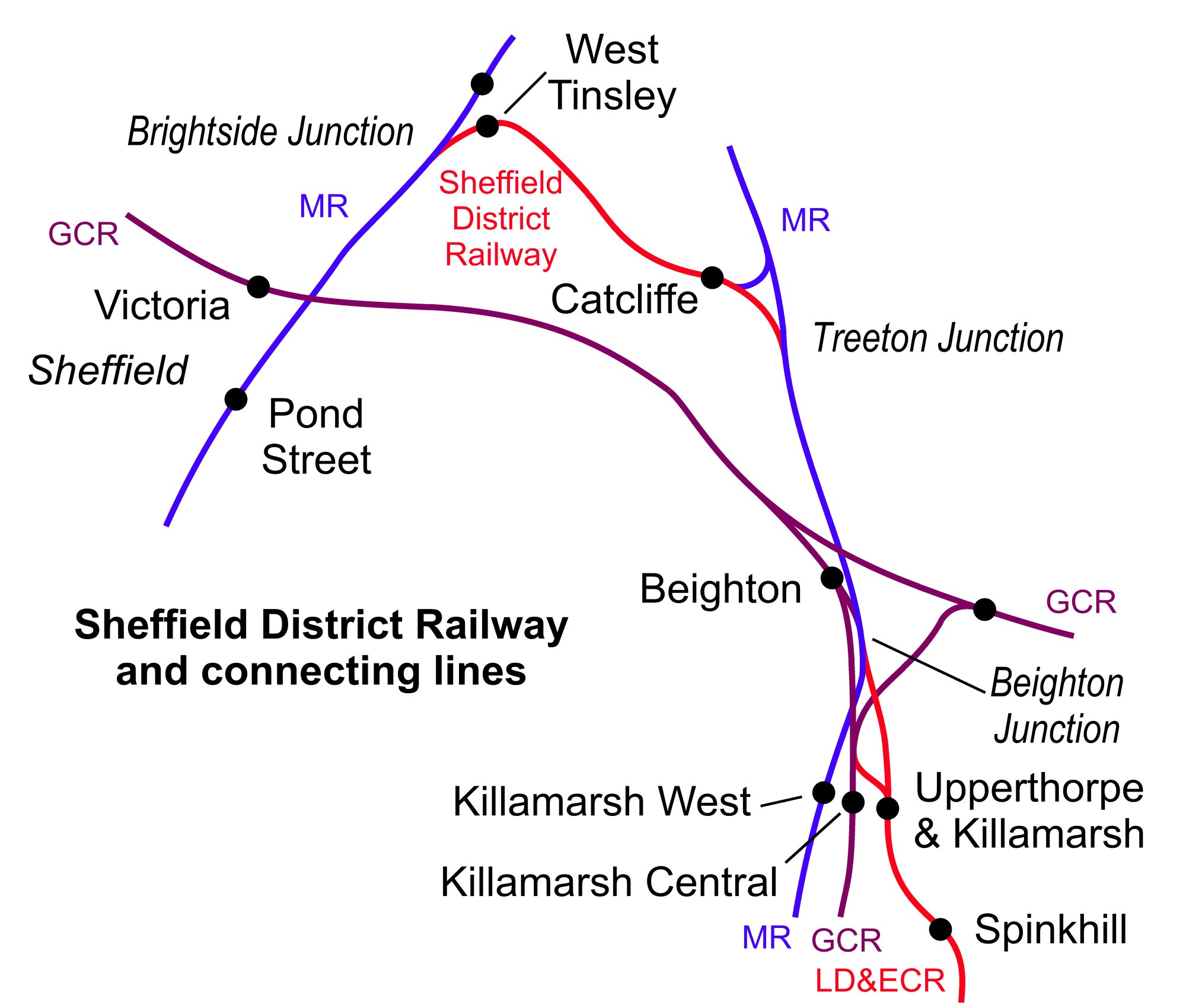
Sheffield District Railway and connecting lines

Catcliffe railway station is a former railway station in the Catcliffe area of Rotherham, South Yorkshire, England.

== History ==
The station was located on the Sheffield District Railway, just over 1 mile (1.6 km) north of its junction with the North Midland Railway line at Treeton Junction.

The line was carried on a 9-arch brick-built viaduct over the Rother Valley. The station was constructed at the northern end of this, near to the village. The station was noted for its bleak and isolated location which earned it the name "Klondyke" from the local population. Both station and platforms were built of wood. The awnings were of the distinctive LD&ECR style. The platforms and their supports closely resembled those at Boughton and Dukeries Junction.

The station was opened on 30 April 1900 and closed on 11 September 1939. It was briefly reopened from 6 October 1946 to 17 March 1947.

== Former passenger services ==
There never was a Sunday service from Catcliffe.

In 1922 two passenger services served Catcliffe:

- From Sheffield to Mansfield via Langwith Junction, and
- From Sheffield to Chesterfield via the "Old Road".

The Sheffield to Mansfield service consisted of three trains per day each way between the MR station at Sheffield and the MR station at Mansfield calling at Attercliffe Road, West Tinsley, Catcliffe, Treeton, Woodhouse Mill, the LD&ECR "Beighton Branch" to Langwith Junction (later renamed Shirebrook North), the MR station at Shirebrook (later renamed Shirebrook West), Mansfield Woodhouse and Mansfield, taking about an hour and a quarter. On Saturdays an extra lunchtime train ran out and back, calling at Catcliffe northbound only.

To travel from Sheffield (MR) to Chesterfield (MR) via the "Old Road" it was necessary to head off north east towards Rotherham then swing south onto the "Old Road" itself which was the original North Midland Railway route from Rotherham to Chesterfield along the Rother Valley. Three trains a day ran to Holmes almost in Rotherham itself before turning sharply south to Treeton. Three trains plus an extra on Saturdays turned off before Brightside onto Sheffield District Railway metals to Treeton, however, only one of these called at Catcliffe plus one on Saturdays, the others passed without stopping.

By August 1939 the service to Mansfield remained little changed, except that Upperthorpe and Killamarsh railway station had closed in 1930 and not all called at Attercliffe Road.

The Sheffield to Chesterfield service via Catcliffe and the Old Road had evolved to two trains per day with an extra on Saturdays, all of which called at Catcliffe.

Preceding station	Disused railways	Following station
West Tinsley; Line and station closed	London and North Eastern Railway; Sheffield District Railway	Treeton; Line and station closed
