= Treeton railway station =

Disused railway station in South Yorkshire, England

Treeton
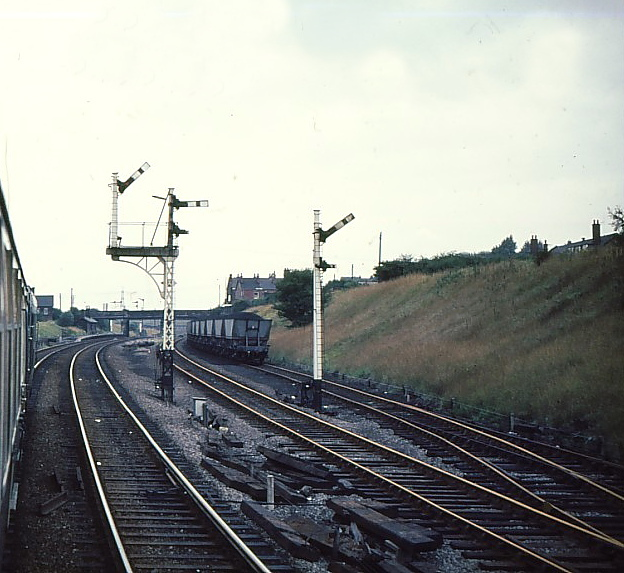
- Site of the former station (1970)

General information
- Location: Treeton, Metropolitan Borough of Rotherham; England
- Coordinates: 53.385215°N 1.355730°W
- Grid reference: SK429877
- Platforms: 2

Other information
- Status: Disused

History
- Original company: North Midland Railway
- Pre-grouping: Midland Railway
- Post-grouping: LMSR; London Midland Region of British Railways

Key dates
- 6 April 1841: Opened
- 2 January 1843: closed
- 1 October 1884: new station opened
- 29 October 1951: Closed for regular services
Location

Treeton railway station is a former railway station in the centre of Treeton, Rotherham, England.

== History ==
The station was situated on the North Midland Railway's line between Rotherham Masborough and Chesterfield, widely known as "The Old Road". This line, which remains well used by freight, follows the Rother Valley. Treeton was a coal-mining village, though Treeton Colliery closed in 1990.

The original Treeton station opened on 6 April 1841 but closed the following year. A new station, on the same site, was opened on 1 October 1884 and closed on 29 October 1951, although it was used for a small number of excursion trains after that date.

The line here consisted of four tracks. The platforms served the centre two with access by steps from the adjacent road bridge. The goods lines were routed to the rear of the platforms in an arrangement similar to that at Brightside in Sheffield.

The station was located between Rotherham Masborough and Woodhouse Mill.

The stationmaster's house was situated at 8, Station Road, opposite the Station Hotel.

== Passenger services ==
In 1922 passenger services calling at Treeton were at their most intensive, with trains serving four destinations via five routes:

- On Sundays only
  - stopping trains plied between Rotherham Masborough and Chesterfield (MR)
- On Mondays to Saturdays three stopping services plied between Sheffield (MR) and Chesterfield
  - most ran direct down the "New Road" through Dronfield and went nowhere near Treeton
- the other two set off north east from Sheffield (MR) towards Rotherham then swung east to go the "long way round" via the "Old Road"
  - one of these continued past Holmes, a short distance before Masboro' then swung hard right, next stop Treeton, heading south
  - the other continued past Attercliffe Road then swung right onto the Sheffield District Railway passing through or calling at West Tinsley and Catcliffe before Treeton
- a further service set off north east from Sheffield (MR) and used the Sheffield District Railway, then called at Treeton on its way to Mansfield (MR) via Woodhouse Mill then the LD&ECR's "Beighton Branch" to Langwith Junction.

Services using the Sheffield District Railway ended at the outbreak of WW2, with a few months revival from 6 October 1946 to 17 March 1947.

| Preceding station | Disused railways | Following station |
|---|---|---|
| Woodhouse Mill; Line and station closed | Midland Railway; North Midland Railway | Rotherham Masborough; Line and station closed |
| Woodhouse Mill; Line and station closed | Midland Railway; North Midland Railway | Holmes; Line and station closed |
| Woodhouse Mill; Line and station closed | Great Central Railway; LDECR | Catcliffe; Line and station closed |
