= Creswell and Welbeck railway station =

Former railway station in Derbyshire, England

Coordinates: 53.2607°N 1.2250°W

Creswell and Welbeck
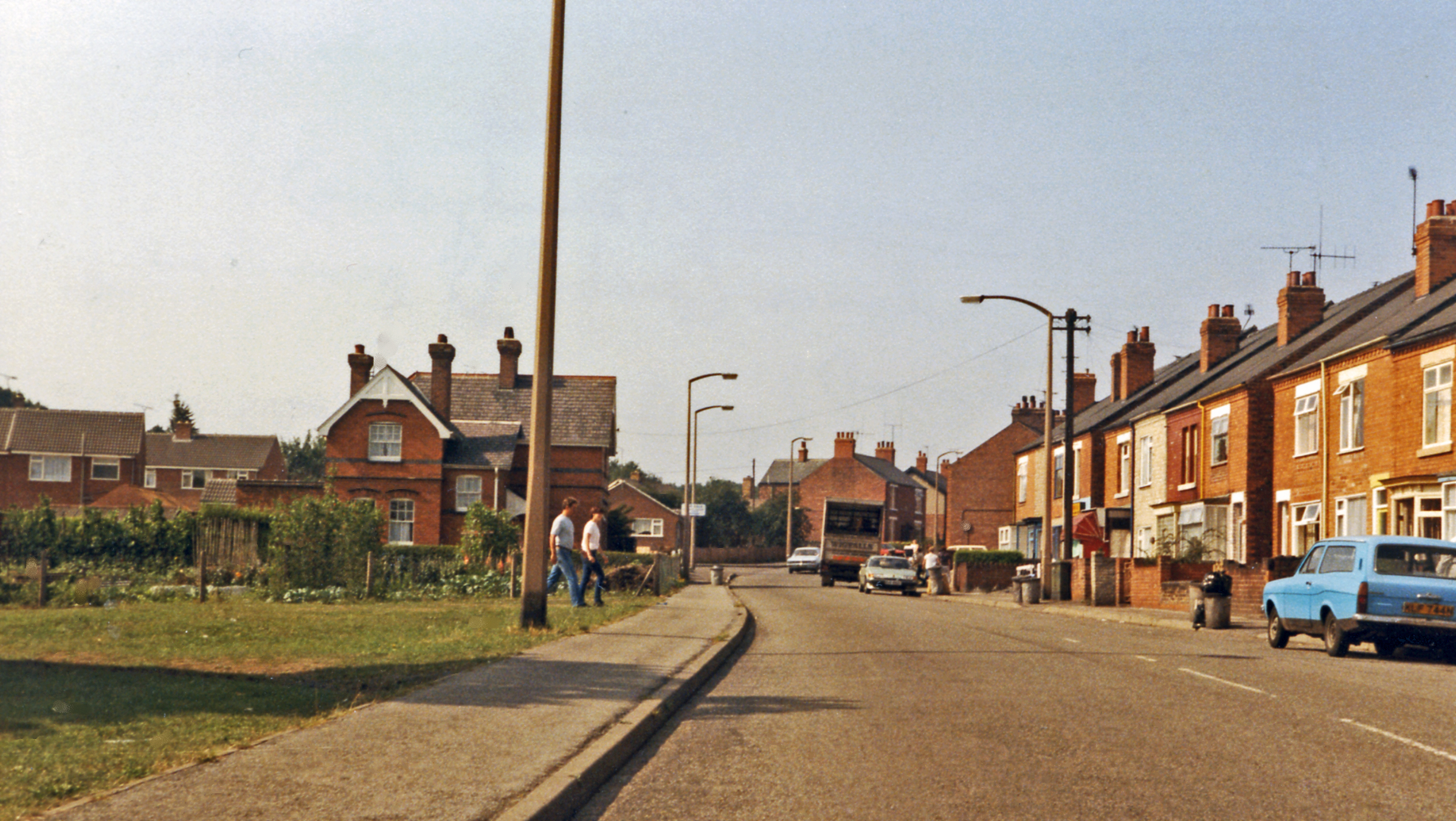
- Location of the station (1983)

General information
- Location: Bolsover; England
- Grid reference: SK 518 739
- Platforms: 2

Other information
- Status: Disused

History
- Original company: Lancashire, Derbyshire and East Coast Railway
- Pre-grouping: Great Central Railway
- Post-grouping: London and North Eastern Railway; British Railways

Key dates
- 1 June 1897: Opened as Cresswell
- 1 September 1897: renamed Creswell for Welbeck
- 10 September 1939: Closed to passengers
- 4 April 1950: Signalbox abolished
Location

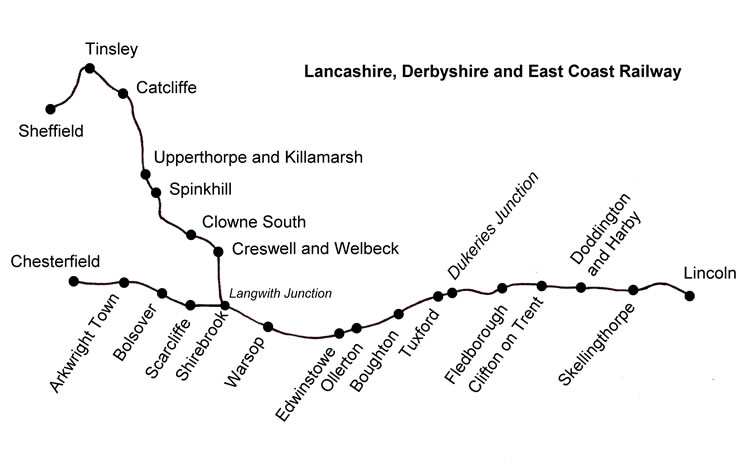
LD&ECR and Sheffield District Railway

Creswell and Welbeck railway station used to serve the village of Creswell, in north eastern Derbyshire, England.

== See also ==
Three stations have included a version of "Creswell" in their name:

- Creswell and Welbeck, which is the subject of this article,
- Creswell, formerly known as "Elmton & Creswell", which is on the same street as Creswell and Welbeck, and
- Cresswell in Staffordshire

== History ==
The station was opened by the LD&ECR on its Beighton Branch on 1 June 1897. At first it was named simply "Cresswell" then "Creswell for Welbeck" and later "Creswell and Welbeck". Locally it was known as "Top Station" to distinguish it from "Bottom Station" which was the ex-Midland Railway Elmton and Creswell station further down Elmton Road. The August 1939 Bradshaw continued to list the station as "Cresswell and Welbeck."

The station had wooden platforms and appears from one of the rare photographs of the site to have been built of wood. The characteristic and striking LD&ECR awnings closely resemble the Sheffield District Railway stations at Catcliffe and West Tinsley. The equally characteristic station lamps match those visible at Arkwright Town, among others.

From Langwith Junction the line ran northwards parallel to the Midland Railway's Nottingham Midland to Worksop line for about two miles, then veered north west to Creswell. Curiously, "Elmton and Creswell" station was nearer Welbeck than "Creswell and Welbeck" station which was in turn nearer Elmton than "Elmton and Creswell".The line then climbed at 1 in 100 (10 ‰) to Clowne South.

The station closed to passengers in September 1939, and goods some time thereafter. The station signalbox, which had a Railway Signalling Company 28 lever frame, was abolished on 4 April 1950.

The line through the site was closed completely in 1967 when it was diverted further South and severed further North in connection with building the M1 motorway. All tracks have since been lifted and the station demolished, though the characteristic LD&ECR stationmaster's house still stands, as can be seen on the accompanying photograph.

=== Stationmasters ===
- Ephraim Russon 1897 - 1930
- Lewis Geradine 1930 - 1939 (formerly station master at Navenby)

Preceding station	Disused railways	Following station
Clowne South; Line and station closed	Great Central Railway; LD&ECR	Shirebrook North; Line and station closed
