= Swallownest railway station =

Coordinates: 53.3561°N 1.3259°W

Swallownest railway station was a planned railway station which was intended to serve the growing townships of Aston and Swallownest east of Sheffield. It appeared in the British Railways Working Timetable very briefly in the Autumn changes in 1993 being withdrawn from them at the following change (Spring 1994).

== Proposal ==
The plan was to build a small station at the point where the line from Sheffield Victoria to Worksop passed beneath the Swallownest to Beighton road (Chesterfield Road) on the south side of the villages, approximately one mile west of the site of the old Waleswood Station, which had closed in 1955. As part of the plan to increase rail usage in the area and with the expansion of Swallownest towards the line, this was considered the best location for a station which could then be incorporated into the timetable.

On the original maps provided with the transport plan the station was situated east of the road bridge to enable a chord line to be built from the Midland Railway "old road", south of Treeton to the Great Central line, diverting trains via Brightside Junction and the Sheffield District Railway to reach this point before using the chord to return to the Great Central. This plan also involved the reopening of West Tinsley as Meadowhall (Tivoli Gardens), the name coming referring to a leisure park planned for the adjacent site, which was never built. This would also involve the closure of Darnall and Woodhouse. Because of South Yorkshire PTE's policy of developing railways and not closing stations, this was revised and it was decided to retain the line and service as it was, the Sheffield District line from Brightside Junction being closed and eventually lifted as far as Shepcote Lane Junction at the north end of Tinsley Yard.

Although the station appeared in the working timetable, it never appeared in the public timetable or on other station timetables in the area. This showed all trains, in both directions, stopping. However, as the station was not built, it was withdrawn from the timetable at the following spring changes.
