= Meadowhall =

Meadowhall can refer to:

- Meadowhall, an area of Sheffield
- Meadowhall Interchange, a railway station, tram and bus stop in Sheffield
- Meadow Hall and Wincobank railway station, a disused railway station in Sheffield
- Meadowhall Shopping Centre, a shopping centre in Sheffield
- Wincobank and Meadow Hall, a disused railway station in Sheffield
