= Tinsley railway station =

Disused railway station in South Yorkshire, England

Tinsley
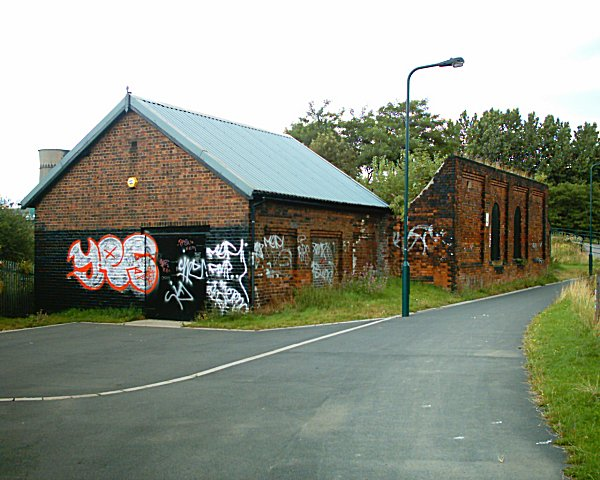
- Tinsley pump house and derelict outbuilding

General information
- Location: Tinsley, City of Sheffield, England
- Coordinates: 53.412220°N 1.405010°W
- Grid reference: SK396907
- Platforms: 2

Other information
- Status: Disused

History
- Original company: South Yorkshire Railway
- Pre-grouping: Manchester, Sheffield and Lincolnshire Railway, Great Central Railway

Key dates
- March 1869: Opened
- 29 October 1951: Closed
Location

Tinsley railway station served the growing community of Tinsley, in Sheffield, South Yorkshire, England.

== History ==
The station was designed by the company architect John Holloway Sanders and was opened in March 1869. It also served the workers at the nearby steelworks, which had moved to or had been founded in the lower Don Valley following major changes in manufacturing methods in the mid-to-late 19th century.

The station, opened by the South Yorkshire Railway, was built on the line between Sheffield Victoria and Barnsley and became a junction station with the opening of the line from Tinsley Junction (later Tinsley South Junction) to the original Rotherham station by the Manchester, Sheffield and Lincolnshire Railway.

The station was located by the main Sheffield to Rotherham road in Tinsley, now on the Sheffield side of M1 by junction 34.

The station had two platforms, flanking the running lines, and was surrounded by sidings belonging to steel works, in particular Hadfields. This was also the site of the siding, to the rear of the Barnsley-bound platform; the "Tinsley Banker", a locomotive, or sometimes locomotives, whose job was to assist (bank/push) trains up the gradients to Barnsley.

The Tinsley layout was completed with the opening of the Tinsley Curve, which enabled trains to run directly from the Blackburn Valley line to Rotherham.

The station was closed on 29 October 1951.

Preceding station	Disused railways	Following station
Broughton Lane	Eastern Region of British Railways; Great Central Railway	Meadow Hall and Wincobank
Broughton Lane	Eastern Region of British Railways; Sheffield Victoria-Doncaster Line	Rotherham Central

== The site today ==
The station buildings are still extant near to the new footbridge, which crosses over the line and Sheffield Supertram. The tram now runs along this part of the old line and the nearest stop is Tinsley/Meadowhall South.
