= Broughton Lane railway station =

Disused railway station in South Yorkshire, England

Broughton Lane
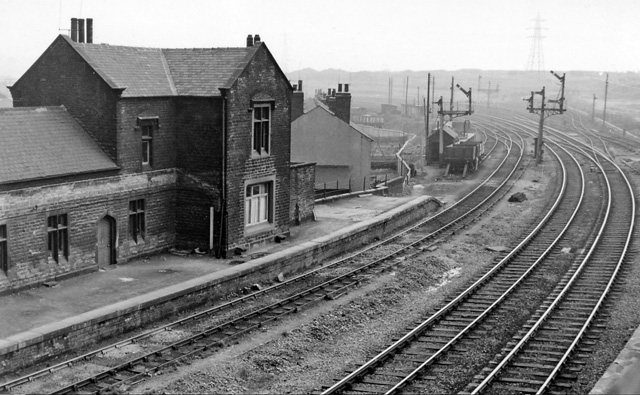
- View NE, towards Rotherham in 1961

General information
- Location: Carbrook, City of Sheffield; England
- Coordinates: 53.399720°N 1.416120°W
- Grid reference: SK389893
- Platforms: 2

Other information
- Status: Disused

History
- Original company: South Yorkshire Railway
- Pre-grouping: Manchester, Sheffield and Lincolnshire Railway, Great Central Railway
- Post-grouping: London and North Eastern Railway; London Midland Region of British Railways

Key dates
- 1 August 1864: Opened
- 3 April 1956: Closed
Location

Broughton Lane railway station was a railway station in Sheffield, South Yorkshire, England. The station served the communities of Darnall, Attercliffe and Carbrook and was one of those opened on 1 August 1864 with the South Yorkshire Railway's extension south from Tinsley Junction to Woodburn Junction where it met the Manchester, Sheffield and Lincolnshire Railway (MS&LR). The day the line was opened the SYR became part of the MS&LR. This link allowed the MS&LR access to Barnsley and Rotherham from Sheffield Victoria.

The station, with its main access by steps from Broughton Lane bridge, possessed two flanking platforms although was surrounded by sidings. The station closed on 3 April 1956 and there are now no signs of it ever existing. In the 1960s a new line was built from near Broughton Lane into the newly opened Tinsley Marshalling Yard and shortly afterwards this was electrified. The site of the station is below the new Greenland Road viaduct over the line and canal near the foundations of the old bridge. Sheffield Supertram now uses the site and the nearest tram stop is near the local arena. The sign for Broughton Lane Junction still exists and is visible from the Supertram tracks.

Preceding station	Disused railways	Following station
Attercliffe	Eastern Region of British Railways; Great Central Railway; Sheffield Victoria-Doncaster Line	Tinsley
