= Attercliffe railway station =

Disused railway station in South Yorkshire, England

Attercliffe
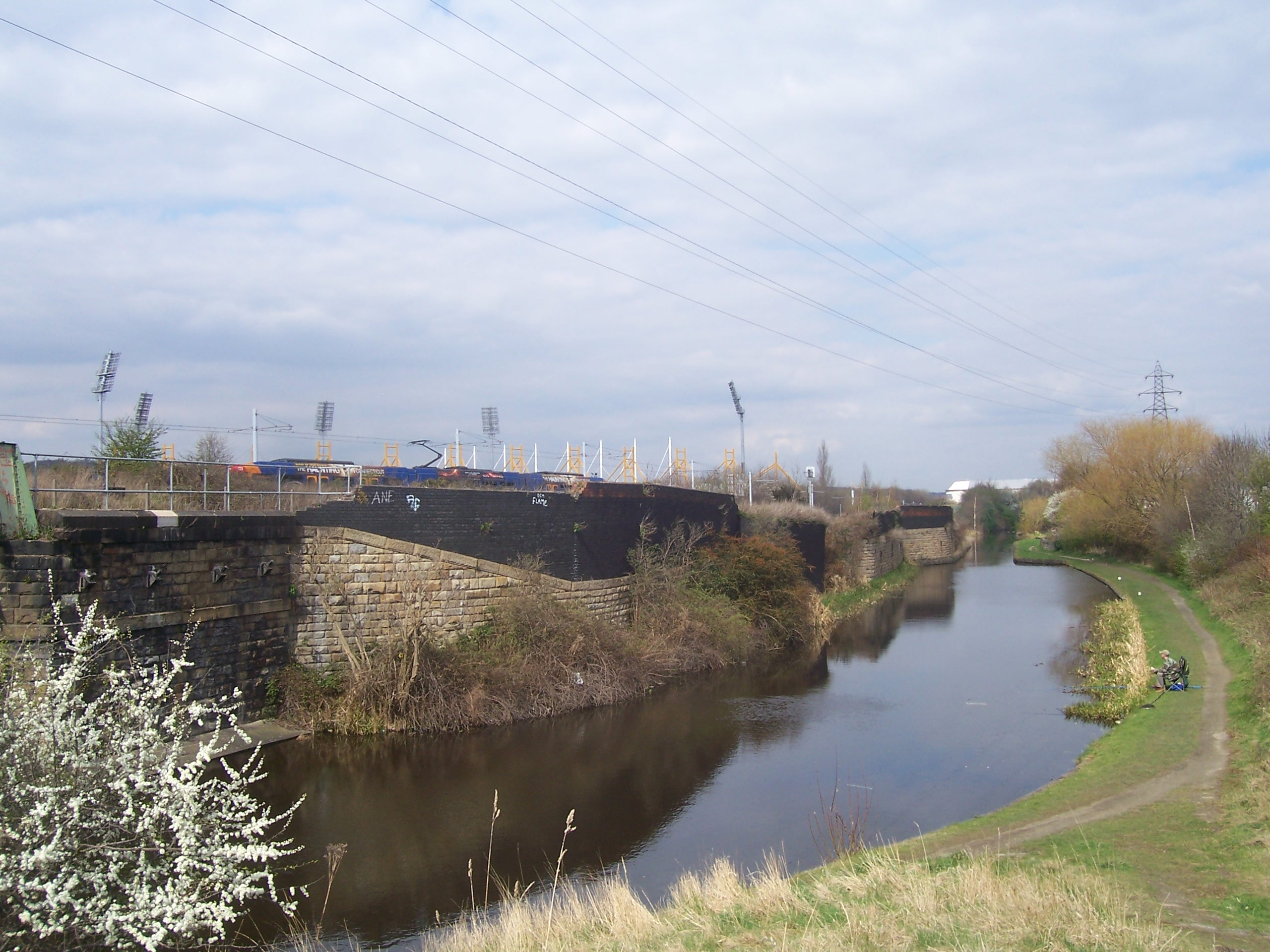
- Attercliffe Station remains in 2009, seen from the Sheffield Canal, with the floodlights of the former Don Valley Stadium in the background.

General information
- Location: Attercliffe, City of Sheffield; England
- Coordinates: 53.393472°N 1.425444°W
- Grid reference: SK383886
- Platforms: 2

Other information
- Status: Disused

History
- Original company: South Yorkshire Railway
- Pre-grouping: Manchester, Sheffield and Lincolnshire Railway, Great Central Railway
- Post-grouping: London and North Eastern Railway

Key dates
- August 1871: Station opened
- 26 September 1927: Station closed
Location

Attercliffe railway station was built to serve the Parish of Attercliffe cum Darnall, then separated from but now part of the City of Sheffield, South Yorkshire, England.

The station was situated on the Manchester, Sheffield and Lincolnshire Railway company's line between Woodburn Junction and Tinsley Junction which was served by trains between Sheffield Victoria, Barnsley and Rotherham Central. Access to the station was by a footpath from Worksop Road. At the station's opening this was the main road between Attercliffe (it left the main Sheffield-Rotherham road opposite the parish church), and Darnall. The station consisted of two platforms flanking the lines and these were linked by a subway.

== History ==
The original station was opened in August 1871, closed on 31 December 1900 and replaced by a new structure which opened the following day. The station was closed on 26 September 1927 but is remembered by the "Station Hotel" on Attercliffe Road, a short distance away which had, and may still have, a fine pictorial sign depicting a station porter at work on the station.

MSLR was renamed the Great Central Railway in 1897. It became part of the London and North Eastern Railway during the Grouping of 1923. Attercliffe Station closed four years later.

Earthworks of the station platforms are still visible as is the subway, now bricked-up, from the towpath of the Sheffield Canal alongside which the railway runs.

Preceding station	Disused railways	Following station
Sheffield Victoria	LNER; Great Central Railway; Sheffield Victoria-Doncaster Line	Broughton Lane
