= Wincobank railway station =

Former railway station in England

Wincobank

General information
- Location: Brightside and Wincobank, City of Sheffield; England
- Coordinates: 53.417580°N 1.412700°W
- Grid reference: SK391913
- Platforms: 2

Other information
- Status: Disused

History
- Original company: Midland Railway
- Pre-grouping: Midland Railway
- Post-grouping: London, Midland and Scottish Railway

Key dates
- 1 May 1868: Station opened
- 1 July 1899: renamed Wincobank and Meadowhall
- 18 June 1951: renamed Wincobank
- 2 April 1956: Station closed
Location

Wincobank railway station, previously named Wincobank and Meadow Hall, was a railway station in Sheffield, South Yorkshire, England. The station served the communities of Brightside and Wincobank and was situated on the Midland Main Line on Meadowhall Road, lying between Holmes and Brightside stations. There were no platforms on the Midland Railway line to Barnsley at the original Wincobank station. This was remedied when Meadowhall Interchange was later built on roughly the same site.

The station was opened on 1 April 1868 and had two platforms although four tracks went through. The two outside tracks were for freight use whilst the two inside tracks were used by both stopping and express trains. Only two were in general use as there were two slow and two fast lines. The station had a subway to access the platforms from Meadowhall Road, and evidence of this can be seen of the bricked up arch in the north-western wall of the bridge abutment.

The station was situated just on the Rotherham side of the junction to the Blackburn Valley line of the South Yorkshire Railway, which itself was just east of the Midland Railway junction which took services from Sheffield to Barnsley. The station closed in 1956 as the immediate area was but sparsely populated and the nearby Brightside station more practical. Meadowhall Interchange station was built on the site and opened in 1990.

Today, the railway lines on the Blackburn Valley line have been removed and a cyclepath has been laid, allowing cyclists and pedestrians to walk between Ecclesfield and Meadowhall, past the similarly named nearby former SYR Meadow Hall and Wincobank railway station. The route is part of the Trans Pennine Trail, a network of coast-to-coast footpaths across the Pennine hills.

The station changed names several times. In 1868 the station opened as Wincobank. It was renamed Wincobank and Meadow Hall station in July 1899 and back to Wincobank station in June 1951. Locals sometimes referred to the station as Cromer Street.

Preceding station	Historical railways	Following station
Brightside; Line open, station closed	Midland Railway	Holmes; Line open, station closed

== See also ==
- Meadowhall Interchange, present station at the same location.
- Meadow Hall and Wincobank railway station, on the South Yorkshire Railway
