= Attercliffe Road railway station =

Disused railway station in South Yorkshire, England

Attercliffe Road

General information
- Location: Attercliffe, City of Sheffield; England
- Coordinates: 53.389140°N 1.450110°W
- Grid reference: SK366881
- Platforms: 2

Other information
- Status: Disused

History
- Pre-grouping: Midland Railway
- Post-grouping: LMSR; London Midland Region of British Railways

Key dates
- 1 February 1870: Opened
- 1995: Closed
Location

Attercliffe Road railway station is a former railway station in Sheffield, South Yorkshire, England.

The station served the communities of Attercliffe, Burngreave and workers in the Don Valley and was situated on the Midland Main Line near Attercliffe Road, lying between Sheffield railway station and Brightside railway station.

== History ==
The station was opened at the same time as the main line from Chesterfield was opened in 1870 and had two platforms. This new station of 1870 was designed by the company architect John Holloway Sanders. The station was positioned above Effingham Street, although access was from a gated path from Leveson Street; an underpass led to an inclined bridge on to the Down platforms.

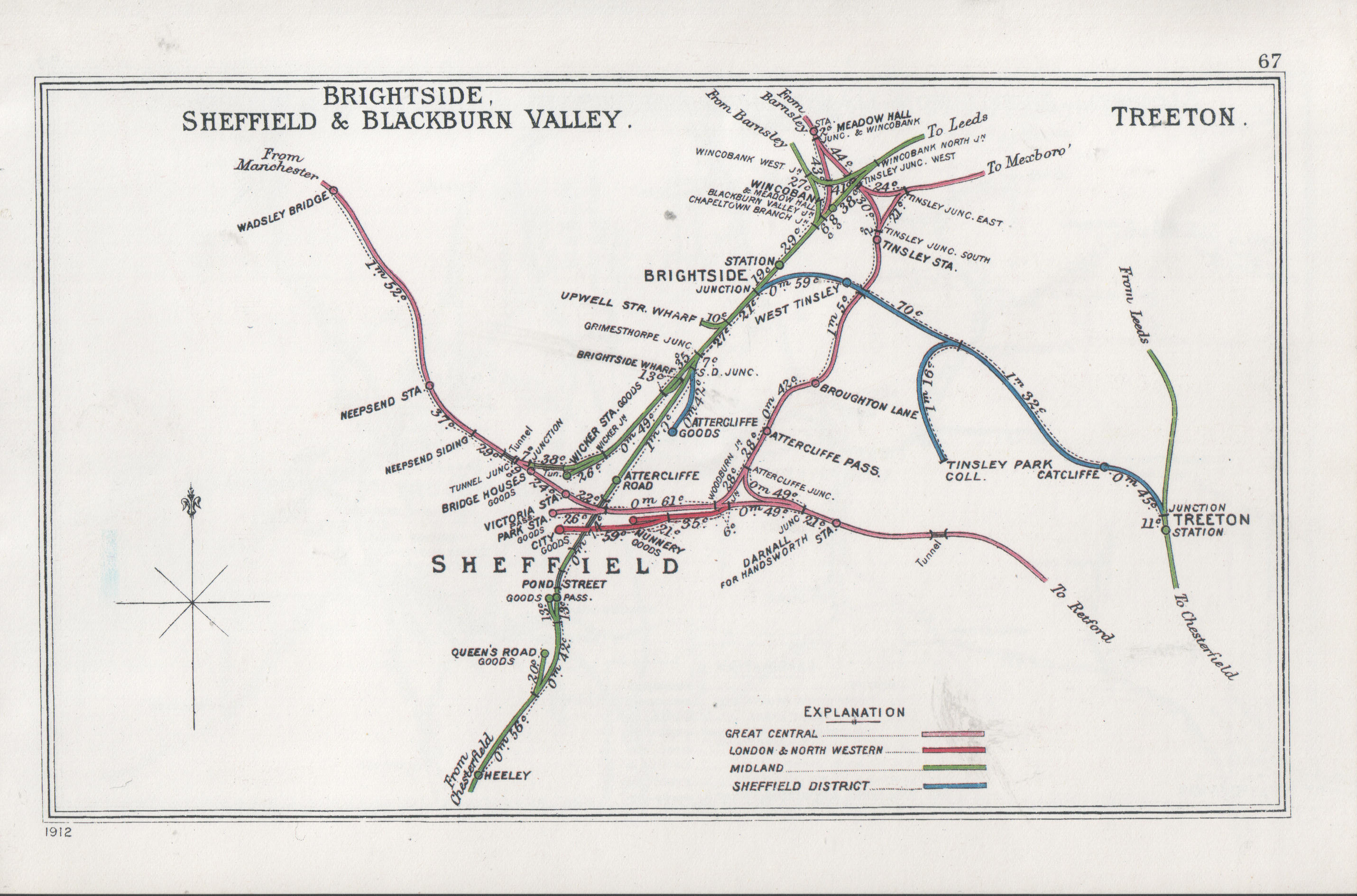
A 1912 Railway Clearing House Junction Diagram showing railways in the vicinity of Attercliffe Road (centre)

Opened by the Midland Railway, it became part of the London Midland and Scottish Railway during the Grouping of 1923. The station then passed on to the London Midland Region of British Railways upon nationalisation in 1948.

When sectorisation was introduced in the 1980s, the station was served by Regional Railways in co-operation with the South Yorkshire Passenger Transport Executive until the privatisation of British Rail.

The decline of Sheffield's steel industry in the later half of the 20th century gradually reduced the passenger usage and made the station less and less needed. By the 1980s only certain morning and evening peak trains called at the station, as stopping trains there exacerbated capacity problems in the major bottleneck north of Sheffield Midland. By the early 1990s this lack of trains had caused the station's patronage to dwindle to a level at which closure was easily justified, again with line capacity constraints being quoted as the reason, with the end coming in 1995. Since 1994 the surrounding area has been served by South Yorkshire Supertram, with Hyde Park stop 500 metres away.

Little is left of the station but the platforms which can be seen from moving trains. The underpass is blocked by overgrown vegetation although the gated entrance can still be seen from Leveson Street just by the bridge over the River Don.

Preceding station	Disused railways	Following station
Sheffield Midland; Line and station open	Midland Railway	Grimesthorpe Bridge; Line open, station closed
Sheffield Midland; Line and station open	Great Central Railway; Sheffield District Railway	West Tinsley; Line and station closed
Sheffield Midland; Line and station open	Regional Railways	Brightside; Line open, station closed
