= Woodhouse Mill railway station =

Former railway station in England

Woodhouse Mill
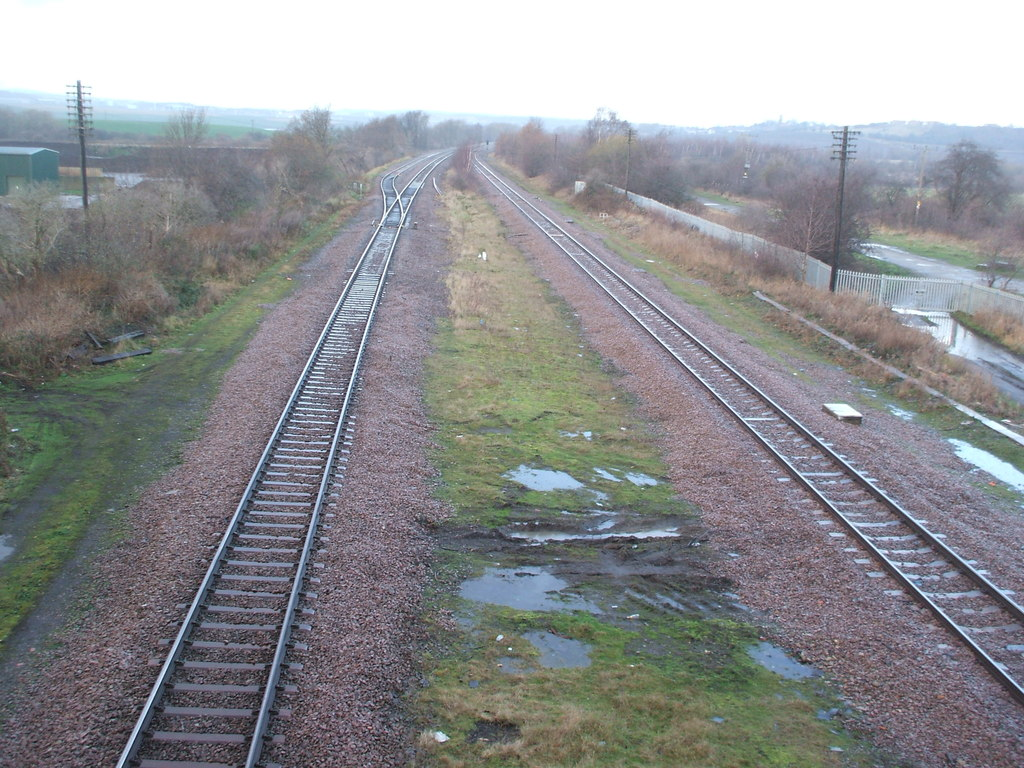
- Site of the former station (2008)

General information
- Location: Aston cum Aughton, Metropolitan Borough of Rotherham; England
- Coordinates: 53.368080°N 1.346370°W
- Grid reference: SK435858
- Platforms: 2

Other information
- Status: Disused

History
- Original company: Midland Railway
- Post-grouping: London, Midland and Scottish Railway

Key dates
- 6 April 1840: Station opened
- 21 September 1953: Station closed for passengers
- 2 November 1964: closed for freight
Location

Woodhouse Mill railway station was opened in 1840 by the North Midland Railway on its line between Rotherham Masborough and Chesterfield.

It was situated to the south of the main A57 road shortly after this left the City of Sheffield and served Woodhouse Mill, near Sheffield, Orgreave, Fence and (Aston cum Aughton), all within Rotherham, South Yorkshire.

It may initially have been simply a halt, but the Midland Railway installed an island platform with a timber and brick booking office at its centre. Nearby was Orgreave Coke Works and Fence Colliery. It closed in 1953.

The station was located between that at Treeton and the original North Midland station at Beighton. The line is still in use today but has been a freight only route since July 1954, although it is very occasionally used as a diversionary route and by excursions not calling at Sheffield. It serves as a bypass line which keeps freight trains away from the congested lines through central Sheffield.

Preceding station	Disused railways	Following station
Treeton; Line and station closed	Midland Railway; North Midland Railway	Beighton; Line and station closed
Treeton; Line and station closed	Great Central Railway; Lancashire, Derbyshire and East Coast Railway	Upperthorpe and Killamarsh; Line and station closed
