= Rotherham Masborough railway station =

Disused railway station in South Yorkshire, England

Rotherham Masborough
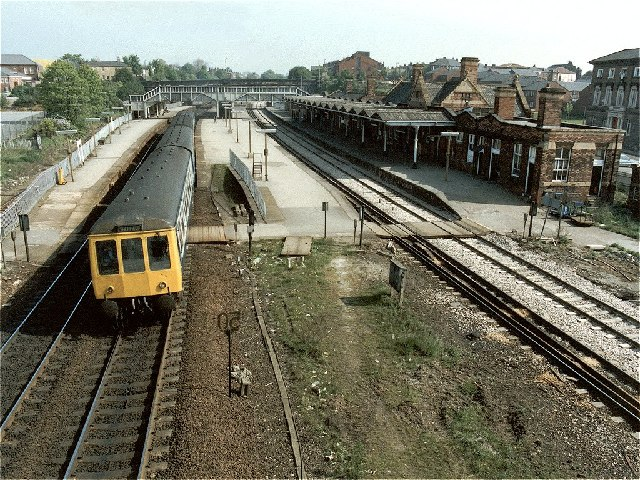
- Rotherham Masborough railway station on the last day of operation

General information
- Location: Rotherham, Metropolitan Borough of Rotherham; England
- Coordinates: 53.430963°N 1.371727°W
- Grid reference: SK418928
- Platforms: 4

Other information
- Status: Disused

History
- Original company: North Midland Railway
- Pre-grouping: Midland Railway
- Post-grouping: LMSR; Eastern Region of British Railways

Key dates
- 11 May 1840: Opened (as Masbrough)
- 1896: Renamed Masbrough & Rotherham
- 1908: Renamed Rotherham Masborough
- 1969: Renamed Rotherham
- 1987: Renamed Rotherham Masborough
- 3 October 1988: Closed
Location

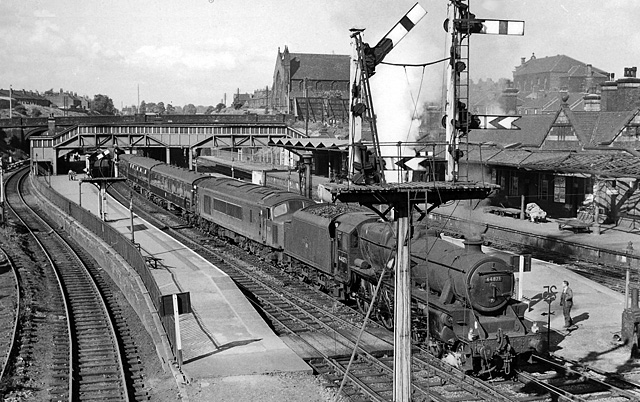
The station in 1963

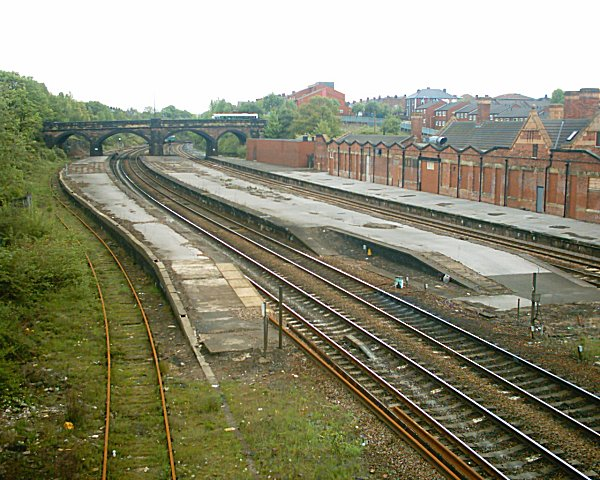
Rotherham Masborough Station in 2004, 16 years after closure.

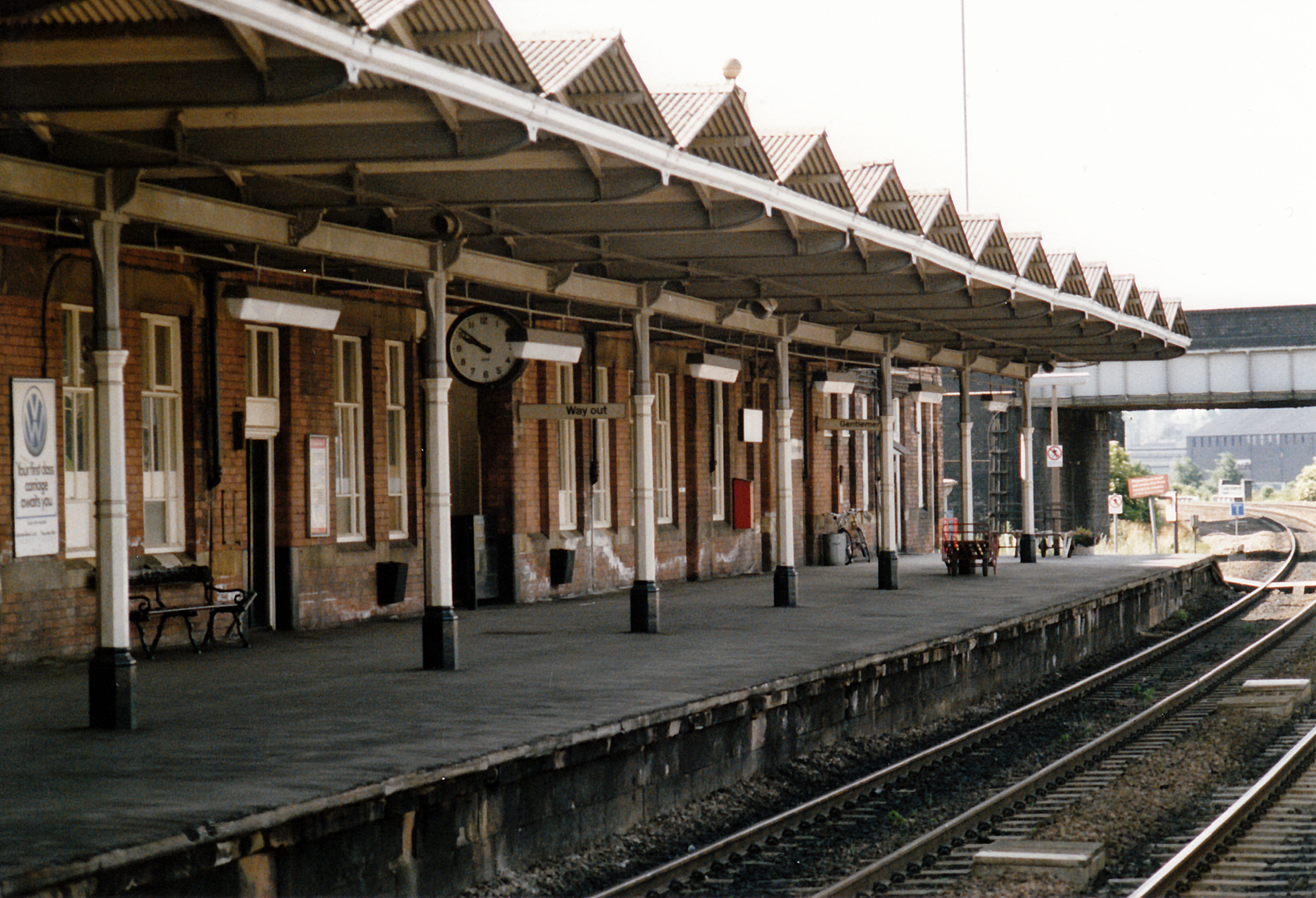
Platform 4 Rotherham Masborough Station in 1986.

Rotherham Masborough railway station was the main railway station for Rotherham, South Yorkshire, England from the 1840s until 1987, when most trains were rerouted via Rotherham Central. It had four platforms, with a large sandstone station building on the eastern Platform Four, large iron and glass platform canopies, a fully enclosed footbridge and wooden waiting rooms on the other platforms. It closed in 1988, except for a few football specials.

== History ==
The original station, designed by Francis Thompson, was opened by the North Midland Railway between Derby and Leeds, and named simply 'Masbrough', without the 'o', since Rotherham had not yet grown to surround the village. The station was renamed 'Masbrough & Rotherham' in 1896, 'Rotherham Masborough' in 1908 (misspelt by the railway company: the name of the district has always been 'Masbrough'), then simply 'Rotherham' in 1969.

The line was the first main link between Yorkshire and London, via Birmingham or Rugby. In time, it became part of the main line to London St Pancras and the South West. Initially, it omitted Sheffield, the region's main settlement, by following a route along the Rother Valley, thus avoiding the difficult terrain on the prospective route south of Sheffield. At Masborough the line passed over the Sheffield & Rotherham Railway's Sheffield Wicker to Rotherham Westgate Station line and a large triangle junction was built allowing trains from the north and North Midland trains to travel into Sheffield from the north-east along the Don Valley. Immediately to the north of this junction stood Rotherham Masborough station.

In the 1870, Sheffield was finally linked with Chesterfield, allowing Midland Main Line trains to call at the newly opened Sheffield railway station on their way north, passing back on to North Midland metals via the Sheffield & Rotherham.

As late as the 1940s some long-distance passenger trains still used the original Chesterfield—Rotherham old road, avoiding Sheffield and calling at Rotherham. Other ex-London expresses would slip a coach at Rotherham until this practice was discontinued nationally from the 1930s onwards. The corresponding up working would involve the coaches being worked to Sheffield by a local train and attached to a London express there. Up until the 1980s the odd London-Leeds express train would call at Masborough.

During the 1960s rationalisation of railways, Rotherham Masborough became Rotherham's only station and eventually lost its 'Masborough' suffix.

Track and signalling rationalisation in the late 1970s meant that platforms 3 and 4 could not be used by Sheffield-bound trains without reversing and removed much operational flexibility on the line as express trains could no longer easily pass/overtake local trains at Rotherham.

In the 1980s at Rotherham a link was built from the former Sheffield & Rotherham Line nearby at Holmes, to the Great Central Railway line, allowing local trains to use a re-opened Rotherham Central station, at the same time reintroducing the flexibility for expresses to pass local trains that had been removed a few years earlier. Rotherham Masborough regained its suffix in the timetables (though not on the station signboards) and soldiered on for a few years with Sheffield-York trains stopping until eventual closure on 3 October 1988. Most of the station buildings, awnings and footbridge were demolished in the early 1990s but the platforms still remain, and the line through the station is still used by express and freight services. The main station building on the east side has been converted into an Indian restaurant.

== Services ==
Preceding station	Historical railways	Following station
Holmes; Line open, station closed	Midland Railway	Parkgate and Rawmarsh; Line open, station closed
Brightside; Line open, station closed	London Midland Region of British Railways	Swinton Town; Line open, station closed
