= Meadow Hall and Wincobank railway station =

Disused railway station in South Yorkshire, England

Meadowhall and Wincobank
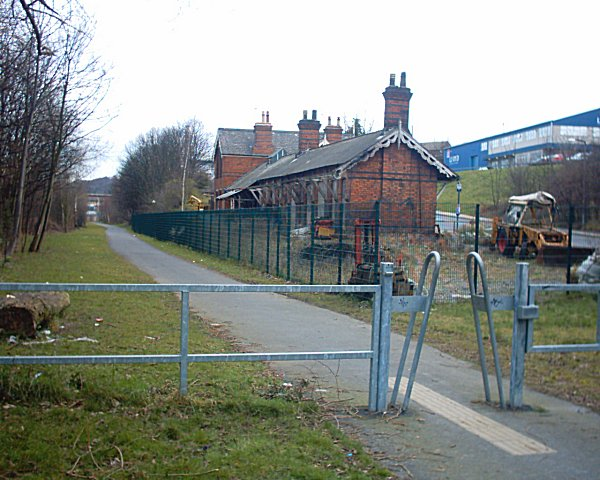

General information
- Location: Wincobank, Sheffield; England
- Coordinates: 53.424720°N 1.416530°W
- Grid reference: SK388921
- Platforms: 2

Other information
- Status: Disused

History
- Original company: South Yorkshire Railway
- Pre-grouping: Great Central Railway
- Post-grouping: LNER

Key dates
- May 1868: Opened (as Meadow Hall)
- 1 July 1899: Renamed Meadow Hall and Wincobank
- 7 December 1953: Closed
Location

Meadowhall and Wincobank railway station—also known in the 19th century as Meadow Hall at the time of the Meadow Hall Iron Works—was a railway station on the South Yorkshire Railway near Sheffield, England.

== History and description ==
The station was on the Barnsley to Sheffield branch of the South Yorkshire Railway, and was the last station on the southern end of the line before the junction with the Midland Railway's Sheffield and Rotherham Railway. It served the communities of Brightside, Wincobank and Blackburn.

This southern connection closed in August 1864 when the line to Woodburn Junction opened, and a passenger service was inaugurated between Sheffield Victoria and Barnsley station.

It was opened as Meadow Hall station in May 1868 and consisted of two platforms flanking the railway. The main station building alongside Blackburn Road remains and is in good condition.

It was renamed as Meadow Hall and Wincobank in July 1899, and kept the name until the station closed to passengers on 7 December 1953.

The line through Meadow Hall closed completely from 31 July 1987 having not seen any traffic since 3 April when Class 20 20150 worked a return trip from Tinsley yard to the Roe Brothers scrap yard. The line from Tinsley South Junction to Meadowhall was subsequently lifted the following year. The line was transformed into a cycle path, which now forms part of the Trans Pennine Trail.
