= Brightside railway station =

Disused railway station in South Yorkshire, England

Brightside
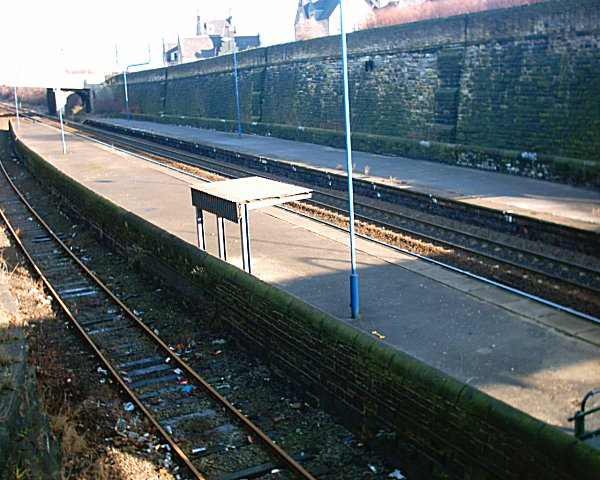
- The remains of Brightside station in 2004. This photo is taken from the access footbridge just off Holywell Road.

General information
- Location: Brightside, City of Sheffield; England
- Coordinates: 53.412220°N 1.421123°W
- Grid reference: SK385907
- Platforms: 2

Other information
- Status: Disused

History
- Original company: Sheffield and Rotherham Railway
- Pre-grouping: Midland Railway
- Post-grouping: LMSR; London Midland Region of British Railways

Key dates
- 1 November 1838: Opened
- 28 January 1995: Closed
Location

Brightside railway station is a former railway station in Sheffield, South Yorkshire, England. The station served the communities of Brightside and Wincobank and was situated on the Midland Main Line on Holywell Road, lying between Attercliffe Road and Holmes railway station.

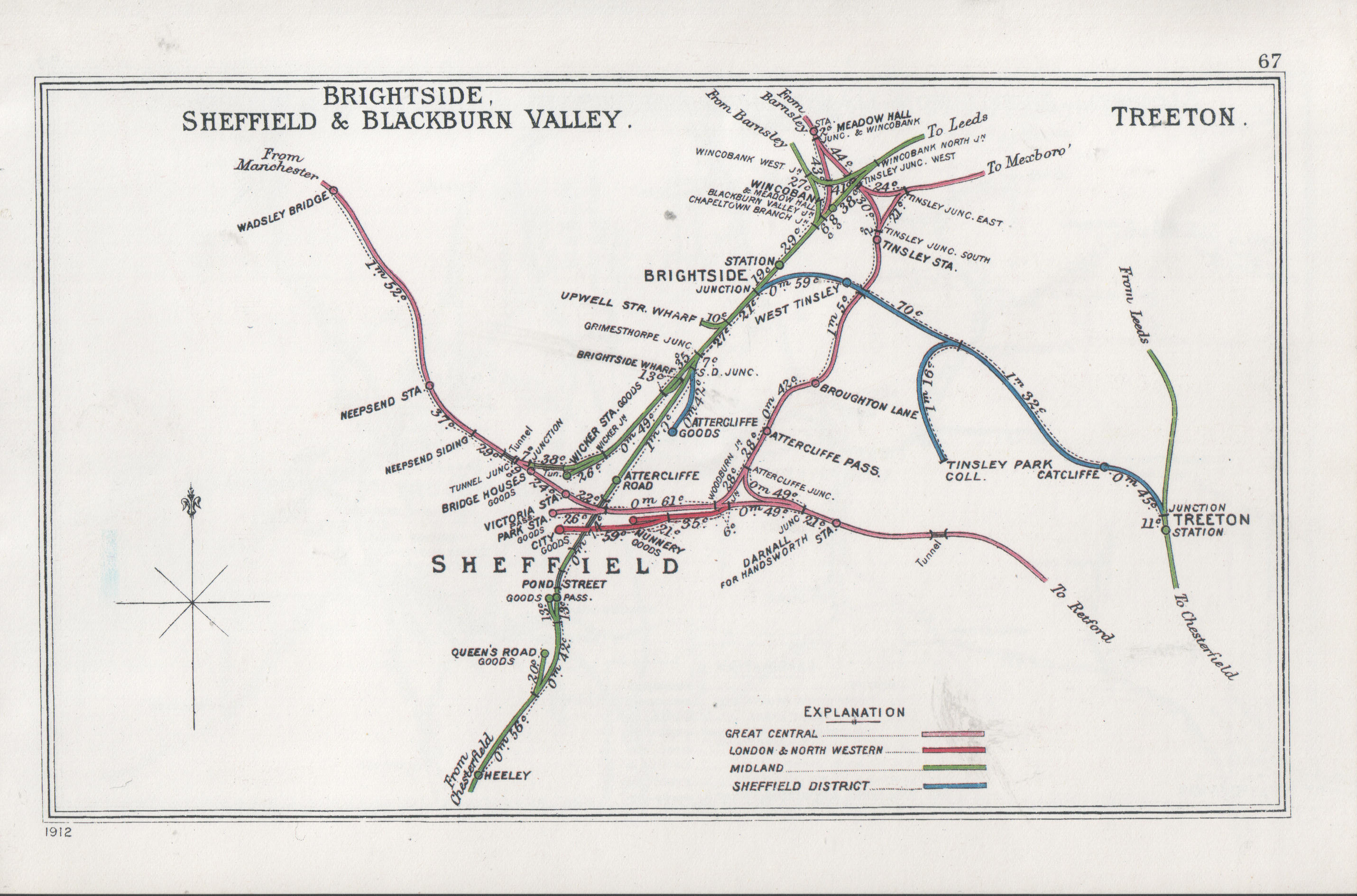
A 1912 Railway Clearing House Junction Diagram showing railways in the vicinity of Brightside (upper centre)

Work on the Sheffield and Rotherham Railway commenced in February 1837, with Brightside Cutting being the first structure undertaken. The station opened on 1 November 1838, at the same time as the Sheffield and Rotherham Railway from Wicker station and had two platforms although four tracks went through. The two outside tracks were for freight use whilst the two inside tracks were used by both stopping and express trains. The station was just over 2 miles (3.2 km) north of Sheffield railway station, and 3 1/2 miles (5.6 km) south of Rotherham. Brightside did not have any goods facilities, however, a goods yard and several sidings were located to the immediate south of the station.

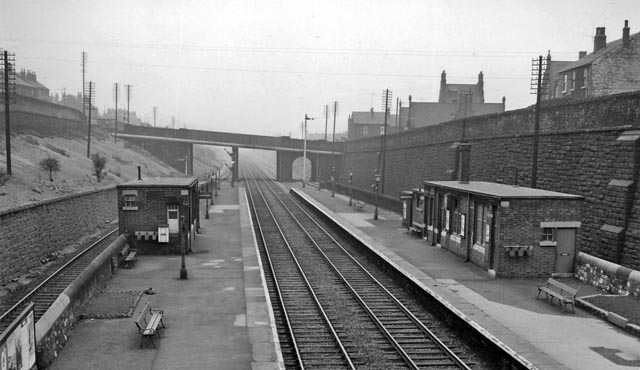
The station in 1961

Despite the opening of Meadowhall Interchange in 1990, the station remained open until 1995. A limited service had continued in its last three years and the station was closed, but all remaining trains could be caught at Meadowhall.

Both platforms remain today albeit stripped of their features and in a bad state of repair; the standard South Yorkshire style bus shelters which had replaced the station buildings by the early 1980s were removed in early 2006. The footbridge remains open a public right of way from Dearne Street to Station Lane, however access to the platforms has been blocked off since the station's closure. Only three lines run through the station site; the line furthest east (the former up slow line towards Sheffield) has been removed.

Preceding station	Historical railways	Following station
Attercliffe Road; Line open, station closed	Midland Railway	Wincobank and Meadowhall; Line open, station closed
Attercliffe Road; Line open, station closed	Regional Railways	Meadowhall Interchange; Line and station open
Grimesthorpe Bridge; Line open, station closed	Sheffield and Rotherham Railway	Wincobank and Meadowhall; Line open, station closed
