= Holmes railway station =

Disused railway station in South Yorkshire, England

Holmes
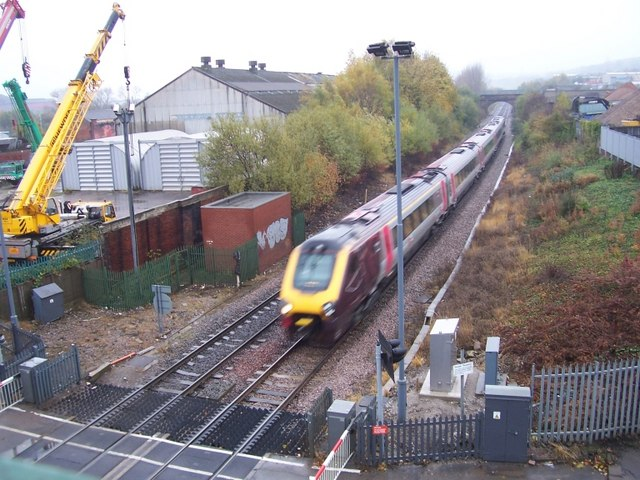
- Train passing the site of the former station (2008)

General information
- Location: Rotherham, Metropolitan Borough of Rotherham; England
- Coordinates: 53.427416°N 1.379290°W
- Grid reference: SK413924
- Platforms: 2

Other information
- Status: Disused

History
- Original company: Sheffield and Rotherham Railway
- Pre-grouping: Midland Railway
- Post-grouping: London, Midland and Scottish Railway; London Midland Region of British Railways

Key dates
- 1 November 1838: Opened as The Holmes
- 1 January 1858: renamed Holmes
- 19 September 1955: Closed
Location

Holmes railway station was a railway station in Rotherham, South Yorkshire, England. The station served the communities of Masbrough and Holmes and was situated on the former Sheffield and Rotherham Railway (S&R) line between Rotherham Westgate Station and Wincobank and Meadowhall Station. The station, which had two flanking platforms, opened with the line.

With the building of the North Midland Railway through Rotherham Masborough, Holmes became the junction of the curve from this station to the Sheffield line. A second curve, allowing trains to travel from the Sheffield line to the North Midland facing south was opened in 1869.

The station was closed in 1955. Nowadays a footbridge spans the two tracks almost above Holmes Junction which, via a British Rail – built chord line, known as "The Holmes Chord", now links the former S&R line to the former Great Central Railway line through Rotherham Central.

The access line to Booth's scrapyard leaves the Holmes Chord shortly after the junction. This line was an original part of the S&R to Rotherham Westgate. Nearby was the factory of Isaac Dodds and Son who supplied the early locomotives for the S&R.

Preceding station	Historical railways	Following station
Wincobank and Meadowhall; Line open, station closed	Midland Railway	Rotherham Masborough; Line open, station closed
