= Sheffield District Railway =

Railway line in South Yorkshire, England

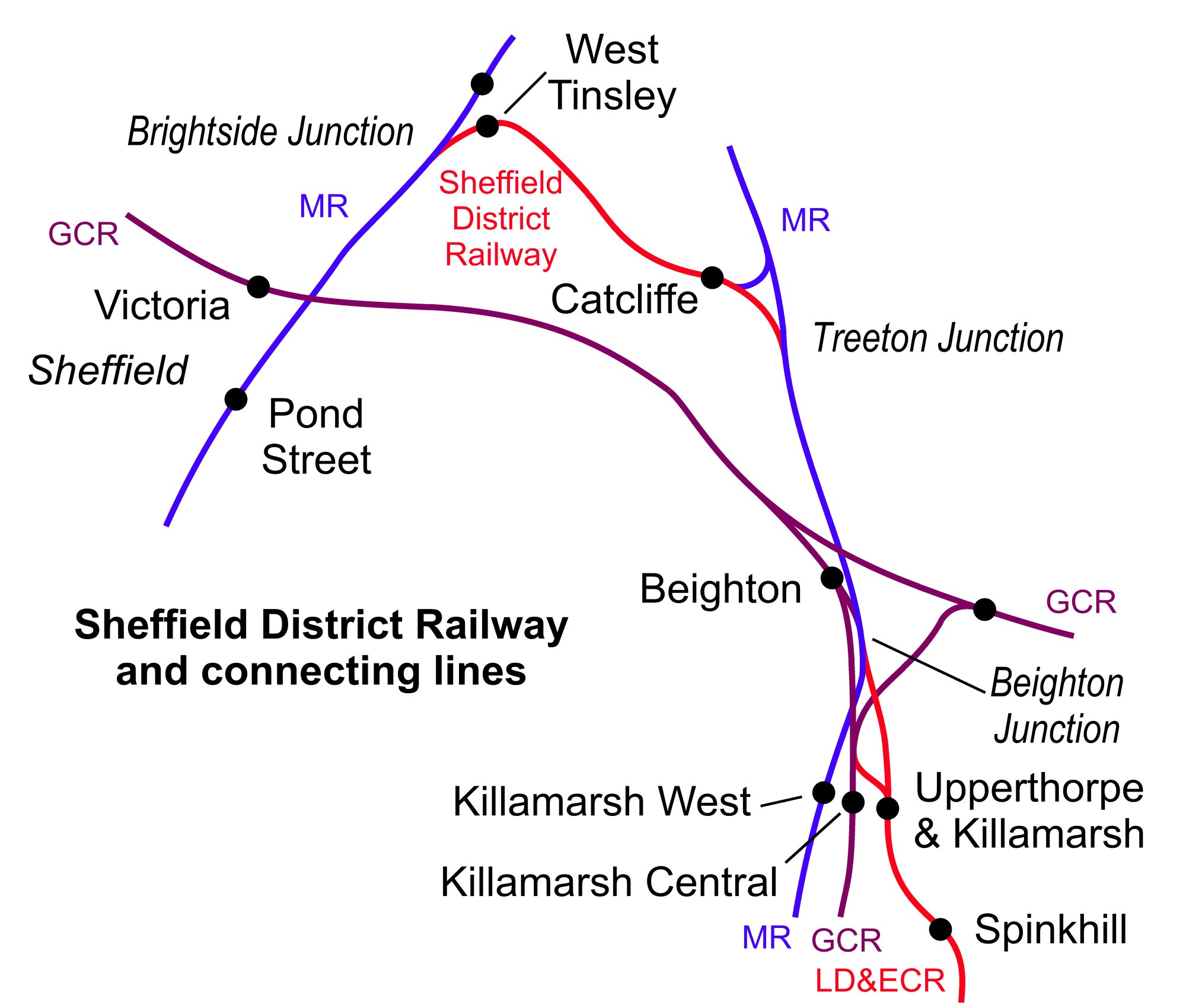
Sheffield District Railway and connecting lines

The Sheffield District Railway was a 3 1/2-mile (6 km) railway line in South Yorkshire, England. It was built to give the Lancashire, Derbyshire and East Coast Railway access to Sheffield, primarily for goods traffic, for which a large goods depot at Attercliffe, in Sheffield, was built. The construction was sponsored by the LD&ECR and the Great Eastern Railway together, with the support of the Midland Railway, which agreed running powers over sections of its own lines. The Sheffield District Railway opened in 1900. The LD&ECR operated the passenger service, although the Midland Railway later ran passenger trains too. The SDR did not have rolling stock and did not operate trains itself. The LD&ECR was absorbed by the Great Central Railway in 1907, and the GCR inherited the LD&ECR running powers.

In the 1960s British Railways sought to rationalise freight operations in the Sheffield area, and needed to build a marshalling yard that had good access to both the former Midland Railway and former Great Central Railway networks in the area, and Tinsley Marshalling Yard on the former Sheffield District Railway was constructed, opening in 1965. This was a large scale scheme, but by this time wagonload freight was in decline on British Railways, and the new yard had a limited life. As of 2020 small-scale activity continues on part of the site, but rail access has been heavily cut back, and only a very small part of the former Sheffield District Railway remains in use.

== Lancashire, Derbyshire and East Coast Railway ==
The Lancashire, Derbyshire and East Coast Railway was conceived as a grand scheme to link coal-bearing areas of Derbyshire and Nottinghamshire with ports on the west and east side of the country. It was a hugely ambitious scheme, and although authorised by Parliament, it failed to attract share subscriptions in any volume. Its board was obliged to cut it back to a line between Chesterfield and Lincoln; instead of carrying coal direct to export ports, it was forced to hand it over to other companies for onward conveyance to the southern counties, or later on, to take it over the Great Central Railway to Immingham for export from there.

In its original parliamentary submission, it had sought access to Sheffield; in fact this was by a branch line to Beighton, and the bill had asked for running powers over the Manchester, Sheffield and Lincolnshire Railway to Sheffield. The MS&LR had opposed this, and the legal powers actually granted by the Lancashire, Derbyshire and East Coast Railway Act 1891 (54 & 55 Vict. c. clxxxix) were for the branch line to Beighton, but not for the running powers. When the branch was constructed, it terminated at Barlborough colliery, near Clowne, as there was no commercial advantage in continuing to Beighton.

Nevertheless, the attraction of reaching the industrial and commercial centre at Sheffield was powerful, and the company continued to consider how the city (Note: Sheffield was granted city status in 1893.) might be reached. There was dissatisfaction among industrialists in Sheffield at the rates charged by the established railway companies there, and consequently there was local support for the LD&ECR's aspiration. The Great Eastern Railway had running powers over the LD&ECR system, and it too encouraged plans to reach Sheffield. In 1894 plans for an independent line to Sheffield were put forward, but at that time the LD&ECR was in particular financial difficulty and the proposal was withdrawn.

== Sheffield District Railway authorised ==
Sheffield District Railway Act 1896
- Act of Parliament
- Parliament of the United Kingdom
- Long title: An Act for incorporating and conferring flowers on the Sheffield District Railway Company and for other purposes.
- Citation: 59 & 60 Vict. c. ccl

Dates
- Royal assent: 14 August 1896

A bill was deposited for the 1896 session of Parliament, this time successfully, and an act of Parliament, the Sheffield District Railway Act 1896 (59 & 60 Vict. c. ccl) of 4 August 1896 authorised the Sheffield District Railway. This was to be a new line running from the LD&ECR at Spinkhill, on the (uncompleted) Beighton branch, to a new terminus at Attercliffe, in Sheffield. The line would running from Killamarsh through Hackenthorpe, Handsworth and Darnall to Attercliffe. The Sheffield District Railway Act 1896 refused several spurs connecting to contiguous railways and requested running powers to the Sheffield MS&LR station. The company had an authorised capital of £400,000. The LD&ECR and the Great Eastern Railway supported the Sheffield District Railway financially and nominated Board members, and both companies would have running powers; the LD&ECR would work the line for 50% of the gross receipts. The Manchester, Sheffield and Lincolnshire Railway retitled itself "The Great Central Railway" from the first day of 1907.

In the following session the Midland Railway promoted a line from Treeton on its North Midland Railway route to Brightside on its Rotherham main line, obtaining the Midland Railway Act 1897 (60 & 61 Vict. c. clxxxiii) on 6 August 1897 (for the Treeton and Brightside Railway).

The Midland and the LD&ECR and the GER now negotiated a compromise combining the two schemes. This was that:

- the Sheffield District Railway should build the Midland's route from the Midland Railway at Brightside to the same company's line at Treeton;
- the Attercliffe station should be built as planned, but connected to the Midland Railway nearby;
- the LD&ECR should build to Beighton as already authorised, but connect to the Midland Railway there (instead of the MS&LR / GCR);
- the Midland Railway would grant running powers over the intervening short sections of its network; and be granted running powers over the new line; and
- the Midland Railway would allow the use of its main passenger station in Sheffield. (Note: Airey's Official Handbook of Stations referred to the station as Pond Street, and some authorities use that name for the Midland Railway's Sheffield station.)

This was an attractive offer: it reduced the extent of new construction from 9 1/2 miles to 3 1/2 miles, reducing the cost of the connection considerably, although making a more roundabout route. The LD&ECR and GER agreed and proceeded with construction.

== Construction ==
Sheffield District Railway Act 1898
- Act of Parliament
- Parliament of the United Kingdom
- Long title: An Act to transfer to and vest in the Sheffield District Railway Company the Treeton and Brightside Railway of the Midland Railway Company to abandon certain authorised railways of the Company to confirm agreements between the Company and other companies and for other purposes.
- Citation: 61 & 62 Vict. c. ccxxiv

Dates
- Royal assent: 12 August 1898

Text of statute as originally enacted

Construction was quickly started: the first sod was turned at Sheffield on 20 November 1896 by the Duke of Norfolk; the variation on the authorised route was passed by the Sheffield District Railway Act 1898 (61 & 62 Vict. c. ccxxiv) of 12 August 1898.

A junction with the MS&LR at Beighton was no longer needed, and a junction would be made with the Midland Railway instead, immediately south of the Midland connection to the MS&LR at Beighton, so keeping later options open. (Note: Sources refer to the connecting point as "at Killamarsh", and it is certainly south of the originally intended "Beighton" location. However the junction was named "Beighton Junction", and "Killamarsh Junction" (direct to the GCR) was later made further south. See Cupit and Taylor page 23.)

Although nominally an independent concern, the Sheffield District Railway was a creature of the LD&ECR and the GER together; and it was not proposed to acquire rolling stock. While the SDR built from Treeton to Brightside, and also the Attercliffe terminal and the short branch serving it, the LD&ECR needed to complete the authorised section of the Beighton branch from Barlborough.

== Attercliffe depot ==
The Attercliffe depot was well equipped, and involved a considerable extent of groundworks. (Note: Cupit and Taylor use a section heading "Attercliffe Road" on page 122. However all the text in their book, and also a photograph of a name sign at the depot (page 124), as well as the name used in other sources, simply refers to "Attercliffe". There was an Attercliffe Road passenger station on the Midland Railway nearby.)

T. Booth, writing in 1899, said

The goods yard at Attercliffe will be provided with good warehouse accommodation and crane power for dealing with heavy iron work, &c. Ample arrangements will also be made for dealing with cattle, &c. The cost of the undertaking will be very great. Extensive excavations have had to be made, and a great number of bridges erected. The site on which the Goods Station stands has been greatly altered from its original surroundings. The course of the river Don has been diverted twice, and the sides of the stream walled. It has also been necessary to raise the ground by at least twelve feet, and considering that the station covers an immense tract of land, this has been no slight undertaking. The diversion of the river involved the removal of 40,000 cubic yards of material, and the new walls to the river Don represent 2,500 cubic yards of masonry and 1,200 cubic yards of brickwork. 4,500 cubic feet of pitch pine has been used for piles under the walls, the abutments and piers.

Construction of the 40-acre site involved two diversions of the River Don, and filling to raise the ground level by 125 feet.

The 1886 authorisation for the Sheffield District Railway had included passenger use at the Attercliffe terminal. This was not now necessary, but it was not to be relinquished prematurely:

"As the Attercliffe depot may occasionally be used for passengers, a platform is being built for their convenience."

== Opening and early operation ==
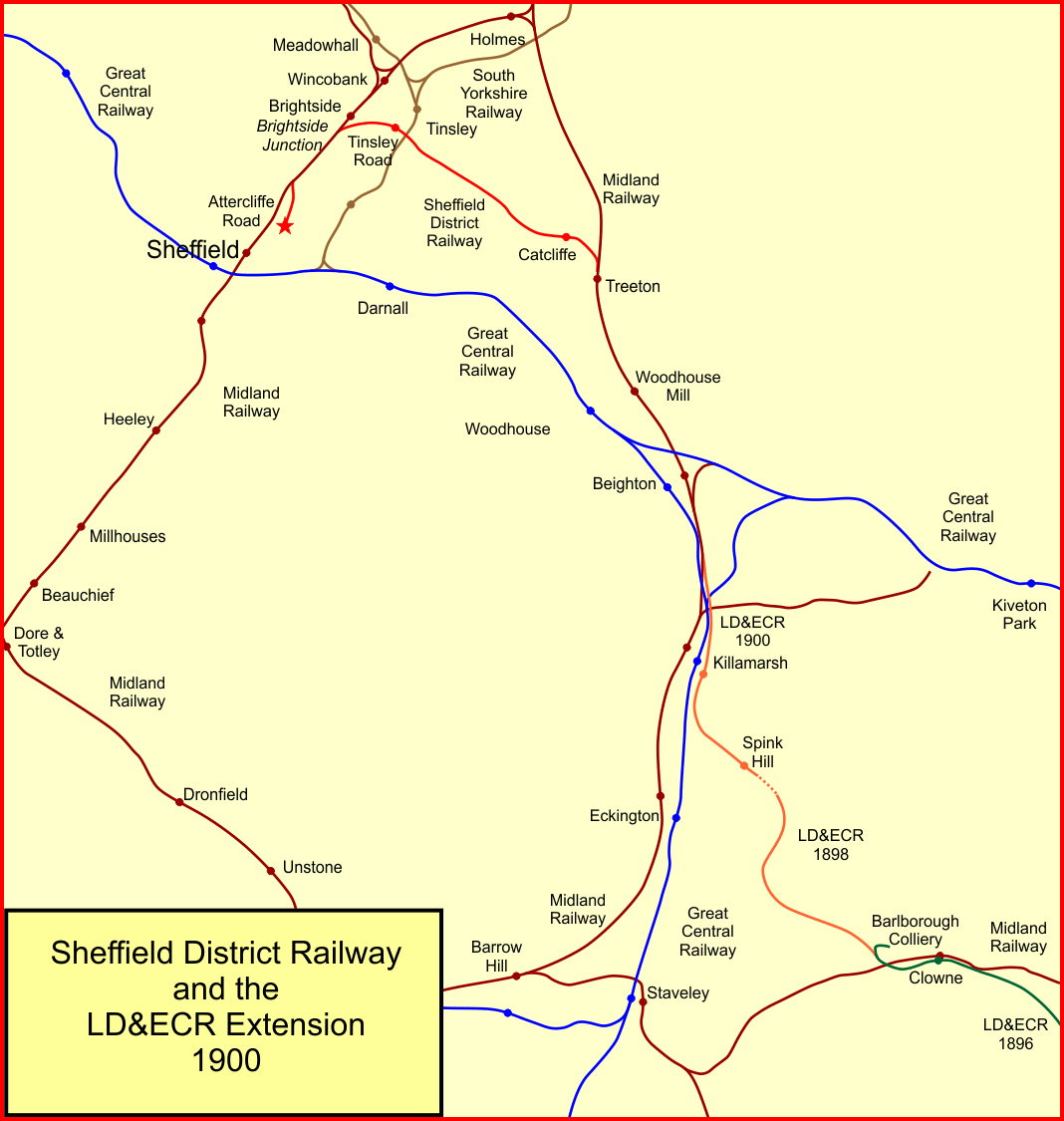
The Sheffield District Railway in 1900

On 21 May 1900 the Duke of Portland conducted a ceremony opening the Sheffield District Railway, as well as the extension of the LD&ECR from Barlborough to the junction with the Midland Railway at Beighton Junction. The actual opening to goods and mineral traffic was on 28 May, and to passengers on 30 May 1900. The new routes were double track. The Attercliffe branch left the Midland Railway's Leeds line at Sheffield District junction, 7 chains south of Grimesthorpe junction, and continued for 50 chains to the new goods depot and warehouse. The depot covered 40 acres, and was well situated in relation to adjacent industrial facilities.

The course of the SDR lay through rather desolate territory; there were two intermediate passenger stations, at Tinsley Road (three-quarters of a mile from Brightside junction) and Catcliffe (not far from Treeton junction). There were 18 bridges and viaducts and an 80-yard tunnel, named Tinsley Wood. Near Tinsley Road station a massive steel girder bridge crossing the Great Central Sheffield—Barnsley line; at Brightside there was a viaduct consisting of six spans each of 30 feet, a lattice girder of 100 feet across the River Don and a plate girder of 80 feet over Meadow Hall Road.

The Sheffield District Railway added a number of goods and industrial links: to West Tinsley goods yard in 1900, and in 1903 to Tinsley Park colliery and several short connections.

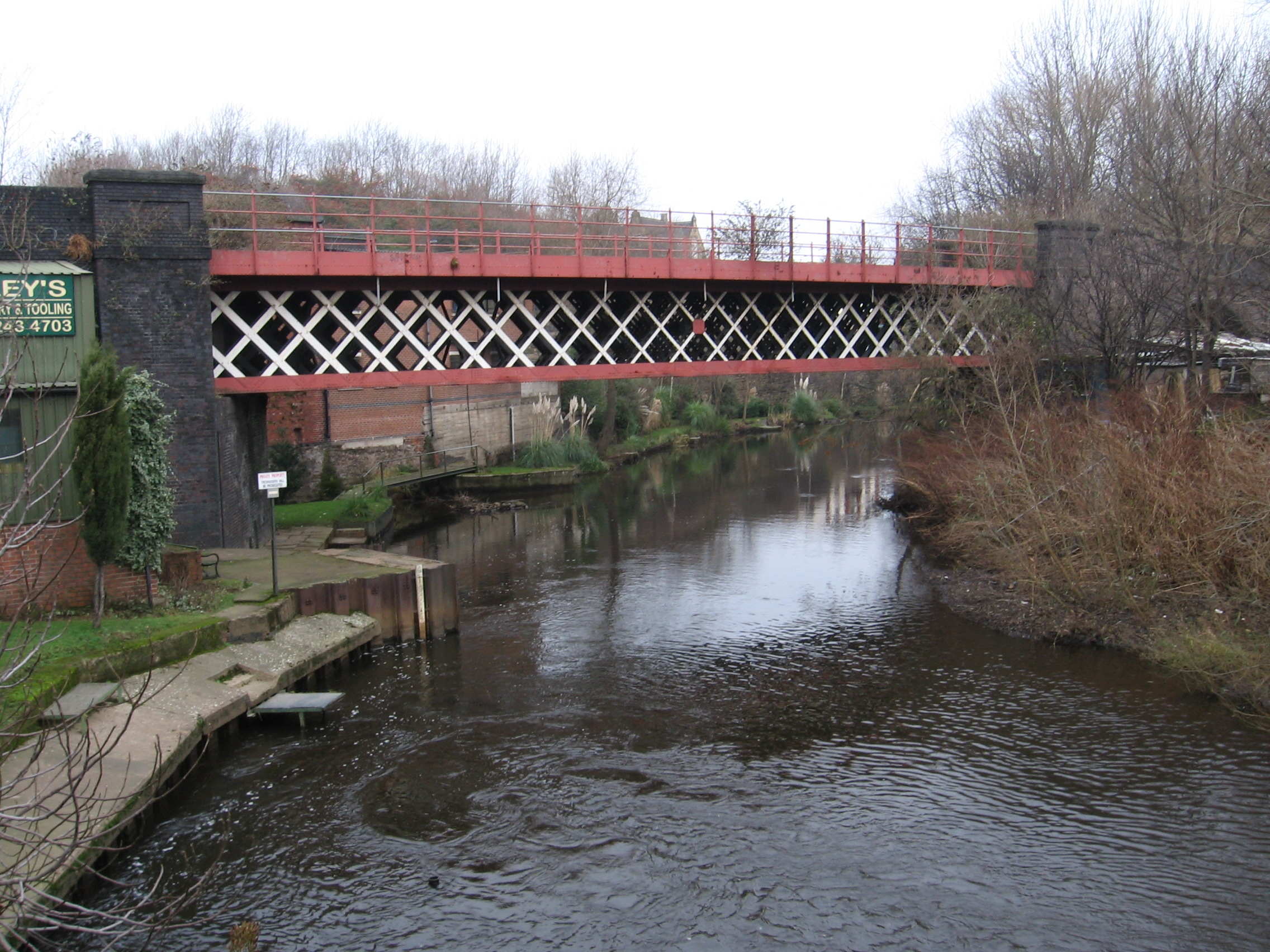
Viaduct over the Don

The Sheffield District Railway did not operate its own train services. The LD&ECR ran six trains daily between Langwith Junction and Sheffield (Midland station). The last train of the day arrived at Sheffield Midland at 8.27 p.m., and worked back empty to Attercliffe yard, and was attached to an LD&ECR goods train which left later for Langwith Junction.

Most goods workings over the SDR were operated by the LD&ECR: the GER made very little use of its running powers. By contrast the Midland Railway made increasing use of the line; from 1 July 1903 it ran a service of four trains each way between Sheffield and Mansfield, hauled by its own locomotives but with LD&ECR rolling stock.

== Ownership change and transfer of running powers ==
The Sheffield District Railway was an independent company, but effectively under the control of the Lancashire, Derbyshire and East Coast Railway and the Great Eastern Railway together, by virtue of the right to appoint directors. The LD&ECR was absorbed by the Great Central Railway on 1 January 1907, and the running powers it had over the SDR were transferred with the ownership. In consequence the Great Northern Railway obtained running powers over the District line for goods and mineral traffic to and from Sheffield. As part of the trading of running powers, there was a condition that the Great Central Railway would not use the Midland Railway station at Sheffield in competition with Midland's own train service.

== Grouping of the railways, and later ==
In 1921 the government passed the Railways Act 1921, which restructured most of the main line railways of Great Britain into one or other of four new large railway companies, in a process referred to as the "grouping", generally effective from 1 January 1923. The Great Central Railway was a constituent of the new London and North Eastern Railway (LNER), and the Sheffield District Railway was absorbed by the LNER. The Midland Railway, by now a significant user of the SDR, was a constituent of the new London, Midland and Scottish Railway, LMS. The LMS inherited the running powers of its predecessor.

In 1948 the railways were nationalised, and the line was under the control of British Railways.

== Passenger service withdrawal ==
Passenger services along the SDR's main line ran between Sheffield and Mansfield via the LD&ECR's Beighton Branch, and also between Sheffield and Chesterfield.

The passenger service was not commercially successful, and was withdrawn on 11 September 1939. It reopened on 6 October 1946, but the two stations on the SDR itself remained closed, and the resumed passenger service closed finally, on 17 March 1947.

== Tinsley yard ==
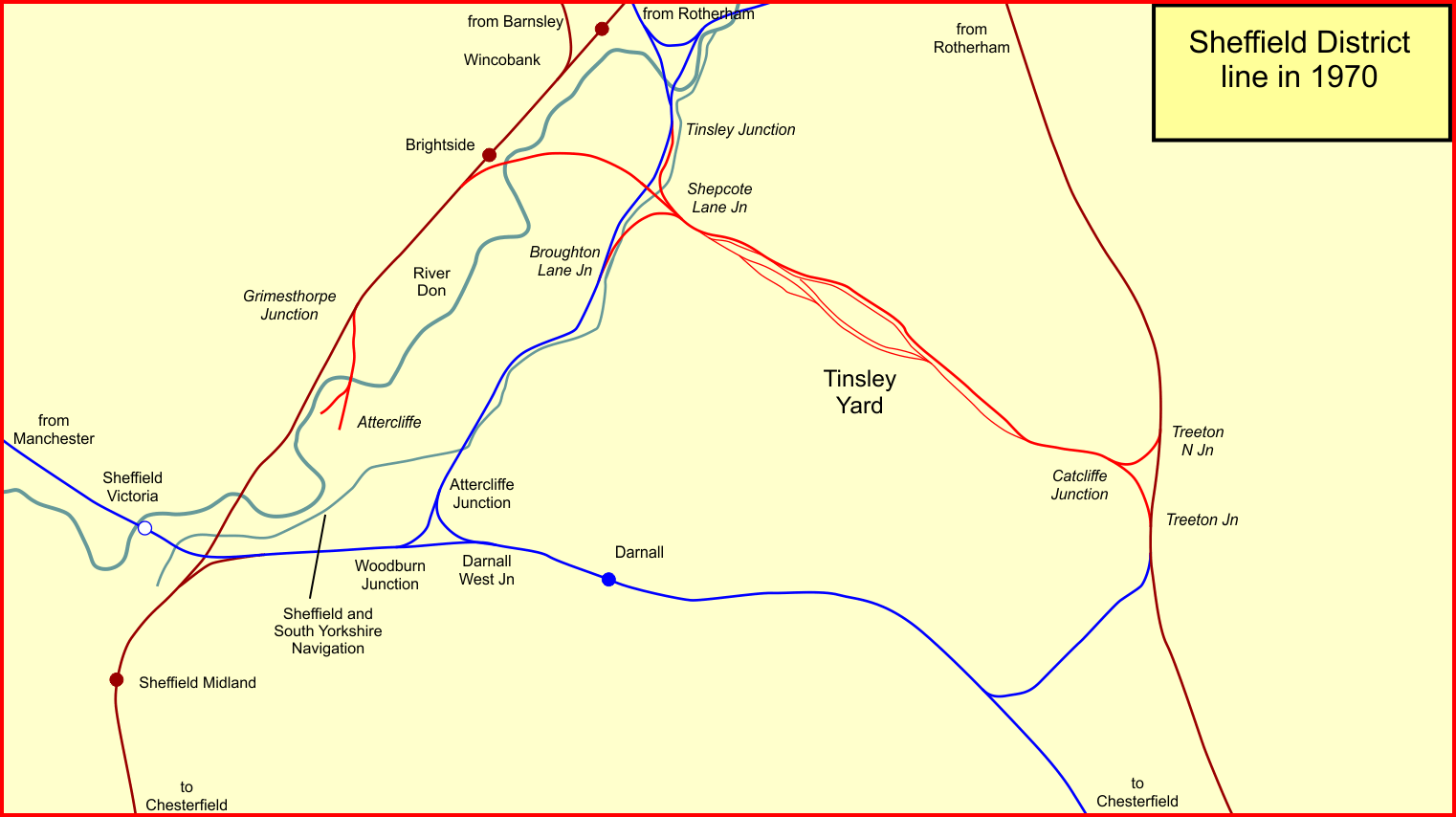
The Sheffield District Railway in 1970 after the commissioning of Tinsley yard

Gerard Fiennes, General Manager of the Eastern Region of British Railways, described the search for a location to rationalise freight movement in the Sheffield area. A major problem was the lack of connections between the former Midland and former Great Central networks. Fiennes, Dick Temple, the Divisional Manager at Sheffield and Ralph Sadler, the Chief Civil Engineer spent

two days looking at the places where Midland and Great Central were close with the idea of a common marshalling yard... Eventually we landed up at Catcliffe with the Midland line at our back and before us, the Sheffield District Line leading to Brightside and junctions with the Midland and with the Great Central there. "From here," I said, "with a couple of new junctions we can get north, south, east and west. We can make the Midland and the G.C. one railway. But look at that bloody great mountain in the middle of the site". Ralph rolled his head and his one eye; he waved his hands; "Muck shifting is easy nowadays. I can take it away in a matter of months". We decided there and then.

In 1961 a scheme was initiated to modernise the handling of freight around Sheffield. A major part was to provide a large marshalling yard at Tinsley, on the former Sheffield District Railway. Although the topography was unfavourable, the availability of land and the potential connections to other routes made the location an obvious choice. Legal powers were obtained in an act of Parliament in 1960 and earth moving was started in August 1961. A new west to north curve was constructed on to the North Midland route at Treeton and the existing west to south connection was realigned. At the west end two new spurs were built connecting the former South Yorkshire Railway Sheffield - Rotherham line. A new connection was made at Aldwarke, where the former Midland and South Yorkshire lines ran close together. The marshalling yard had 78 sorting sidings and 25 was designed to handle 275 freight trains every 24 hours. Computer control of retarders was installed. Access to the yard from Woodburn and Darnall junctions was electrified, at the 1,500 v d.c. system then in use on the former Great Central route. The yard was formally opened on 29 October 1965.

At the time Tinsley yard was commissioned, it was already beginning to become clear that wagonload freight on British Railways had an uncertain future. A series of reviews, in many cases prompted by demands for heavy investment in wagons and infrastructure, indicated a bleak future and weak support.

This was emphasised by the reduction in the number of freight vehicles on the system, from 862,640 in 1962 to 137,589 in 1979, when most of the latter were in trainload use.

In 1977 the Speedlink service was introduced; this included fast-running air-braked freight services; although some remarshalling was involved, the transits were primarily point-to-point, requiring no traditional sorting whatever. The Speedlink system was itself withdrawn in 1991.

Tinsley yard was consequently run down; through traffic on the Sheffield District Line had dwindled to nothing, and the access to it was heavily reduced at the western end in 1992, and was severed at the eastern end in 1993.

The line is now only used sporadically between Tinsley South Junction and Tinsley Yard.
