= Burngreave (ward) =

Electoral ward in the City of Sheffield, South Yorkshire, England

Coordinates: 53.391°N 1.458°W

- Shown within Sheffield
- Area: 2.8 sq mi (7.3 km^{2})
- Population: 27,481 (2011)
  - Density: 9,815/sq mi (3,790/km^{2})
- Metropolitan borough: City of Sheffield
- Metropolitan county: South Yorkshire
- Region: Yorkshire and the Humber
- Country: England
- Sovereign state: United Kingdom
- Post town: SHEFFIELD
- Postcode district: S4
- Dialling code: 0114
- UK Parliament: Sheffield Brightside and Hillsborough
- Councillors: Jacqueline Drayton (Labour Party); Mark Jones (Labour Party); Talib Hussain (Labour Party)

Burngreave ward—which includes the districts of Burngreave, Fir Vale, Grimesthorpe, Pitsmoor, and Shirecliffe—is one of the 28 electoral wards in Sheffield, England. It is located in the northern part of the city and covers an area of 2.8 square miles (7.3 km^{2}; 1,800 acres). The population of this ward in 2011 was 27,481 people in 9,906 households. It is one of the wards that make up the Sheffield Brightside and Hillsborough constituency. Most of the ward is served by a free community newspaper, the Burngreave Messenger.

== Districts ==
=== Burngreave ===
Burngreave (grid reference SK363884) is a suburb of Sheffield that started to develop in the second half of the nineteenth century.

=== Fir Vale ===
Fir Vale (grid reference SK364903) is a suburb of Sheffield. It lies north west of Firshill, and the area in between was historically known as Pitsmoor Firs. On 12 June 2020 66 confirmed deaths caused by the coronavirus were reported in the Crabtree and Fir Vale district in the three months up to May 2020. The Office for National Statistics said this was the highest number of coronavirus deaths of any area of England and Wales. This is nearly twice the number of deaths per 100,000 population of the next highest area, Church End in the London Borough of Brent. A care home, where staff said they were told not to wear face masks is under investigation by the Health and Safety Executive.

Crabtree Ponds is a Wildlife Trust for Sheffield and Rotherham nature reserve at Fir Vale. It was originally an ornamental pond for Crabtree Lodge, built in the nineteenth century. Fish such as rudd, roach, perch, crucian carp, sticklebacks and eels can be found at the site. Amphibians at the reserve are smooth and palmate newt, frogs and toads. Pipistrelle, Daubenton's and Leisler's bats have been seen feeding at the ponds. The surrounding woodland is dominated by sycamore, poplar and ash. Blue tits, great tits, treecreepers, woodpeckers, and wrens also breed at the nature reserve.

=== Grimesthorpe ===
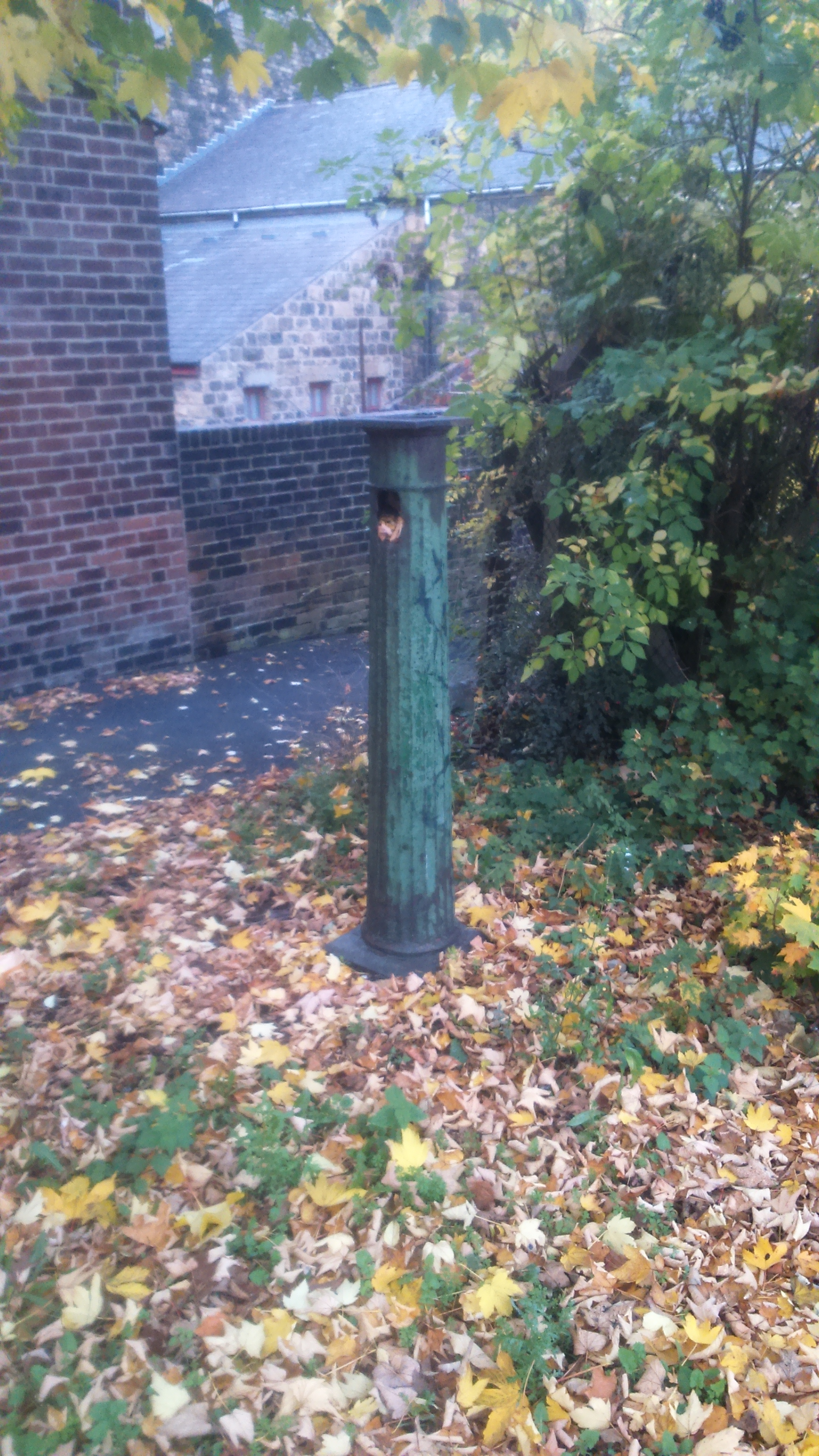
Grimesthorpe Pump

Grimesthorpe grid reference SK371901 is a suburb in north east Sheffield, lying west of Brightside and north east of Pitsmoor.

The settlement originated in the Dark Ages as a farmstead, passing from Grimshaw to Ulfae, the De Buslis, the De Lovetots and then the Dukes of Norfolk. A guide of 1840 describes the appearance of the village as "exceedingly striking, and partakes in some degree of the grotesque", with it main feature being the Grimesthorpe Grinding Wheel Company. The hills around the village had already been extensively quarried.

Grimesthorpe lies below Wincobank Hill, and in the nineteenth century was surrounded by woods, which were popular places for walking. Between 1838 and January 1843 the area was served by Grimesthorpe Bridge railway station on the Sheffield and Rotherham Railway. The area became somewhat run down in the twentieth century. A nineteenth century village pump survives in the suburb.

=== Osgathorpe ===
Osgathorpe is a small suburb of Sheffield, lying between Shirecliffe and Firvale. It was probably founded by Norse settlers, and was for many years a hamlet largely owned by the Wake family, who were based in the now-demolished Osgathorpe Cottage. The area was largely covered by housing in the nineteenth century. Osgathorpe Park, classified by Sheffield City Council as a "local park", lies in the area.

=== Pitsmoor ===
Pitsmoor (grid reference SK362893) is a former village, now a suburb of Sheffield.

=== Shirecliffe ===
Shirecliffe (grid reference SK355905) is a suburb of Sheffield, lying west of Grimesthorpe. Its name comes from "scir-cliffe", a bright, steep hillside. In the mediaeval period, the area was owned by the De Mounteney family, who had a seat at Shirecliffe Hall, demolished in the early nineteenth century. In 1676, the hall was home to a congregationalist church founded by the curates of James Fisher, who had been ejected as Vicar of Sheffield.

== Demographics ==
This district of Sheffield is home to a large percentage of Sheffield's ethnic minority population as these statistics from the 2001 census show:

- White: 58.5%
- (White British: 55.8%)
- Black British: 12.3%
- (Black Caribbean: 6.3%)
- (Black African: 5.2%)
- British Asian: 22.9%
- (Indian: 0.8%)
- (Pakistani: 18.8%)
- (Bangladeshi: 0.6%)
- British Chinese & other: 1.6%
- (Chinese: 0.2%)
- Multiracial: 4.7%

According to the 2011 census:

- White: 42.5%
- (White British: 38.1%)
- Black British: 14.0%
- (Black African: 7.9%)
- (Black Caribbean: 3.6%)
- Asian British: 28.3%
- (Indian: 1.7%)
- (Pakistani: 22.8%)
- (Bangladeshi: 0.6%)
- (Chinese: 0.5%)
- Mixed: 4.7%
- Other: 10.4%
- (Arab: 7.8%)

The most common countries of birth, other than the UK, were Pakistan-2,507 (9.1%), Somalia-880 (3.2%) and Jamaica-411 (1.5%)

== Burngreave Messenger ==
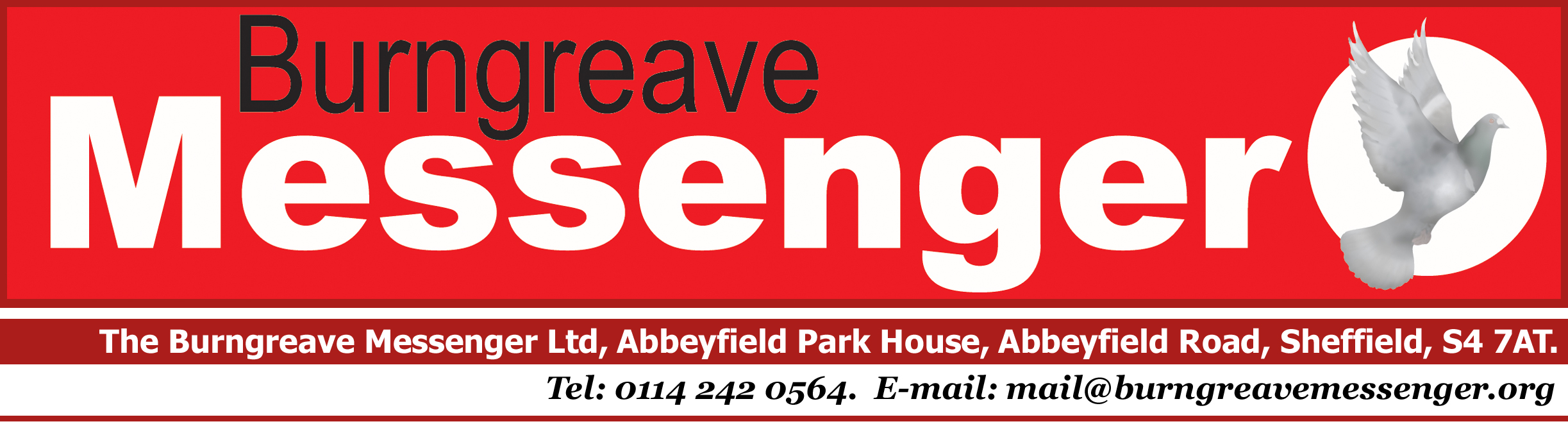

The Burngreave Messenger is a community newspaper based in Burngreave.

It is published eight times a year and is distributed free to all households and businesses in the area. Its print run is 9,400.

The Messenger has no single editor, but is edited by a team of paid staff and volunteers from the community. The first edition was published in July 1999, and it celebrated its fiftieth issue in April 2005. The cover of that issue is pictured (right).

The Messenger is funded by a combination of paid-for adverts, grant funding, and a small amount of donations and sponsorship. Its main funders have been Burngreave New Deal for Communities (a ten-year regeneration programme funded by the government) and the Tudor Trust Charitable Trust, as well as from the Community Media Association, Yorkshire Forward and the National Lottery.
