= Dyson House =

Building in Sheffield, England

Coordinates: 53°22′38.4″N 1°27′51.9″W

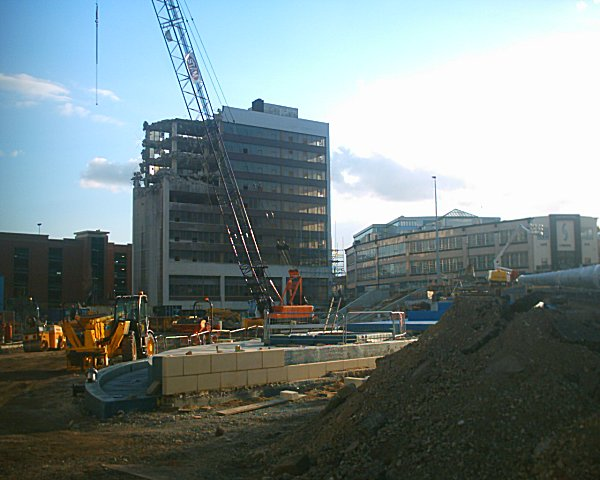
Dyson House from Sheffield Station.

Dyson House was a building which was part of Sheffield Hallam University's city campus in Sheffield, South Yorkshire, England. The building was on Sheaf Square, next to the Sheffield Midland Station. Dyson House became unused by the university for several years, and was bought by Yorkshire Forward as part of the Heart of the city scheme funded by EU regeneration money and was demolished in 2006. The site along with the adjacent Sheaf House has a proposal for a new 200,000 sq ft (19,000 m^{2}) office block, shops and 200 apartments in a mixed use scheme of a futuristic modern design by Make Architects (Ken Shuttleworth) designers of the acclaimed Swiss Re (Gerkin) building in London.

== See also ==
- Heart of the City – City centre regeneration scheme
