= Grimesthorpe Bridge railway station =

Disused railway station in South Yorkshire, England

Grimesthorpe Bridge

General information
- Location: Grimesthorpe, City of Sheffield; England
- Coordinates: 53.4061°N 1.4303°W
- Grid reference: SK379900

Other information
- Status: Disused

History
- Original company: Sheffield and Rotherham Railway

Key dates
- October 1838: Opened
- January 1843: Closed
Location

Grimesthorpe Bridge railway station was a minor railway station in Sheffield, South Yorkshire, England. The station served the communities of Grimesthorpe and was situated on the Sheffield and Rotherham Railway, lying between Wicker and Brightside.

Grimesthorpe Bridge was the first intermediate station to open on the Sheffield and Rotherham Railway, in October 1838. The line was not yet part of the Midland Railway. The station disappeared from the timetables in January 1843, four and a half years after the line's opening.

The station location is now underneath what is known as Grimesthorpe Junction and its complex trackplan. There, the lines from Wicker, Sheffield Midland, Attercliffe Goods station, the Sheffield District Railway and from Rotherham/Barnsley met.

Preceding station	Historical railways	Following station
Attercliffe Road; Line open, station closed	Sheffield and Rotherham Railway	Brightside; Line open, station closed
