= Sheaf House =

Building in Sheffield, England

Coordinates: 53°22′39.6″N 1°27′49.6″W

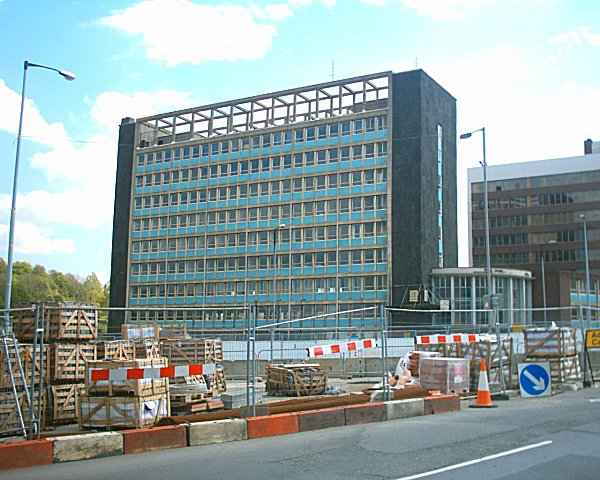
Sheaf House during Sheaf Square's rebuilding

Sheaf House was a nine-storey tower building by Sheaf Square, next to Sheffield railway station, in the centre of Sheffield, in South Yorkshire, England. The building was formerly the Sheffield area headquarters of British Rail.

== History ==
The building was situated on the former Pond Street Goods station, closed on 7 October 1961. Land was cleared during 1963 to make way for the new offices. Sheaf House was built with a reinforced concrete frame, finished with modern (at the time) metal and glass cladding. The building was opened in 1965 and housed 500 staff who had been transferred from the Midland Railway old offices in Norfolk House. Line control offices at Rotherham Westgate and Victoria were also closed and transferred to Sheaf House, becoming British Rail's Sheffield Division headquarters.

The building was demolished in late 2005 to make way for the redevelopment of Sheaf Square. This action featured on Channel 4's Demolition television programme.

== Proposed schemes ==
There had previously been several proposals for refurbishing the building, including transforming it into a 180 bedroom hotel. The latest proposal along with the adjacent Dyson House site is for a futuristic mixed use scheme designed by Make Architects (Ken Shuttleworth) designer of the Swiss Re (Gerkin) in London. The scheme is partial funded by EU regeneration grants and Yorkshire Forward as part of the Heart of the City projects masterplan to regenerate the area. The site forms part of the E-campus development currently underway on the site of the former Sheaf Baths site opposite the station and adjacent to the Pond Street bus station.
