= Sheaf Square =

Open space in Sheffield, England

Coordinates: 53°22′41″N 1°27′53″W

Sheaf Square is a municipal square lying immediately east of the city centre of Sheffield, England.

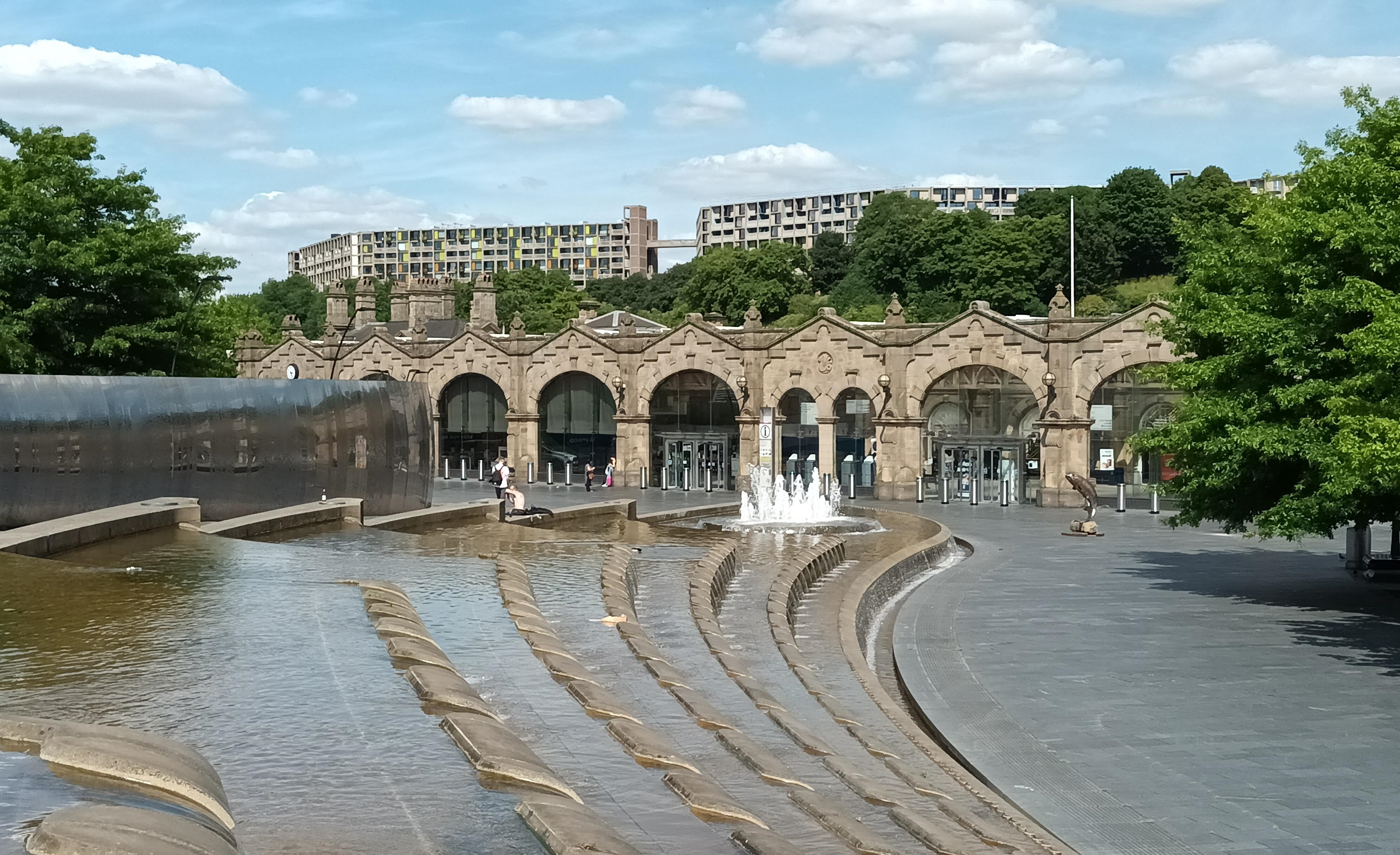
Sheaf Square with the railway station and Park Hill in the background.

Sheaf Square with pedestrian accesses to the railway station

The sides of the square are lined with major buildings: Sheffield railway station, the Showroom Cinema, Sheffield Science Park, the early nineteenth century Howard Hotel, in addition to the site of the old Nelson Mandela Building, the former Sheffield Hallam University Students' Union, demolished to make way for a proposed mixed-use development, by CTP St. James, incorporating office and hotel space. Sheaf House and Dyson House, demolished in 2005 and 2006 respectively, completed the square, which now has its southern edge much further back, lined by the station's car-park. Plans include further development of the Sheffield Digital Campus, and an addition to the Transport Interchange on the site of Sheaf House.

The square lies near the confluence of the Porter Brook and River Sheaf. Pond Tilt Forge and its dam were constructed on the site in 1732, with Bamforth Dam following about 1780. The two were filled in 1856 to accommodate the proposed railway station. The square was built as part of the Corporation's post-World War II traffic plan for Sheffield. The site became a major intersection on Sheffield's new inner ring road with Sheaf Street, Pond Street, Howard Street and Paternoster Row meeting at a roundabout which was named Sheaf Square after the now subterranean river.

Work began in 2006 to simplify the road system and create a primarily pedestrianised space with a water cascade and a steel sculpture, leading people from the station, up Howard Street and into the city centre to the side of the Square.

The gateway to Sheffield city centre situated to the side of Sheaf Square opened on 22 December 2006 with street performances and a fireworks display. The gateway contains seating, trees, effective lighting and two large water features, one of which includes The Cutting Edge steel sculpture. The new construction now acts as a 21st-century gateway to the city and aims to give a good first impression of Sheffield to those arriving by train.

The maps below show the difference in the road layout of Sheaf Square before and after the remodelling:

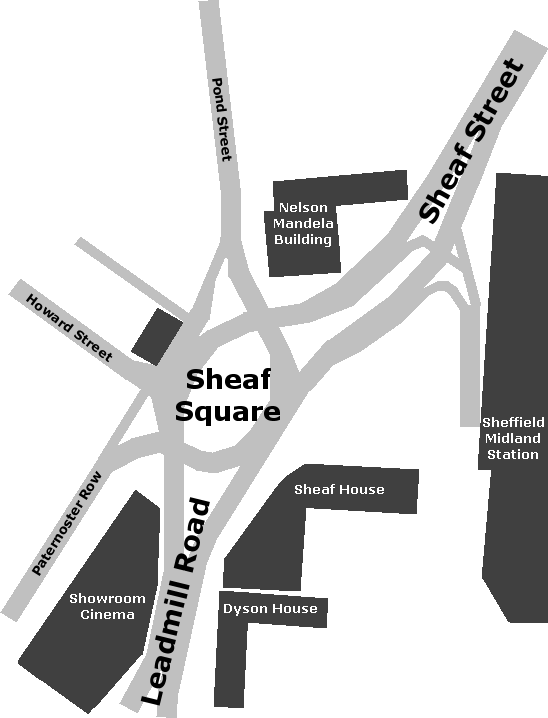
Sheaf Square in 2002

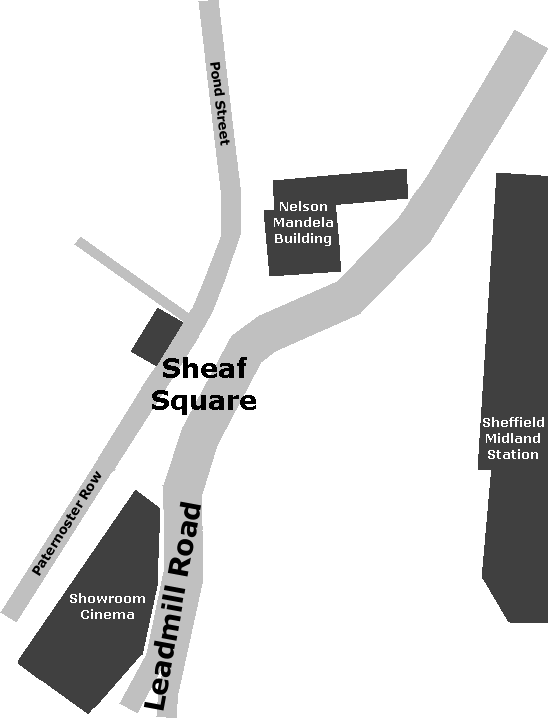
Sheaf Square in 2006

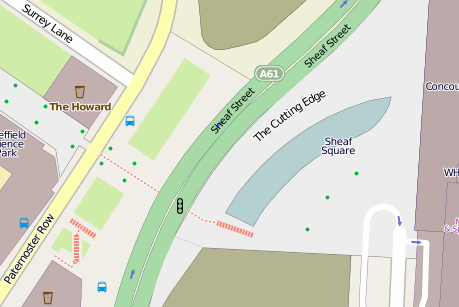
OSM rendition of Sheaf Square 2012

== See also ==
- Heart of the City - City centre regeneration scheme
