= Rotherham Westgate railway station =

Former railway station in England

Rotherham Westgate
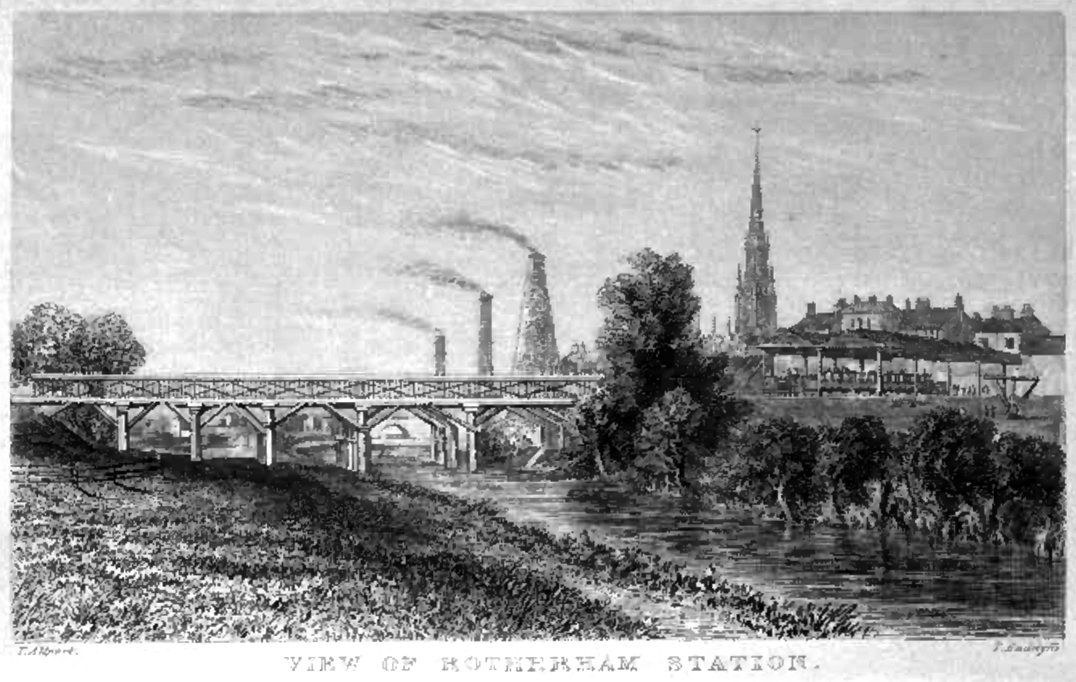
- Westgate Station c1840

General information
- Location: Rotherham, Rotherham; England
- Coordinates: 53.429220°N 1.358450°W
- Grid reference: SK427926
- Platforms: 1

Other information
- Status: Disused

History
- Original company: Sheffield and Rotherham Railway
- Pre-grouping: Midland Railway
- Post-grouping: LMSR; London Midland Region of British Railways

Key dates
- 31 October 1838: Opened
- 4 October 1952: Closed to passengers
- 1970: Demolished
Location

Rotherham Westgate railway station was the eastern terminus of the five-mile-long Sheffield and Rotherham Railway, the first passenger-carrying railway in the Sheffield/Rotherham area. In central Rotherham on the eastern bank of the River Don, it was a single-platform terminus that opened on 31 October 1838 and closed on 4 October 1952.

== History ==
The original station building was a substantial stone affair on Westgate, from where passengers had to cross the tracks on a level pedestrian crossing to access the platform. At the end of the 19th century, this situation was remedied by giving the station access to Main Street and building a temporary wooden station building there with direct access to the platform. This became known by the townsfolk as the "Rabbit Hutch" and was subject of some local complaint as not being fit for a town as important as Rotherham. The old station building became the GPO and a labour exchange, and finally passed back into railway hands as a line control office.

The river was crossed by a 300-foot (91 m) wooden bridge with seven spans over which the station platform extended, and then the line passed over the River Don Navigation on a three-arched bridge, the centre arch of which was 36 feet (11 m) long and made of iron. This section of canal was owned by the South Yorkshire Railway Company, which became part of the Manchester, Sheffield and Lincolnshire Railway in 1864, and in order for its line from Mexborough to Sheffield to pass under the Westgate line, the canal below Ickles lock was diverted to join the river, and part of the Eastwood Cut below Rotherham lock was diverted to the east in the same year. The original canal bed was then filled in, and the tracks were laid along its course. It was in this section that, in 1871, the Manchester, Sheffield and Lincolnshire Railway built Rotherham Central. The line ran immediately south of Millmoor, the former ground of Rotherham United, leading to its southern stand being named the 'Railway End'.

Following the opening of the North Midland Railway between Leeds and Derby, the new through Masbrough station, later Rotherham Masborough, was opened about 1/2 mile (0.8 km) from the town centre. A junction was laid connecting this north–south line to the Sheffield and Rotherham Railway at Holmes, giving the North Midland access to the Wicker terminal of the S&R in Sheffield. The S&R eventually became part of the Midland Railway following amalgamations in 1844. The fact that the Midland also operated the much larger Masborough station could have relegated Westgate to being a backwater, but Westgate was much more central, and the standard service pattern on the Midland line after 1870, was for some Sheffield–Nottingham, Sheffield–Derby and Sheffield–Manchester local trains to start back from Westgate and run through Sheffield Midland, calling at all stations; this kept Westgate a busy and important station right up to its closure.

== Closure ==
By the middle of the twentieth century, trains to Westgate still passed over the 1830s vintage wooden bridge to call at the supposedly temporary wooden station buildings. It was the need to replace the by now decrepit bridge that prompted BR to close the station on 4 October 1952. At the end of its life, passengers were not allowed on to the portion of platform on the bridge and trains were not allowed to stand on the bridge. Freight continued for a few years until the bridge was in no fit state to carry any trains and was demolished. The station lay derelict for nearly two decades, with the wooden buildings being used to store dismantled market stalls (the site of the town's market was opposite the station at the time), until 1970 when the site was cleared and new Post Office sorting centre built. In the late 1960s the remaining part of the railway alignment was severed by a new road, but west of this the branch still remains serving C F Booth's scrapyard, albeit now at ground level rather than on an embankment.
