= Sheffield Wicker railway station =

Disused railway station in South Yorkshire, England

Wicker

General information
- Location: Wicker, South Yorkshire, City of Sheffield; England
- Coordinates: 53.389720°N 1.458340°W
- Grid reference: SK361882

Other information
- Status: Disused

History
- Original company: Sheffield and Rotherham Railway
- Pre-grouping: Midland Railway
- Post-grouping: London, Midland and Scottish Railway; London Midland Region of British Railways

Key dates
- 31 October 1838: Opened
- 1 February 1870: Closed to passengers, renamed Wicker Goods
- 12 July 1965: Closed for freight
Location

Wicker railway station (later Wicker Goods railway station) was the first railway station to be built in Sheffield, England. It was to the north of the city centre, at the northern end of the Wicker, in the fork formed by Spital Hill and Savile Street. It was opened on 31 October 1838 as the southern terminus of the Sheffield and Rotherham Railway, which ran north to Rotherham Westgate railway station.

In 1840, the line was connected to the North Midland Railway at Rotherham Masborough railway station. Carriages from Sheffield would be attached to North Midland trains for onward travel. A southbound curve was added in 1869.

On 1 January 1847, a half-mile connecting line from the Wicker to the Bridgehouses station of the Manchester, Sheffield and Lincolnshire Railway had been constructed in order to increase goods traffic and enable wagon transfers. This short steeply graded line, enclosed within a tunnel for almost its entire length, was known locally as the Fiery Jack.

Wicker was replaced as a passenger station by Sheffield Midland Station on 1 February 1870 when the Midland Railway opened a new direct route from Chesterfield to just north of Wicker, now part of the Midland Main Line. Railway workers refer to this route as the "New Road", as opposed to the "Old Road" of the original North Midland line. It has gradients of 1 in 100, a viaduct and three tunnels, including Bradway Tunnel, 2,027 yards (1,853 m) long.

Wicker remained open as a goods station until 1965 and has now been demolished. The site is currently occupied by a Tesco Extra supermarket, having previously contained car dealerships and was, until 2006 when the Spital Hill / Savile Street corner was remodelled as part of the Sheffield Northern Relief Road, the home of Amanda King's Made In Sheffield sculpture, now removed.

Preceding station	Historical railways	Following station
Terminus; Line and station closed	Sheffield and Rotherham Railway	Grimesthorpe Bridge; Line open, station closed

== See also ==
- Sheffield Midland station
- Sheffield Victoria railway station

== Bibliography ==
- Fox, Peter, (1990) The Midland Line in Sheffield, Sheffield: Platform 5 Publishing Ltd. ISBN 1-872524-16-8
- Pixton, B., (2000) North Midland: Portrait of a Famous Route, Cheltenham: Runpast Publishing
