= Sheffield station =

Principal railway station and tram stop in South Yorkshire, England

Sheffield
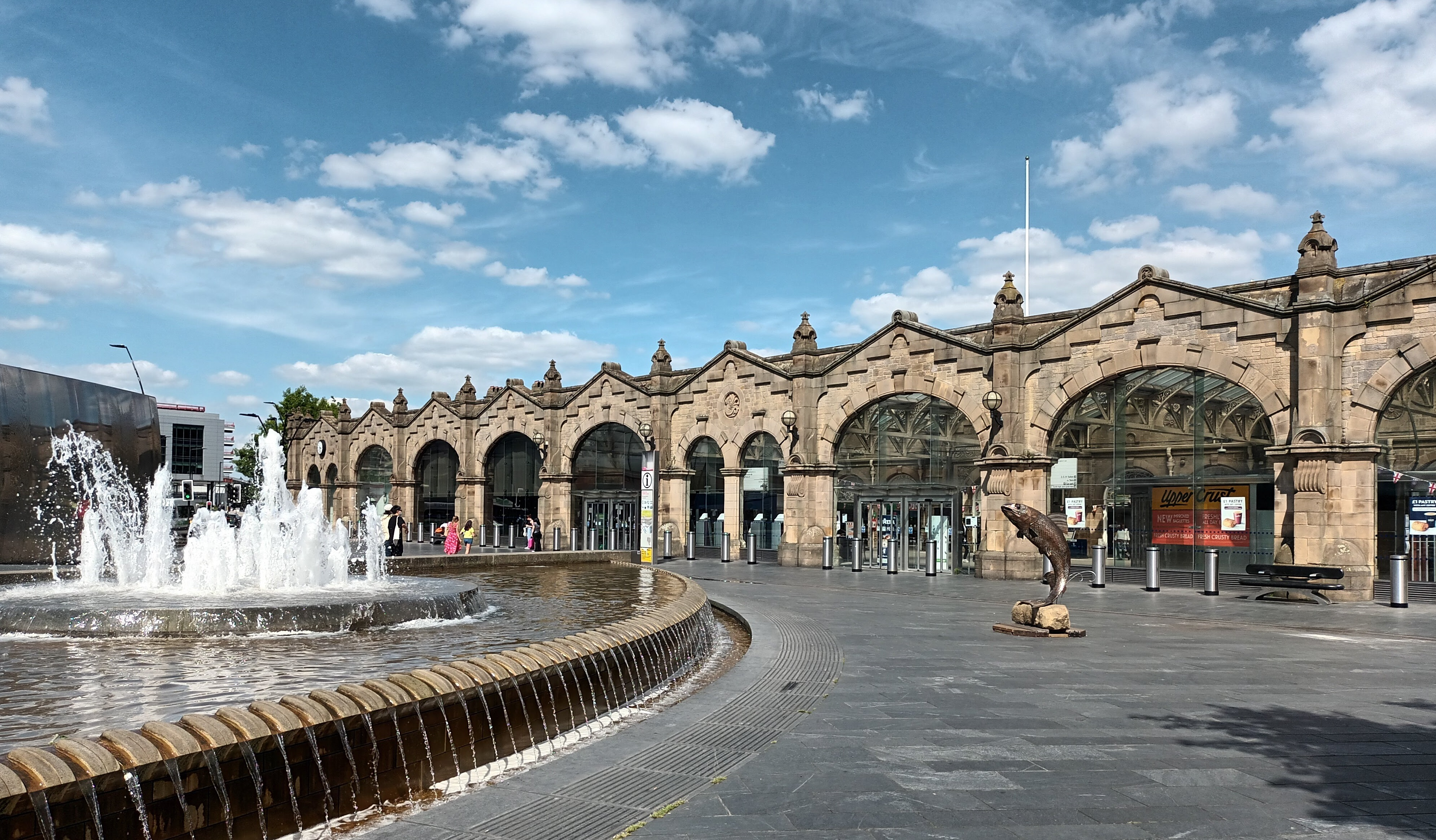
- The station frontage, from Sheaf Square

General information
- Location: Sheffield, City of Sheffield, England
- Coordinates: 53.378°N 1.462°W
- Grid reference: SK358869
- Owner: Network Rail
- Manager: East Midlands Railway
- Transit authority: Travel South Yorkshire
- Platforms: 11: 9 train, 2 tram (Note: The National Rail platforms are numbered 1–8 and 2C. In addition to the two operational Supertram platforms, three disused platforms – from the previous site of the Sheffield station tram stop before it was relocated in 2002 – remain extant and are occasionally used during engineering works, but no scheduled services call at them.)

Other information
- Station code: SHF
- Fare zone: Sheffield
- Classification: DfT category B

Key dates
- 1870: Opened as Pond Street
- 1905: Extension
- 1956: Rooftop removed
- 1973: Power signal box built
- 1994: Supertram platforms opened
- 2006: Major redevelopment completed

Passengers
- 2020/21: ▼1.907 million
- Interchange: ▼0.179 million
- 2021/22: ▲7.206 million
- Interchange: ▲0.625 million
- 2022/23: ▲8.677 million
- Interchange: ▲0.766 million
- 2023/24: ▲9.449 million
- Interchange: ▲0.865 million
- 2024/25: ▲10.315 million
- Interchange: ▲0.938 million
- Tram routes & stop: B P: Sheffield Station; Sheffield Hallam University
Location
Notes
- Passenger statistics from the Office of Rail and Road

Sheffield station (formerly Pond Street (Note: Batty refers to the station as Pond Street; however, Fox notes that, although the name appears on some Midland Railway maps, the station has never been known locally by this name or referred to as such in timetables.) and later Sheffield Midland) is a combined railway station and tram stop in the city of Sheffield, in South Yorkshire, England; it is the busiest station in the county and the third busiest in the Yorkshire & the Humber region, after Leeds and York. The South Yorkshire Supertram stop lies adjacent to the main station.

== History ==
=== 1870–1960 ===
The interior stonework and iron roof on the station concourse

The station was opened in 1870 by the Midland Railway to the designs of the company architect John Holloway Sanders. It was the fifth and last station to be built in Sheffield city centre.

The station was built on the New Line, which ran between Grimesthorpe Junction, on the former Sheffield and Rotherham Railway, and Tapton Junction, just north of Chesterfield. This line replaced the Midland Railway's previous route, the 'old road', to London, which ran from Sheffield Wicker via Rotherham Masborough.

The new line and station were built in spite of some controversy and opposition locally. The Duke of Norfolk, who owned land in the area, insisted that the southern approach be in a tunnel and the land known as The Farm landscaped to prevent the line being seen. Some years later, the tunnel was opened out into a cutting. Sheffield Corporation was so concerned about the eastern side of the city being cut off from the city centre that it insisted that public access be preserved across the railway site.

The station and Pond Street goods depot were opened on a damp and cold day, without any celebrations. There were originally different entrances for each passenger class. The original station buildings have been preserved and are between island platforms 2 to 5.

The station was given two extra platforms and a new frontage in 1905, at a cost of £215,000. (Note: Equivalent to £22,600,000 in 2025.) The enlargements consisted of creating an island platform out of the old platform 1, and building a new platform 1 and a new entrance; these works were overseen by the chief architect to the Midland Railway, Charles Trubshaw.

Offices were built at the north end of the 300 feet (91 m) long carriageway rooftop. A large parcels office was built to the south of the main buildings. Two footbridges connected the platforms: one to the north for passengers, with the other to the south for station staff and parcels. The tracks were covered by two overall roofs. The older and larger spanned platforms 5 and 6, and an identical structure can still be viewed today at the former Bath Green Park station. Wartime damage put the roofs beyond economic repair; hence, they were removed in the autumn of 1956 and replaced by low-level awnings.

=== 1960–2002 ===
The 1960s saw the introduction of the Classes 45 and 46 diesel-electric locomotives, known as Peaks. Sheaf House was built in 1965 adjacent to the station to house British Rail's Sheffield Division headquarters. As part of the reconstruction of the area, as the Gateway to Sheffield, it was demolished in early 2006.

In 1970, the city's other main station, Sheffield Victoria, was closed and its remaining services from Penistone were diverted until 1981 via a cumbersome reversal. The Pullman service between Victoria and London King's Cross, including the morning and evening Master Cutler now ran onto the East Coast Main Line (ECML) via Retford from Sheffield Midland instead. This was the third route used by the train of that name; originally it had run to London Marylebone. The station was resignalled in 1972 and its track layout remodelled. British Rail introduced the High Speed Train (HST) to Sheffield on the Midland Main Line in 1984. The cross-country services had seen the introduction of the HSTs in 1982. On 21 December 1991, the station was flooded by the river Sheaf, which flows under it. A log that was part of the debris commemorates the event on platform 5.

In 1991, construction of the new South Yorkshire Supertram network began and, by late 1994, Sheffield Midland was connected to the network, after the opening of the line between Fitzalan Square in the city centre and Spring Lane, to the east of the station.

=== 2002–present ===
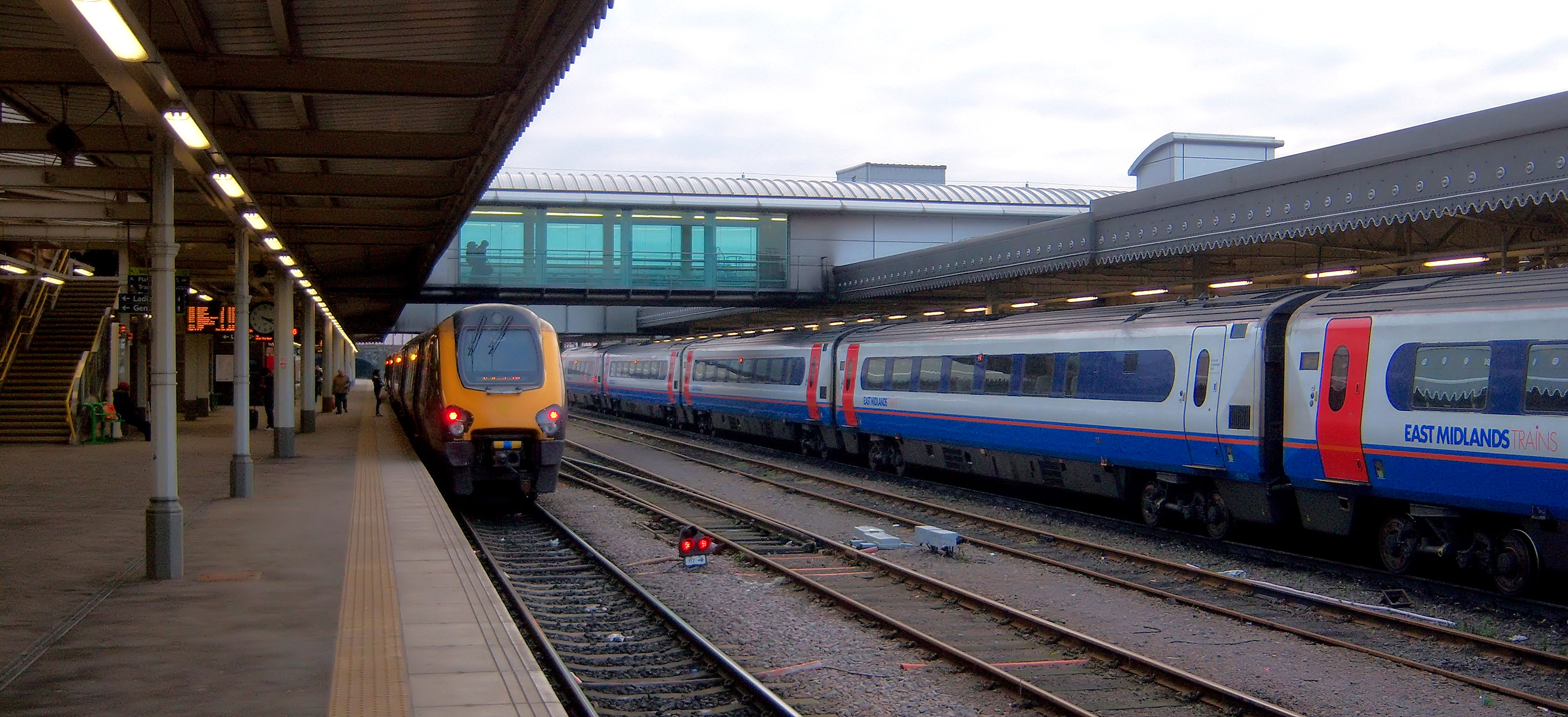
CrossCountry and East Midlands Trains services at platforms 6 and 7

The station concourse in 2026

In 2002, Midland Mainline, as the main train operating company of the station, instigated a major regeneration. Before this, a taxi rank was located inside what is now the main concourse and the new entrance hall. The stone façade of the station was sandblasted and its archways filled with unobstructed windows to improve views both from inside and out. Other changes included the improvement of platform surfaces and the addition of a pedestrian bridge connecting the station concourse with the South Yorkshire Supertram stop at the far side of the station.

To coincide with the regeneration of the station, Sheaf Square was rebuilt as part of a project designed to create the Gateway to Sheffield. The station and the square form part of a route that leads passengers through the square past the 263 feet (80 m) Cutting Edge water feature, up Howard Street and into the Heart of the City; this won the Project of the Year in the 2006 National Rail Awards.

On 11 November 2007, East Midlands Trains, an amalgamation of Midland Mainline and part of Central Trains, took over the management of the station.

In December 2009, following the restoration of the station, the 'Sheffield Tap public house opened next to platform 1B. The room is located within the main station building; it had been used as a store room for 35 years, but was used for much longer as a bar and restaurant, catering for first class passengers since 1904. The bar has a restored early 20th century interior and offers a selection of quality cask ales and beers from around the world. Since opening, the bar has won the National Railway Heritage Award and the Cask Ale pub of the year award.

In October 2010, East Midlands Trains initiated £10 million worth of improvements to its stations. Sheffield received renovated waiting rooms, toilet facilities and upgraded security systems amongst its improvements.

In 2011, a new first class lounge was opened on platform 5, as part of these improvements. The lounge was opened by the Master Cutler, Professor Bill Speirs, who was joined by 50 top business leaders from city and the surrounding area.

=== Footbridge controversy ===
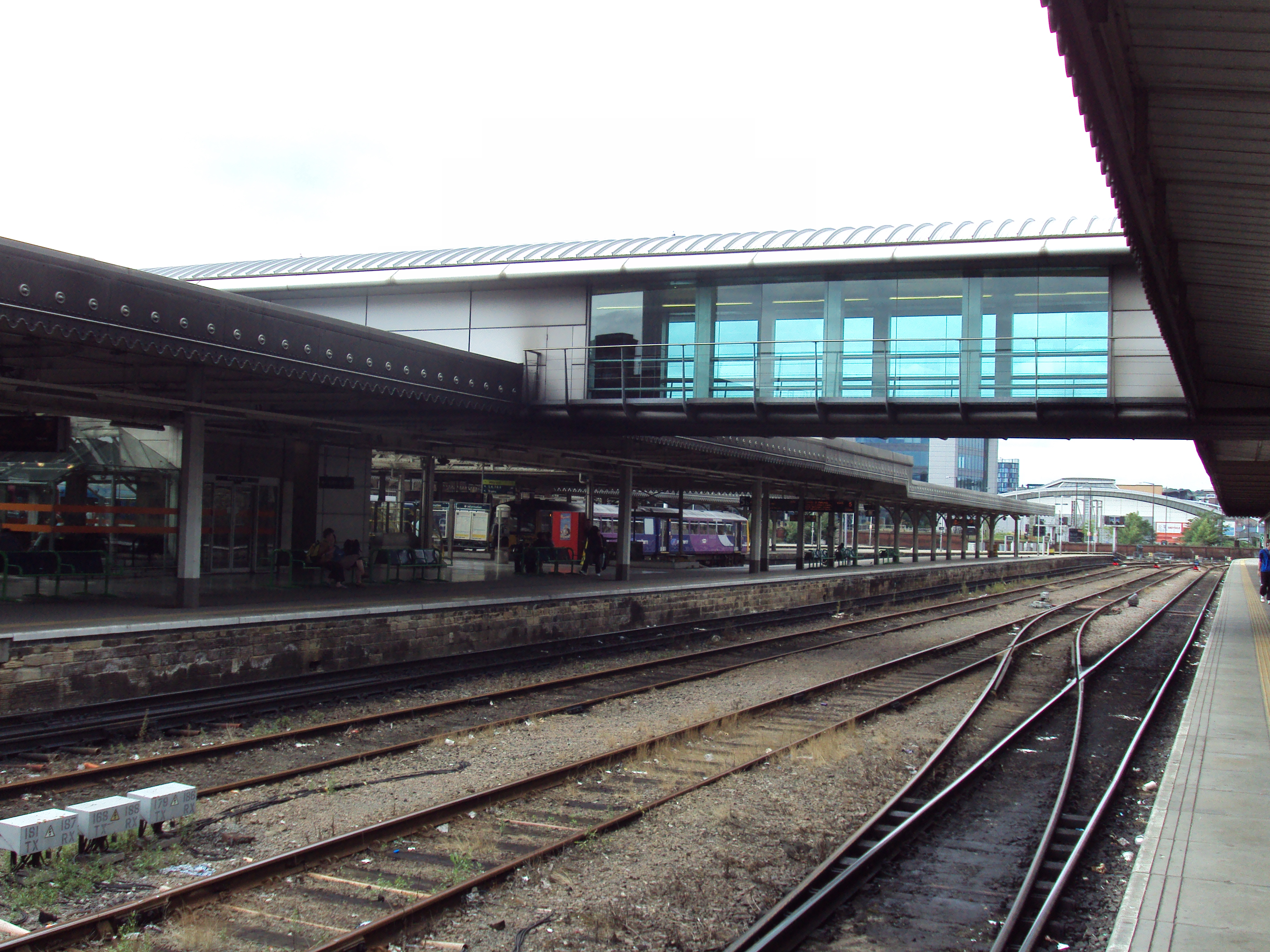
The bridge at the centre of some controversy (2008)

In 2008, East Midlands Trains revealed its intention to restrict access to parts of the station by installing ticket barriers, to try to prevent passengers from travelling without a ticket. This proposal met with widespread opposition from residents and Council members because the footbridge would be closed off to non-ticket holders; it would sever a popular thoroughfare from the Norfolk Park residential area and the Supertram stop on one side, to the station travel centre, the bus interchange, the city centre and the city centre campus of Sheffield Hallam University on the other.

On 6 May 2009, East Midlands Trains implemented its proposal, using temporary barriers and ticket inspectors to bar access to the footbridge to non-ticket holders; local residents and Supertram passengers were forced to use longer routes around the station.

In November 2009, East Midlands Trains was refused planning permission for the barriers by the council but, in February 2010, announced it would apply again. The transport secretary, Lord Adonis, announced in April 2010 that barriers would not be installed until a second bridge was built to maintain a thoroughfare for non-ticket holders.

From September 2010, East Midlands Trains used uniformed staff to prevent local residents using the footbridge. At the same time, Sheffield City Council explored the possibility of turning the bridge into a public right-of-way to resolve the matter. In late 2010, it was reported that the Deputy Prime Minister, Nick Clegg, MP for Sheffield Hallam, might intervene to resolve the impasse. In March 2012, transport minister, Justine Greening, offered £3 million to build a new footbridge to resolve the problem.

Tickets are not currently required to enter the station or to use the footbridge, which gives access to the Sheffield Station tram stop to the east.

== Facilities ==
Sheaf Square with the station in the background

The main station entrance, facing Sheaf Square, is the location of the main concourse and most of the station's facilities. The ticket office, ticket machines, information desk and a number of retail units are located there, along with public toilets and cash machines. There are further shops and facilities on the island platforms and in the Supertram entrance hall, at the far side of the station. There are waiting rooms on the island platforms and the East Midlands Railway first class lounge is within the station buildings, on platform 5.

There is a 678-space car park situated next to the main station building (Q Park) and there is a reserved parking area for blue badge holders in the main station building; next to this, there is a taxi rank. Bicycle storage is provided on platforms 1a and 3a. The whole station, including the platforms, concourse and Supertram stop, is accessible to disabled passengers.

== Layout ==
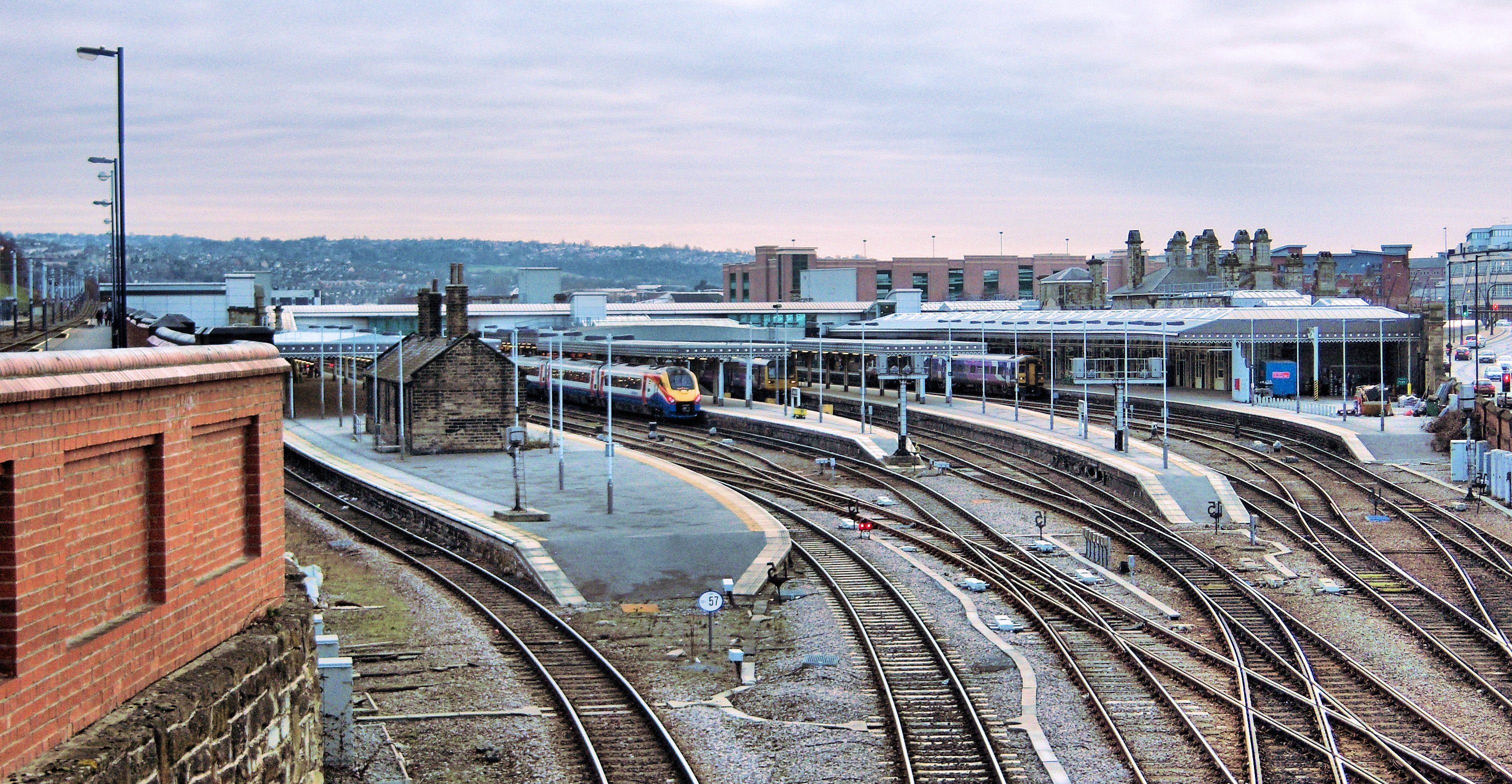
A panoramic view of the station; the Supertram stop is on the left, with the city centre and Sheaf Street on the right

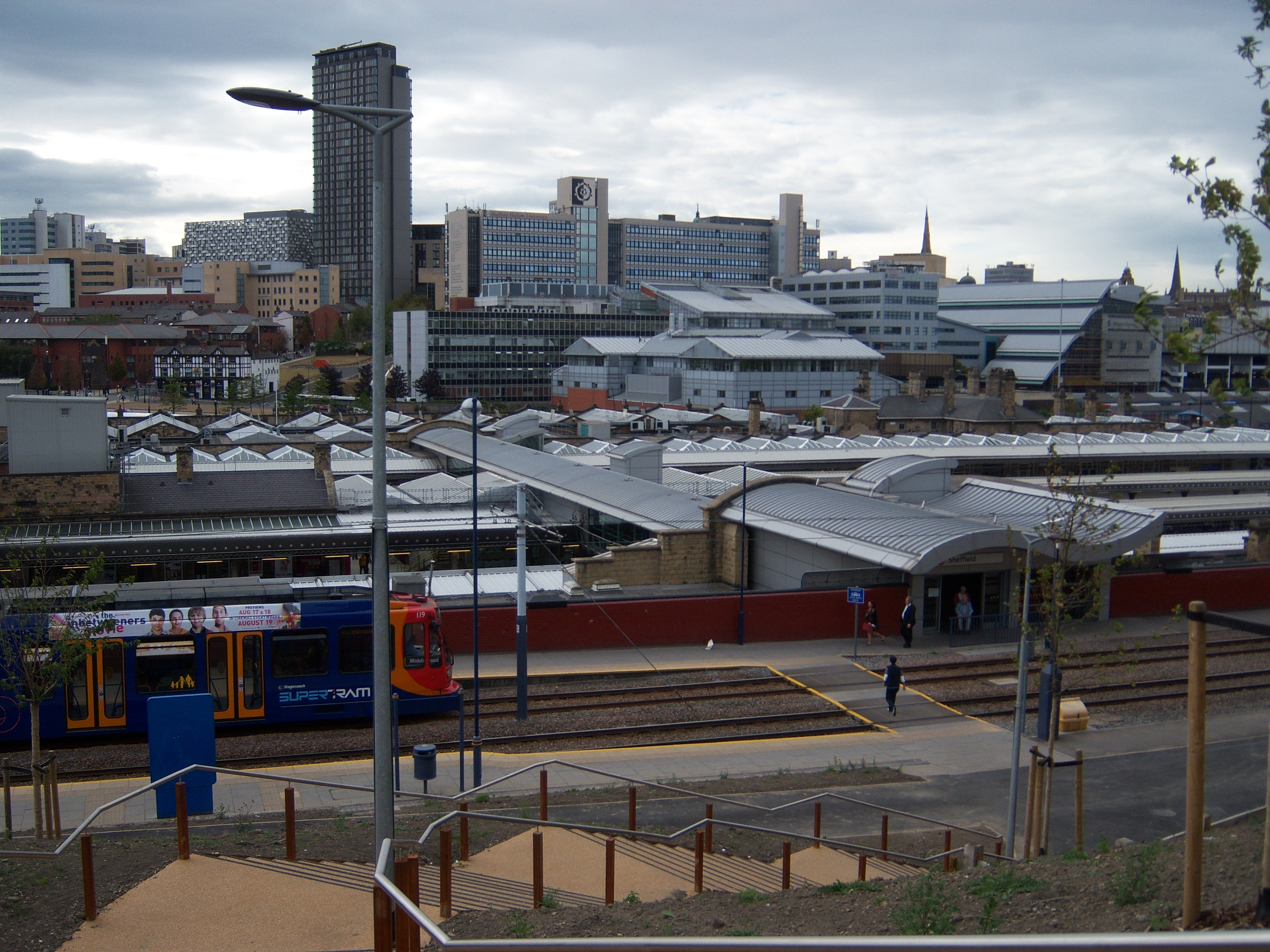
The station from the east. In the foreground are the Supertram stop and the station entrance hall; in the distance is the city centre

The building at the center of the island with platforms 2a-5b

The station is designed to accommodate both through and terminating trains. It is divided into four parts, which are connected by a large footbridge:

1. the main building/concourse and platforms 1a/1b
2. the first island with platforms 2a-5b
3. the second island with platforms 6a-8b
4. the adjoining Supertram stop.

The National Rail station has nine platforms, numbered 1 to 8 and 2C. Platforms 2C, 3, 4 and 7 can be used by terminating trains only; 1, 3 and 4 are divided into 'A' and 'B' sections to allow a brief stabling of terminating services before they are scheduled to depart.

The station has four through lines, which are used for through running or, more commonly, for stabling stock. Between platforms 5 and 6, these are known as "1-Up" and "2-Up"; (Note: They are on the up or London-bound side of the station.) between the "through road" with a direct path through the station between platforms 1 and 2; or by a central crossover to the north end of platform 1 (1b), and "down station siding".

Prior to the 1972 multiple-aspect signalling (MAS) scheme, the southern half of the current platform 8 was called platform 9. Trains from the north from platform 9 could avoid trains stood at platform 8 via an additional through line.

The Sheffield Station tram stop, on the South Yorkshire Supertram network, was built on top of a walled embankment high above platform 8 on the eastern side of the station. It was connected to platform 6 of the main station by a staircase.

It was rebuilt and refurbished in 2002. A new footbridge connected the tram stop with the railway station. Following the opening of the new stop and platforms, the old platforms were left in situ and are only used in times of engineering works, where additional platform space is needed.

== Services ==
The station is served by four train operating companies, which provide the following general off-peak services in trains per hour/day (tph/tpd):

East Midlands Railway:

- 2 tph to London St Pancras, via Chesterfield, Derby and Leicester; three named passenger trains (the Master Cutler, Sheffield Continental and South Yorkshireman) run on this service.
- 1 tph to Norwich, via Nottingham.
- 1 tph to Liverpool Lime Street, via Manchester Piccadilly.

CrossCountry:

- 1 tph to Edinburgh Waverley, via Leeds and Newcastle; of which:
  - 2 tpd continue to Glasgow Central
- 1 tp2h to Newcastle, via Doncaster and York
- 3 tpd to York, via Doncaster
- 1 tph to Plymouth, via Derby, Birmingham New Street, Bristol Temple Meads and Exeter St Davids; of which:
  - 1 tpd continues to Penzance
- 1 tp2h to Reading, via Derby, Birmingham New Street and Oxford.

Northern Trains:

- 2 tph to Doncaster, via Meadowhall and Rotherham; of which:
  - 1 tph continues to Adwick
- 1 tph to Huddersfield, via Meadowhall, Barnsley and Penistone
- 2 tph to Leeds, via Barnsley and Wakefield Kirkgate (fast)
- 1 tph to Leeds, calling only at Wakefield Westgate
- 1 tph to Leeds, via Barnsley, Wakefield Kirkgate and Castleford (stopping)
- 1 tph to Leeds, via Moorthorpe and Wakefield Westgate
- 1 tph to Lincoln, via Worksop and Retford
- 1 tph to Manchester Piccadilly, via New Mills Central
- 1 tph to Nottingham, via Chesterfield
- 1 tph to Scarborough, via Doncaster, Hull Paragon and Bridlington
- 3 tpd to York, via Moorthorpe and Sherburn-in-Elmet.

TransPennine Express:

- 1 tph to Liverpool Lime Street, via Manchester Piccadilly
- 1 tph to Cleethorpes, via Doncaster.

| Preceding station | National Rail | Following station |
|---|---|---|
| Derby | CrossCountry Reading-Newcastle | Doncaster |
| Chesterfield Peak hours only | CrossCountry Reading-Newcastle | Doncaster |
| Chesterfield | CrossCountry Cross Country Route | Wakefield Westgate |
| Chesterfield | East Midlands Railway Liverpool-Norwich | Stockport |
| Dronfield | East Midlands Railway Liverpool-Norwich | Dore & Totley (Limited service) |
| Chesterfield | East Midlands Railway Midland Main Line | Terminus |
| Stockport | TransPennine Express South TransPennine | Meadowhall |
| Dore & Totley (Limited service) | TransPennine Express South TransPennine | Meadowhall |
| Darnall | Northern Trains Leeds-Lincoln | Meadowhall |
| Terminus | Northern Trains Sheffield-Cleethorpes (Llimited service) | Worksop |
| Terminus | Northern Trains Hope Valley Line | Dore & Totley |
| Terminus | Northern Trains Dearne Valley Line | Meadowhall |
| Terminus | Northern Trains Hallam Line | Meadowhall |
| Terminus | Northern Trains Penistone Line | Meadowhall |
| Terminus | Northern Trains Wakefield Line | Meadowhall |
| Dronfield | Northern Trains Nottingham-Leeds | Meadowhall |
| | Future services | |
| Terminus | Hull Trains East Coast Main Line | Woodhouse |
| Lincoln | Northern Trains; Lincoln-Leeds | Meadowhall |
| Terminus | Northern Trains; Sheffield-Hull | Doncaster |
| Wakefield Westgate | Northern Trains; Bradford Interchange-Nottingham | Chesterfield |
| Manchester Piccadilly | TBA; Northern Powerhouse Rail | Terminus |
| Terminus | TBA; Northern Powerhouse Rail | Doncaster |
| Terminus | TBA; Northern Powerhouse Rail | Leeds |
| | Historical railways | |
| Heeley; Line open, station closed | Midland Railway; Midland Main Line | Attercliffe Road; Line open, station closed |

== Future ==
In the 2010 Rail Utilisation Strategy, it quoted that the Midland Main Line north of Bedford would be electrified in 2020. The line is currently one of the few major main lines that is not electrified; the plan found that the project would provide significantly enhanced services and significant financial savings.

In July 2017, the transport secretary, Chris Grayling, announced the electrification plan for the remainder of the Midland Main Line would not go ahead as previously planned. Instead the section from Clay Cross, in Derbyshire, to Sheffield would be electrified by 2033, as part of the planned HS2 line. As an interim measure, bi-mode trains were to be used, as it was claimed that they offer benefits similar to high speed electric trains. A National Audit Office report said: "In the case of Midland Main Line, bi-mode trains with the required speed and acceleration did not exist when the Secretary of State made his decision."

The MP for Loughborough (Note: Loughborough was another area to have been served by the proposed electrification scheme.) and chair of the Treasury Select Committee, Nicky Morgan, said of the revised plans: "Now we see the decision to cancel it was based on fantasy trains that didn't even exist and the Midlands being a guinea pig for an untested technology."

== South Yorkshire Supertram stop ==
Sheffield Station tram stop has direct interchange with the railway station. It was built on top of a walled embankment that formerly carried Granville Street past the station; this was downgraded to a lineside public footpath when the embankment was repurposed to carry the Supertram line. The stop also serves the city campus of Sheffield Hallam University and the Park Hill estate, above the railway station.

The stop opened on 22 August 1994 and originally had three platforms: two on the northbound track, (Note: Inbound to the city centre.) to allow for terminating Purple route services prior to their extension to cathedral in the city centre; it was connected to platform 6 of the main station by a simple staircase.

In line with the refurbishment of the rest of the station in the early 2000s, the tram stop was rebuilt in 2002 around 150 metres (500 ft) to the south of the existing platforms. Along with two new platforms, a ticket hall was constructed at the end of the main station footbridge over the top of platform 8, providing a direct connection from the tram stop to the station footbridge and the rest of the main line station.

The Blue route has a peak frequency of 5 trams per hour (every 12 minutes); the Purple route runs hourly Monday−Saturday and up to every 30 minutes on Sundays.

| Preceding station | South Yorkshire Supertram | Following station |
|---|---|---|
| Fitzalan Square towards Malin Bridge | Blue Route | Granville Road towards Halfway |
| Fitzalan Square towards Cathedral | Purple Route | Granville Road towards Herdings Park |
