= Sheffield and Rotherham Railway =

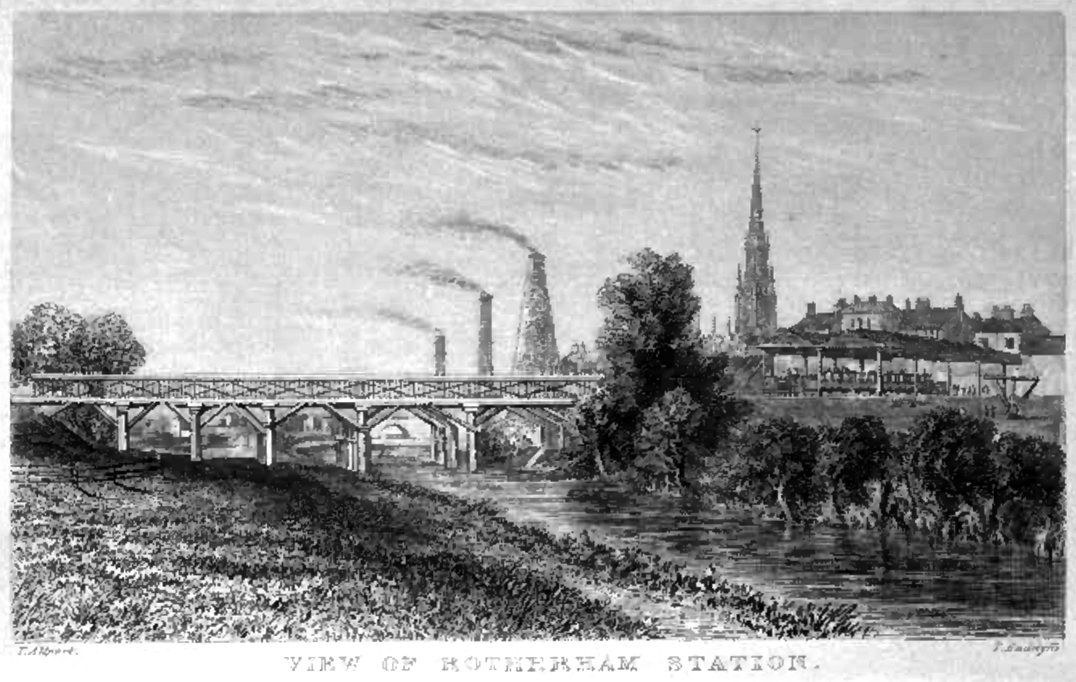
- Westgate Station c. 1840

Overview
- Locale: South Yorkshire, England

Service
- Type: Heavy rail

History
- Opened: 31 October 1838
- Closed: 21 July 1845 (line and operations taken over by the Midland Railway)

Technical
- Line length: 5 miles (8.0 km)
- Track gauge: 4 ft 8 1/2 in (1,435 mm) standard gauge

The Sheffield and Rotherham Railway was a railway line in England, between the named places. The North Midland Railway was being promoted but its route was planned to go through Rotherham and by-pass Sheffield, so the S&RR was built as a connecting line. It opened in 1838. In Sheffield it opened a terminal station at Wicker, and in Rotherham at Westgate. When the NMR opened in 1840 a connecting curve was made between the two routes.

The opening of the S&RR encouraged heavy industry to be located along its route in Sheffield. The S&RR was absorbed by the much larger Midland Railway in 1845. The Wicker passenger terminal was cramped and restrictive and in 1870 the Midland Railway opened a new access route to Sheffield from the south, via Bradway Tunnel, and a new main station in Sheffield. Trains proceeding north from the new station joined the S&RR route, which continued in use. Over the years a number of branch lines were constructed diverging from the S&RR line, and in 1987 a connection was made into another line at Rotherham, giving access to a more central passenger station there. Nearly the whole extent of the original S&RR line continues in main line use in 2023.

== Background ==
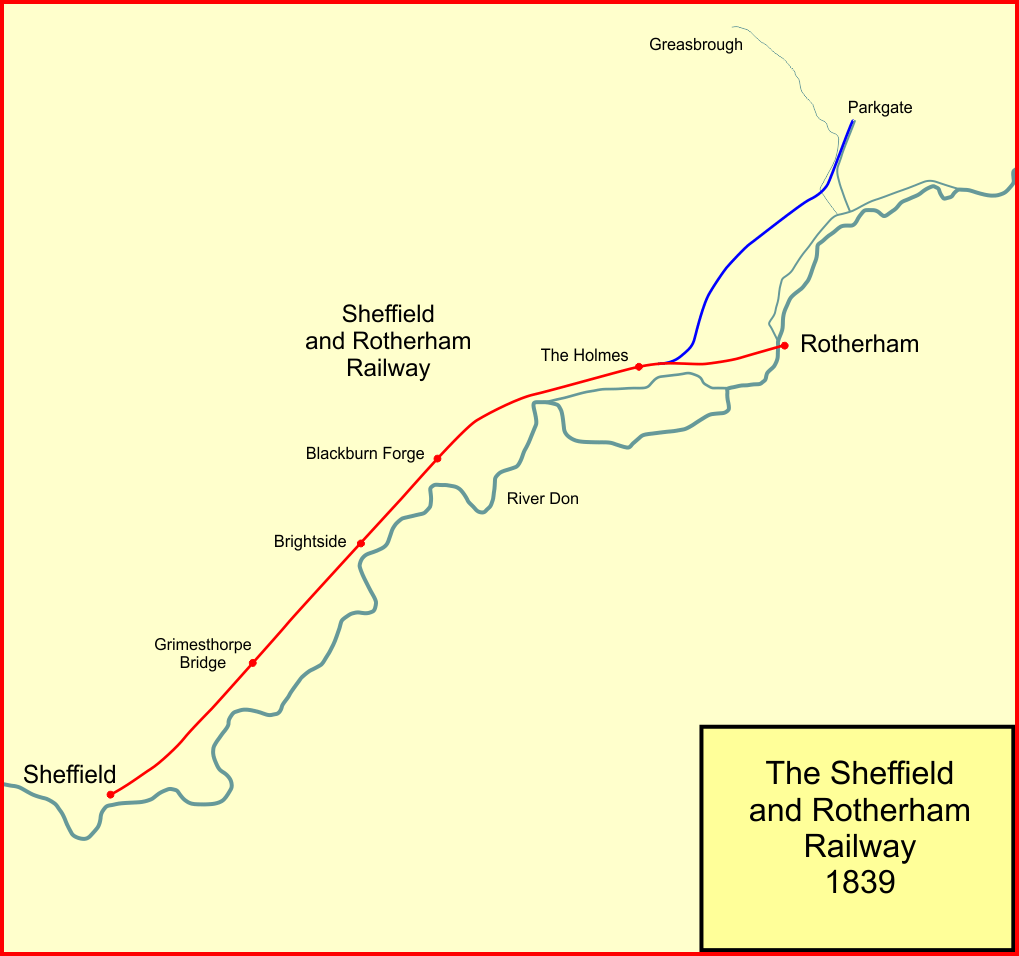
Sheffield and Rotherham Railway in 1839

Steel making had developed as a prime industry in Sheffield well before the end of the eighteenth century. A wooden wagonway was in existence before 1729, bringing coal into the town, but it was out of use by the 1770s. In 1774 a new wagonway was opened bringing coal into the centre, and bringing about a remarkable reduction in the cost of coal. However the coal owner, the Duke of Norfolk, seems to have been reluctant to continue his business on that basis, and he stopped the supply, provoking a considerable riot in Sheffield.

A proper railway was the answer, but the difficult topography made the idea challenging. A Sheffield and Manchester Railway was proposed in 1830, engineered by George Stephenson; Four counterbalanced inclined planes would be needed. The scheme involved passenger trains being hauled up by heavier limestone wagons descending; there would be a passing loop inside a tunnel. The scheme was not taken further.

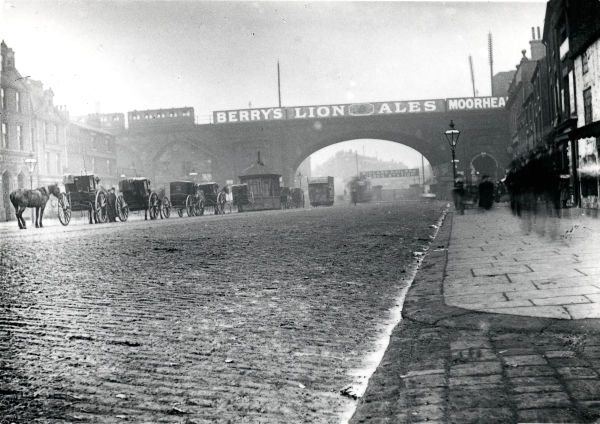
The Wicker station building may be seen in the background through the arch, downgraded to goods station status, photographed about 1898

Parliamentary bills for a railway between Rotherham and Sheffield were submitted in 1834 and 1835 without success, but a project for the North Midland Railway from Derby to Leeds was submitted to Parliament for the 1836 session. Sheffield is located in a marked topographical depression, and the engineer for the North Midland Railway, George Stephenson, was against steep railway gradients because of the low tractive power of contemporary locomotives. Accordingly his planned line by-passed Sheffield, passing instead through Masbrough, in Rotherham. This was not a popular arrangement in Sheffield, and opposition was expressed to Stephenson, but in the event local interests acquiesced in his recommended main line, and that a revived Sheffield and Rotherham scheme was appropriate.

== Sheffield and Rotherham Railway ==
=== Design and authorisation ===
A project design was quickly prepared: much work had already been done in surveying the land between Rotherham and Sheffield, in connection with earlier schemes for a canal. The railway was aligned approximately north-northeast so that it also followed a gentle gradient, except for a short section of 1 in 68 at the Rotherham terminus. The route was designed to make use of an alignment similar to that which was planned for the canal. The line was planned to run from the Wicker in Sheffield to Westgate in Rotherham, a distance of five miles (8.0 km). (Note: The Sheffield terminal is described by Joy as "central". It was located immediately north of the later Manchester, Sheffield and Lincolnshire Railway station site, and nowadays would be considered to be to the north of central Sheffield.)

When the details of the proposed line were published, a hundred and twenty inhabitants of Rotherham headed by their vicar petitioned against the bill, because they thought the canal and the turnpike furnished sufficient accommodation between the two towns, and because they dreaded an incursion of the idle, drunken, and dissolute portion of the Sheffield people as a consequence of increasing the facilities of transit.

Sheffield and Rotherham Railway Act 1836
- Act of Parliament
- Parliament of the United Kingdom
- Long title: An Act for making a Railway from Sheffield to Rotherham, with a Branch therefrom to Greasbrough Canal, all in the West Riding of the County of York.
- Citation: 6 & 7 Will. 4. c. cix

Dates
- Royal assent: 4 July 1836

Other legislation
- Repealed by: Sheffield and Rotherham and Midland Railways Consolidation Act 1845

Status: Repealed

Text of statute as originally enacted

The Sheffield & Rotherham Railway was incorporated by the Sheffield and Rotherham Railway Act 1836 (6 & 7 Will. 4. c. cix) on 4 July 1836. The North Midland Railway received its authorisation on the same day, Frederick Swanwick was the engineer of the S&RR. The line was of standard gauge, using fish-bellied cast iron rails mostly on stone blocks, with some untreated larch sleepers.

Stations were at Sheffield, Grimesthorpe Bridge, Brightside, Blackburn Forge, Holmes, and Rotherham, but only the two end termini were open on the first days.

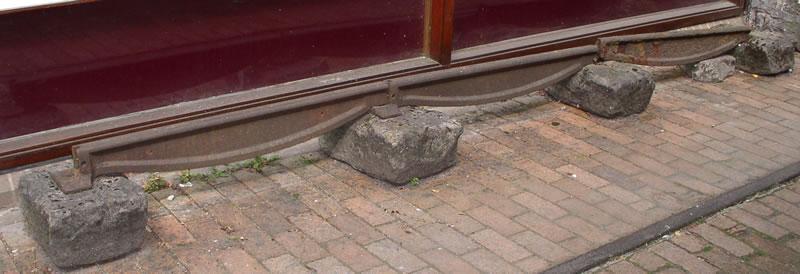
Example of fishbelly rail

=== Opening and early operation ===
A ceremonial opening of the single-track main line of the S&RR took place on 31 October 1838, although earthworks were unfinished and the second track had not been laid. The first train on that day conveyed Earl Fitzwilliam and other guests to Rotherham; a breakfast followed by celebratory speeches took place at the Court House. The guests were later returned by train to Sheffield. The initial journey was described as a 'very elegant' train of yellow-painted carriages leaving the 'handsome and spacious shed' at Wicker. The line opened to the general public on the following day, 1 November 1838. The first train that day was pulled by the locomotive Victory, and consisted of six yellow and black carriages, holding 300 passengers. The line's trackside, trees and bridges were filled with crowds who had attended for the event. Victory travelled to Rotherham in 17 minutes. The second outward train left two minutes later, hauled by the locomotive London.

Industrial activity in Sheffield created a considerable demand for coal and other minerals, and a branch line from the Greasbrough Canal to Holmes, serving local collieries, was opened on 7 August 1839. It was built by the North Midland Railway (which had not yet reached the area) and leased to the S&RR. It made an end-on connection with the Earl of Fitzwilliam's private railways. The end of the branch was at Park Gate, and the site developed as a coking works and chemical plant, lasting at least into the 1960s.

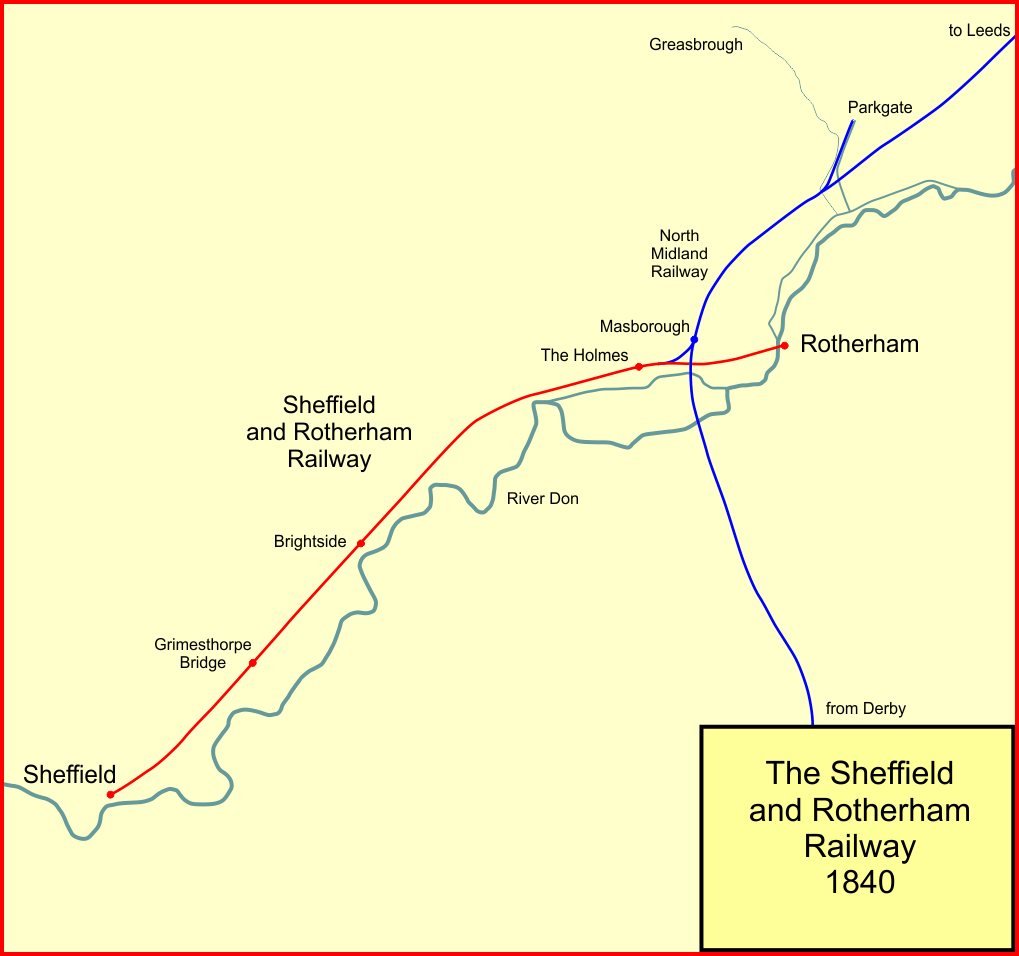
Sheffield and Rotherham Railway in 1840

On 11 May 1840 the North Midland Railway opened its line from Derby to its own Rotherham station, named Masbrough. (Note: The district is known as Masbrough and the station name was spelt this on opening. From 1896 the station was called “Masborough and Rotherham” and the misspelling remained in future renamings".) The Greasbrough Canal line now served additionally as a west-to-north connection between the S&RR and the NMR, as the Greasbrough line had been laid out to run alongside the planned NMR alignment. The NMR opened its continuation northwards to Leeds on 1 July 1840.

The portion from Masbrough to Derby had been specially expedited in order to form a junction with the Sheffield and Rotherham Company's system, giving Sheffield a direct railway connection. The decision had been taken in April 1840 by the Sheffield and Rotherham board to allow through working of trains off the North Midland line into Sheffield, and the S&RR timetable was adjusted to facilitate that. Trains from Derby reversed at the Masborough station.

An early attempt at marketing tourism was made: "An omnibus would run from Sheffield Station on the arrival of each train (fare 4d)... through the heart of the town... to within a few minutes' walk of the beautiful Botanic Gardens."

The opening meant that through journeys to London were now possible, and a remarkable publicity stunt was undertaken. Mr W Vickers, the S&RR Chairman, sent the belt-driven locomotive Sheffield and a single coach on the entire journey from Sheffield to London. The excursion started on Monday 11 May and arrival was expected on Wednesday 13. Mr and Mrs Vickers were the only passengers as far as Derby, where they were joined by George Stephenson and Michael Longridge, a producer of wrought iron rails. The journey was apparently successful, but the London and Birmingham Railway demanded the sum of £10 as a penalty for running over their line without giving the necessary 14 days' notice.

Whishaw, writing in 1842, said that the passenger train service consisted of fourteen trains each way daily, Monday to Saturday, of which five ran to the NMR Masbrough station. There were nine trains each way on Sundays. He reported that in the first six months of 1840, the line ran at a loss of £290 on turnover of £1,560 (19%).

== Connecting to the SA&MR ==
The S&RR had been the first railway in the area, but as a short line it had limited potential, and the directors saw that expansion was essential. The Sheffield, Ashton-under-Lyne and Manchester Railway was then under construction, and was to have a Sheffield station very close to the Wicker station of the S&RR. In the summer of 1843, the directors of the S&RR approached the SA&MR, suggesting that a short junction line between them should be made, and the S&RR Wicker station used by both companies. The facilities at Wicker were limited: it had only a single passenger platform. It seemed improbable that Wicker could handle all the Manchester traffic of the SA&MR as well as all the northward and southward traffic of the Midland Railway. Moreover, at the time the SA&MR were supporting a Chesterfield line competing with the NMR, and the S&RR proposition was declined.

In fact the SA&MR opened its line in Sheffield on 14 July 1845; the Sheffield station was Bridgehouses, a short distance west of the later (1851) Sheffield Victoria station. Although use of the S&RR Wicker station had been turned down, the construction of a connection was sensible enough, and this opened on 1 January 1847 from Bridgehouses to Wicker. It was steeply graded at 1 in 36 and ran through Spital Hill Tunnel; it was only ever used for limited exchange of goods traffic.

== Worked, and later absorbed, by the Midland Railway ==
The S&RR line was worked by the Midland Railway from 10 October 1844: the Midland Railway was formed on 10 May 1844 by the amalgamation of the North Midland Railway and certain other companies.

Sheffield and Rotherham and Midland Railways Consolidation Act 1845
- Act of Parliament
- Parliament of the United Kingdom
- Long title: An Act for authorizing the Consolidation of the Sheffield and Rotherham Railway with the Midland Railways, and for making a Branch Railway from and other Works in connexion with the said Sheffield and Rotherham Railway.
- Citation: 8 & 9 Vict. c. xc

Dates
- Royal assent: 21 July 1845

As competing railways developed in the general area, the Midland Railway became concerned that it might lose access to Sheffield if the S&RR was acquired by a competitor. It therefore decided that the S&RR should be vested in the Midland. The MR issued Sheffield and Rotherham preference shares paying 6% on the S&RR share capital of £150,000 in perpetuity. The Sheffield and Rotherham and Midland Railways Consolidation Act 1845 (8 & 9 Vict. c. xc) for vesting the line in the Midland was passed on 21 July 1845, at which date the S&RR ceased to exist. The preference shares were converted under the Midland Railway Act 1897 (60 & 61 Vict. c. clxxxiii).

== Railway connections ==
As the first railway in the locality, the Sheffield and Rotherham Railway main line became an important centre of industrial growth in Sheffield, and also the trunk of a number of additional connecting lines.

=== South Yorkshire Railway ===
The South Yorkshire Railway was slowly building a complex network in the area, and on 10 November 1849, it opened a section from Doncaster to Swinton, joining the Midland Railway there. It had running powers from there into Sheffield (Wicker) over the Midland and the former S&RR line. There were four passenger trains each way daily.

On 9 September 1854 the SYR opened a more direct connection with the S&RR; it ran from Barnsley by reversal at Wombwell, and was referred to as the Chapeltown branch, or more colourfully the Blackburn Valley Line. It joined the S&RR at Blackburn Valley Junction, between Brightside and Wincobank. The passenger service to Sheffield (S&RR) did not open until November 1854. (Note: According to Batty; Franks says November 1855.) There had been some delay in agreeing this arrangement, because of the limited capacity at Wicker station, which was now becoming extremely congested.

=== Midland Railway southern access to Sheffield ===
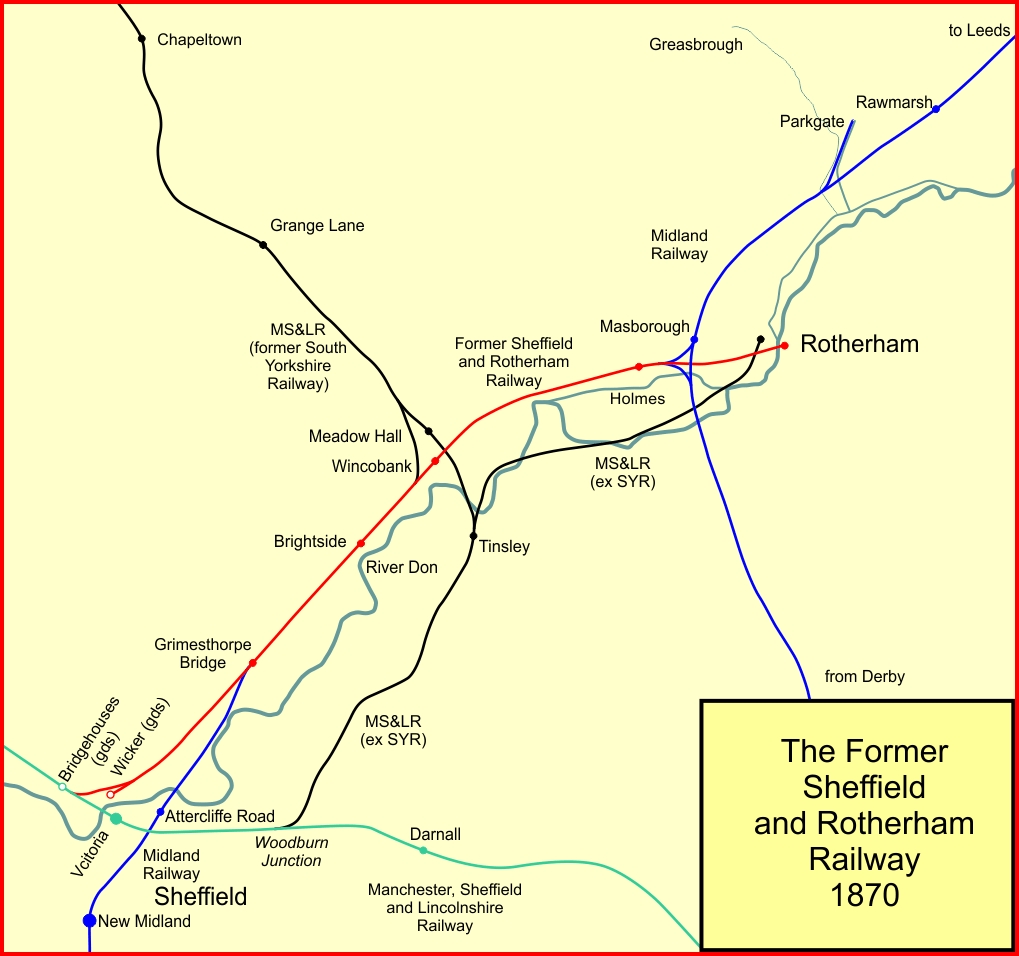
Sheffield and Rotherham Railway in 1870

The original access to Sheffield, for what became the Midland Railway, involved going to Rotherham and then into Sheffield from the east over the former S&RR. This roundabout route, and the use of Wicker station as the Sheffield terminus, increasingly became a cause of dissatisfaction, and the Midland determined to do something about it. This materialised as a new line from Tapton Junction, north of Chesterfield, to a new Sheffield station, and a connection from there to the S&RR line at Grimesthorpe Junction. George Stephenson's objection to such a route had been based on the available power of contemporary locomotives, and by this time the technology had progressed. The new line opened on 1 February 1870. The large, new station was known as Sheffield New Midland station until 1876. The Wicker station closed to passengers on the same day.

=== Masborough south curve ===
The connection at Masborough between the S&RR and the former North Midland Railway was north facing, and trains between points west of Sheffield and the south had to reverse at Rotherham, or after 1870 travel via the new Sheffield station. On 28 November 1881 a south curve, from Holmes Junction to Masborough South Junction, was provided, at first to goods traffic only; passenger trains started to use the curve from 1 January 1890. It was later closed to ordinary passenger traffic on 5 July 1954, and completely in 1978.

=== Sheffield District Railway ===
The Sheffield District Railway was a short connecting line, designed to give access to central Sheffield to the Lancashire, Derbyshire and East Coast Railway and the Great Eastern Railway. It opened from Treeton Junction (on the former North Midland Railway route) to Brightside Junction on the former S&RR on 21 May 1900. (Note: Gough says opened to goods 28 May and passengers 30 May 1900.) In addition an extensive goods depot was built at Attercliffe, also accessed off the S&RR route. The Midland Railway co-operated with these new connections.

In the 1960s the short main line of the District Railway formed the core of the new Tinsley Marshalling Yard.

=== New connection to Rotherham Central ===
The former South Yorkshire Railway station at Rotherham had closed to passengers in 1966. From that point the SYR route – now goods only – paralleled the former NMR route as far as Swinton, but passenger trains used Masborough station as the calling point for Rotherham. Masborough was not considered convenient for the central area of Rotherham. The route of the original Rotherham Westgate line from Holmes Junction was still available, and intersected the former SYR route. In 1987 a connection was made and Rotherham Central station was reinstated as the station for the town. Masborough closed in 1988, although non-stopping trains still used that route.

== Locomotives and rolling stock ==
Among the first of the duties which fell to Isaac Dodds was designing the railway's first engine The Cutler. While up to that time, locomotive boilers had been fastened rigidly to the frames, Dodds fastened it at the front only, allowing for movement with expansion at the firebox end. Whether this locomotive was built by him, or whether the railway itself built any, is unclear, though Dodds left in 1842 to set up in business on his own. Certainly, at that time, demand may have been outstripping supply.

One engine, the 2-2-2 Agilis was supplied in 1839 by Fenton, Murray and Jackson, who provided another Rotherham, built under subcontract by Bingley and Company of Leeds. Another, the Sheffield, said to be the first to have been built in that city, was provided in 1840 by Davy Brothers. This was a six-wheeled locomotive to design of a Mr. William Vickers. The 5-foot-6-inch (1.7 m) driving wheels were connected by 4-inch (100 mm) belts which provided traction on all wheels. It was later, it is believed, converted to a conventional pattern.

By 1840 the line owned six locomotives, all six-wheeled, with one or more supplied by Robert Stephenson and Company.

Although services began with three classes of carriage, the second class was soon discarded. The first class consisted of the usual three compartments each holding six people and had Losh's patent wheels. The third class coaches apart from two were enclosed and held about 40 passengers, probably standing, and had the usual cast-iron wheels. Apart from one sheep truck, all the goods wagons belonged to Earl Fitzwilliam, the coal owner.

== Modern history ==
The Wicker station had closed to passengers on 1 February 1870 when the new Sheffield station opened, together with the new main line approaching from the south. Wicker continued as a goods station until 12 July 1965.

Westgate station at Rotherham closed to all traffic on 6 October 1952.

The short connection from Wicker to Bridgehouses closed in 1948.

The remainder of the original S&RR line continues in use as a key part of the main line between Sheffield and the north.

== Early passenger stations and locations ==
- Sheffield; opened 1 November 1838; renamed Sheffield Wicker April 1852/October 1853; closed 1 February 1870;
- Grimesthorpe Bridge; opened by 24 November 1838; closed 25 March 1839; reopened by 27 November 1839; closed after January 1843;
- Brightside; opened by 24 November 1838; new station opened 29 May 1898; closed 30 January 1995;
- Blackburn Forge; opened by 24 November 1838; name uncertain, and closed on 25 March 1839 as Blackburn Bridge;
- The Holmes; opened by 24 November 1838; renamed Holmes 1 January 1858; closed 19 September 1955;
- Rotherham; opened 1 November 1838; renamed Rotherham Westgate 1 May 1896; closed 6 October 1952.
